= Willandra, Ryde =

Heritage listed homestead in New South Wales, Australia

Willandra
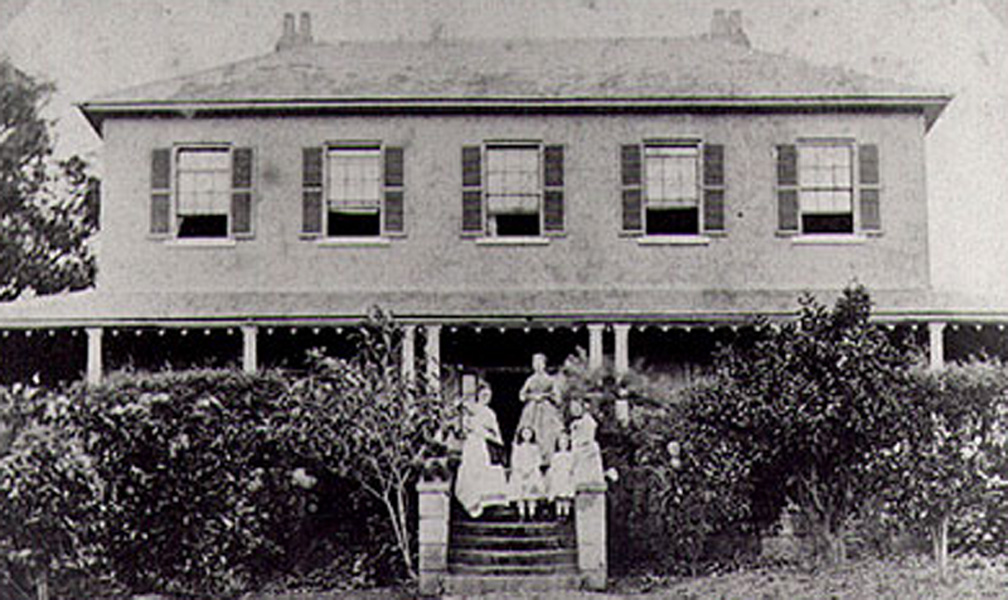
- Willandra, Ryde at the time it was occupied by the Devlin family c. 1870.

- Location within Sydney
- 33°48′58″S 151°06′08″E
- Location: 782 Victoria Road, Ryde, New South Wales, Australia

History
- Built: 1841–1844

Site notes
- Architect: William Weaver (attrib.)
- Architectural style: Colonial Georgian
- Owner: City of Ryde

New South Wales Heritage Register
- Official name: Willandra; Ryde House
- Type: State heritage (complex / group)
- Designated: 2 April 1999
- Reference no.: 26
- Type: Homestead building
- Category: Residential buildings (private)
- Builders: James Devlin

Willandra is a heritage-listed former service station and homestead and now community facility located at 782 Victoria Road, Ryde, New South Wales, Australia. Its design is attributed to William Weaver and built from 1841 to 1844 by James Devlin. It is also known as the Ryde House. The property is owned by the City of Ryde council. It was added to the New South Wales State Heritage Register on 2 April 1999.

The house is completed in the Colonial Georgian architectural style. During the 1970s the house was in danger of being demolished but it was purchased by the City of Ryde Council with the assistance of the Australian Government and has been restored. It is now used by local community groups.

== History ==
The Ryde area was highly suitable for farming and orchards, and early grants to marines were given to encourage agriculture. In 1792 land in the area was granted to eight marines; two were in the modern area of Ryde. Isaac Archer and John Colethread each received 32 hectares (80 acres) of land on the site of the present Ryde-Parramatta Golf Links, now in West Ryde. Later in 1792, in the Eastern Farms area, twelve grants, most about 12 hectares (30 acres), were made to convicts. Much later these were bought by John Macarthur, Gregory Blaxland and the Reverend Samuel Marsden. The district remained an important orcharding area throughout the 19th century.

The grants in the Ryde area were originally called Eastern Farms, later Kissing Point, because of a rock shelf in the Parramatta River bed. At low tide the keels of boats graxed the rock shelf, which in nautical terms is called "kissing". The whole settlement became known as Kissing Point - right up the hill and over the area where Devlin was to build Ryde House (later Willandra).

=== Devlin family ===
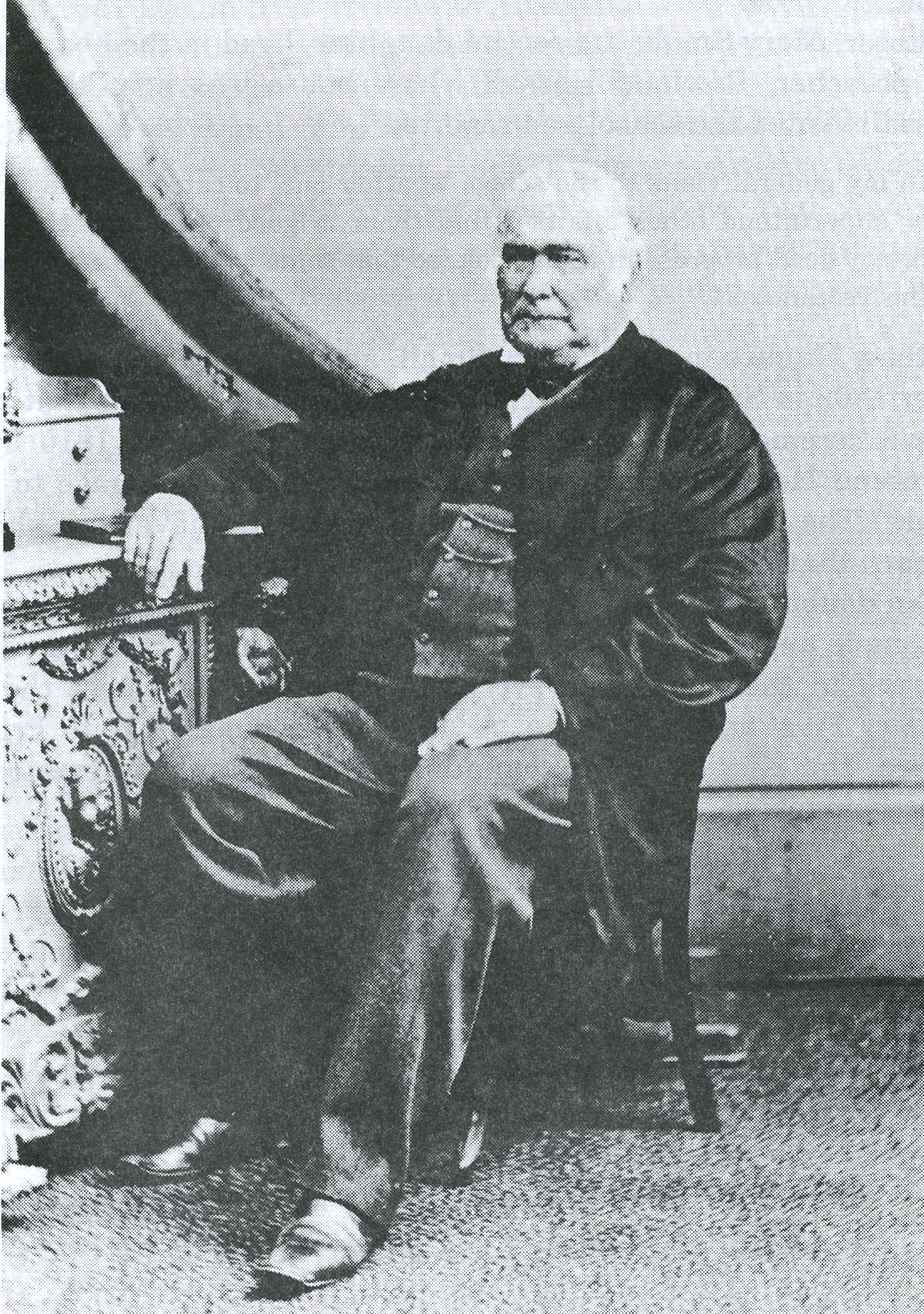
James Devlin circa 1870

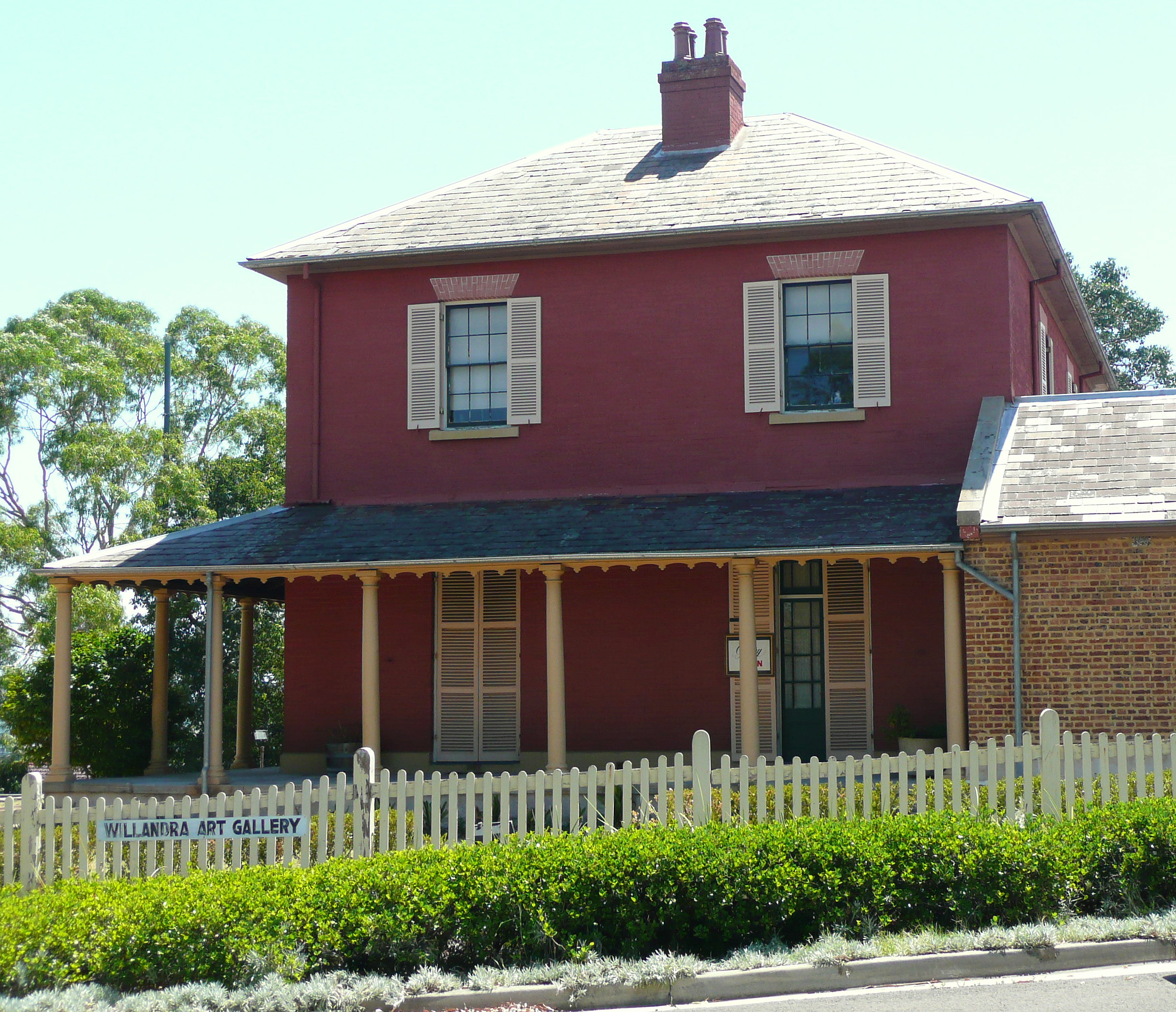
Willandra in March 2013

The land on which the house was built was part of John Small's original 1794 grant and was acquired (Cashman, (1982) says 'inherited') by James Devlin in 1828. Devlin was born in NSW in 1808, the son of Irish exile Arthur Devlin. Arthur had survived the Great Rebellion of 1798 in Ireland, and the Robert Emmet revolt of 1803. A great number of his comrades of 1798 were shipped to New South Wales as convicts, but Arthur managed to bargain for his terms of surrender and came to Sydney as an exile, and not as a convict, with a few of his relatives. Soon after arrival (1831) Arthur married colonial-born Priscilla Squire. She was the daughter of James Squire, patriarch of Kissing Point, land owner, brewer and man of business.

Not long after Arthur Devlin died, his mother remarried, this time to Thomas, son of a first Fleeter, John Small. Thomas and Priscilla became the owners of a 30-acre (12 hectare) grant to John Small. And James Devlin was to become heir to some of James Squire's considerable fortune, when Squire died in James's 14th year. When James reached maturity he in turn was granted the land by succession.

Already in 1837, James had joined the land rush, and he must have felt confident in the early 1840s when he began to build. In the 1850s the previous decade's optimism was replaced with one of the worst depressions to befall New South Wales. It perhaps indicates Devlin's financial position that he could conceive such a grand building plan when conditions seemed so inopportune. In any case he mortgaged the property almost immediately it was completed. But unlike many others, he was able to survive the bad times and retain his property. At that time few buildings were nearby. St. Anne's church was then a small, insignificant building, doing duty as church and school until 1838. In that year a school was built down the road, opposite the police station. The rector of St.Anne's was the Rev. G.E.W.Turner, recently arrived with his wife from the Isle of Wight. Mrs Turner fancied there was a resemblance in the area to her old homeland, and the expatriates began using the name "Ryde", although it was variously called Hunters Hill, Kissing Point and Field of Mars. Devlin called his new house "Ryde House" and in 1841 the Post Office was named Ryde.

Devlin was originally a wheelwright. Later he became pound-keeper and postmaster (Government contractor for the district, until 1839) of Kissing Point before becoming a successful developer and contractor.

At the time Ryde House was built, Governor Sir George Gipps was controlling NSW and there was growing resistance to the inflow of convicts into New South Wales. Devlin chose the Georgian style of architecture, even though Queen Victoria had been reigning since 1837.

About 1840 the name "Ryde" began to be used in the locality. The 1841 subdivision is the earliest documented use of this name. Martin has shown that the names Ryde and Turner Street were both used by James Devlin in his subdivision to honour the new Anglican Minister, Rev.George Turner, whose wife was a native of the English Ryde. Devlin and his neighbour, James Shepherd, had some 40 lots surveyed in a subdivision they named the Village of Ryde, with Devlin's "East Ryde" facing St.Anne's Church and Shepherd's "West Ryde" facing the road to Parramatta.

Devlin's new Ryde House crowned the ridge between the two precincts. Wilson interprets this name change as indicating a desire by 2nd and 3rd generation Devlins, Shepherds, Farnells and others to distance themselves from convict origins. The new name Ryde emanated from Ryde House, which could be seen from the Parramatta River and main roads and partly obscured the church, reinforcing the social control of the new local gentry.

Devlin began building Willandra in 1841 on the old Small's farm and occupied his new house in 1845. Devlin was declared bankrupt in 1844 but was released from insolvency in 1845. In 1852 he purchased 8 acres from the estate of Mrs Blanch, to the south of Small's (i.e.: Devlin's) farm. The family lived there until 1874.

Architect and engineer William Weaver lived and worked in NSW from 1851 to 1864. He was Colonial Architect from 1855 to 1856. He set up in private practice in 1856, at the age of 28, in Pitt Street, Sydney. Weaver, his wife and first son, William Broughton Weaver, lived at Ryde during 1856-58 and since an 1860 advertisement mentioned that he "erected many villas on the Parramatta River" he must have been involved in designing, consulting and surveying there. Willandra at Ryde is similar to some of Weaver's residences and the Devlin family who owned it were closely involved with St. Anne's Church.

Devlin acquired property in the Riverina district becoming one of the first pastoralists in that region. He was instrumental in the establishment of the Municipality of Ryde in 1871 to which he was elected an alderman. It is he whom Devlin's Creek and Devlin Street are named after. Devlin was a magistrate at Ryde from 1864 to 1872. When he sold Ryde house in 1874 (1875, sold to Jane Darvall, widow of Major Darvall of nearby Ryedale, say Ryde City Council, 2016), the family moved to one of his properties near Wagga Wagga.

In 1874 Devlin released a second subdivision of land on the north-west of Small's (i.e.: Devlin's) farm, selling the southern portion sold to Jane Darvall. James Devlin died in 1875.

James Devlin was born in 1808 in Sydney. His father was Arthur Devlin, an Irishman who was a leader in the 1798 Rebellion and was captured and exiled to Australia in 1805. His mother was Priscilla Squire, the daughter of James Squire, who was a brewer near Ryde. James's father died when he was only 12 and his mother remarried. His stepfather was Thomas Small. At the age of 14, James became an apprentice wheelwright and remained in this trade for much of his life. In 1831 he married Mary Ann Hartigan and the following year they had a son James (see photo below). In 1833 Mary died in childbirth and the baby, John, died the following day.

In 1834 James married Susannah Hughes (1810–1906), who was the daughter of Matthew Hughes and Mary Small. Matthew was a schoolmaster first in Sydney and later at Richmond in the Hawkesbury region. James and Susannah had ten children, some of whom are shown in the photos below. James became a relatively influential businessman in the Ryde area and was warden and trustee of St Anne's Church for many years. His daughter Rebecca Fitzhardinge (see photo below) remembers that part of James business involved the supply of food to several public institutions such as the Orphan School at Parramatta. He also had an orange orchard near Willandra, which was a commercial venture that provided the family with another source of income. The orange orchid is mentioned in some of the advertisements for the sale or lease of Willandra in later years (see below).

In 1841 the Devlins started to build Willandra and by 1845 the family had moved in. Rebecca Fitzhardinge born in 1846 states that she was the first child born in the house. Shortly before they occupied the property James became bankrupt but was released from insolvency in the following year.

The Devlin family lived at Willandra for almost 30 years. The picture above of the house shows some of the family in about 1870 shortly before they left Ryde. In 1874 the Devlins sold the house and moved to Wagga Wagga, New South Wales. According to Rebecca Fitzhardinge, it was first sold to Mrs Jane Darvall and she in turn sold it to Mr John Donald Macansh. He then sold the property to the trustees of Mrs Caroline Manning. An advertisement for the sale of the house appeared in the Sydney Morning Herald in 1875. At this stage it was referred to as Ryde House and was described in the following terms:

"Ryde House, Kissing Point, for private sale. That commodious family mansion containing hall, 12 rooms, kitchen, laundry and every possible convenience; magnificent garden, orchard, orangery, gardener's house etc. Abundant supply of the very purest water and in one of the healthiest positions in the colony commanding the most extensive and beautiful view, interrupted only by the grand background of the different mountains."

James Devlin died shortly after he moved to Wagga in 1875. His wife Susannah lived for another 32 years and died at the age of 98 years in 1907. When she died, an obituary was written in the Sydney Morning Herald outlining details of her life and stating that she had at that time 42 living grandchildren

The Devlin family name has been preserved in the name of Devlins Creek, a tributary of the Lane Cove River, and Devlin Street.

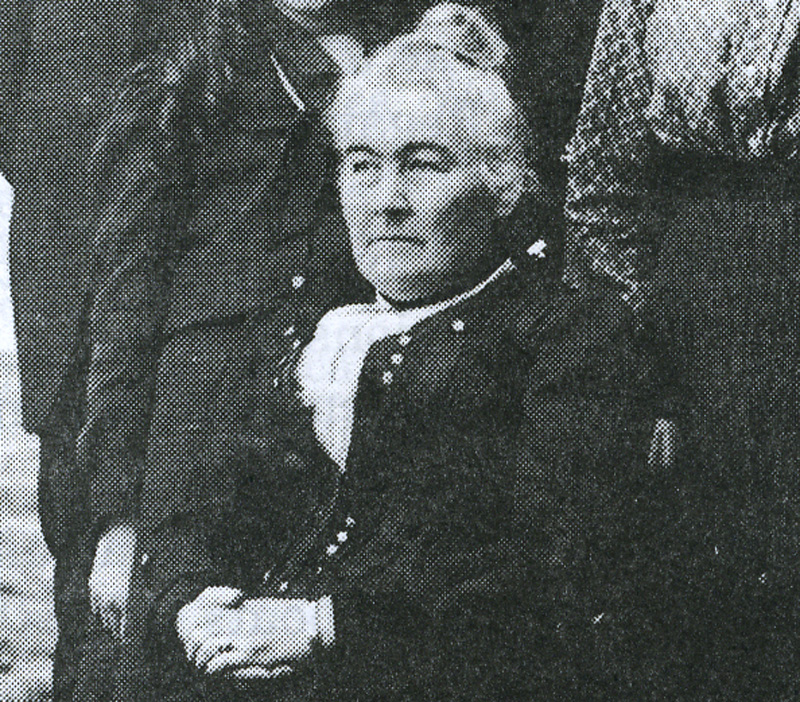
Rebecca Fitzhardinge (née Devlin) daughter of James and Susannah Devlin

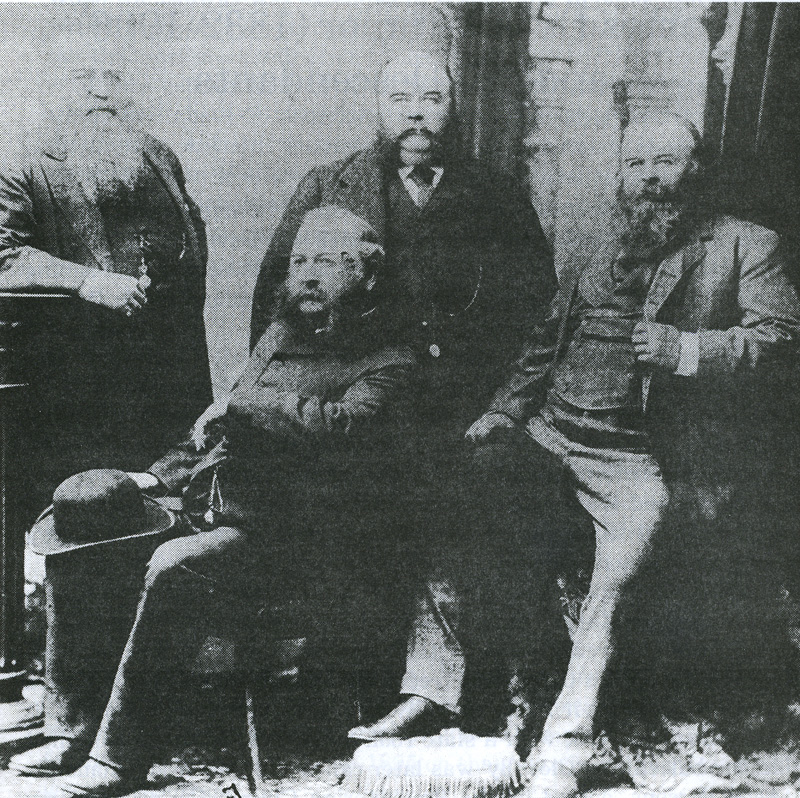
Four of the sons of James Devlin. Left to Right. James Devlin (Junior) (1832-1906); William Devlin (1842-1903); Arthur Albert Devlin (1844-1907); Matthew Henry Devlin (1839-1910)

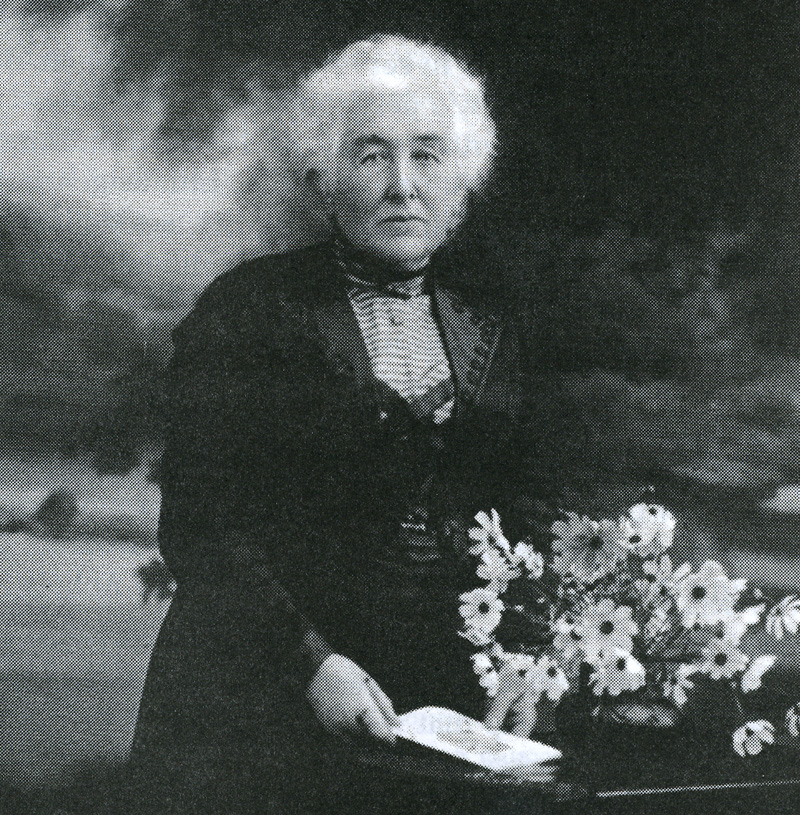
Eliza Susannah Holloway (née Devlin) (1841-1925) daughter of James and Susannah Devlin

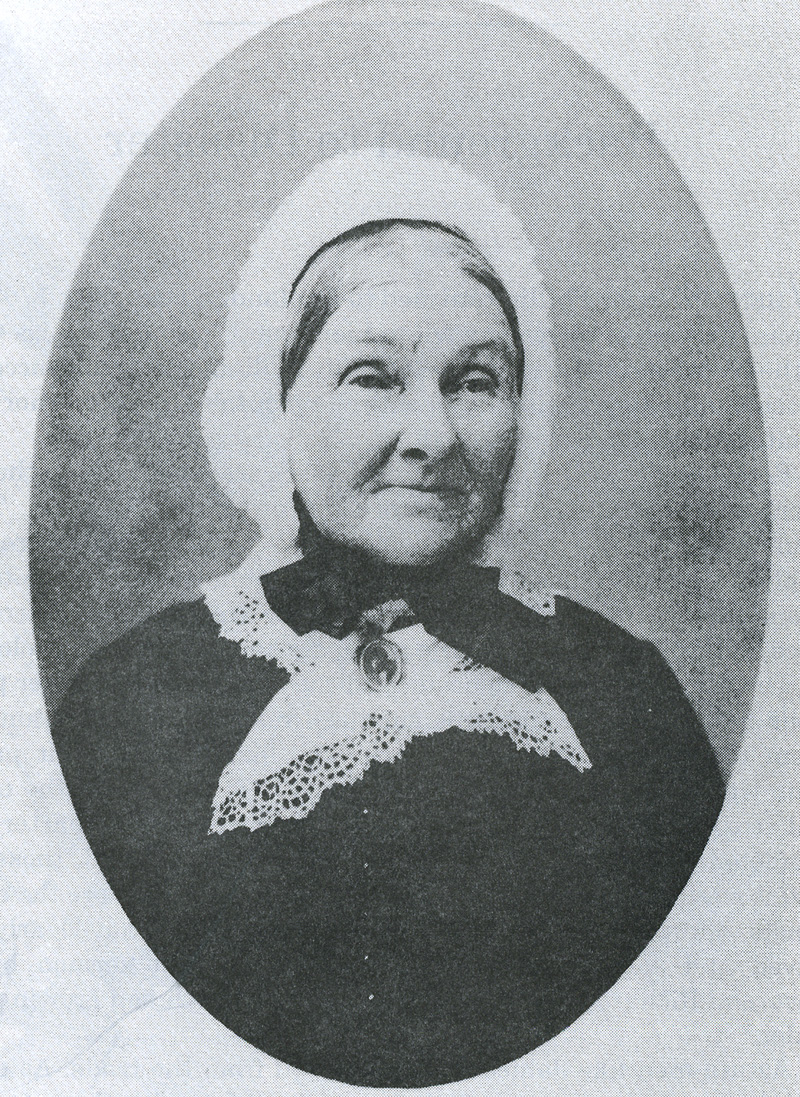
Susannah Devlin, wife of James Devlin, circa 1870

=== Caroline and John Edye Manning ===
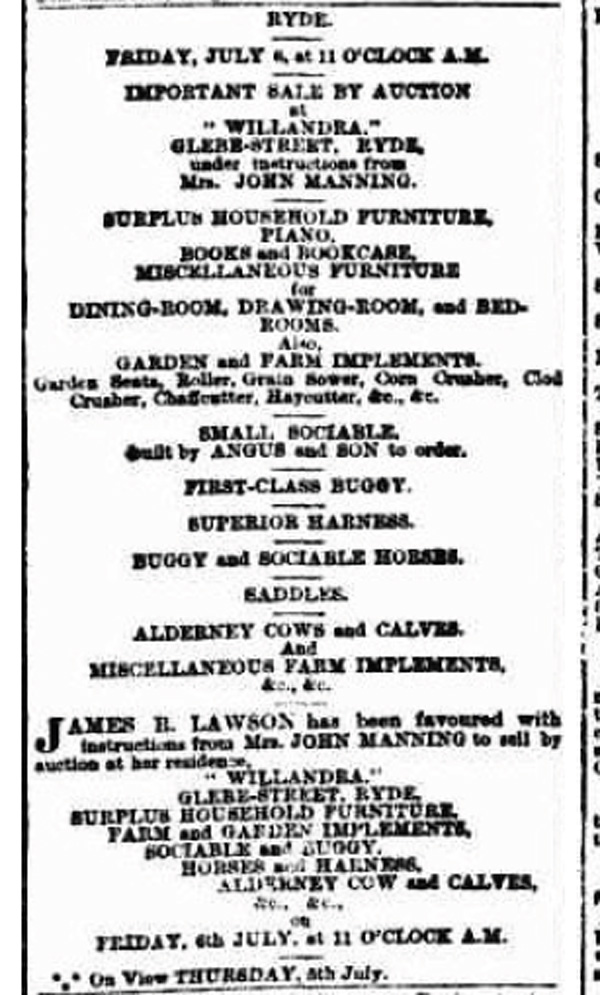
Advertisement placed in the Sydney Morning Herald by Caroline Manning for the sale of the contents of Willandra in 1894

Caroline Manning owned Willandra from 1879 until her death in 1921 but she resided at the house only until 1894. Caroline was born Caroline Elizabeth Mary Suttor in 1841 in New South Wales and was the daughter of William Henry Suttor and Charlotte Augusta Ann Francis. Suttor was a wealthy pastoralist and politician who owned the property Brucedale in Bathurst, New South Wales, where Caroline spent her childhood. Caroline's father died in 1877 and in accordance with his will Willandra was bought for her and held for her in trust.

John Edye Manning was born in 1831 and was the son of John Edye Manning (1807–1889) and Fanny Elizabeth Manning and the grandson of John Edye Manning (1783–1870) who was the Registrar of the New South Wales Supreme Court. He was, like his father, a merchant.

Caroline and John were married in 1859 and had thirteen children, six boys and seven girls. Their fourth child, Reginald Kerr Manning, travelled up river to school at Newington College when it was at Newington House on the Parramatta River at Silverwater.

In 1894 John Edye Manning was involved in a sensational divorce case where he was named as the co-respondent. He was found guilty and was ordered by the Court to pay 2000 pounds. The case was reported widely in the newspapers in March 1894 and two months later Caroline advertised Willandra as a house to be let. The advertisement read as follows.

“To let, Willandra, the Residence of Mrs Manning, furnished or unfurnished a most comfortable family residence, overlooking the Parramatta River within a mile of the railway and steamer. Contains 18 lofty and spacious rooms, outoffices, stables etc. Water and gas laid on. Tennis lawns, fruit and flower gardens.

This advertisement with the mention of “Willandra” indicates that it was the Mannings who chose the name Willandra for the house, since the For Sale notice by James Devlin in 1874 (see above) referred to the residence as “Ryde House”. Shortly after she advertised the house to be let, she placed an ad for the sale of the contents of Willandra. The advertisement is shown in the picture on the right.

Some time after Willandra had been let, the family left Australia for England. The United Kingdom Census of 1901 shows that John and Caroline and their five youngest children were living at 28 London Road, Reigate, a market town in Surrey. John Edye Manning died at Reigate in 1909 and Caroline died twelve years later in 1921 in Kensington aged 79 years.

Jane Darvall sold Ryde House in 1878 to merchant John Edye Manning (mainly known for his ownership of Parramatta River Ferries). John's wife Caroline and family lived here from around 1874 to 1896. RCC add that by 1879 it had passed to William Henry Suttor (Jr.) and Benjamin Buchanan in trust for Caroline Elizabeth Mary Manning (née Suttor) through the will of her late father, William Henry Suttor (Sr.) and the name of the house changed from Mansion House to Willandra, reflecting a squatting run held by the family in the Riverina.

The Mannings changed its name to Willandra House. It is unknown when that name change occurred. This may have been some time after Australia's Federation in 1900. The name is attributed to the Aboriginal word for "rushing water", there being several creeks on the property. Willandra was fondly remembered by members of the local community for social occasions held there. The earliest recorded use of the name "Willandra" in the Sands Directory was in 1911, when John T.Craig rented the house from the Manning trustees. Cashman (1982, 36) records the name change as occurring in the early to mid-1890s, when the house was owned by the Suttor Brothers, on behalf of their sister, Mrs J. E. Manning.

The property was subdivided in 1893 and the house used as rental apartments.

=== Ellen Pye ===
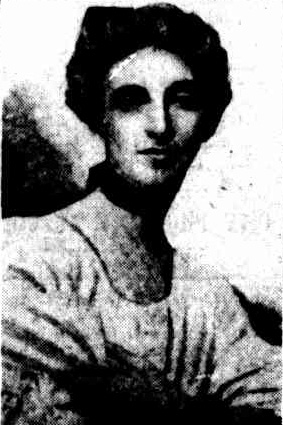
Miss Ellen Pye, Principal of the school at Willandra from 1894 to 1899

Ellen Pye rented Willandra from Caroline Manning from 1894 to 1899. The house became a Boarding and Day School for Girls called Rydalmount. The advertisement for the school (shown in picture below) appeared in the Sydney Morning Herald in June 1894 and gave a colourful description of Willandra as follows:

“The house is situated on a magnificent site of 30 acres, 200 feet above the sea level and commands extensive and picturespue views, embracing a wide and beautiful sweep of the Parramatta River. There are spacious playgrounds, ornamental gardens, and a lawn tennis court, a large orchard and vineyard. The rooms are lofty and well ventilated, thoroughly adapted for school purposes.

Ellen Blundell Pye was born in 1860 in Lathom, a small village in Lancashire, England. Her parents were Edward and Ellen Pye. and they owned a farm in the village. She was part of a large family of six children, two boys and four girls. When Ellen was still a child her father died and the family moved to North Meols where her mother ran a boarding house. In 1883 at the age of 22 Ellen immigrated to Australia with her mother and some of her siblings on the ship Orient.

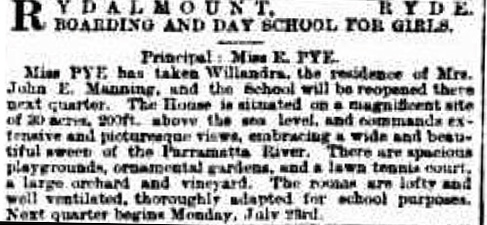
Advertisement placed by Miss Ellen Pye for the school at Willandra in June 1894.

By 1890 Ellen had become Principal of St Anne's School in Ryde. and in 1894 she decided to run her own school at Willandra. The Sydney Morning Herald in October of that year gives a brief description of a fete organised by the pupils at Miss Pye's school Willandra, Ryde in aid of the Children's Hospital. The newspaper says that there were “stalls for fancy work and toys, refreshments, flowers and bouquets.” The article also lists the young ladies who were pupils at the school.

Ellen ran the school at Willandra until 1899 at which time she moved to Victoria to become Principal of Toorak College. She remained there until 1907 but due to ill health she retired. Some time later she returned to England and lived in Wimbledon for many years. She died there in 1948 at the age of 88 years.

The estate subdivisions in 1921 and 1925 used the name "Willandra Estate" and it is perhaps this usage that gave the name popular currency in the locality, especially with the naming of Willandra Street in 1925.

=== Other residents ===
After Miss Pye left Willandra there were several other lessees some of whom included Mr John Melliday, Augustus Cook and Mr John T Craig. Caroline Pye died in 1921 and the house was sold. Some of the owners were George Henry Nash from 1926 until 1932; Rowland Wesley Small from 1932 until 1945; and Kenneth Roy Bernard-Smith from 1945 until 1951. From 1951 until 1976 Willandra was used by various owners as a service station or motor vehicle repair workshop. In May 1976 Willandra was purchased by the Ryde City Council who restored the house and leased it to the Ryde District Historical Society and the City of Ryde Art Society. These two community groups still occupy Willandra today.

=== Twentieth century developments ===
In 1935 the Ryde Bridge opened for road traffic joining the bottom of Church Street with Uhr's Point in Concord. As part of associated road works, Devlin Street was extended southward to join Church Street. The new line of road followed the alignment of the lane or yard of the Small's farm buildings. Earlier in 1932, new owner Roland Small had installed a petrol bowser for his personal use at the house. Small travelled to St Leonards and back each day for work, and presumably petrol was difficult to obtain en route. The location of the bowser at the junction of these two important roads seems to have attracted car users, and when Small decided to move he leased the property to Mr Tharratt, who built a garage and motor trimming shop across the Victoria Road facade of the house.

In the 1950s Victoria Road was widened, resulting in a loss of a belt of trees associated with neighbouring "Borambil" and may have also affected some garden plantings at Willandra.

In 1952 the house and land were bought by Shell Australia who converted the garage on site to a service station. This operated until 1970 when the property was bought by Mr Hooper, who closed the service station and opened a second hand car yard The rest of the house was rented for residential use with a succession of tenants. Willandra was never without occupants until restoration, but during its 140 years as a freehold property, it suffered at the hands of various owners, and, in its later stages, from neglect and the ravages of the weather.

In 1973 the house came under threat (of demolition for its materials, which were to be bought and re-erected in the Paterson Valley. Approaches were made by the Ryde & District Historical Society to Ryde City Council and the State Government and other interested bodies. Agitation by concerned organisations, especially the Ryde District Historical Society, secured a Government of Australia grant of $100,000 in 1973/4; $48,000 in 1979) in 1979. This enabled Ryde Council to purchase the property in that year.

The Australian Government funding was a grant under the National Estate program arising from the first Commonwealth legislation enacted to protect Australia's heritage. It was one of a group of six properties which were the first in New South Wales to receive such funding.

=== Willandra's restoration (1979-80) ===
Tom Uren, Federal Minister for Regional and Urban Development, did much to make this grant available. The NSW Government insisted on the funds being filtered through the State Department of Planning and Environment. This had some advantages, particularly with legal and procedural advice. The funds were finally passed to Ryde Council for "purchase and restoration". The terms were that the restoration was to be overseen by representatives of Ryde Council, the National Trust of Australia (NSW) and Ryde Historical Society. There was protracted negotiation with the owner over price and an offer was made, roughly halfway between the Valuer-General's estimate and that of a private valuer. It was finally bought by Ryde Council for $85,600. There was very little money left for restoration and that was spent mainly on essential repairs and maintenance to protect it from the weather and vandals. Ryde Council made a further $45,000 available and later the then Minister for Planning and Environment, Mr Landa, made a $48,000 subsidy contingent (under its in fact heritage legislation, the NSW Heritage Act 1977) on a dollar-for-dollar contribution by Ryde Council.

On 5 January 1979 an interim heritage order was placed over the property. And on 14 December 1979 a permanent conservation order was gazetted.

The architect for the restoration was (heritage architect) Mr Clive Lucas and the builder was Gledhill Constructions. Extensive conservation works were undertaken under Lucas' direction in 1979–80. By this stage Willandra had degenerated badly. Elementary maintenance had been neglected, although tenants occupied some of the main house while work was waiting to begin. A taxi radio station mast had been installed in the roof gulley and predictably, water came through causing extensive damage to ceilings. The top windows had deteriorated badly as upstairs shutters had been removed by a previous owner and rain from the south and north east had caused rot in the broad cedar sills and architraves. There were very few roof slates missing or misplaced, but there was some damage to ceilings under the openings. The roof was sealed, but the guttering, although not old, was mutilated chiefly due to poor installation. This had to be replaced and fixed to the barge boards.

One of the hardest jobs was ensuring the downpipes, when replaced, did not carry water under the house, which had happened over a period of years causing rising damp to head height on inside walls. This was so well done that only three millimetres in height was lots. A Canadian-type drain was run under the floor to carry away water. Where floors were rotted, bearers from larger rooms were cut down to size for smaller rooms: floor boards could be used in the same way and this ensured minimal replacement timber. Boards were not sawn to identical thickness in the 1840s and they were notched on the underside of the joinsts. Sanding smoothed over what little unevenness there was and some boards were replaced where rot was extensive. The downstairs floors are blackbutt - still preserved in the main - and upstairs floors of American pine.

Top floor windows and surrounds were restored in cedar, but a little lighter in shade than originals. Windows, architraves and sills were removed where necessary to make inlays and mullions as exact replicas of originals. The wallpaper was not original and not worth preserving so the walls were stripped and made good before being painted. Ceilings are plaster and lath but where they were too far gone to be easily repaired, sheets of plaster or gyprock were put below it. The better rooms have heavy cornices while lesser ones are squared at the wall ceiling junction. The better rooms have marble chimney pieces and lesser ones Marulan sandstone. The top north-eastern bedroom has its chimney piece pilasters grained to resemble wood, while its mantle piece is painted black. The grate in this room is elaborate iron. This and all the chimney pieces were stolen, together with the cedar doors, but these were recovered thanks to an alert neighbour. In stripping the hall walls, a stencilled frieze was uncovered. From a section of this another stencil was cut and the design has been repainted around the back section of the hall and halfway up the stairway. The front door is semi-elliptical in shape with blunt triangles of glass within cedar mullions. There is a frieze along either side of the hall wall. The ceiling in this part of the hall is clearly the original plaster and lath, restored on its.

Further Government grants allowed restoration to be undertaken (supervised by Clive Lucas & Partners) which was completed in 1980. Part of the works was to construct a landscape on the small parcel of land suggesting some elements of Victorian landscapes. Key elements in the hard works were the fences and gravel pathways and driveways. A 2m high timber paling fence with curved tops was erected along Victoria Road and partly around Willandra Street to suggest that this is the rear of the house. Small sections of a low painted picket fence with a scalloped profile between posts and incorporating gates were also included. There is a pair of gates addressing Willandra Street (to the east) and a set addressing Victoria Road (to the north) to suggest entrance driveways. The gravel pathways are defined by brick curb and gutters.

Designed as a perfectly symmetrical house, the restoration has bought it back to its original concept except that there is no chimney through the roof on the old ballroom. The shutters of the ballroom and kitchen open onto a courtyard reached from the main back door. These shutters are not cedar as the original shutters disintegrated years ago and were replaced with lesser wood, which has also disintegrated and been restored with pine.

The entire exterior, except for the sandstock brick filling in the ballroom and kitchen exterior walls, has been painted in deep terracotta. Although this colour seems to have been the predominating colour found by the restorers, it was a shock to those who had never known Willandra as other than a cream colour.

Landscaping was made possible through the efforts of the Ryde Rotary Club. A large thick concrete tarmac had to be listed out before replanting began. Ivy and plumbago were set along the fence and near the verandah, and lawn was laid. Two peppercorn trees are now growing well. An oleander at the rear and three yuccas near the gate add the old-time touch.

Willandra was then reoccupied, with the Ryde District Historical Society and the City of Ryde Art Society as joint tenants. for use as a local museum, art gallery and classes (Heritage Branch file), folio 243). Willandra is open to the public at weekends. Clive Lucas & Partners won a merit award from the NSW Chapter of the Royal Australian Institute of Architects for their work on Willandra.

In 1990 the Roads & Traffic Authority (RTA) prepared an environmental impact statement for a road underpass to carry Devlin Street under Victoria Road, adjacent to Willandra. The demolition of some 16 houses and buildings, including one heritage item (Borambil) and relocation of another (Westward Cottage) and major earthworks had several effects. Devlin Street has moved slightly westward of its 1935 alignment and away from Willandra. Much of the surviving Ryde village context in the south-western part of Devlin's 1841 subdivision has been destroyed. There is now a permanent and obvious spatial separation of the house from the proposed historical precinct that covers the remnants of the old village.

In the 1880s new transport routes separated the manor from the common. In the 1990s this has been repeated with the mansion now separated from its village. The southern vistas are now the principal contextual link remaining between the present Willandra and the mid-19th century Ryde House.

Works associated with the Devlin Street Victoria Road underpass were undertaken from 1996 to 1998.

Willandra was transferred to the State Heritage Register on 2 April 1999.

Willandra did retain this special association between the Ryde District Historical Society and the Ryde District Act Society, however, it is believed that as of circa March 2022 that Willandra is solely managed by the Ryde District Historical Society.

== Description ==
Site

The original curtilage (30 acres including Small's three orchards on his farm) of the house has been severely reduced through subdivisions over time and the context has been dramatically altered. The house originally stood in a rural landscape and now is in a suburban setting adjacent to two major roads. The alignments of both Victoria Road, Willandra Street and Church Street have been recently altered to define the land parcel today.

Willandra homestead formed part of an arrangement on the ridge at Ryde. The setting was laid out in accordance with English Arcadian landscape principles. The main section of the homestead building focused directly on Parramatta River with overlooking the rural land in between. Ryde Village grew adjacent to Willandra by means of subdivision and land donations to the church.

The setting has been modified by 20th century transport infrastructure and design values. Today Willandra is set on a much smaller site at the corner of a busy intersection (Devlin Street and Victoria Road), which has visually cut the connection between Willandra and the buildings that made Ryde Village. Surrounding developments have greatly decreased the grandeur of Willandra because of their scale and proximity. However, Willandra maintains some of its original notoriety by being quite elevated, exposed to a corner and maintaining axial views to Parramatta River.

Garden

There are a number of large shrubs and trees in the south-east corner. The old hoop pine now just outside the current boundary adjacent, is in a very poor condition. It is believed that this may be the same tree seen in a c.1863 photograph and is at least the tree known to have been a mature tree in 1935.

The garden is now much reduced on the original and chiefly consists of a driveway from the south-east across the front of the house past a stone retaining wall and steps (original, with wide steps running parallel to the house's southern (main) verandah), areas of lawn and some fringing tree plantings framing views, being Chinese elm (Ulmus parvifolia) and Norfolk Island hibiscus/white oak/ cow itch tree (Lagunaria patersonae) to the south-east, a large Moreton Bay fig (Ficus macrophylla) to the south-west.

A Port Jackson fig (F.rubiginosa) is on the western boundary fence.

Little of the Lucas Fisher-designed garden remains, despite that the plan (1978) was never fully undertaken in the 1980s. The lemon trees on the level below the garden stairs have died as well as the existing silky oak (Grevillea robusta). The box hedge (Buxus sp.) around the edge of the front verandah has been removed due to water damage to the structure but Kaffir lilies (Clivea miniata) have now been planted (as intended) in its place. The Port Jackson fig (Ficus rubiginosa) on the east side of the verandah remains and a sweet box (Murraya paniculata) hedge has been planted against the picket fence along the eastern boundary (this was intended to be Cape plumbago (P.capensis)). The rear garden has two plaques, one a commemoration of the 1988 bicentennary and the other in honour of Bill Stacey, the first president of the Ryde District Historical Society which has been placed at the foot of a young gum tree. The Lucas Fisher landscape concept specified this tree to be a peppercorn (Schinus molle var.areira) tree. Another peppercorn tree is nearby to the east.

To the house's west is mainly a connecting access drive which curves back to Victoria Road at the north-west, to a back set of entry/exit gates. A paling fence faces Victoria Road. Picket fences flank the front gates to Willandra Street. Two sets of gates face both Willandra Street and Victoria Road. The rear of the house (north) facing Victoria Road has grassed area between the two house wings, and perimeter shrub plantings (recent, in 2009) comprising white Cape plumbago (P.auriculata), apple blossom (Abelia grandiflora) and Chinese lantern (Abutilon x hybridum cv.s).

Compacted gravel/granite comprises the driveway and pedestrian path which flanks the house's eastern side, parallel to Willandra Street.

House

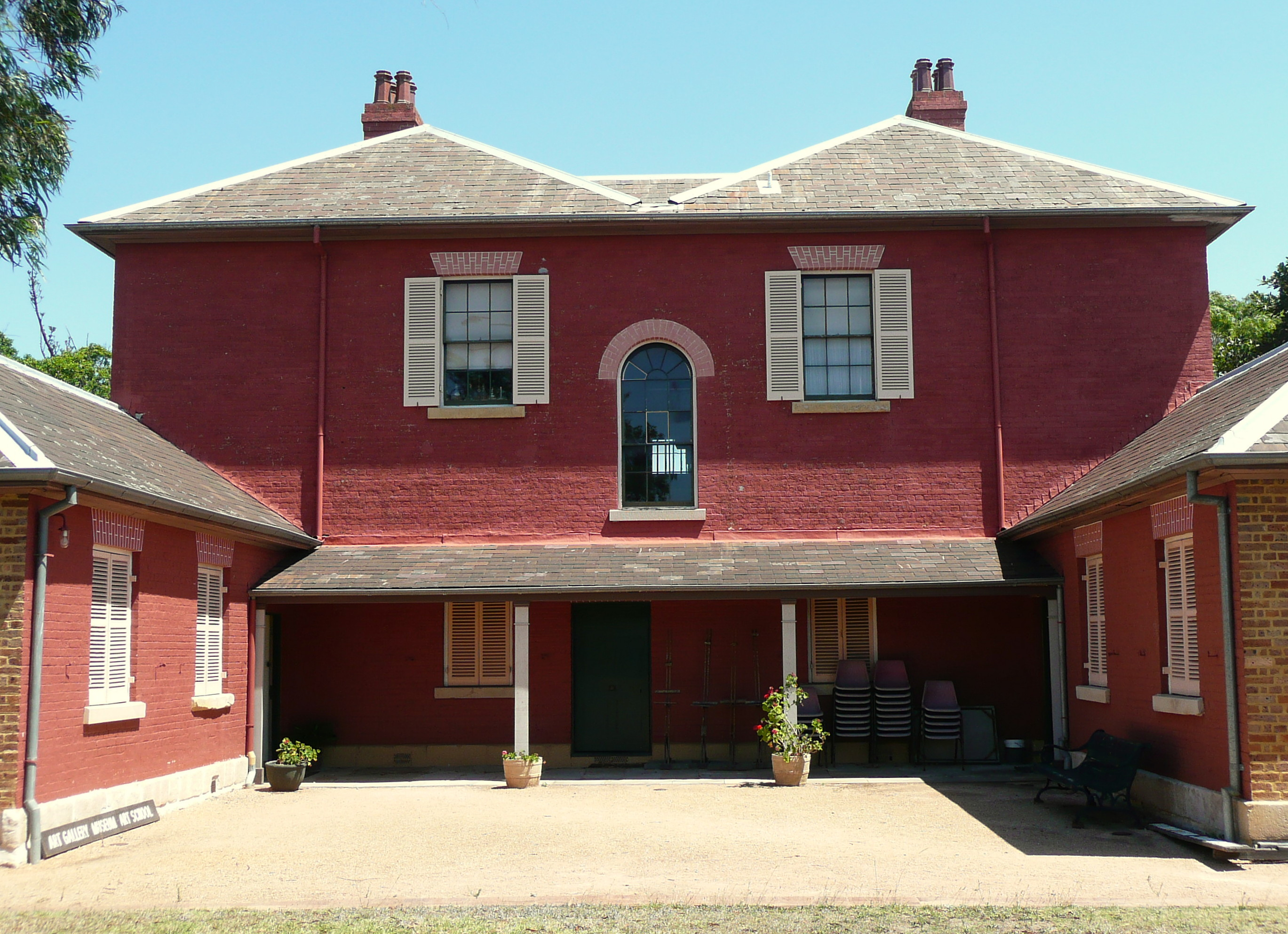
Willandra, rear view

Willandra is a colonial Georgian Revival style house, two storied, hipped roof, deep eaved, five bayed, with shuttered French doors below and 12 light double sash windows above, decorative fanlight over the front door and encircled by single storeyed, stone paved, stone columned verandahs. Exterior walls are rendered sandstock brickwork. Ceilings are generally plastered with decorative cornices. Floors are a mixture of blackbutt, kauri pine/Oregon and sandstone flagging. Timber doors and windows in Australian cedar.

=== Sandstock brick building. ===
The kitchen retains it s original wood-fuelled stove. Wood panelling closes off the dairy room from the kitchen.

=== Condition ===
As at 8 January 2015, the physical condition was good. There are a number of large shrubs and trees in the south-east corner. The old hoop pine (Araucaria cunninghamii) now just outside the current boundary adjacent, is in a very poor condition. It is believed that this may be the same tree seen in a c. 1863 photograph and is at least the tree known to have been a mature tree in 1935.

A full archaeological study of the site has not been undertaken. Although an archaeologist inspected the site in 8/1999 in relation to proposed excavation for drainage works, he did not report any potential archaeological deposits in the subject area.

Documentary evidence would suggest that there is archaeological potential in relation to outbuildings. Oral evidence suggests that there may be a well or cistern on the north-west side of the house but, as with the outbuildings on this side, evidence of it may have been destroyed or covered over during road widening. Similarly documentary evidence suggests that there was potential of archaeological evidence to the east of the house in the location of the former stables, stores and workshops associated with Willandra. That area was disturbed by recent road works in Church/Devlin Street. Assessment was undertaken by the RTA and the finding of archaeological deposits have not been reported, if they were ever found.

The area around the rear of the house has been disturbed due to the building of additions associated with the service station, including a WC in the approximate location of the courtyard. These have since been removed which would have caused further disturbance.

An assessment of the archaeological potential of the site would assist with identifying whether disturbance of subsurface material is likely in relation to excavations for services etc.

As at January 2015, generally in good condition, well maintained. Some fabric has deteriorated and is in need of repair. Most of the deteriorating fabric is associated with reconstruction works done in 1979–80. As well, internal wall and ceiling surfaces need repainting and some internal timber joinery requires refurbishing.

=== Modifications and dates ===
- 1841 estate subdivision (of Devlin's c. 9.7 hectares (24 acres))
- 1841-5 construction of Ryde House (now Willandra)
- 1921 and 1925 subdivisions
- 1932 Small had installed a petrol bowser for his personal use at the house.
- 1935 Devlin Street was extended southward to join Church Street and Ryde Bridge. The new line of road followed the alignment of the lane or yard of the Small's farm buildings.
- Small leased the property to Mr Tharratt, who built a garage and motor trimming shop across the Victoria Road facade of the house.
- A top floor verandah was superimposed on the original awning verandah between the rear two annexes, and four rounded brick arches supporting bearer joists, for the ground floor verandah, and four similar arches above to support the upper roof. A truck backed into one of the brick arch supports and rendered the arches unsafe. This hastened the restoration of the original concept of the awning verandah (between 1975 and 1980).
- 1950s Victoria Road widened which may have affected some garden plantings at Willandra.
- 1952 house and land bought by Shell Australia and converted the garage on site to a service station, which operated until 1970. This used the single storey annexes at the rear of the house (only). A false brick wall was built at the northern end and the north-eastern wall was filled with plate glass, This false wall was removed (1975–80).
- 1970 Hooper closed the service station and opened a second hand car yard, renting out the rest of the house to a succession of tenants.
- 1974 the house was bought by Ryde Council and progressively restored - work was completed in 1980.
- 1974: essential repairs and maintenance to protect from vandals and weather. Elementary maintenance had been neglected, although tenants occupied part of the main house while work was waiting to begin. A taxi radio station mast had been installed in the roof gulley, and water came through and caused extensive damage to ceilings. The top windows had deteriorated badly as the upstairs shutters had been removed by a previous owner and rain from the south and north east has caused rot in the broad cedar sills and architraves. There were very few roof slates missing or misplaced, but there was some damage to ceilings under the openings. It did not take long to seal the roof, but the guttering, although not old, was mutilated, chiefly because of poor installation. This had to be replaced and fixed to barge boards.

One of the hardest jobs was to ensure that downpipes, when replaced, did not carry water under the house. This had happened over a period of years and there was rising damp to head height on inside walls. Another big job was to suspend the inside walls and damp-proof-course them. This was so well done that only three millimetres in height was lost. A Canadian-type drain was run under the floor to carry away any water.

- 1975-80: restoration: Where the floors suffered from rot, the bearers from larger rooms were cut down to size for smaller rooms: floor boards could be used in the same way and this ensured minimal replacement timber.

Boards were not sawn to identical thickness in the 1840s and they were notched on the underside over the joists. Sanding smoothed over what little unevenness there was and some boards were replaced where rot was extensive. The downstairs floors were of blackbutt- still preserved in the main - and the upstairs floors of North American Pine. Restoration of top floor windows and surrounds was in cedar, but little lighter in shade than the original. Windows, architraves and sills were removed where necessary to make inlays and mullions as exact replicas of the originals. The wallpaper was not original and was not worth preserving so the walls were stripped and surfaces made good before painting. Ceilings are painted and lath but were a ceiling was too far gone to be easily repaired, sheets of plaster or gyprock were put below it. The better rooms have heavy cornices while the lesser ones are squared at the wall ceiling junction. The better rooms have marble chimney pieces and the lesser ones Marulan sandstone. The top north-eastern bedroom has the chimney piece pilasters grained to resemble wood, while the mantelpiece is painted black. The grate in this room is elaborate iron. This and all the chimney pieces were stolen, together with the cedar doors, but they were recovered, thanks to the alertness of a neighbour.

In stripping the hall walls, a stencilled frieze was uncovered. From a section of this, another stencil was cut and the design has been repainted around the back section of the hall and halfway up the sairway. The front door is semi-elliptical in shape with a blunt triangles of glass within its cedar mullions. There is a frieze along either side of the hall wall. The ceiling in this part of the hall is clearly the original plaster and lath, restored on its original laths. Just inside the main door- perhaps for inwelcomed guests- there is a trap door which originally had a handhole and ring-pull of brass. The wood of the lid is cedar but the rest of the floor is, of course blackbutt.

Designed as a perfectly symmetrical house, the restoration has bought it back to its original concept except that there is no chimney through the roof on the old ballroom. The shutters of the ballroom and kitchen open onto a courtyard reached from the main back door. These shutters are not cedar as the original shutters disintegrated years ago and were replaced with lesser wood, which has also disintegrated and been restored with pine.

The entire exterior, except for the sandstock brick filling in the ballroom and kitchen exterior walls, has been painted in deep terracotta. Although this colour seems to have been the predominating colour found by the restorers, it was a shock to those who had never known Willandra as other than a cream colour.

Landscaping was made possible through the efforts of the Ryde Rotary Club. A large thick concrete tarmac had to be listed out before replanting began. Ivy and plumbago were set along the fence and near the verandah, and lawn was laid. Two peppercorn trees are now growing well. An oleander at the rear and three yuccas near the gate add the old-time touch. 1983 subdivided and the house used as rental apartments.

1990 RTA environmental impact statement for a road underpass to carry Devlin Street under Victoria Road, adjacent to Willandra. Demolition of some 16 houses and buildings, including one heritage item (Borambil), relocation of another (Westward Cottage) and major earthworks. Devlin Street has moved slightly westward of its 1935 alignment and away from Willandra House. Much of the surviving Ryde village context in the south-western part of Devlin's 1841 subdivision has been destroyed. There is now a permanent and obvious spatial separation of the house from the proposed historical precinct that covers the remnants of the old village.

1996-8 Works associated with the Devlin Street Victoria Road underpass were undertaken 1999: bitumen driveway replaced: new drainage and ground works to the site surrounding the house comprising compacted granite/gravel driveway and pedestrian path to east.

== Heritage listing ==
As at 14 January 2014, Willandra is of cultural heritage significance to the people of New South Wales and Ryde. It has historical significance for its association with the early settlement of the colony of New South Wales and in particular the Ryde area. It is a fine and intact example of a colonial Georgian two storey residence, now rare in the County of Cumberland, if not New South Wales. It has been preserved for future generation as a result of prolonged lobbying by community groups and funding under newly established Federal and State heritage protection legislation.

The area now known as Ryde was the third settlement after Sydney and Parramatta. Willandra is part of a 30-acre grant in the Eastern Farms made to John Small in 1794. It was purchased by James Devlin, stepson to John Small in 1828 and when part of it was subdivided in 1841 as town allotments. It was one of the first two in Kissing Point and formed the core of the emerging Village of Ryde.

It was around this time that James Devlin built a mansion house now known as Willandra, a house which has become a landmark in Ryde and representative of a community's endeavour to ensure the preservation of Ryde's history.

Devlin, born a second generation settler, started his working life as a wheelwright and through his enterprise became a member of the new gentry. He planted most of his land at Kissing Point as orchard, the district being the primary supplier of fruit and vegetables in Sydney. Devlin was later to become one of the first pastoralists in the Riverina District, was a magistrate at Ryde between 1864 and 1872 and instrumental in the establishment of the Municipality of Ryde in 1871 the first Council to which he was elected as an alderman.

Willandra was later owned by several prominent people of the time including Caroline Manning, wife of the merchant John Edye Manning. The Manning family lived at Willandra from around 1874 to 1896. It is believed that the property gained its name some time after federation in 1900. The name being attributed to the Aboriginal word for "rushing water", there being several creeks on the property.

Willandra was fondly remembered by members of the local community for social occasions held there. In more recent times it became a focal point for community concern when it was threatened with demolition. Both the National Trust of Australia (NSW) and the Ryde District Historical Society lobbied for many years to prevent its demise.

The historic and aesthetic value of Willandra had long been recognised and when a proposal to demolish the building arose in the early 1970s the National trust of Australia (NSW) and the Ryde District Historical Society campaigned to save it. Willandra was purchased by Ryde Municipal Council in 1976 with the assistance of a Federal government grant under the national Estate program. It was one of a group of six properties which were the first in New South Wales to receive Federal funding under the national Estates program arising from the first commonwealth legislation enacted for the purpose of protecting the nation's heritage. A further grant from the new South Wales State government under its infant heritage legislation contributed to heritage works.

Willandra is a rare and intact example of a Colonial Georgian residence and was one of the last to be built within the County of Cumberland as farming interest began to extend beyond the inner ring of settlement. Willandra has been described as the quintessential Colonial Georgian house and architecturally very important, one of the best of colonial Georgian houses remaining in Australia. Lucas states that its architectural value is derived from the quality of original detail which has survived, its architecture being of national significance.

Willandra retains a special association for the Ryde District Historical Society, who have been tenants of the property, along with the Ryde District Art Society, since its opening following the completion of the conservation works in 1980.

Willandra was listed on the New South Wales State Heritage Register on 2 April 1999 having satisfied the following criteria.

The place is important in demonstrating the course, or pattern, of cultural or natural history in New South Wales.

Willanda is historically significance for its central role in the attempt to establish a gentry hegemony in the locality during the 1840s following the end of convictism in NSW, for its associations with attempts to transplantthe customas of the English manor to the colony, for its role in the creation of the Village of Ryde, for reinforcing the locality name of Ryde, for its longassociations with persons such as James Devlin and John Edye Manning and for its identification as an element of the nation's architectural heritage in the 1970s.

The place is important in demonstrating aesthetic characteristics and/or a high degree of creative or technical achievement in New South Wales.

Willandra is aesthetically significant as a historic landmark, located in a visually dominant position on the ridge at Ryde, with commanding views of the Parramatta River. The building is a fine and locally rare example of a colonial Regency style manor with quality detailing. With its elevated, corner siting and former grandeur, Willandra has strong visual appeal. The strong, symmetrical form is a reminder of the intended stability and control intended by the Ryde gentry over the rural workers.

The place has a strong or special association with a particular community or cultural group in New South Wales for social, cultural or spiritual reasons.

Willandra is identified as an important item and resided in by community groups. Willandra is held in high esteem by the Ryde Historical Society who are based in the building. It is valued by the Ryde Arts Society for providing a suitable atmospeher for holding art classes and displaying art works. The building is also viewed by members of the community for its unique role in the development of Ryde, for its aesthetic character and its commanding, identifiable setting.

The place has potential to yield information that will contribute to an understanding of the cultural or natural history of New South Wales.

Willandra has technical/research significance because it is an intact form which represents the past manor tradition through its form, siting and relationship to Parramatta River and the Ryde township. The construction/design of the building has arare elements such as sandstone columns which were turned in one piece on a lathe and a geometric staircase (north coast cedar used in the house).

== See also ==
- Australian residential architectural styles

== Notes ==
1. RCC date the acquisition to 1976.
