= Reginald Kerr Manning =

Australian equity, bankruptcy and probate barrister

Mr R. K. Manning; Barrister-at-law
- Born: 1 August 1866; Edgecliff, New South Wales
- Died: 29 October 1943 (aged 77); Bellevue Hill, New South Wales
- Education: Newington College; University of Sydney
- Occupation: Barrister
- Spouse: Mary Constance (née Salter)
- Parents: Caroline Elizabeth Mary; (née) Suttor; John Edye Manning
- Family: 1 daughter 2 sons; William Montagu Manning; Great uncle; George Suttor; Great grandfather

Reginald Kerr Manning (1 August 1866 – 29 October 1943) was a prominent Australian equity, bankruptcy and probate barrister. With Sir George Rich he established and edited The Bankruptcy and Company Law Cases of New South Wales.

== Family ==
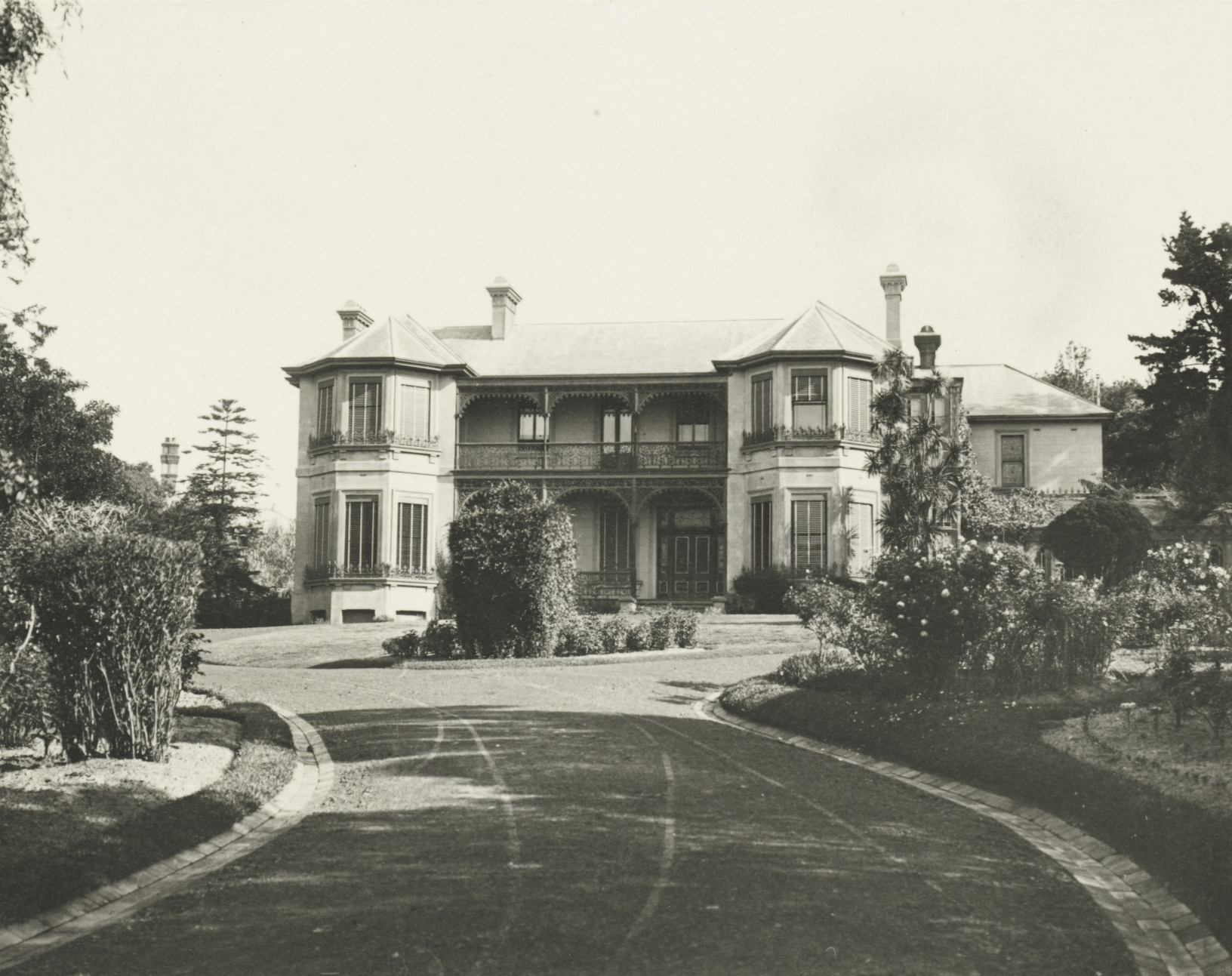
Merioola at Edgecliff in Sydney

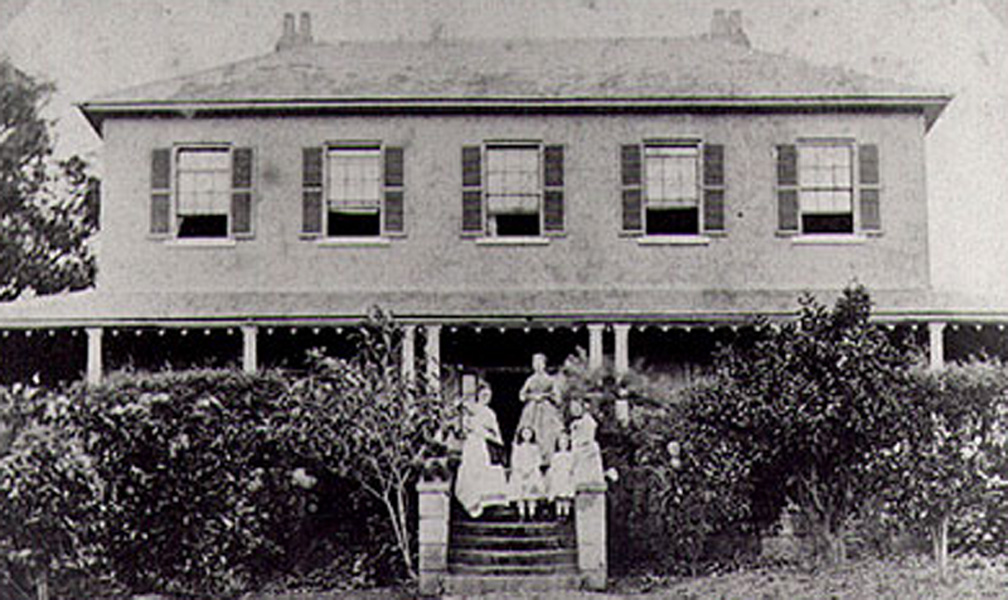
Willandra at Ryde in Sydney

Manning was born into the socially prominent Manning and Suttor families who were influential in the legal, business and pastoral activities of early New South Wales. He was the fourth of 13 children of Caroline Elizabeth Mary (1841–1821) and John Edye Manning (1831–1909).

His mother was the daughter of William Henry Suttor and Charlotte Augusta Ann Francis. Suttor was a wealthy pastoralist and politician who owned the property Brucedale in Bathurst, New South Wales, where Caroline spent her childhood. His father, a merchant, was the son of John Edye Manning (1807–1889) and Fanny Elizabeth Manning and the grandson of John Edye Manning (1783–1870) who was the Registrar of the New South Wales Supreme Court. His parents were married in 1859 and had six boys and seven girls.

Manning was born at Merioola at Edgecliff, his paternal grandparent's home, that was built in 1859. The Victorian mid-century mansion later became famous as an artists' colony before being demolished for suburban subdivision. Manning's maternal grandfather died in 1877 and in accordance with his will Willandra at Ryde, was bought for his mother and held for her in trust. This became the Manning family home until 1894. Willandra, which still stands, was described at the time as "a most comfortable family residence, overlooking the Parramatta River within a mile of the railway and steamer. Contains 18 lofty and spacious rooms, outoffices, stables etc. Water and gas laid on. Tennis lawns, fruit and flower gardens.

John Edye Manning became involved in a sensational divorce case where he was named as the co-respondent. He was found guilty and was ordered by the Court to pay 2000 pounds. The case was reported widely in newspapers in March 1894. Manning's family left Australia for England. The United Kingdom Census of 1901 shows that John and Caroline and their five youngest children were living at 28 London Road, Reigate, a market town in Surrey. John Edye Manning died at Reigate in 1909 and Caroline Manning died twelve years later in 1921 in Kensington aged 79 years. Manning remained in Sydney and in that year he married Mary Constance Salter.

== Education ==
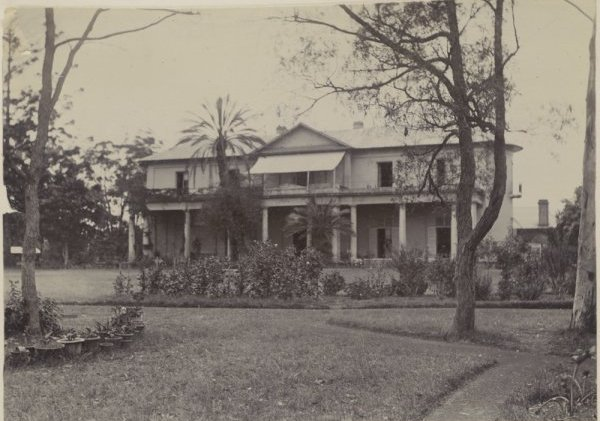
Newington at Silverwater

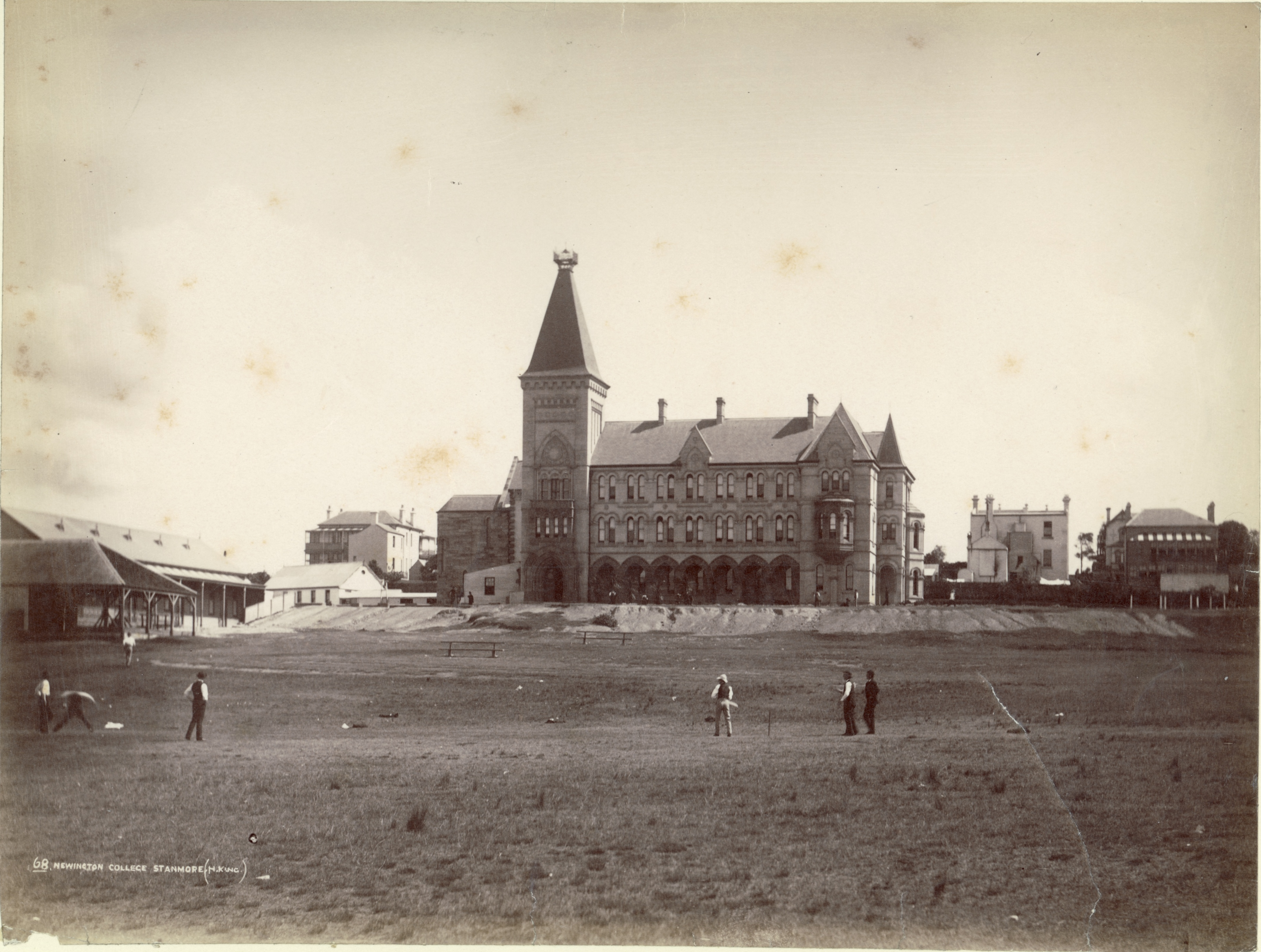
Newington at Stanmore

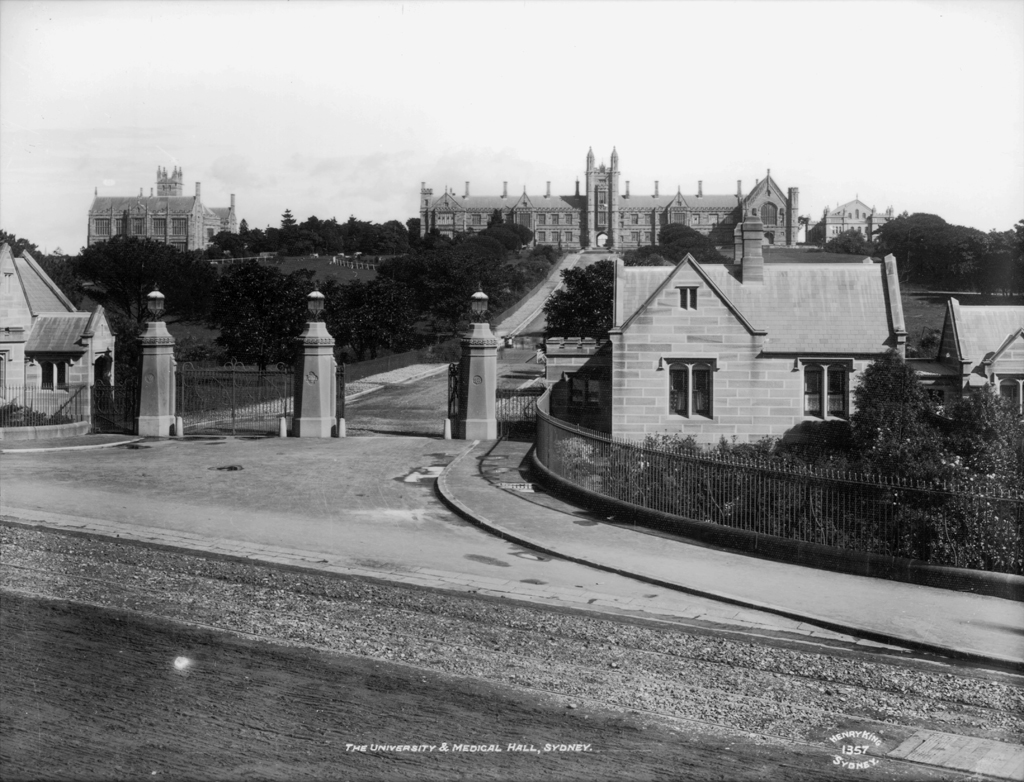
University of Sydney

=== New South Wales ===
By 1871 the Manning family were renting a substantial Victorian Rustic Gothic style stone house, Clifton Villa, in Balmain. Manning was enrolled at Sydney Grammar School in October 1876 but left the school less than twelve months later, in June 1877. He then attended a local denominational school. On 1 October 1878, aged 12, Manning commenced education at Newington College in Newington House on the Parramatta River at Silverwater, New South Wales. The school was a short trip up river from the new Manning family domicile of Willandra at Ryde. The Rev. Joseph Horner Fletcher was the Principal and Joseph Coates was the Head Master. Manning was placed in the 3rd Form. In 1880, with the move of Newington College to Stanmore in Sydney, he was placed in the Lower Sixth Form. He passed the University Junior Examination in 1880 and again in 1881. In 1882 he passed the University Senior Examination and left Newington at the end of that year. The Senior Examination was held by the University of Sydney on behalf of the New South Wales Government but was not a matriculation exam.

=== Tasmania ===
From 1859 until 1889 the Tasmanian Council of Education held annual examinations for the Degree of Associate of Arts and awarded scholarships to enable students to study at a university in the United Kingdom. The Manning family had extensive interests in northern Tasmania and in 1883 Manning attended Launceston Grammar School and sat for the Tasmanian exam. He took the Associate Degree in December 1883 and was awarded the first mathematical prizes at the same examination.

=== University ===
Instead of studying abroad Manning used his associate degree as entry to the University of Sydney and in 1887 he graduated with a Bachelor of Arts. While at the university he was a resident of St Andrew's College.

== Legal career & later life ==
Manning was admitted as a member of the New South Wales Bar in August 1889 and in March 1890 he was appointed as clerk associate to his uncle His Honour Mr Justice Charles Manning. In August 1895 Manning and his young wife purchased land in Finlay Avenue Roseville. Between 1895 and 1896 they commissioned the architectural firm Castleden & Lake to build a house on that block of land. On 24 September 1903, Manning was appointed as a Crown Prosecutor in Dubbo. During those years the Manning family and their young children lived in Sydney while Manning commuted weekly to Dubbo in Western NSW.

On returning to Sydney Manning, and his wife and three children, resided at Wandeen in Rangers Road, Neutral Bay. He was a member of the Council of the New South Wales Bar Association from 1912 until 1933. Manning maintained chambers in Sydney until 1940 with his last appearance before the High Court of Australia being in August 1938.

== Children and death ==
Manning died at his residence Inverness in Birriga Road, Bellevue Hill. He was survived by his wife Constance Mary Innes Manning (née Salter 1868–1861) and his sons, Reginald Lance Manning, a solicitor of Narrabri, New South Wales, and Neville Horace Manning, a wool broker of Sydney, New South Wales. His daughter, Phyllis Mary Manning, died in 1920 when she was in a motor vehicle accident. She was a passenger in a side car with her brother driving the motor cycle. They were hit by another vehicle and were both thrown to the ground. She suffered a skull fracture and died immediately whereas her brother only sustained a fractured right arm and he survived.
