= Reginald Manning =

Reginald Manning may refer to:

- Reg Manning (1905–1986), American artist and illustrator
- Reginald Kerr Manning (1866–1943), Australian equity, bankruptcy and probate barrister
