= Silverwater Prison Complex Conservation Area =

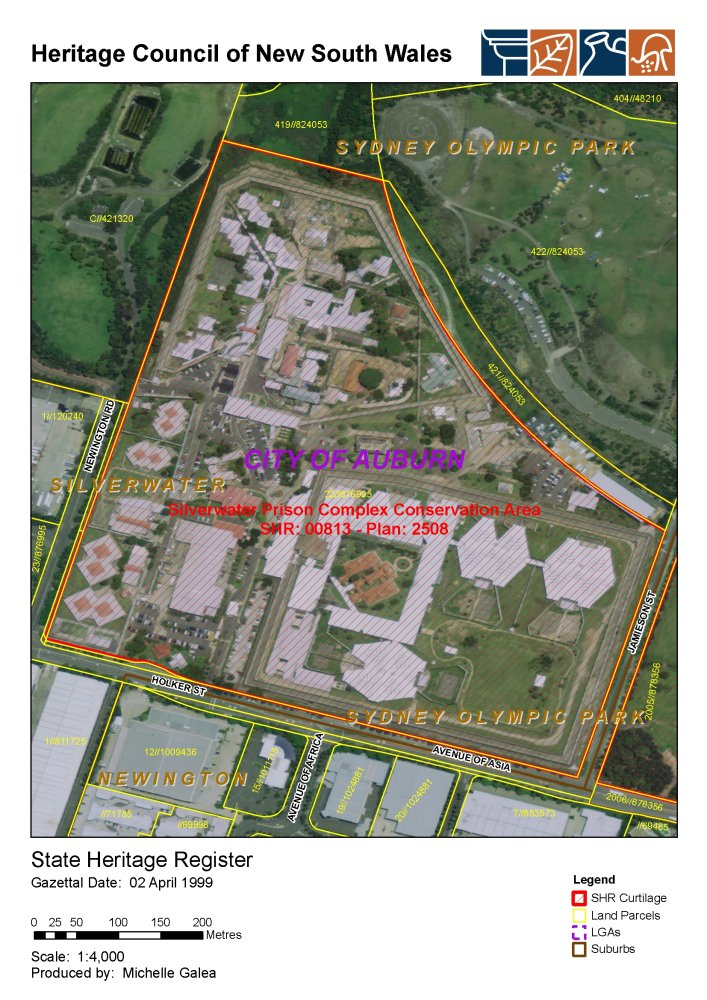
- Heritage boundaries

- Location within Sydney
- 33°49′45″S 151°03′24″E
- Location: Holker Street, Silverwater, Cumberland Council, New South Wales, Australia

History
- Built: 1829–1850

Site notes
- Architect(s): John Verge; Walter Liberty Vernon
- Owner: Corrective Services NSW

New South Wales Heritage Register
- Official name: Silverwater Prison Complex Conservation Area; Silverwater Correctional Centre; Mulawa Correctional Centre; Silverwater Gaol; Newington Estate; Silverwater State Hospital; State Hospital & Asylum for Women
- Type: state heritage (complex / group)
- Designated: 2 April 1999
- Reference no.: 813
- Type: Gaol/Lock-up
- Category: Law Enforcement

Silverwater Prison Complex Conservation Area is a heritage-listed complex consisting of a historic house (Newington House) and various prison structures associated with what is now known as the Silverwater Correctional Complex, located at Holker Street, Silverwater, Cumberland Council, New South Wales, Australia. It was designed by John Verge and Walter Liberty Vernon and built from 1829 to 1850. It is also known as Silverwater Correctional Centre, Mulawa Correctional Centre, Silverwater Gaol, Newington Estate, Silverwater State Hospital and State Hospital & Asylum for Women. The property is owned by Corrective Services NSW. It was added to the New South Wales State Heritage Register on 2 April 1999.

== History ==
The site that became Newington estate formed part of the territory occupied by the Wangal clan (of which Bennelong is the best known) that formed part of the larger Darug (coastal) language group. The Wangal clan or tribe were documented as having occupied the southern side of the harbour from Long Cove to Parramatta and Rose Hill. Known archaeological sites along the Parramatta River and hinterland record fishing activities adjacent to the Newington Armory and bark from trees within the vicinity of the site were cut for use as shelters. Limited observations of Aboriginal life in the Homebush Bay area are recorded. Records from neighbouring areas would suggest that the Wangal would have actively participated in river fishing, eeling, gathering shellfish as well as hunting kangaroos, wallabies and other small land mammals, reptiles and waterfowl.

Land grants in the area started as early as 1797 after an exploration party with Governor John Hunter up the Parramatta and Duck and George's Rivers. Shortly after, two officers, formerly of HMS Sirius, Lieutenant John Shortland and Captain Henry Waterhouse, each received a grant of 25 acres, which they stocked with animals especially brought from the Cape of Good Hope (South Africa). A First Fleeter marine, Isaac Archer, was next lessee, receiving his 80-acre grant next to Shortland Farm on 26 August 1800. The Waterhouse grant was known as Waterhouse Farm and later formed part of the grounds of Newington. These earliest grants were made north of Parramatta Road, because the sole means of transport then was the Parramatta River, adjacent to the north.

In 1800 Richard Aitkens took out a lease on land east of Duck River and north of the Sydney-Parramatta Road, but it was soon cancelled. The area was included in a grant of 1290 acres made in 1807 to John Blaxland (1769–1845), who arrived in the colony that year, as a wealthy free settler. The grant covered all the land between the Parramatta River and Parramatta Road, Duck River and Haslam's Creek, except for land held by Waterhouse, Shortland, Archer and Haslam.

A farm or rural villa estate, factory and saltworks were established and Blaxland's "Newington House" built between 1829 and 1832. The name commemorated Blaxland's family property in Kent. John Blaxland and his younger brother Gregory (the explorer) began to develop a cattle industry, breeding fat cattle, and slaughtering and salting them. They were the first to produce usable salt, made from brine gathered from the marshes on the river near the house. The site of the Queen Victoria Building in George Street, Sydney was used by Blaxland to graze some of their herds of cattle. Blaxland had been promised 8000 acres before he left for NSW, but it was not until 1831 that he was finally given the full quota of his land, when he received 10,240 acres in different areas. He finally held 29,000 acres in the colony.

The present Newington house was built in the style of an English Regency-style mansion, with disciplined English gardens, and a private chapel (St.Augustine's) built in 1838. The house was and remains an integral element in a landscaped setting (with the chapel off to its eastern side) which has been somewhat altered over time due to its location in the grounds of a correctional centre. Elements of the landscaped grounds of the house are extant, including scattered individual and groups of mature tree plantings and the outline of the formal carriage loop north of the house. The carriageway fabric today is a mix of gravel and broken concrete. No original 1830s fabric remains on or near the ground surface.

In the 1840s a monolithic sandstone verandah colonnade was added to house. Blaxland died in 1845 and the family moved away, leasing the property to owners of a slaughtering industry. After Blaxland's death the property was used to manufacture salt and slaughtering, the home's kitchens were converted into a piggery and its once beautiful dining room used as a barn- the house was considerably neglected.

The house had carriage loops to its east and north with 2 prominent hoop (Araucaria cunninghamii) and Norfolk Island (A.heterophylla) pines, garden beds cut into lawn areas and spikey plants (e.g.: Agave sp. in a pedestal urn and New Zealand cabbage trees (Cordyline australis) nearer to the house. A pond and 3 tiered fountain was site east of the house in the centre of a grass "island" between two drives. A 1953 photograph from the same location shows the hoop pines gone and 3 prominent Canary Island palms (Phoenix canariensis) east and north of the house.

In 1863 Rev. John Manton, a Methodist clergyman, who had been engaged to undertake missionary pastoral work in the newly developed city of Parramatta, acquired (by lease) Newington on behalf of the Methodist Church to start a boys' school. By 16 July 1863, his objective had been achieved, and 19 boys formed the nucleus of what was to become the third of the GPS schools, Newington College. 16 boys enrolled on 16 July (ranging from age 7-16) from as far afield as Goulburn and Yass (two already lived on the Newington Estate), with several more enrolling on the following days. Two who entered on 20 July were the first Theological students.

While the new school was a major undertaking for the Wesleyan Methodists, they had already been involved in developing education in the colony for more than two decades. A short-lived Wesleyan Grammar School was founded in 1840, followed by a number of day schools based on existing Sunday Schools. From 1849, the Wesleyans, along with the other major churches, operated many denominational day schools, which continued until the NSW Public Schools Act of 1866. Newington College's founding was part of the developments that transformed the education landscape in New South Wales from the 1860s to the 1880s. While Manton and his colleagues advocated for a secondary school, some Wesleyans were more concerned to see a university college, while still others advocated for an institution for training ministers.

A week later some two hundred people, many travelling by chartered steamer from Sydney, gathered there for the formal inauguration. The opening was the culmination of years of advocacy and fund raising within the Wesleyan community across NSW. One of the most tireless advocates was Rev. Marnton, a Wesleyan minister who had served as chaplain at the penal colony of Port Arthur and later founded Horton College at Ross, in Tasmania's midlands. He was appointed Principal when the establishment of the new school was finally approved by the Church in January 1863 and served in this role until his untimely death in the following year.

The College's first home was the Georgian mansion built by Blaxland. Extensive repairs were just one task completed before the school could move in. Another was securing teachers. Masters sought from England had not arrived before the opening day. Mantion regarded the arrival in Sydney of 22-year old Rev. James Egan Moulton at the end of May 1863 as a gift from God. Moulton served as initial "Head Master" until November 1863. The college's location meant that all the early period students were boarders.

The old bell, which had summoned Blaxland's convict servants, now called the boys to lessons, and free hours could be spent roaming the surrounding gardens and parklands. The chapel was later used as a school room for Newington College from the 1860s. During the College's occupation the house was restored.

The site at Silverwater was only leased and provided no long term security for a growing school. In 1869, the Methodist Conference decided to use land bequeathed to the Church at Stanmore, in Sydney's inner west, as a permanent home for the College. Between 1876 and 1880, the Gothic sandstone building familiar to later generations of students was built, financed through fund raising and a massive loan. The school moved to Stanmore in July 1880.

In 1880 the school was moved to its present site at Stanmore (Canterbury Road). The 19 original pupils had by then swelled to several hundred, but the first headmaster, John Manton, did not live to see the changeover. He died in September 1864 and was buried at Parramatta, the pupils of the first Newington forming a marching guard of honour along the whole route.

Part of the site was bought by the NSW government in 1880 as an asylum for aged destitute women. In 1881 the site was subdivided. By 1887 the house was the centre of the Silverwater State Hospital/State Hospital & Asylum (retaining this role until 1969). The Dormitory Block built in 1896 was intended for this purpose.

Between 1911 and 1918 the asylum was converted for use as a State Hospital. Irwin House and the Engineer's Cottage were built at this time.

A 1911 photograph taken east of Newington House looking west shows carriage loops east and north with 2 prominent hoop (Araucaria cunninghamii) and Norfolk Island (A.heterophylla) pines, garden beds cut into lawn areas and spikey plants (e.g.: Agave sp. in a pedestal urn and New Zealand cabbage trees (Cordyline australis) nearer the house. A pond and 3 tiered fountain was east of the house in the centre of a grass "island" between two drives. A 1953 photograph from the same location shows the hoop pines gone and 3 prominent Canary Island palms (Phoenix canariensis) east and north of the house.

In 1968/9 the Department of Corrective Services took over management of the site for use as the Silverwater Correctional Centre (SCC), a new minimum security men's prison and women's prison (Mulawa Correctional Centre MCC). Development occurred on the site throughout the next 20 years, although it was not until 1985 that a major redevelopment of the site took place when an expansion of the present built form was undertaken to the north and west. Significant buildings were constructed between 1986–88 to enable additional accommodation at Mulawa.

In the early 1990s additions to the facility included a minimum security facility and periodic detention centre.

The topography of the surrounding site to the north and north west, namely Millenium Parklands, has substantially changed as part of the preparation for the 2000 Sydney Olympic Games, and development of the Parklands. This has included large areas of ground grading and addition of extensive amounts of fill (contaminated soil and subsoil), formed into landscaped spiral mounds. The Parklands now physically cut off the former connection of the Newington Estate to the Parramatta River.

A new Mental Health Assessment Unit and Clinic was approved in early 2004 as part of a current program to improve facilities at MCC.

=== Modifications and dates ===
- 1807: 1290 acre grant made to John Blaxland
- 1829–32: A farm, factory and saltworks established and
- c.1832: house built
- c.1832: Newington house built in the style of an English mansion, with disciplined English gardens
- 1838: a private chapel (St.Augustine's) built
- 1840s: monolithic sandstone verandah colonnade added to house
- 1845: John Blaxland died. Property used to manufacture salt. House considerably neglected.
- 1863: 19 boys formed the nucleus of what was to become the third of the GPS schools, Newington College, with surrounding gardens and parklands. During the * College's occupation the house was restored.
- 1860s: on the chapel was used as a school room for Newington College
- 1880: the school moved to Stanmore. Part of the site was bought by the NSW government in 1880 as an asylum for aged women.
- 1881: site subdivided.
- 1887: by then the house was the centre of the Silverwater State Hospital (retaining this role until 1969).
- 1896: Dormitory Block built for the asylum.
- Between 1911 and 1918: asylum converted for use as a State Hospital. Irwin House and the Engineer's Cottage were built at this time.
- 1968–69: the Department of Corrective Services took over the site as the Silverwater Correctional Centre (SCC), a new minimum security men's prison and women's prison (Mulawa Correctional Centre MCC). Development occurred on the site throughout the next 20 years, although it was not until 1985 that a major redevelopment of the site took place.
- 1985: a major redevelopment of the site occurred – an expansion of the present built form was undertaken to the north and west. Significant buildings were constructed between 1986–88 to enable additional accommodation at Mulawa.
- Early 1990s: additions to the facility included a minimum security facility and periodic detention centre. Newington House refurbished and used as DOCS administration centre on site.
- 1995–96: Metropolitan Remand Reception Centre constructed around Irwin House in eastern half of site. Maximum security men's prison facility. Mulawa Correctional Centre (Women's Prison) built in western third of site, incorporating Caroline Chisholm Building, Margaret Catchpole House (both 1880s hospital era buildings), other c.1910 hospital era buildings to east, and former superintendent's house to north east. Men's minimum security prison facility constructed also.
- 1999–2000: The topography of the surrounding site to the north and north west, namely Millenium Parklands, has substantially changed as part of the preparation for the 2000 Sydney Olympic Games, and development of the Parklands. This has included large areas of ground grading and addition of extensive amounts of fill (contaminated soil and subsoil), formed into landscaped spiral mounds. The Parklands now physically cut off the former connection of the Newington Estate to the Parramatta River.
- c. 2002–04: Newington House: renovation works to create new toilet facilities for staff - new concrete floor, partitioning and fittings
- 2004: A new Mental Health Assessment Unit and Clinic located within Mulawa CC was approved in early 2004 as part of a current program to improve facilities at MCC.

== Description ==
Newington is now part of a prison complex, the Silverwater Correctional Centre.

The site still includes significant trees that lined the main north-south and east-west avenues on the estate, and all inner and outer grounds. The Blaxland Estate was famous for its landscaped gardens and orchards. During the later phase of use of the site as an Asylum and State Hospital, pavilion buildings were erected within the landscaped setting.

=== Newington House ===
Newington House is a two-storey Regency Villa, built between 1829 and 1832, in the style of an English mansion, with disciplined English gardens. In its heyday the Blaxland Estate was famous for its landscaped gardens and orchards. The house today is located in the centre of the Silverwater Corrective Centre. The main front of the house is symmetrical, with a central pedimented break-front. The main entrance door is surmounted by a decorative fanlight. The design has been variously attributed to John Verge and Henry Cooper however no original drawings have been located. Newington House was one of the subjects of architect and writer William Hardy Wilson's romanticised drawings of colonial architecture in NSW published in the 1920s. House is now (2004) used as administration block of the Silverwater Corrective Centre.

Archaeological excavation and monitoring has revealed deposits and features relating to the construction of Newington House, in addition to aspects of its alteration and refurbishment. Key conclusions are:

- the sandstone staircase providing access to the verandah appears to be largely original in terms of its location, approximate size and fabric. Despite evidence for repair, it is also likely to be roughly contemporary in construction date with the house;
- recent (1995) activities have impacted upon the steps to the extent that only a portion of the original fabric survives. Work by the Dept. of Public Works undertaken in the current project has endeavoured to stabilise, retain and incorporate this fabric into the ongoing maintenance and refurbishment programme of Newington House;
- the changes evident in the fabric of the verandah floor and its relative height which have occurred since construction, in addition to the alteration and/or repair of the western verandah sandstone wall and colonnade, provide evidence for the range of transformation Newington has undergone since construction. The archaeological evidence is complementary with the available historical information.

The four brick vents identified under the verandah and the archaeological deposits filling the verandah cavity space are likely to be contemporary with the construction of Newington House and the cellar. The strongest evidence for this is derived from the close similarity of the brickwork and mortar which is evident in the formwork of each of these three features.

The quantity and form of the bricks and mortar suggests it is likely that the building materials for the house, cellar, verandah and cavity fill were manufactured on site.

=== Garden and carriage loop ===
Elements of the former house garden, and estate landscaping remain today, mostly scattered individual and groups of mature tree plantings, the outline of the formal carriage loop north of the house (marked by brick and concrete kerb edging today), and now isolated elements elsewhere such as mature trees, an avenue of rainforest tree species and palms going north from the house towards the river, and more detailed elements such as a pedestal and urn, east of the house on the edge of the former carriage loop.

Close to the house's northwest corner is an extremely rare shrub or small tree specimen, reputedly planted c.1840 during the Blaxland residency, the South African species Boer or Hottentot bean (Schotia afra, family Caesalpinaceae), related to the parrot flower tree (S. brachypetala), itself rare in NSW. A sign near the shrub claims this is the only one in the Southern Hemisphere, perhaps inflated, unless it is now extinct in its home regions, but this could be the only such specimen in NSW or Australia.

Tree plantings lining or near the former carriage loop north of the house include Canary Island date palms (Phoenix canariensis), southern nettle tree (Celtis australis), cotton palms (Washingtonia robusta) with their tall, clean trunks to 20m high.

East of the house towards the family chapel are groves of trees, some older (pre 1900), some more recent 20th century plantings – perhaps 1950–70s. These include: west of the house: Norfolk Island hibiscus/cow itch tree, (Lagunaria patersonae), Canary Island date palms; south of the house more C.I.date palms, a golden Monterey cypress, Cupressus macrocarpa 'Aurea'; east of the house a Qld. black bean tree, (Castanospermum australe), two Mediterranean cypresses, (Cupressus sempervirens).

East of the house and outside the carriage loop, towards the chapel, are groves of Bhutan cypress (C. torulosa), Qld. lacebarks (Brachychiton discolor), a clump of African olive (former hedge plant in colonial gardens), Cock's comb coral tree (Erythrina christa-galli), African coral tree (E. caffra), cotton palms and a species of pine tree (Pinus sp.) nearer the chapel.

The avenue of trees towards the river comprises bunya-bunya pines (Araucaria bidwillii), hoop pines (A. cunninghamii), Moreton Bay figs (Ficus macrophylla), Canary Island date palms (Phoenix canariensis) and swamp mahoganies (Eucalyptus robusta), the latter of which may be later plantings. This former walkway planting may date to the 1860s–1900, the main period of popularisation and fashionability of these species, and their promotion by such public figures as then Directors of the Royal Botanic Garden, Sydney, Charles Moore and Joseph Maiden. These men provided such species to many public institutions such as parks, hospitals, asyla etc. Cotton and Canary Island date palms were also commonly promoted species in this period.

Close to Holker Street and the jail's main entry are large specimens of Hill's fig (Ficus x hillii) and Moreton Bay figs (F. macrophylla), transplanted from estate remnants to the east of the current entry driveway as part of a redevelopment of the main entry. These trees are at least of 1880s vintage, possibly older to the 1860s.

=== Chapel ===
A private chapel (St.Augustine's) built in 1838. The chapel is a single storey rendered brick building with corner buttresses and a rectangular floor plan. The design has been described as Gothicised Georgian as it features not only pilasters, a string course and a pedimented gable but also Gothic Revival style pointed arches, rudimentary tracery with amber glass and quatrefoil vents. A marble plaque, dated 1838, sits above the main entrance.

=== Irwin House ===
Between 1911 and 1918 the asylum was converted for use as a State Hospital. During the phase of use of the site as an Asylum and State Hospital, pavilion buildings were erected within the landscaped setting. Irwin House and the Engineer's Cottage were built at this time. Irwin House is a domestic scaled face brick building comprising three distinct wings with verandahs to each elevation. The design of the building, probably by the Government Architect, Walter Liberty Vernon, draws on the tradition of military hospitals developed for hot climates. Few examples of hospital buildings, and even fewer examples of staff accommodation remain that date from this period.

Irwin House is now the centrepiece of a landscaped formal courtyard space within the Men's Correctional Centre.

=== Former Engineer's House/Children's Cottage ===
Located in southwest of complex close to Holker Street. Between 1911 and 1918 the asylum was converted for use as a State Hospital. Irwin House and the Engineer's Cottage were built at this time. The Prisoner's Children Cottage, formerly the Engineer's House, is a single storey Federation styled cottage with a corrugated metal iron roof. The building retains a verandah to the west and south, but part of the original verandah has been removed and rooms added at the southeast corner. Internally, walls are rendered with timber architraves, skirting and panelled doors and plaster ceilings. All fireplaces have been bricked up except the kitchen which is now recessed. The Federation attributes are demonstrated by the massing, roof forms (and detail), verandah joinery, ceiling details, the use of stained glass in windows and the range of window types used in the building.

=== Former Superintendent's House ===
The building has historic and aesthetic values as a good example of two storey Federation domestic architecture. The aesthetic values of the building are heightened by its setting as an individual building in an established garden setting, adjacent to a remnant landscaped walk formed by mature rainforest tree species and palms, including Moreton Bay fig (Ficus macrophylla), hoop pine (Araucaria cunninghamii), bunya-bunya pine (A.bidwillii), cotton palms (Washingtonia robusta) and swamp mahogany ('Eucalyptus robusta').

=== Caroline Chisholm Building (Former Hospital Building) ===
This is a two-storey rendered brick building dating from c. 1880s. Grounds to south west include several large (possibly 1880s/1900 vintage) camphor laurel trees (Cinnamomum camphora), and immediately south of the building include tree ferns (Cyathea sp.).

=== Margaret Catchpole Building (Former Hospital Building) ===
This is a two-storey rendered brick building dating from c. 1980s.

=== Morgan House (Former Hospital Building) ===
This is a single storey Federation style brick building dating from c. 1910, linked with a c. 1980s extension "Step-down" facility for mental health care patients to the Rose Scott building.

=== Mum Shirl Unit (Former Rose Scott Building, Hospital Building) ===
This is a single storey Federation style brick building dating from c. 1910.

=== Former Solarium (Former Hospital Building) ===
This is a c. 1929 Interwar cottage form with timber pedimented gables, converted for office use

=== Chapel (Former Toilet Building) ===
This is a brick, single storey building west of the Margaret Catchpole Building. It was converted to chapel use c. 1996. Immediately south of the chapel is a tree of heaven (Ailanthus altissima), possibly a sucker of an older specimen from the former estate or hospital periods.

== Heritage listing ==
Silverwater Correctional Centre is of exceptional significance as: it is the core remaining part of John Blaxland's Newington Estate and of the State Hospital & Asylum for Women, for its subdivision and subsequent use for a variety of institutional functions, as an expression of a philosophy regarding the care of the aged. Silverwater Prison Complex Conservation Area was listed on the New South Wales State Heritage Register on 2 April 1999.

Individual components of significance include:

=== Newington House ===
Newington House is a significant and relatively well-preserved example of the rural colonial villa, and is an significant reminder of the westward expansion towards Parramatta and the Blue Mountains, and the historical development of land along the Parramatta River. It reflects the standard of living of prominent individuals and families from early settlement period. With Elizabeth Bay House and Camden Park, it is one of the three major historic houses in the County of Cumberland.

It is associated with a notable NSW family, being built for John Blaxland, whose entrepreneurial business activities were amongst the earliest in the colony, and whose more famous explorer brother Gregory assisted in activities generally relative to this site. Its use since initial occupation as the Blaxland house has reflected a number of social changes in use as a college, asylum/hospital, and prison administration building. It has continued to be the prominent building on the site and accommodated senior officers in each phase of its history.

The house is unusual in architectural terms, for its character rather than its quality; externally it forms a typical Regency structure, its initial conception somewhat marred by the awkward later placement of the verandah, which however presents a fine portal to the house. Internally the main items of significance are the room layout and the rigorous but rustic character of its joinery, where aspirations to the manner and style of a (John) Verge house are seen in primitive form, revealing more general standards of workmanship of the day, and thus the joinery is idiosyncratic in detail rather than of refined quality.

The building has aesthetic value in its relationship with the family chapel and with Parramatta River, although the latter has been diminished by landfilling operations on the former tip site to the north. The remaining garden setting of the house, which includes the carriage loops, is also aesthetically significant notwithstanding the positioning of the Mulawa Correctional Centre security fence. In its heyday the Estate was famous for its landscaped gardens and orchards.

=== Chapel ===
St. Augustine's Chapel is a simple, substantial demonstration of the strong religious convictions of early settlers. It has social significance in being associated with a range of occupants of the site, including weekend chapel/weekday school rooms during the Blaxland family era, classroom during the Newington College occupancy, residential accommodation during the asylum/hospital era and a chapel during the prison phase.

=== Surrounds ===
An area of great historical interest and significance as the focus of the site containing the essential components of the original Newington House surrounds and chapel. The significant elements include:

- the carriage loop in front (north) of the house currently divided by a security fence and the trees and shrubs in and around it;
- the carriage loop east of the house with the service and formal parts, the trees and shrubs around it, the bollard on the corner and pond;
- the open landscape between the house and the chapel;
- the remaining relationship of Newington House and the Parramatta River (once its sole means of access);
- the archaeologically sensitive area at the rear of Newington House and the site of Blaxland's original cottage and other outbuildings and structures (e.g.: well); and
- the archaeologically sensitive area east of the chapel where the former vault was located and in general around the chapel.

The trees of significance in this precinct include a group of Araucarias (bunya pines & hoop pines) and Moreton Bay figs (Ficus macrophylla) in the Mulawa Correctional Centre compound (remnant of a former landscaped walk to the river), the extremely rare Schotia afra (Kaffir bean, Boer bean) and the surviving turpentines (Syncarpia glomulifera) which are likely to be indigenous to the site.(modified, Read, S., 2004)

=== Irwin House ===
Irwin House is of considerable heritage significance as:

- a well designed Federation building (believed to be former Nurses' Quarters) of outstanding architectural merit represented by fine details in the timber verandah, the roof, gable ends, chimneys and the brickwork and sandstone detailing;
- having unusual design as no other hospital buildings of this type are known from the period c. 1895 possibly for staff accommodation (medical nursing and domestic staff);
- being sympathetically planned in an open lawn landscape with trees, including an avenue, all of which provide an attractive setting for the building (Philip Cox et al., 1993)

=== Engineer's Cottage (former) ===
The Engineer's Cottage's principal significance is that it forms part of the complex of buildings and grounds erected during the early phase of transition of the site to the State Hospital & Asylum for Women. As part of this complex it was a key building in providing accommodation for the site engineer. It has played a role as a dormitory/support building to the core areas of the site in each of the changes of use of the complex since 1913. Hence its continuity of use and association with the main complex are also significant.

The cottage has historic and aesthetic values as a good example of Federation domestic architecture and particularly of the work of the Government Architect's office in the time of Walter Liberty Vernon. The Federation attributes are demonstrated by the massing, roof forms (and detail), verandah joinery, ceiling details, the use of stained glass in windows and the range of window types used in the building. The degree of intactness of the Federation elements is a key element of the building's aesthetic significance. The aesthetic value of the building is heightened by its setting as an individual building in a garden setting

=== Superintendent's Cottage (former) ===
The aesthetic values of the former Superintendent's House building are heightened by its setting as an individual building in an established garden setting, adjacent to a remnant landscaped walk formed by mature rainforest tree species and palms, including Moreton Bay fig (Ficus macrophylla), hoop pine (Araucaria cunninghamii), bunya-bunya pine (A.bidwillii), cotton palms (Washingtonia robusta) and swamp mahogany (Eucalyptus robusta).

=== Landscape ===
The process of redevelopment and adaptation to new uses that has characterised the site has resulted in the site having low overall landscape integrity. What remains is a series of individual species and smaller groups or avenues of trees representative of previous occupations and uses. The site has been divided up into a number of precincts to assess the significance of this landscape and buildings in their setting.

== See also ==
- Prisons in New South Wales
