= William Kelynack =

Cornish Australian Methodist minister

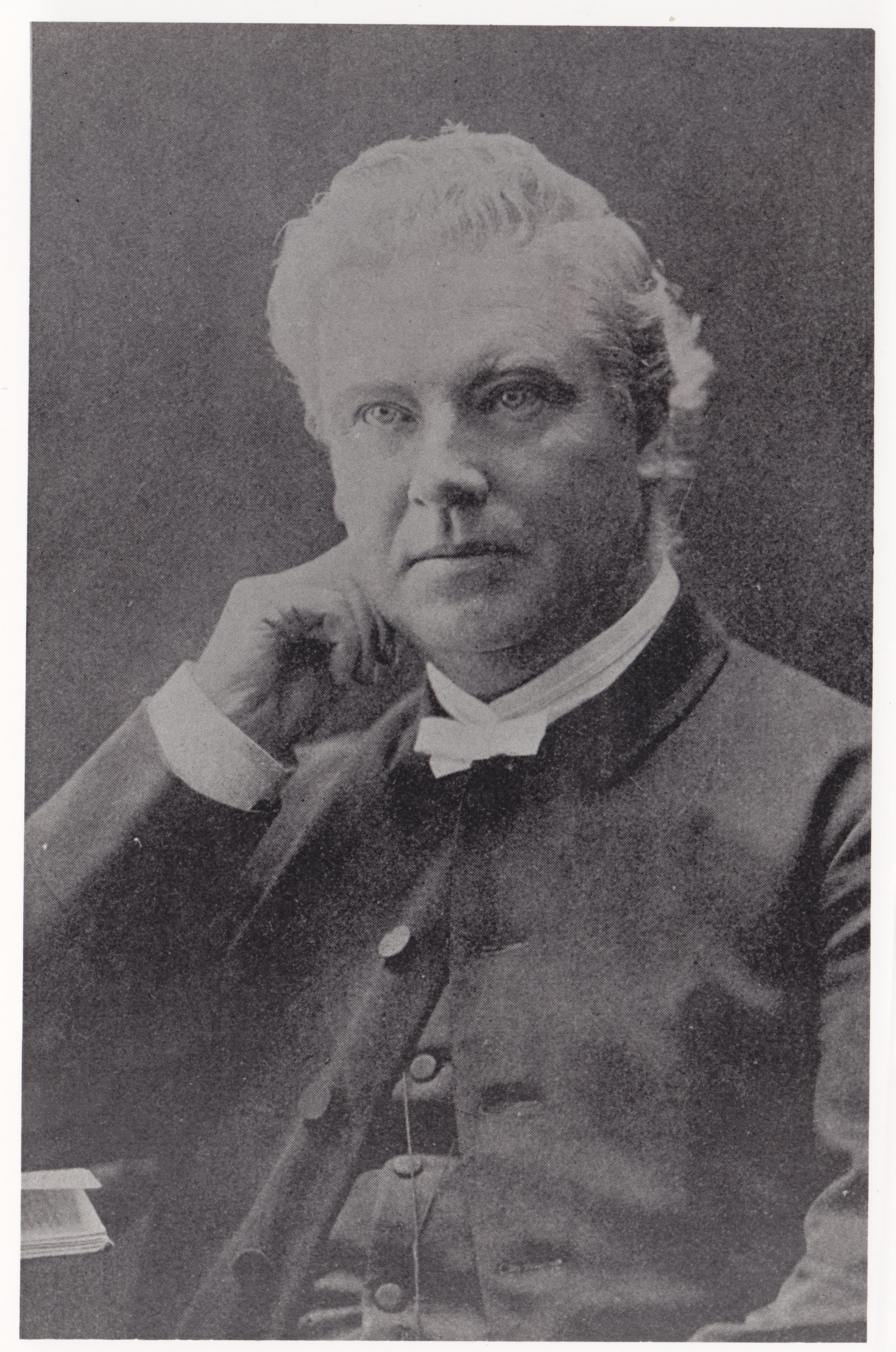
William Kelynack (1831–1891), Methodist minister.

William Kelynack (22 May 1831 – 1 November 1891) was a Cornish Australian Methodist minister, President of Newington College, and President of the General Conference of the Australasian Wesleyan Methodist Church.

== Early life ==
Kelynack was born at Newlyn, Cornwall, and was educated in Penzance. He briefly taught in a private school before taking up mercantile pursuits. Aged 18, he became a local preacher and four years later entered the Wesleyan ministry.

== Australian ministry ==
Kelynack arrived in Sydney in 1854, with fellow Cornishman and minister William Curnow, and he served in the Bathurst circuit until 1856, whence he transferred to Braidwood and then to Yass in 1860.

In 1862 he married Lucy Hannah Houlding of Sydney.

After appointments to Chippendale, Parramatta and Wollongong he served in York Street, Sydney (1865–67) and Surry Hills (1868–70). During the 1860s, Kelynack was a councillor of Newington College, a committee member of Sydney City Mission, and became co-editor of the Christian Advocate and Wesleyan Record with William Curnow. In 1870 he was transferred to Goulburn where he was district chairman and in 1874 he returned to Bathurst.

== England and America tour ==
Kelynack returned to the United Kingdom in 1877 to visit his ailing mother. While there he addressed the British Methodist Conference and raised £3000 for Newington College. He returned to Australia via the United States of America where he addressed the students at Drew Theological Seminary and preached in New York City, Baltimore and Chicago. During his tour, he was awarded a doctorate in divinity by the University of New Orleans.

== Church leadership ==
On his return to Sydney in 1878, Kelynack was appointed to the Bourke Street Church and two years later was elected president of the New South Wales and Queensland Annual Conference. In the 1880s he was a general secretary of Foreign Missions and travelled widely in the Pacific, raising £6000 in funds. Kelynack succeeded Joseph Horner Fletcher as president of Newington College in 1887. In May 1890 he was elected president of the Sixth General Conference of the Australasian Wesleyan Methodist Church.

He died from Bright's disease survived by his wife, Lucy, and by seven sons and four daughters.

== Bibliography ==
- Jubilee Newingtonian 1863–1913 (Syd, 1914)
- J. Colwell (ed), A Century in the Pacific (Syd, 1914)
- J. E. Carruthers, Lights in the Southern Sky (Syd, 1924)
- D. S. Macmillan, Newington College 1863–1963 (Syd, 1963)
- P. L. Swain, Newington Across the Years 1863–1998 (Syd, 1999)

Preceded by Rev Joseph Horner Fletcher	President; Newington College; 1887–1891	Succeeded by Rev James Egan Moulton
