= Joseph Horner Fletcher =

West Indies-born Methodist minister of English descent

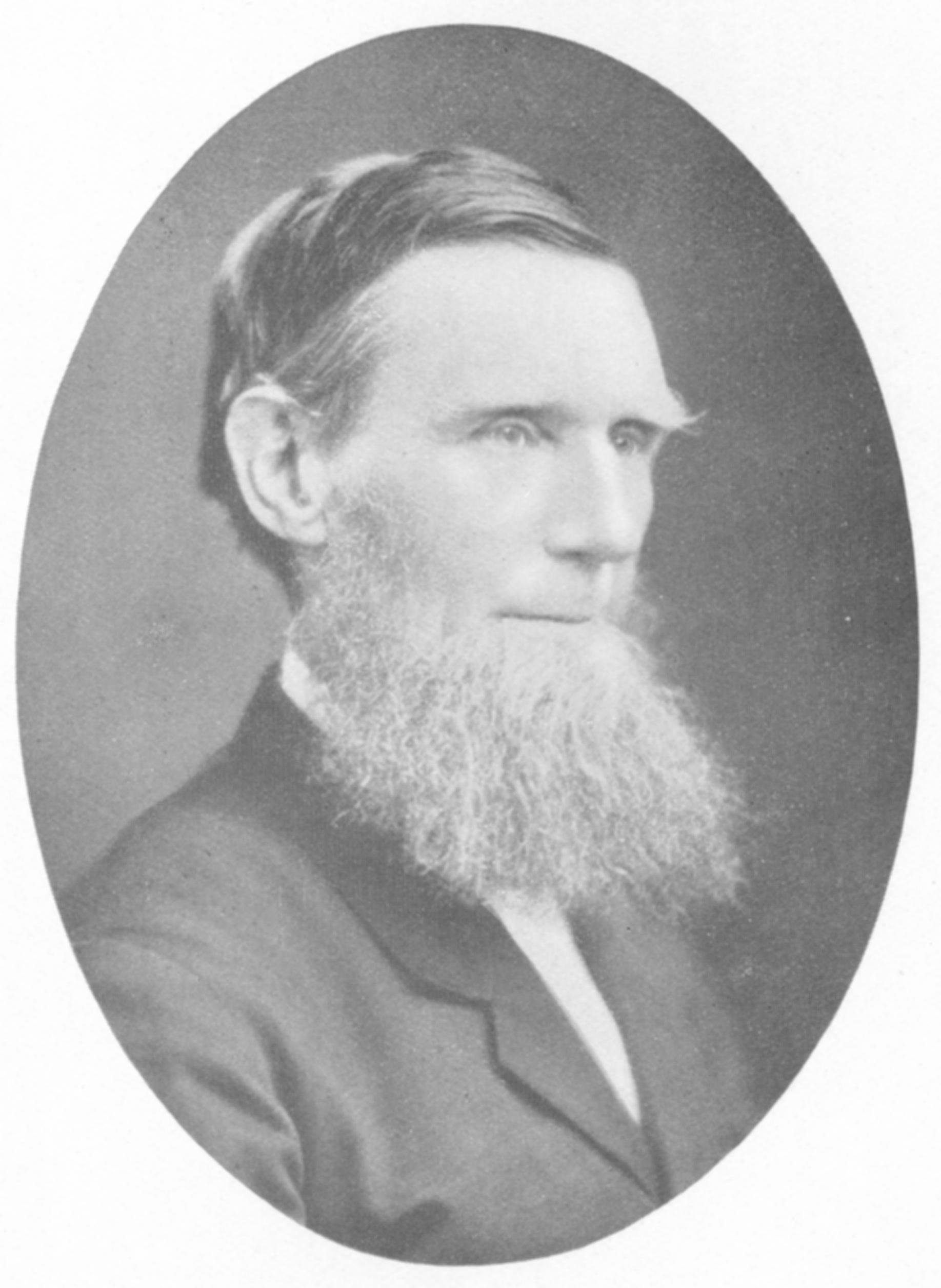
Joseph Horner Fletcher, from the Newington College Archives

Joseph Horner Fletcher (1 October 1823 – 30 June 1890) was a West Indies-born Methodist minister of English descent and was the founding Principal of Wesley College, Auckland and the second President of Newington College, Sydney. He was elected as first president of the NSW and Qld Wesleyan Methodist Conference and later as president of the General Conference of Australasia.

== Early life ==
Fletcher was born in St Vincent, Windward Islands, and was the eldest son of a Wesleyan missionary. His mother was Mary Horner, daughter of another Wesleyan Minister. From 1830 until 1837 he attended first of all Kingswood School, England, and then a school in Bath kept by his uncle, W. G. Horner, a former headmaster of Kingswood School. In 1842 he started a business before becoming a local preacher. He trained at Richmond College, Surrey, and in 1845 was ordained into the Wesleyan ministry. Three years later he married Kate Green.

== Ministry ==
Fletcher was posted to Auckland, New Zealand, and was the founding principal of Wesley College. Due to poor health he was forced to retire from Wesley and undertake circuit work. He was in Auckland and New Plymouth during the New Zealand Wars. In 1861, he moved to Brisbane and in 1863 was appointed the first chairman of the Queensland Wesleyan District. In 1865 Fletcher succeeded John Manton as President of Newington College, Sydney. He saw Newington as providing a secular education with a Christian ethos and hoped to overcome sectarianism through education. Newington students were examined by outside academics at his instigation. Fletcher was a strong supporter of the education policies of Henry Parkes and opposed corporal punishment in schools. Under Fletcher Newington moved from Silverwater to the present campus at Stanmore. His work led to the creation of the Central Methodist Mission in Sydney. Fletcher was elected as the first president of the New South Wales and Queensland Wesleyan Methodist Conference in 1874 and again in 1884, when he was also president of the General Conference of the Australasian Wesleyan Methodist Church.

== Sons ==
In 1892 Fletcher's eldest son, Joseph James Fletcher, edited a memorial edition of his Sermons, Addresses & Essays. His second son was William Horner Fletcher and his youngest child was Norman Vyner Fletcher.

Preceded by Rev John Manton	President; Newington College; 1865-1887	Succeeded by Rev Dr William Kelynack
