= Newington House =

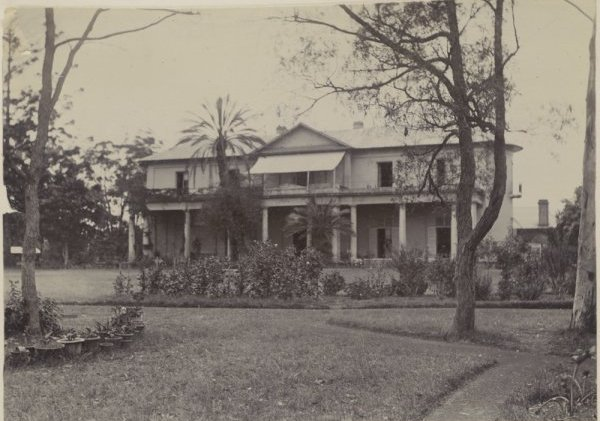
- Newington House, c. 1894

- Location within Sydney

General information
- Type: House
- Architectural style: Regency villa
- Location: Silverwater, New South Wales, Australia
- Coordinates: 33°49′44″S 151°03′25″E
- Construction started: 1829
- Completed: 1832
- Owner: Built by John Blaxland; Owned since 1879 by the New South Wales Government

Technical details
- Structural system: Stone and cement rendered brick

Design and construction
- Architects: John Verge (attrib. 1829–1832); Henry Cooper (attrib. 1829–1832); James Houison (1838–); Walter Liberty Vernon

New South Wales Heritage Register
- Official name: Silverwater Correctional Complex - Newington House & Grounds
- Type: Built
- Designated: n.d.
- Part of: Silverwater Correctional Centre
- Reference no.: Heritage Act – s.170 NSW State agency heritage register
- Group/collection: Law Enforcement
- Category: Prison

Register of the National Estate
- Official name: Newington, Holker St, Silverwater, NSW, Australia
- Type: Historic
- Criteria: Defunct register
- Designated: 21 March 1978
- Part of: Silverwater Correctional Centre
- Reference no.: 2958

Register of the National Estate
- Official name: Newington Chapel, Holker St, Silverwater, NSW, Australia
- Type: Historic
- Criteria: Defunct register
- Designated: 21 March 1978
- Part of: Silverwater Correctional Centre
- Reference no.: 2959

Newington House is a historic house in Silverwater, New South Wales, Australia and is located 20 kilometres (12 mi) west of the Sydney central business district, in the local government area of the City of Parramatta. The house and chapel are situated on the southern bank of the Parramatta River and are now enclosed by the Silverwater Correctional Centre. With Elizabeth Bay House and Camden Park, it is considered to be one of the three great houses of the County of Cumberland.

Newington is a substantial and intact example of a rural colonial villa, and demonstrates the quality of life of prominent citizens and families from early settlements. It is associated with a notable New South Wales family, being built for John Blaxland, whose entrepreneurial business activities were among the oldest in the colony, and whose brother, Gregory Blaxland, assisted in activities generally relative to the site. Its use since the occupation of the Blaxland family has reflected a number of social changes as the founding site of Newington College, and as an asylum, hospital, and prison administration building.

== The estate ==
The Newington estate was established on Aboriginal lands of the Wann-gal which encompassed the southern side of the Parramatta River from Cockle Bay to Rose Hill.

In the first 40 years of European settlement, grants of land in this area, ranging from 40 to 4,047 hectares (100 to 10,000 acres), were made to settlers. These land grants were inked in on County of Cumberland maps, with names of owners and land granted clearly indicated. In 1807, John Blaxland acquired 520 hectares (1,300 acres) of land, reserving the original grants of Waterhouse, Shortland, Archer and Haslam. He named the estate Newington after his family estate in Kent, England. Blaxland established a series of salt pans on the banks of the Parramatta River and by 1827 was producing 8 tons of salt each week for the Sydney market. Blaxland also established a tweed mill, lime kiln and flour mill. In 1843, Blaxland mortgaged the property to the Australian Trust Company. After he died in 1851 the Trust Company sold the property to John Dobie to recover the mortgage. The Blaxland family re-purchased the estate from Dobie in 1854 but offered it as security against a large loan. The property was transferred to the Official Assignee of the Insolvent Estate of Edward James Blaxland in 1860 and subsequently leased to the Methodist Church, who established Newington College on the estate. The College remained on the site until 1880.

The property, extending from near the current Holker Street to the current Carnarvon Street, was sold to John Wetherill in 1877. The following year, John Wetherill registered a subdivision plan for the entire 520 hectare Newington Estate. This proposal comprised an extensive grid layout, of some 114 lots, which extended well into the mud flats and mangroves of Wentworth Bay and Homebush Bay. In 1906 and 1909, Wetherill further subdivided his property as Riverside Heights, with the first allotments sold in that year. It was hoped that the location of the subdivision in proximity to the developing State Abattoir and Brickworks would attract people to the area in association with the employment opportunities offered by these establishments. This venture was largely unsuccessful, with only a few lots being sold. However the layout of the western part of the Newington subdivision remains obvious in the current street pattern and street names.

Newington was first offered to the Government for use as an Asylum for the Insane in 1874. The Government did not accept this offer, however in 1879, Government Architect James Barnett prepared a report on the suitability of the Newington estate for a Reformatory School for Boys. His report concluded that the site was suitable for a Boys Reformatory or a Benevolent Asylum for Aged Women. In September 1897 the Crown Solicitor confirmed that 5000 pounds would be paid to John Wetherill to acquire about 19 hectares of land, which included Newington House.

A new Aged Women's Asylum was constructed to replace the existing asylum which was housed within the Immigrant Depot at the Hyde Park Barracks. The first buildings were established in 1886 on this new site to house 300 patients. At this time, the hospital was categorised as a state asylum for dependent adults' with infirmity or illness of 'incurable character'. Various additional buildings and structures were added to the Newington Hospital over the years. In 1960 it was proposed that the hospital should be closed and the site sold to industry. The significance of the site, however, stimulated significant public opposition to the plans. In 1968, after a series of drawn out negotiations, the Government of the day decided to close the hospital and transfer the property to the then NSW Department of Prisons.

== The house ==
Newington House is a two-storey Regency villa, built between 1829 and 1832, in the style of an English mansion, with disciplined English gardens. In its heyday the Blaxland Estate was famous for its landscaped gardens and orchards. The house today is located in the centre of the Silverwater Corrective Centre. The main front of the house is symmetrical, with a central pedimented break-front. The main entrance door is surmounted by a decorative fanlight. The design has been variously attributed to John Verge and Henry Cooper however no original drawings have been located. Newington House was one of the subjects of architect and writer William Hardy Wilson's romanticised drawings of colonial architecture in NSW published in the 1920s. The house is now used as an administration block of the Silverwater Corrective Centre. The house is unusual in architectural terms, for its character rather than its quality; externally it forms a typical Regency structure, its initial conception somewhat marred by the awkward later placement of the verandah, which however presents a fine portal to the house. Internally the main items of significance are the room layout and the rigorous but rustic character of its joinery, where aspirations to the manner and style of a Verge house are seen in primitive form, revealing more general standards of workmanship of the day, and thus the joinery is idiosyncratic in detail rather than of refined quality.

== The chapel ==
The Blaxland family chapel, named St Augustine's, was built in 1838 and a marble plaque, above the main door, attests to this fact. It is a rendered, single storey building of brick with corner buttresses and is rectangular in plan. In design it is Gothicised Georgian with pilasters, a string course and a pedimented gable. The pointed arch fenestration with simple tracery, coloured glass and quatrefoil vents are Gothic Revival in style. St Augustine's demonstrates the strong religious convictions of the Blaxland family.

== The garden ==
Elements of the former house garden, and estate landscaping remain today. These include the outline of the formal carriage loop north of the house, isolated elements such as mature trees and an avenue of rainforest tree species and palms going north from the house towards the river. More detailed elements such as a pedestal and urn, east of the house on the edge of the former carriage loop also remain. Tree plantings lining the former carriage loop north of the house include Canary Island date palms (Phoenix canariensis), southern nettle trees (Celtis australis) and cotton palms (Washingtonia robusta) with their tall, clean trunks to 20m high. An avenue of trees towards the river comprises bunya-bunya pines (Araucaria bidwillii), hoop pines (Araucaria cunninghamii), Moreton Bay figs (Ficus macrophylla), Canary Island date palms and swamp mahoganies (Eucalyptus robusta). The latter of these may be later plantings. Walkway planting dates to the 1860s–1900, the main period of popularisation and fashionability of these species, and their promotion by such public figures as then Directors of the Royal Botanic Gardens, Sydney, Charles Moore and Joseph Maiden. These men provided such species to many public institutions such as hospitals. Cotton and Canary Island date palms were also commonly promoted species in this period. Close to Holker Street and the main entry are large specimens of Hill's fig (Ficus hillii) and Moreton Bay figs, transplanted from estate remnants to the east of the current entry driveway as part of a redevelopment of the main entry. These trees are at least of 1880s vintage but possibly older. Significance trees throughout the site include the extremely rare Schotia afra (Kaffir bean, Boer bean) and the surviving turpentines (Syncarpia glomulifera) which are likely to be indigenous to the site.

== Newington College ==
At the Methodist Conference of 1862, the Rev John Manton proposed that a collegiate institute, "decidedly Wesleyan in character", be founded in Sydney. It was expected that the school would "be open to the sons of parents of all religious denominations", and on Thursday 16 July 1863, the Wesleyan Collegiate Institute opened with 16 boys and a small number of theological students. As no suitable buildings were available in Sydney at the time, Newington House was leased. Newington College, as the school soon became known, prospered during its time on the Parramatta River and in 1869 was the first Australian school to play rugby football (against the University of Sydney), and soon after was the first school in Australia to hold an athletics carnival. The Newington College Cadet Unit is one of the oldest corps in the Australian Army Cadets. Expanding student numbers meant that more extensive premises closer to the city were required. A bequest, by John Jones, of land at Stanmore, saw the College move to the newly fashionable inner-city suburbs in 1880. By resolution of the College Council, the name Newington College was perpetuated on the new site, and Newington has remained at Stanmore ever since.

== Newington, suburb ==
Newington, New South Wales is a suburb built partially on the former Newington House estate. It is located on the western side of Homebush Bay, on the Parramatta River and 1 km (1 mi) north-west of Sydney Olympic Park and is best known as the location of the Athletes Village for the Sydney 2000 Olympics and 2000 Summer Paralympics. The Athlete's Village was converted to residential apartments after the Games. Other apartments and double-storey houses have also been built since.

== Newington Armory ==
Newington Armory was a Royal Australian Navy (RAN) ammunitions depot built on the former estate of Newington House. A powder magazine and camp and were built in 1897 by the Royal Marines as an ammunition depot for admiralty ships. After the passing of the Naval Defence Act in 1910, by the Commonwealth that formally established the Commonwealth Naval Forces, the Commonwealth took over the ammunition depot and expanded the facilities. It became known as the Royal Australian Naval Armament Depot (RANAD). The RAN started to vacate the site in 1996, with ownership transferred to the Government of New South Wales to be developed as the Sydney 2000 Olympics Athlete's Village and the suburb of Newington.

== Gallery ==
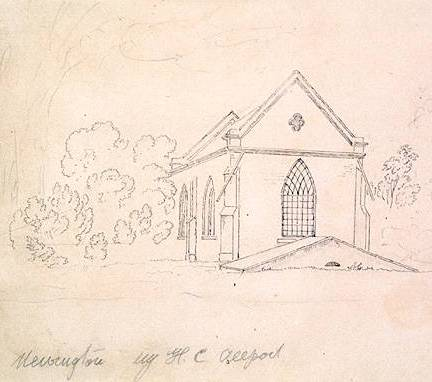
Newington House Chapel, undated drawing

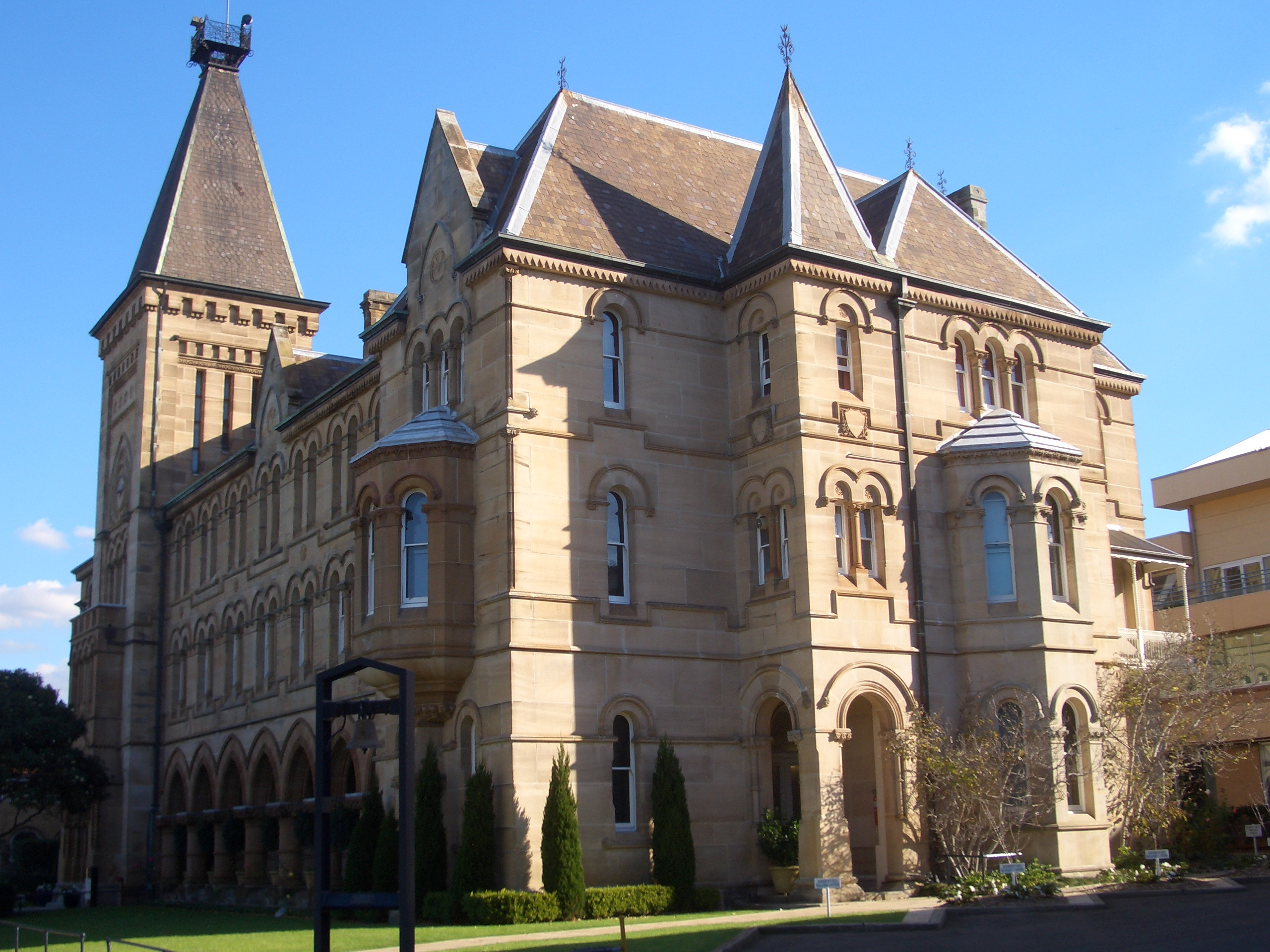
Newington College, Stanmore

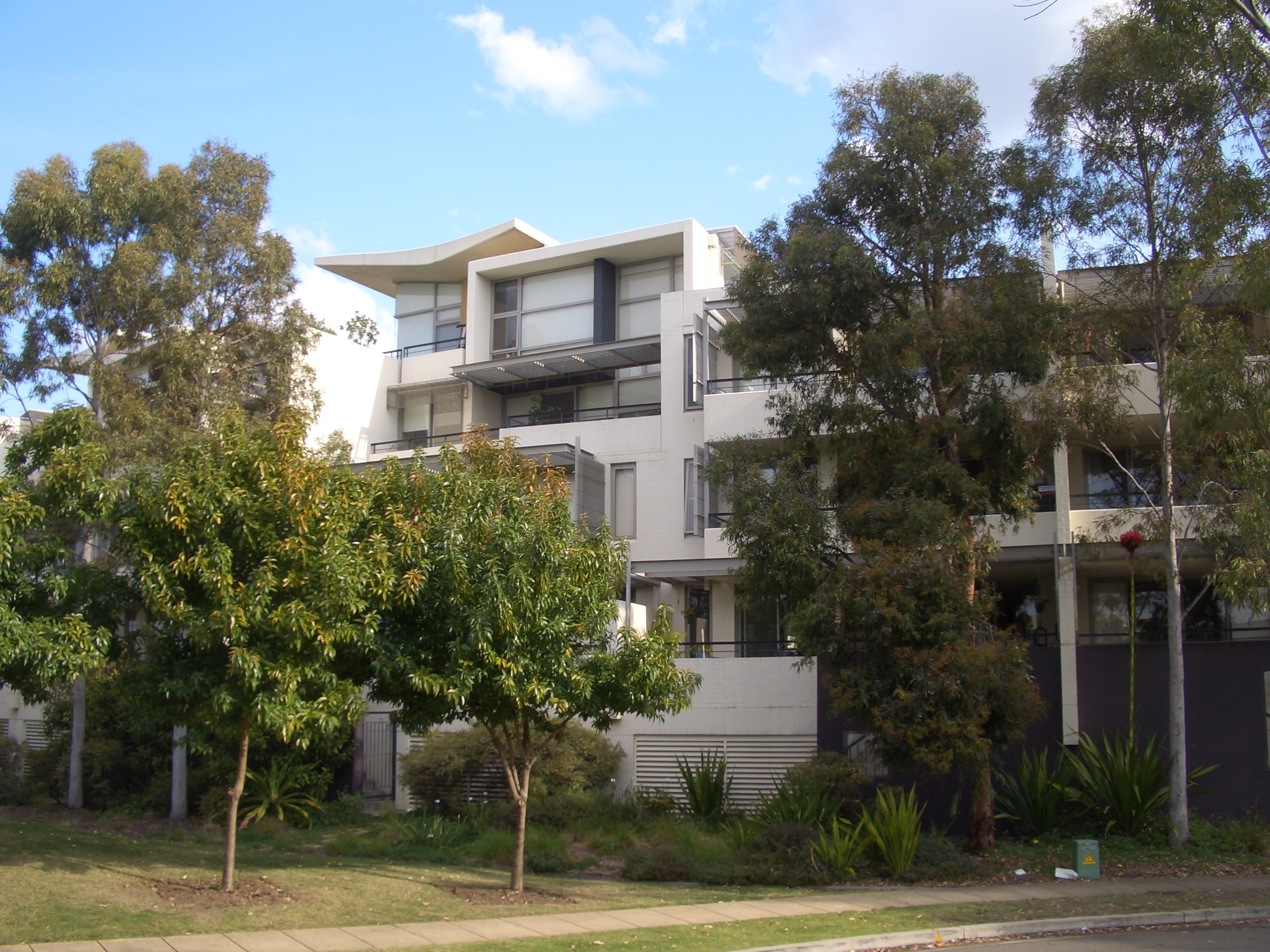
The suburb of Newington

== See also ==
- Silverwater Correctional Complex
- Silverwater Prison Complex Conservation Area
