= John Manton =

Australian college administrator (1807–1864)

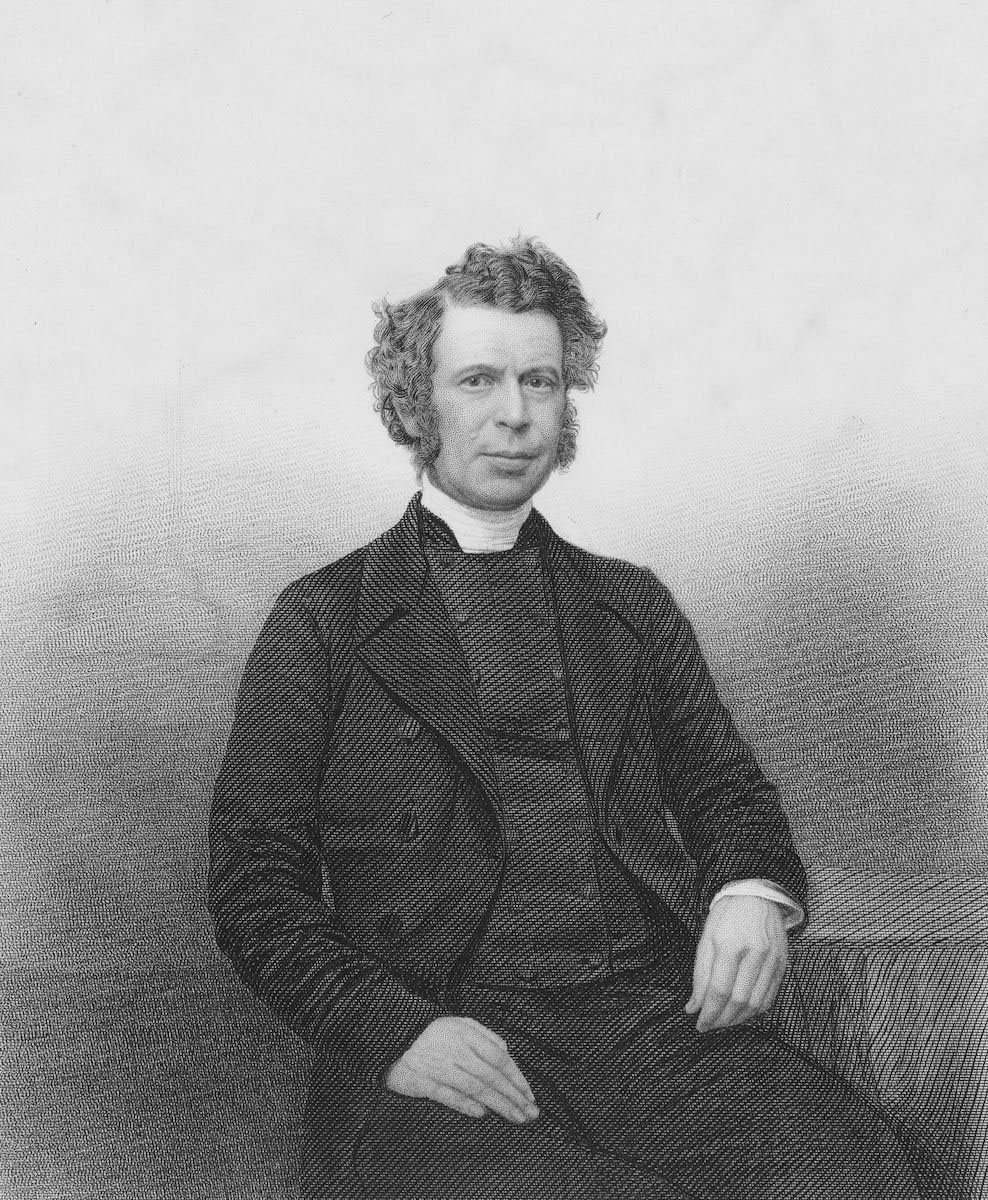
Rev JA Manton - National Portrait Gallery from the Newington College Archives

John Allen Manton (17 August 1807 – 9 September 1864) was an English-born Australian Methodist minister, school principal and founding President of Newington College, Sydney.

== Early life ==
Manton was born in Biggleswade, Bedfordshire, England. As a teenager he became aware of his vocation and after a trial with the Methodist Society he was made a local preacher before being ordained in 1830. The following year he left for missionary service in New South Wales.

== Australian ministry ==
On his arrival in Australia in 1831, Manton was appointed to Parramatta. He transferred six months later to a penal settlement at Macquarie Harbour, Van Diemen's Land and then to Port Arthur as chaplain. There, he also organized and conducted convict schools for adult convicts and convict boys. From 1834, Manton conducted a successful ministry in Launceston. After several short appointments he was reappointed to Port Arthur, remaining there until Wesleyan chaplains were withdrawn from service. He later served as superintendent minister in Hobart.

== Schoolmaster ==
In 1855 he opened Horton College, Campbell Town, Tasmania, as its first principal. He asked to be relieved of its oversight in 1857 and moved to New South Wales, where he proposed the establishment of a Wesleyan collegiate institution. In 1862 Newington House was leased and, with Manton as President, it was opened in July as Newington College. His health had never been robust and he died at the college in the following year, survived by his widow, Anne, and several children.

Preceded by Inaugural	President; Newington College; 1863-1864	Succeeded by Rev Joseph Horner Fletcher
