= Newington College =

College in Sydney, Australia

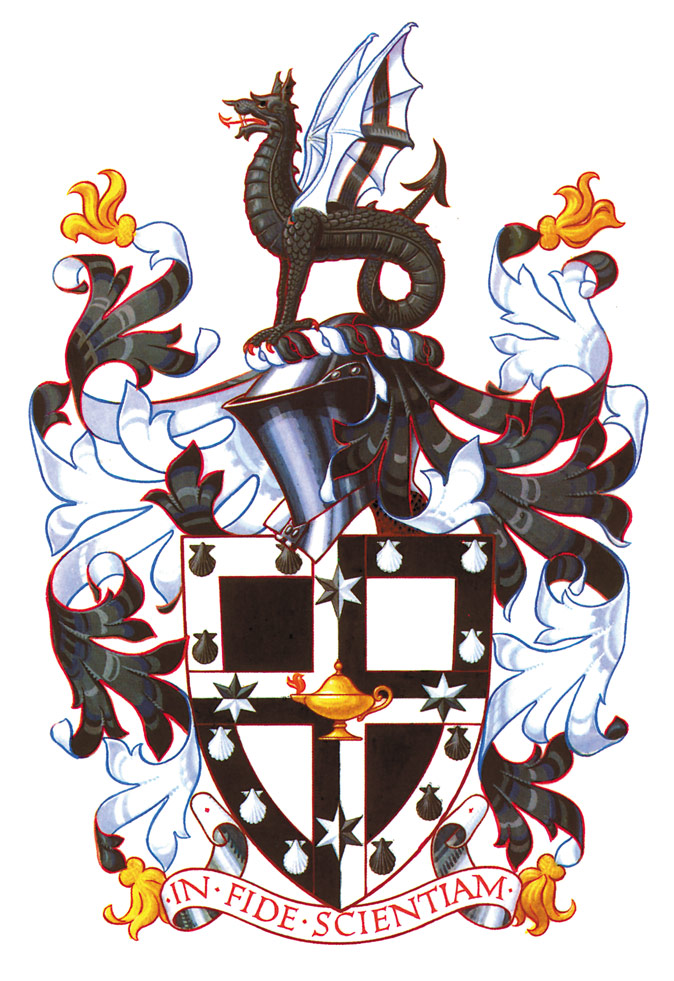

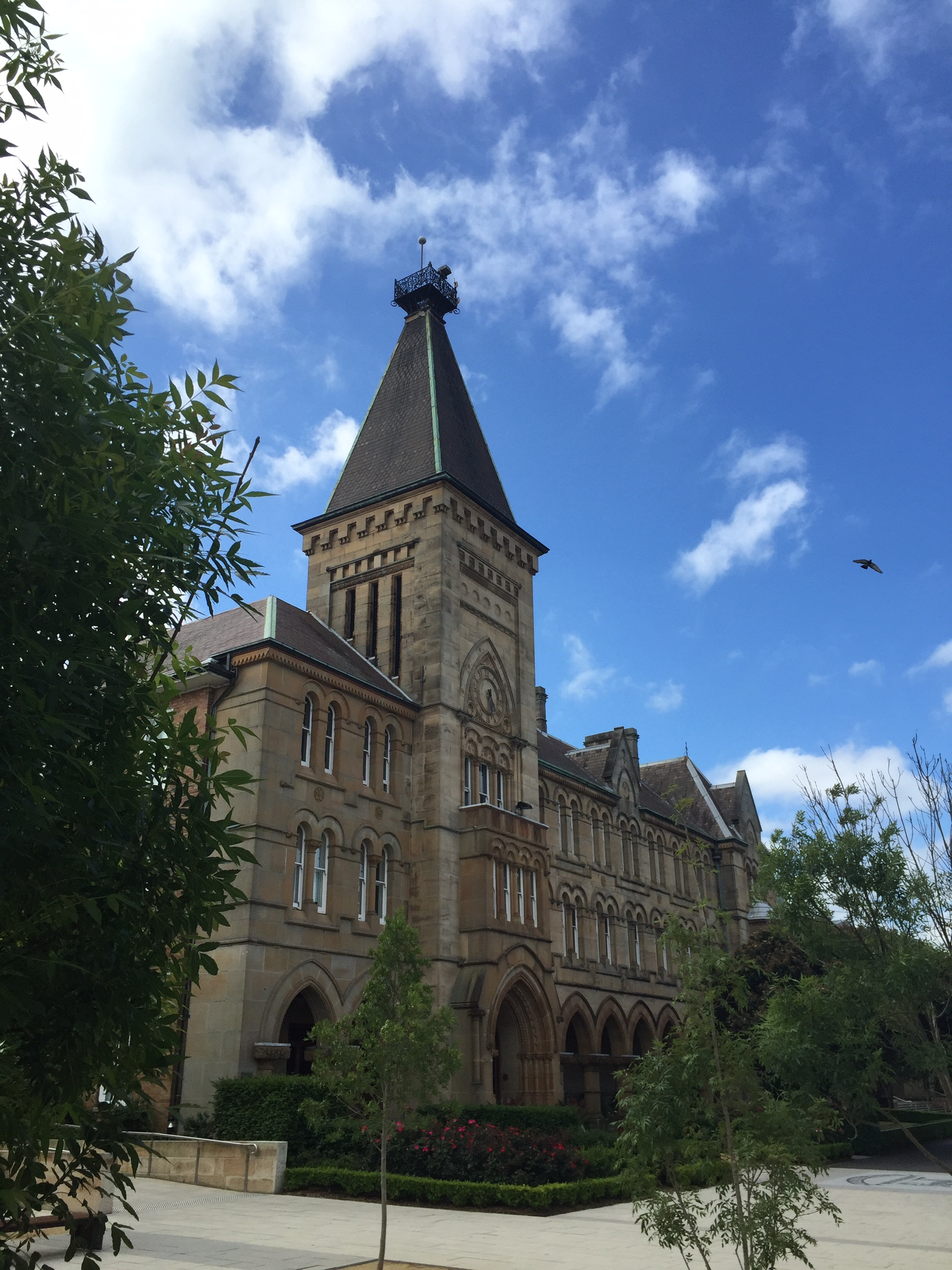
- Founders Building at Newington College

Location
- Inner West and Lower North Shore of Sydney; Australia; 33°53′55″S 151°09′44″E

Information
- Type: Independent; early learning, primary and secondary; day and boarding
- Motto: Latin: In Fide Scientiam (To Faith Add Knowledge)
- Religious affiliation: Uniting Church
- Denomination: Uniting Church
- Established: 1863; 163 years ago
- Sister school: MLC School
- Educational authority: New South Wales Education Standards Authority
- Chair: Rachel Stock
- Headmaster: Michael Parker
- Staff: 183
- Years: K–12
- Gender: Co-educational: Early learning; Co-educational: K–12
- Enrolment: 2,051 (2026)
- Campuses: Stanmore: 129 Cambridge Street (Early learning); 115 Cambridge Street: (K–6); 200 Stanmore Road: (7–12); Lindfield: (K–6); Abbotsford: (Boat shed)
- Campus type: Suburban
- Colours: Black and white
- Slogan: Discover what's possible
- Athletics: Athletic Association of the Great Public Schools of New South Wales
- Publication: The Newingtonian "The NC"
- Affiliations: Association of Heads of Independent Schools of Australia; Independent Primary School Heads of Australia; Junior School Heads Association of Australia; Australian Boarding Schools' Association
- Alumni: Old Newingtonians
- Website: www.newington.nsw.edu.au

Newington College is a multi-campus independent Uniting Church co-educational early learning, primary and secondary day and boarding school, primarily located in Stanmore, an Inner West suburb of Sydney, Australia. Established in 1863 at Newington House, Silverwater, the College celebrated its sesquicentenary in 2013. The college is open to children of all faiths and denominations. Newington has been governed by an Act of Parliament since 1922.

Newington has two preparatory schools for girls and boys: Wyvern House in Cambridge Street, Stanmore, and Lindfield on Sydney's Upper North Shore. Plus a senior campus and Early Learning Centre for girls and boys aged 3-5 in Stanmore.The College also has a campus on the Mid North Coast at Eungai Creek, where Newington's social service immersion program takes place. Newington currently caters for about 2000 students from their ELC to Year 12. Edmund Webb House, a boarding facility, is in Cambridge Street, Stanmore and is home to 50 boys. The Robert Glasson Memorial Boat Shed is on the Parramatta River at Abbotsford and also contains a boarding facility for thirty boys.

As of July 2026, Newington has 16 houses, expanded from eight houses in 2022 to strengthen the pastoral care system. The College is a member of the Association of Heads of Independent Schools of Australia (AHISA), the Junior School Heads Association of Australia (JSHAA), the Australian Boarding Schools' Association, and is a founding member of the Athletic Association of the Great Public Schools of New South Wales (AAGPS).

The College prepares students for the International Baccalaureate Diploma Programme, the Vocational Education and Training pathway, Cambridge IGSCE and the NSW Higher School Certificate.

In 2026, Newington became co-educational with the admittance of girls into Year 5 and Kindergaren at the Prep school in Stanmore and Year 5 at the Prep school in Lindfield. Female students will join in Year 7 and 11 in 2028, with the intention of becoming fully co-ed by 2031.

== History ==
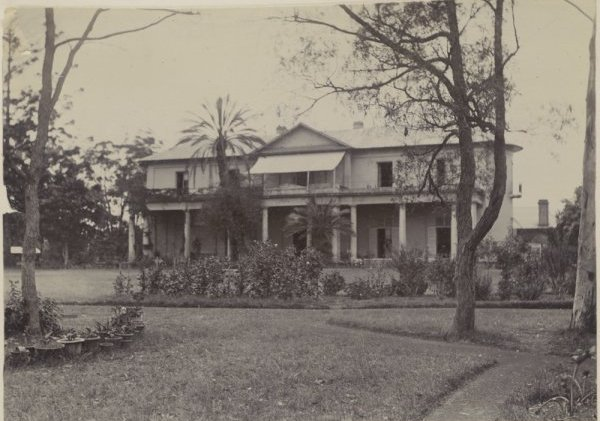
Newington House, Silverwater

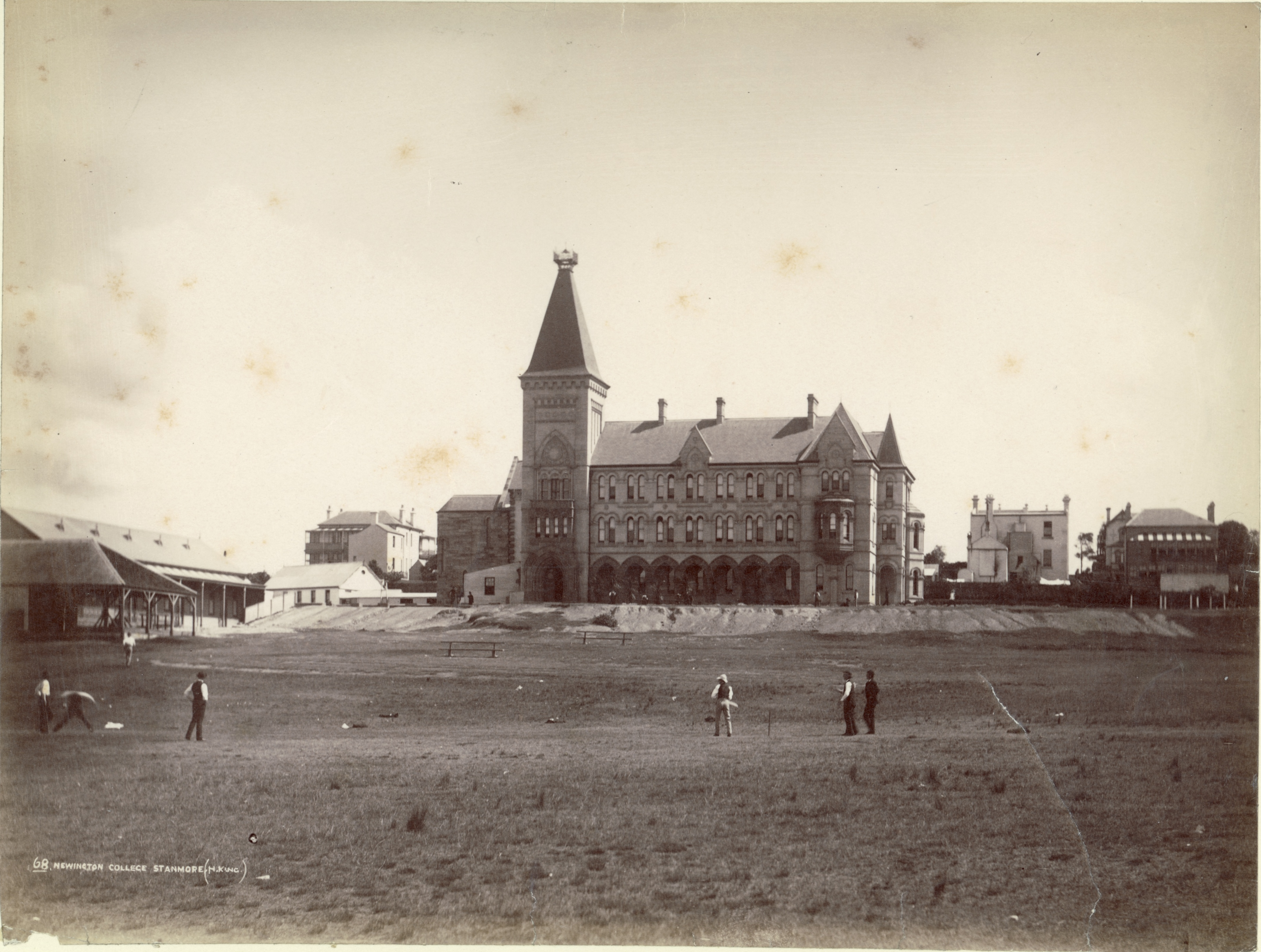
Founders Building, incomplete in the 1890s

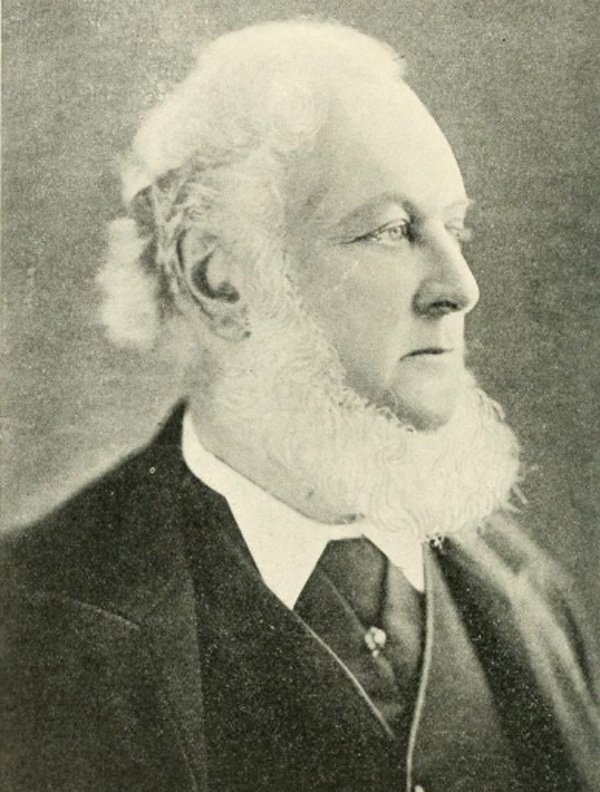
Sir George Wigram Allan

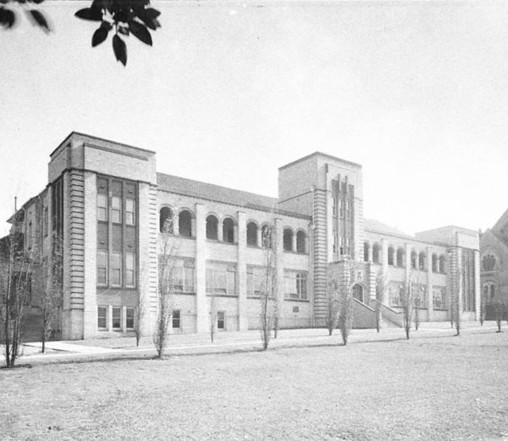
The Le Couteur Wing, built as Wyvern House in the 1930s

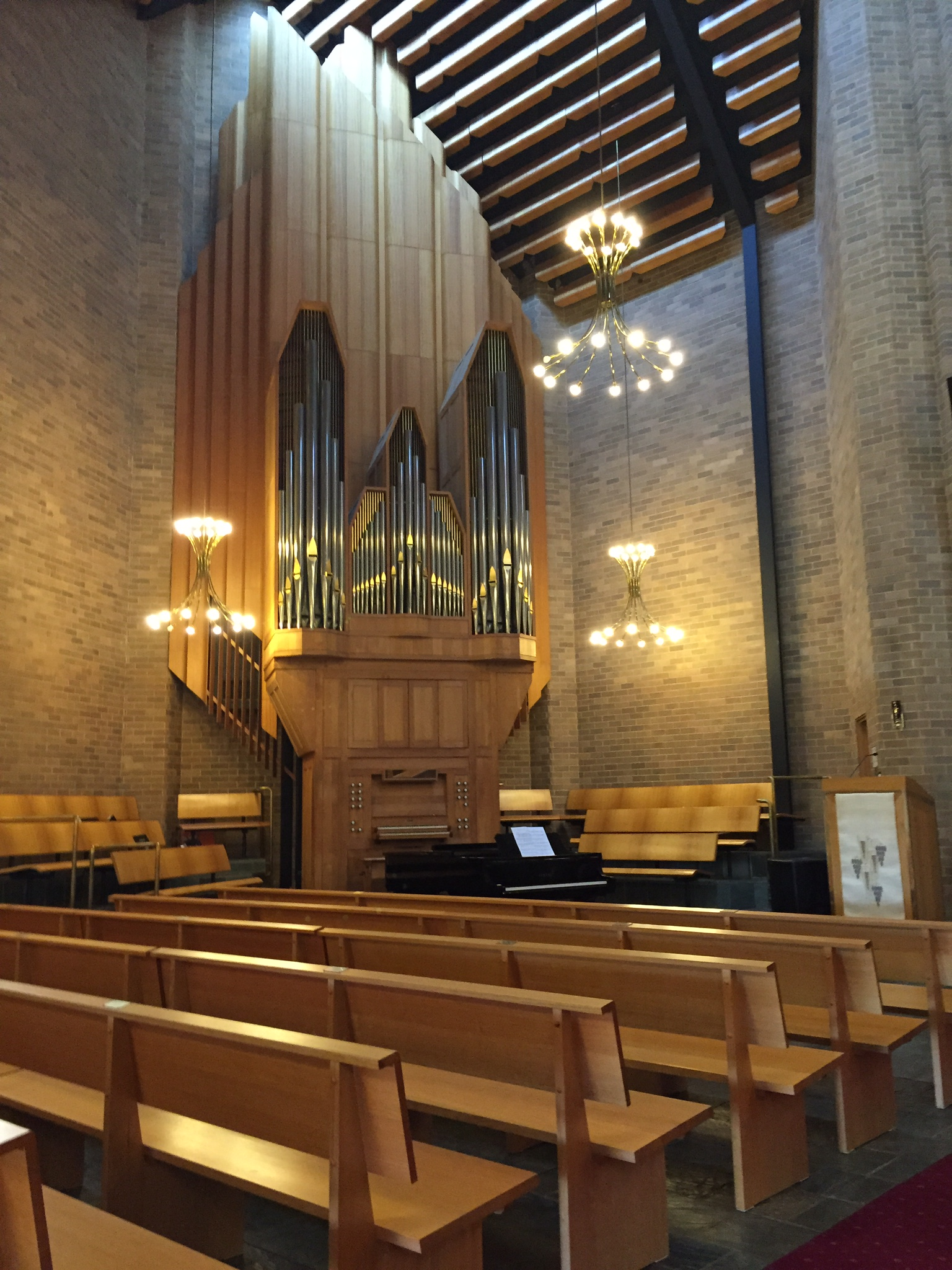
The College Chapel was built in 1984

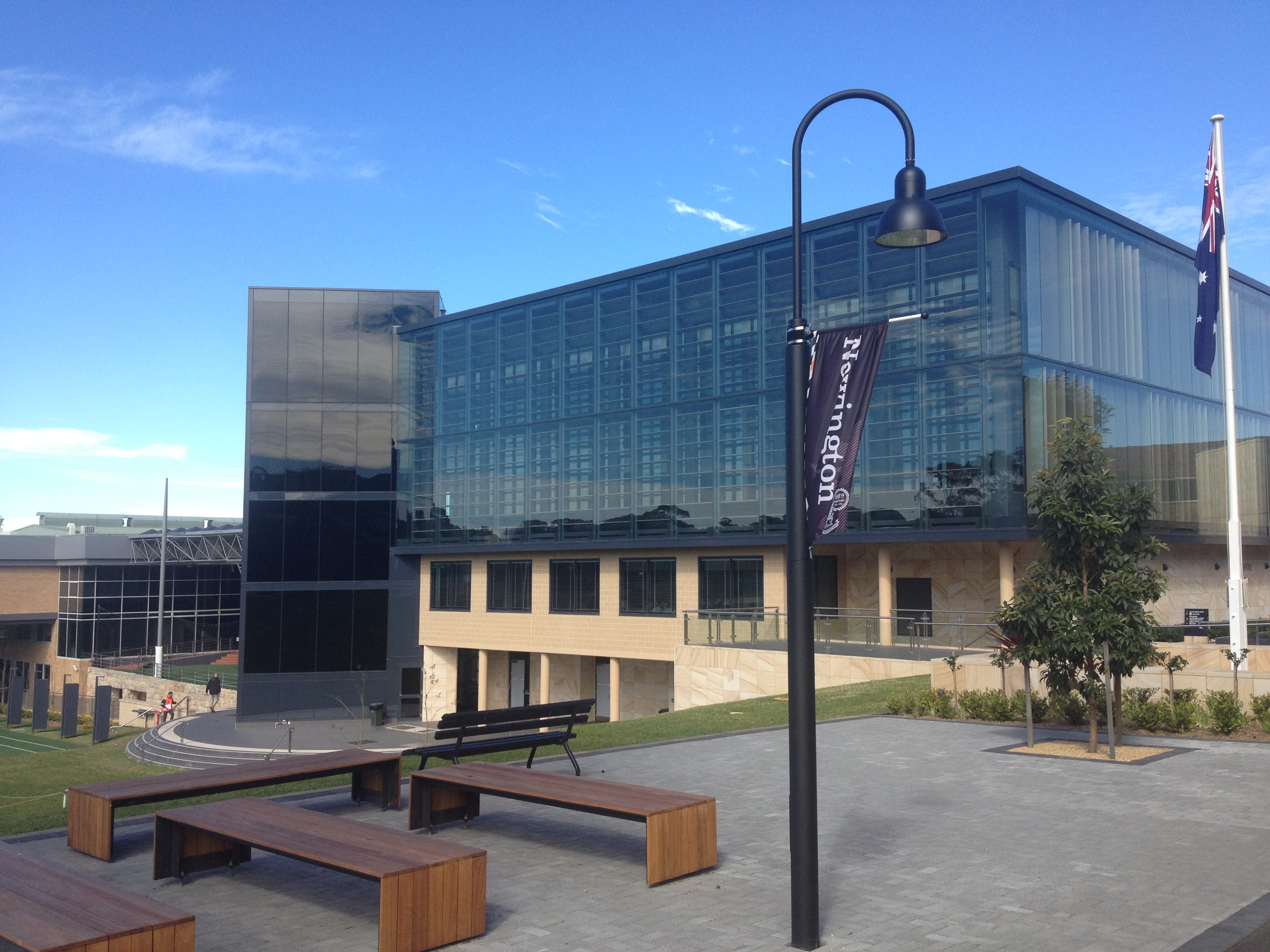
The Taylor Sports Centre and Rae Centre

=== Early history ===
The Reverend John Manton proposed that a collegiate institute, "decidedly Wesleyan in character" be founded in Sydney with a liberal enrolment policy of accepting children from ‘all religious denominations.’ On 16 July 1863, the Wesleyan Collegiate Institution opened with 16 pupils, with two theological students entering the following week.

Newington College, as the school soon became known, prospered during its time on the Parramatta River and in 1869 was the first Australian school to play rugby (against the University of Sydney), and soon after was the first school in Australia to hold an athletics carnival. In 1869, the Newington College Cadet Corps was formally incorporated by the Governor of New South Wales, Somerset Lowry-Corry, 4th Earl Belmore. It is one of the oldest continuous corps in the Australian Army Cadets.

Expanding student numbers meant that more extensive premises closer to the city were required. A bequest by John Jones of land at Stanmore saw the College move to the newly fashionable inner-city suburb. A grand stone edifice was designed by Thomas Rowe and was described by Morton Herman, an architectural historian, as 'an almost perfect example of scholastic Gothic Revival architecture'. The Thomas Rowe-designed Founder's Building, including its interior and surrounding grounds, are listed on the heritage register of the former Marrickville Council. Thomas Wran completed substantial architectural sculpture commissions on the capitals of the stone colonnade of the building. Earth-moving work began on the site in 1876 and by May 1878 the building had reached first floor height. A public ceremony was held and six commemorative stones were laid. Among the six given the honour of laying the stones were Sir George Wigram Allen KCMG, the philanthropist who was Speaker of the New South Wales Legislative Assembly. He had lent A£12,000 for the new buildings at Stanmore and later endowed the Wigram Allen Scholarship for boys proceeding to matriculation. The formal opening of the new school building was by Sir George on 18 January 1881. By resolution of the College Council, the name Newington College was perpetuated on the new site. Seventy school and theological students migrated from Silverwater to Stanmore.

Other local government heritage listings across the Newington campuses include the former Stanmore Methodist Church, also designed by Rowe in 1874 and now part of the Duckmanton Drama Centre, the Victorian Italianate-style parsonage that is now the Critical Thinking Centre; and at Abbotsford, the late 20th Century Robert Glasson Boatshed that replaced the 1920s original. A gymnasium was built in 1890, and a swimming pool was opened in 1894 however both have been replaced by a multi-court gymnasium and indoor swimming pool.

=== 20th Century ===
Newington ceased its connection to theological training in 1914, when the Wesleyan Theological Institution moved to the newly founded Leigh College at Strathfield South. In 1921, a stone war memorial, designed by Old Newingtonian William Hardy Wilson (ON 1898), was opened in memory of those old boys who had paid the supreme sacrifice in World War I. A separate preparatory school was opened in 1921, after a bequest by Sir Samuel McCaughey. It became known as Wyvern House in 1938, when a new building was opened by Old Newingtonian Sir Percival Halse Rogers (ON 1901).

The Stanmore Road boundary of the school is distinguished by a rusticated stone and wrought iron fence and two sets of entrance gates that were designed by Old Newingtonian military engineer and architect Colonel Alfred Warden (ON 1887). In 1936, the Millner gates were opened after a benefaction by Colonel Thomas Millner MC VD (ON 1903) in memory of his father. In 1938, the second set of gates were opened and named in honour of Frank Edwin Dixon who left £200 to the school in 1929.

In 1925 a rowing facility was built at Abbotsford, and in 1957 another preparatory school was founded on the North Shore – first at Killara, and subsequently relocated to Lindfield. Since World War II, the College buildings and facilities expanded significantly under the ONU Honorary Architects Panel and the convenorship of Hedley Norman Carr (ON 1922).

During the headmastership of Tony Rae, the Senior Block (1972), Resources Centre Library (1975), and Chapel (1984) were opened. A new Physical Education Centre (1993) was opened by Old Newingtonian Nick Farr-Jones AM, and a new boatshed at Abbotsford (1995) were two of the most important property additions. In 1998, while Michael Smee was Headmaster, Wyvern House moved to a separate campus in Cambridge Street, Stanmore. The former Wyvern House building was then renovated and renamed the Le Couteur Wing in memory of former Headmaster Philip Le Couteur.

=== 21st Century ===
In 2007, Newington acquired the Concordia Club (the former German cultural club) on Stanmore Road for A$3.51 million. As of 2014, Le Couteur was re-renovated and visual arts classes began to occupy the first floor with languages and learning enhancement classes held on level two.

During 2006, the press reported on an industrial relations dispute at Newington in which then headmaster David Scott planned to force staff to re-apply for their jobs in a restructure that would also reduce their holidays. Scott said that 'The action was taken after a comprehensive review of the school and had nothing to do with the federal government's WorkChoices reforms'. The Sydney Morning Herald reported that Scott believed that the Independent Education Union was being mischievous 'at best', or using an 'outright and deliberate lie' in suggesting the restructure was linked to workplace legislation. Following a meeting between the Union and Newington College, Scott agreed to not declare senior staff positions vacant and the school continued to negotiate collective arrangements covering salary and working conditions for staff.

David Mulford was appointed Headmaster in 2009 and served in that role until retiring in 2018. The Nesbitt Wing (1961), named in honour of College chairman Robert H. Nesbitt (1951–64), was refurbished and extended in 2012 to encompass the Technology Centre. Between 2009 and 2012 Newington spent A$78 million on capital works; in 2012 A$33.7 million was outlaid on infrastructure alone. In 2013 the College celebrated its sesquicentenary with the opening of two new buildings honouring two former Headmasters – The Lawrence Pyke Science Centre and The Tony Rae Resources Centre Library. This development was awarded the Master Builders Association of New South Wales's Excellence in Construction Award and was funded by donations and parent fees. The facilities at the Stanmore campus cover over 1,200 square metres (13,000 sq ft) and contain a library, a 250-seat lecture theatre, the new boarders' dining room, a cafeteria, and science labs. In November 2013, the PE Centre was renamed the Taylor Sports Centre in honour of Old Newingtonian cricket and rugby union international Johnny Taylor (ON 1915). The naming was performed by Old Newingtonian Olympic rower and coach Michael Morgan OAM (ON 1964).

On 18 July 2016, in commemoration of the sesquicentenary of Newington College's brother school Tupou College, the reigning monarch of the Kingdom of Tonga King Tupou VI and his wife Queen Consort Nanasipau'u visited the College to open the Tupou College Centre. The centre houses specialist teaching spaces and a health centre.

The Duckmanton Drama Centre was named in honour of Sir Talbot Duckmanton (ON 1938) and opened on 31 July 2017. Sir Talbot served on the Newington College Council from 1964 until 1978 and chaired the Council Executive Committee for five years.

Newington officially opened the Eungai Creek service-learning campus on 22 November 2025, although the campus first welcomed students for the term stay program at the beginning of that year. The campus has been recognised with a number of design awards including the 2026 NSW Architecture Award for Sustainable Architecture, a Commendation for Educational Architecture, the LEAD Award for New Campus with Educational Facilities, and a Commendation for Innovative Education Initiative.

==== Co-education ====
On the 20 November 2023 it was officially announced that the College would be transitioning to co-education, with the College Council outlining a plan to begin introducing girls into Year 5 and Kindergardeten in 2026, Year 7 and 11 in 2028, with the intention of becoming fully co-ed by 2033.

In December 2024 a student at Newington College filed a lawsuit in the Supreme Court of NSW to challenge the College's decision to become co-educational. The plaintiff, known as "Student A" on an anonymisation order, stood against the Council of Newington College and 25 other defendants. The case rested on the definition of "youth" in the College's 1873 Trust Deed, with the plaintiff arguing that the term referred exclusively to boys and young men. In May 2025 the court ruled that "youth" applied to both male and female students as a gender-neutral term, allowing the transition to co-education to go ahead.

== College Council ==
The Newington College Council Act allows for the appointment of up to 24 members of the council: nine clerical appointments; nine lay appointments; and six members nominated by the Old Newingtonians Union (ONU). In April 2026, the College appointed the first female chair, Rachel Stock.

=== Chair of the Council Executive Committee ===
Chair	Term begin	Term end	Education	Other positions held
Robert Nesbitt	1951	1964	Sydney Boys High School	Australian Trade Commissioner to New Zealand
Rev. Cecil Gribble OBE	1964	1965	Queen's College, Melbourne	President General; Methodist Church of Australasia
Doug Stewart	1965	1967	Newington 1910–19	Managing director McCarron Stewart
Sir Talbot Duckmanton OBE	1968	1973	Newington 1934–38	general manager Australian Broadcasting Commission
Austin Donlan	1973	1994		Accountant and Manager
Donald Dwyer	1994	2000	Newington 1939–49	Engineer; GHD Group
Richard Hansford	2000	2002	North Sydney Boys High School; Sydney Law School	Lawyer; McCoy, Grove & Atkinson
Peter Meares	2002	2007	Newington 1949–59; BA LLB; University of Sydney	Stockbroker; BZW Meares
Hon. Angus Talbot	2007	2013	Newington 1949–53; Sydney Law School	Judge Land and Environment Court of New South Wales
Tony McDonald	2014	2026	Newington 1971–76; BComm LLB University of New South Wales	Professional non-executive company director, previously a lawyer and founder of a listed financial services company
Rachel Stock	2026	Current	Bachelor of Commerce (Accounting) from the University of New South Wales (UNSW)	Spent more than 25 years at Macquarie Group in senior finance, risk and operations roles before joining Bank of Queensland as Chief Risk Officer in 2024.

== College staff ==
=== Presidents and headmasters ===
From its founding in 1863 until 1900, Newington had a system of dual control with a president (who was an ordained minister) and a headmaster. As an ordained minister, Charles Prescott assumed both roles on his appointment in 1900 and, on his retirement in 1931, the role of President was abolished.

==== Presidents ====
President	Term begin	Term end	Education	Other positions held	Notes
Rev. John Manton	1863	1864		Founding Principal, Horton College, Tasmania	
Rev. Joseph Horner Fletcher	1865	1887	Kingswood School	Founding Principal, Wesley College, Auckland	
Rev. Dr William Kelynack	1887	1891	Penzance	President, Australasian Wesleyan Methodist Church	
Rev. Dr James Egan Moulton	1891	1900	Kingswood School	Founding Headmaster, Tupou College, Tonga	(Note: Moulton served separate terms both as Headmaster (1863) and as President (1891–1900).)
Rev. Dr Charles John Prescott	1900	1931	Kingswood School; Worcester College, Oxford	Founding Headmaster, Wesleyan Ladies' College, Sydney	(Note: Prescott concurrently served as both President and Headmaster (1900–1931).)

==== Headmasters ====
Headmaster	Term begin	Term end	Education	Other positions held
Rev. James Egan Moulton	1863	1864	Kingswood School	Founding Headmaster; Tupou College
Thomas Johnston	1864	1866		
George Metcalfe	1867	1869	University of Melbourne; University of Sydney	Proprietor and Headmaster High School, Goulburn; Founding Headmaster Druitt Town Public School
Michael Howe	1869	1877	Trinity College, Dublin; University of Melbourne	Founding Headmaster Galt Grammar School; Headmaster Jarvis Collegiate Institute, Toronto
Joseph Coates	1877	1883	Huddersfield College	Founding Headmaster; Sydney Boys' High School
William Williams	1884	1892	Newark Grammar School; Trinity College, Cambridge	Professor of Classics & English Literature; University of Tasmania
Arthur Lucas	1893	1898	Kingswood School; Balliol College, Oxford	Headmaster Sydney Grammar School; Professor of Mathematics University of Tasmania
Edward William Cornwall	1899	1900	Keble College, Oxford	Acting Headmaster Ipswich Grammar School; Languages Lecturer University of Melbourne
Rev. Dr.Charles Prescott	1900	1931	Kingswood School; Worcester College, Oxford	Founding Headmaster; MLC School Sydney
Philip Le Couteur	1931	1948	Queen's College, Melbourne; University College, Oxford; University of Bonn, Germany	Headmaster Methodist Ladies' College, Melbourne; Headmaster Hale School, Perth
Mervyn Austin AM	1950	1951	Melbourne Grammar School; University of Melbourne; Christ Church, Oxford	Professor of Classics; University of Western Australia
Lawrence Pyke	1952	1960	Wesley College, Melbourne; University of Melbourne; University of Oxford	Dean of Graduate Studies; University of Melbourne
Ernest Duncan	1962	1963	University of Otago; Columbia University	Professor of Mathematics; Rutgers University
Rev. Douglas Trathen	1963	1970	Canterbury Boys' High School; University of Sydney	Headmaster; Wolaroi College, Orange
Tony Rae AM	1972	1993	The Scots College, Sydney; University of Sydney	Headmaster; Albury Grammar School
Michael Smee OAM	1993	2003	The King's School, Sydney; University of Sydney	Headmaster; Pulteney Grammar School, Adelaide
David Scott	2003	2009	University of Western Australia; Murdoch University; Edith Cowan University	Headmaster, Kingswood College, Melbourne; Headmaster Anglican Church Grammar School, Brisbane
Dr David Mulford	2009	2018	University of Canberra	Principal Radford College, Canberra; Headmaster Blue Mountains Grammar School
Michael Parker	2019	incumbent	James Ruse Agricultural High School; University of Sydney	Headmaster; Oxley College, Bowral; Deputy Headmaster; Cranbrook School, Sydney

=== Notable masters ===
The long service of masters at Newington College is recognised in a number of ways. In 1955 a marble commemorative plaque was set in the north-western wall of the Prescott Hall to commemorate the work of three very long serving staff members and their Head, with the inscription:

THIS STONE WAS SET IN PLACE IN RECOGNITION OF DEVOTED SERVICE
TO NEWINGTON COLLEGE BY A HEADMASTER AND HIS THREE SENIOR MASTERS

THEIR INFLUENCE ON THE BOYS IN THEIR CARE WAS A CHALLENGE AND AN INSPIRATION TO YOUNG LIVES

REV. DR. C.J.PRESCOTT M.A. (OXON.) D.D.
HEADMASTER OF THE COLLEGE
1900–1931

C.A.BUCHANAN B.A.
1889–1931

B.JARVIE B.A.
1898–1948

H.F.CORTIS JONES M.B.E. M.A.
1897–1952

ERECTED BY OLD BOYS IN THE DIAMOND JUBILEE YEAR OF
THE OLD NEWINGTONIANS' UNION IN GRATEFUL APPRECIATION OF ENDURING BENEFITS
17TH SEPTEMBER 1955

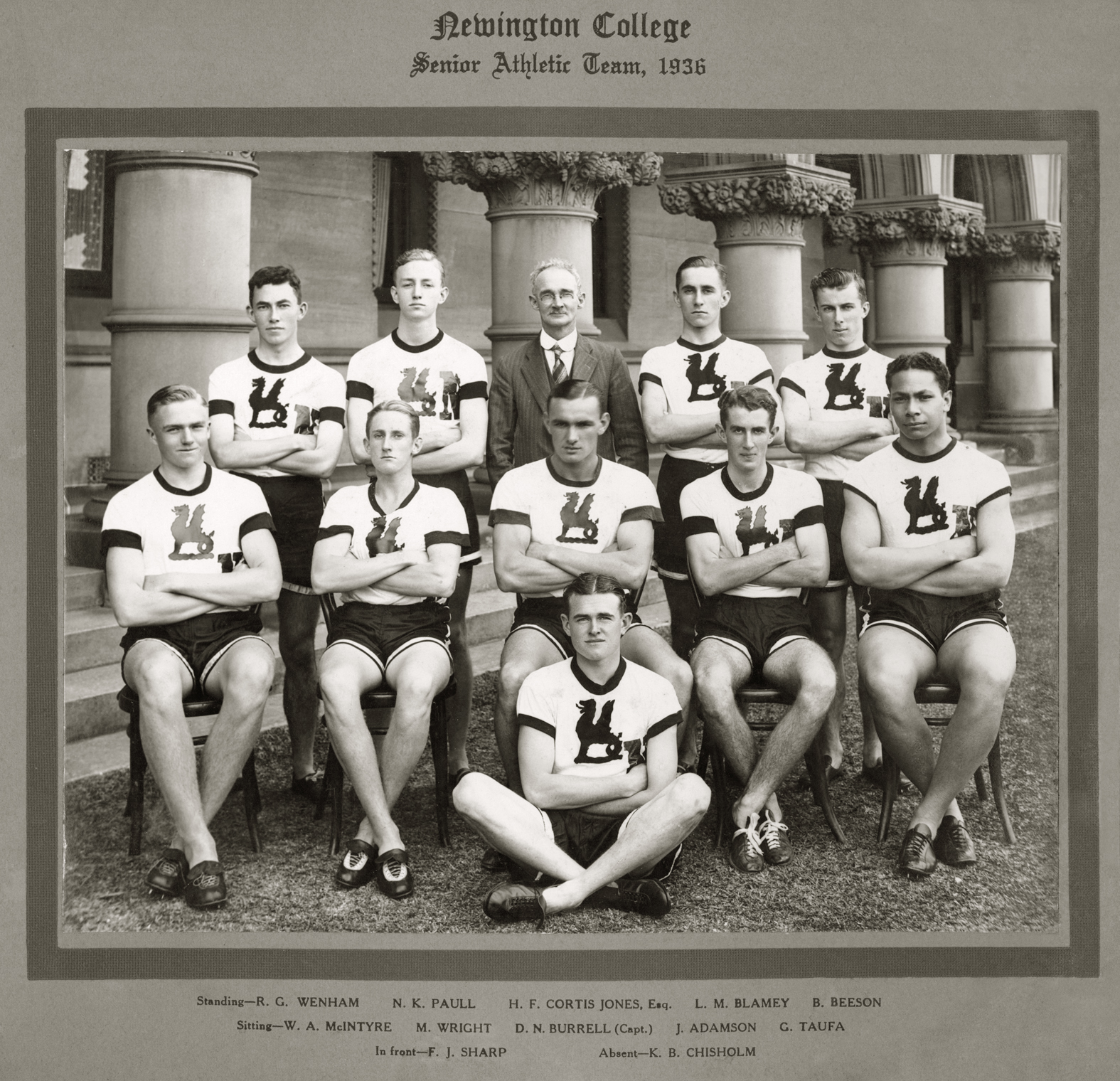
Newington College's longest serving master, Harry Cortis Jones, and the 1936 Senior Athletics Team

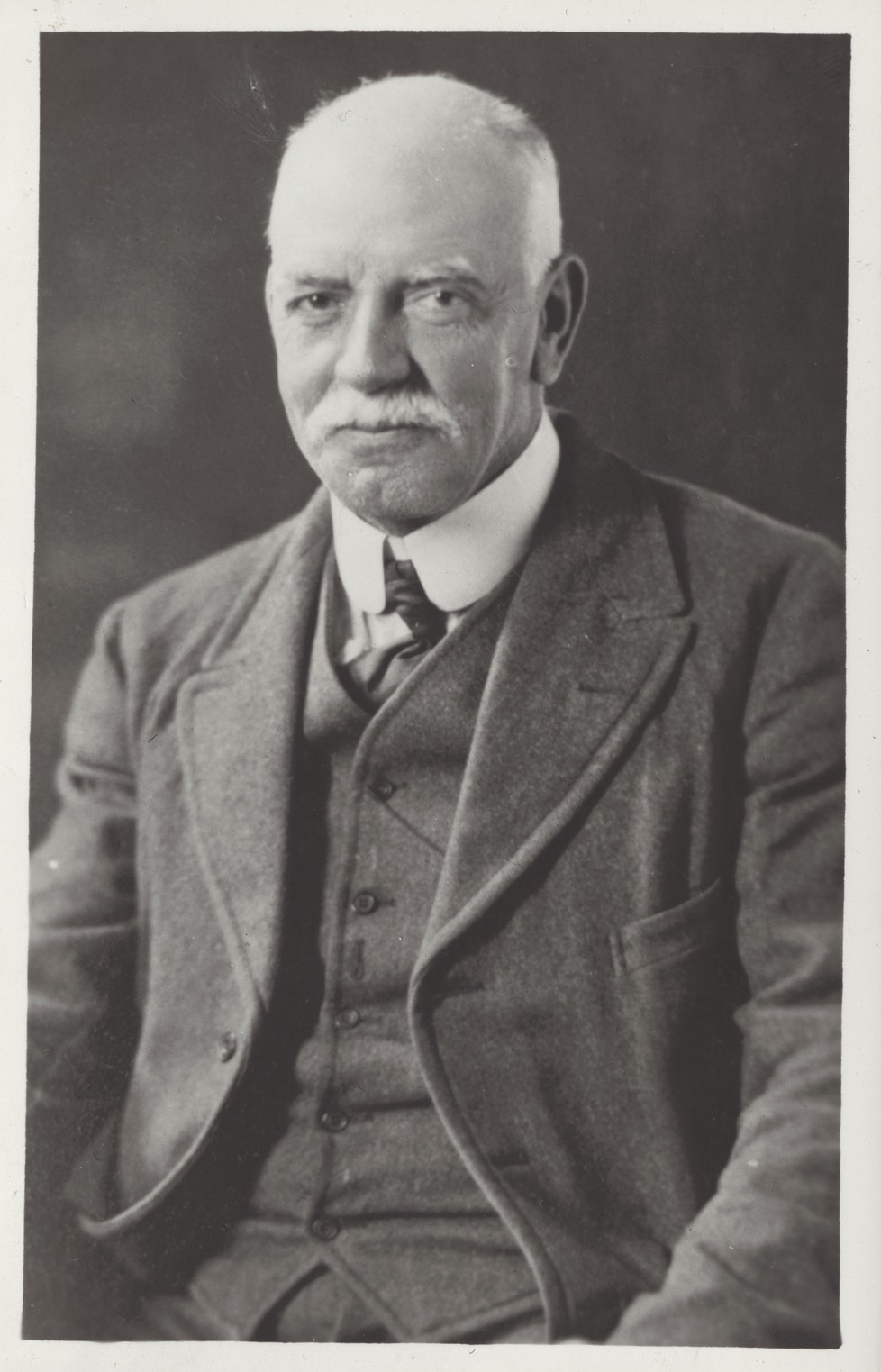
Frank S. Williamson

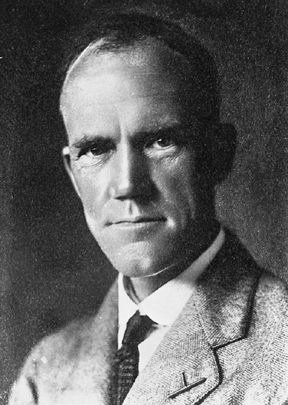
Sir Thomas Griffith Taylor

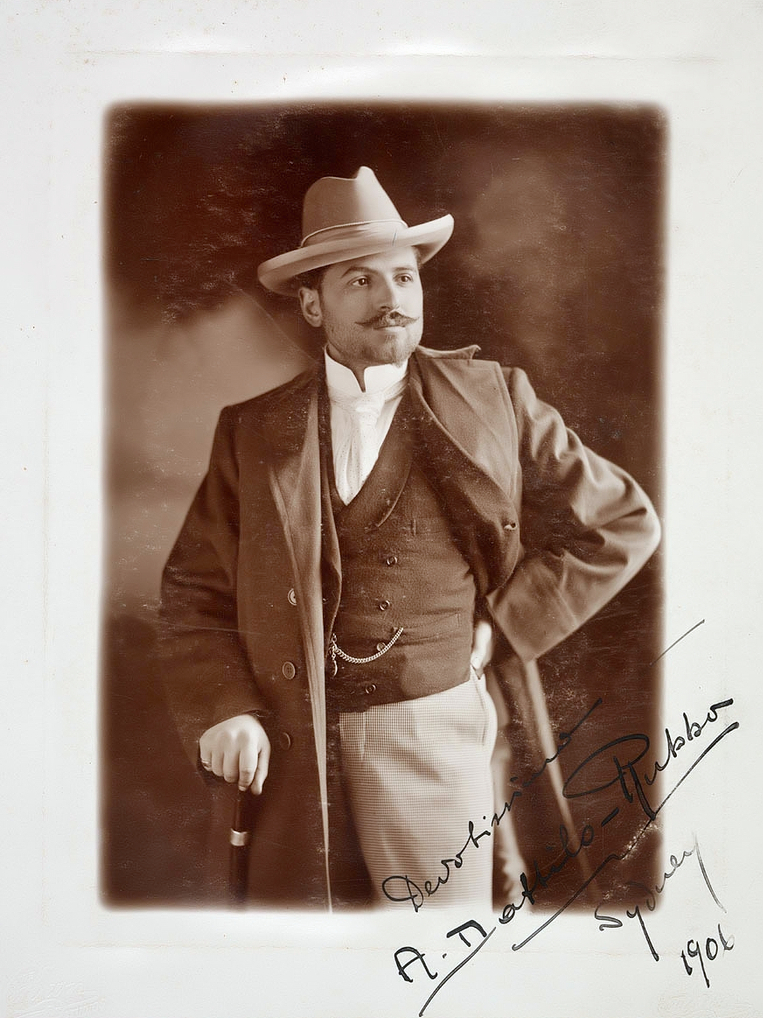
Antonio Dattilo Rubbo

These masters are further recognised by the naming of the Buchanan Oval, and Ben Jarvie Staff Common Room. Another long-serving master of the first half of the 20th century was Colonel Albert Douglas Arthur (1889–1949). In 1951 the college library was housed in a new room and renamed the A.D. Arthur Memorial Library in his honour. The library moved into the Nesbitt Wing upon its completion and when it moved again into Prescott Hall an adjoining study room was named the A.D. Arthur Annex. In 2014, past masters Phil Davis OAM and Robert Buntine were honoured with rooms in the AJ Rae Resource and Library Centre being named after them. Davis is the college's third-longest serving master (1951–2000), after Cortis Jones and Jarvie, and Buntine was the Deputy Headmaster during the headship of Tony Rae. Newington's longest-serving female member of staff is Ann Jagger, who worked in the Library and was a beloved Kelynack House mentor 1982-2025.

Staff members notable in the wider community include the following:

Staff member	Employed	Position held	Notability
Richard Thomas Baker	1880–1887	Science and art master	Curator of the Sydney Technological Museum, botanist and Clarke Medallist
Herb Barker	1966–1994	Physical education teacher	Wallaby, Empire Games track and field athlete, and played basketball for New South Wales
Sir Thomas Bavin KCMG	1891–1892	Student teacher	Premier of New South Wales, New South Wales Supreme Court Judge
Alan Bellhouse AM	1964–1973	Director of Music	Founded North Sydney Symphony Orchestra
Ernest Chapman OAM	1966–1972	Rowing Coach	Olympic medal winning rower
Paul Delprat	1967–1970	Art master	Artist and Principal of The Julian Ashton Art School
Judge David Edwards	1895–1897	Student master	Judge, NSW Electoral Commissioner and Royal Commissioner
Joseph James Fletcher	1882–1885	Science teacher	Biologist, Clarke Medallist and director and librarian of the Linnean Society of New South Wales
Harry Cortis Jones MBE	1897–1956	Senior master	Longest serving master; appointed Member of the Order of the British Empire for his service to education
Gary Knoke	1974–1980	Physical education teacher	Olympic Games and Commonwealth Games track athlete
Michael Morgan OAM	1981–2000	Physical education teacher	National championship and Olympic medal winning rower
Antonio Dattilo Rubbo	1898–1930	Art teacher	Artist and art educator
Sir Thomas Griffith Taylor	1904–1906	Science teacher	Geographer, anthropologist and world explorer
John Waterhouse	1874–1883	Student teacher Assistant master	Headmaster Sydney Boys' High School and Maitland High School
Frank S. Williamson	1894–1901	English teacher	Poet and wrote the words for Dear Newingtonia

== Students ==
=== Leaders ===
Since 1898 the senior prefect has been the captain of the school. The first student to hold that position was Sandy Phillips. In 2012, the Senior Prefect was Michael Cameron, whose father, Bruce Cameron, was Senior Prefect in 1974 and grandfather, Doug Cameron, was Senior Prefect in 1946. Since 1961 there has been a Deputy Senior Prefect and from 1991 it has been the custom to appoint two Deputies. A Senior Boarder Prefect has been appointed since 1932 when Philip Le Couteur, as Headmaster, instituted a House System. In 2022 the number of Houses doubled from eight to sixteen, with four Houses honouring female staff members for the first time. The houses are led by a House Captain and a House Vice-Captain, or two. Until 1988, a select number of students were appointed as Prefect. Since that time, it has been the practice in Term 4 to offer all Year 11 students the position of House Prefect and at the end of Year 12 to confirm as School Prefect all those judged to have discharged their duties in an exemplary manner. In 1950 and 1951, under the Headship of Mervyn Austin, Probationer Prefects were appointed and from 1953 until 1967 they were known as Sub-Prefects. That title was again used from 1983 until the current system of leaders was started in 1988. In one year only, 1971 during the Acting Headship of Owen Dudley, Monitors were appointed.

=== Dux ===
The title of Dux of the college is awarded to the best academic student each year in the senior form. Since 1865 that has been the Upper Sixth, Sixth Form and now Year 12 in both the IB and HSC courses. The first Dux announced was Andrew Houison during the early years at Newington House. From 1881, the Dux received the Schofield Scholarship (after Schofield's donation of £1,000 to the College) and since 1924 the Halse Rogers Prize (which was endowed by William and Elizabeth Halse Rogers). In more recent years these have been awarded jointly as the Schofield and Halse Rogers Prizes. Winners names were from 1881 inscribed on boards in the Prescott Hall but since 1976 the board has been in the Centenary Hall. Duces of Newington have included: Cecil Purser shared with James Ramsay (1881); George Abbott (1882); Harry Wolstenholme (1885); Herbert Curlewis (1886); William Parker (1887); Frederick Pratt (1888); John Halliday (1889), when he was known as Charles Halliday; David Edwards (1890); Edwin Hall (1891); Ernest Warren (1892); Harold Curlewis (1893); Walter Woolnough (1894); George Harker (1895); Leslie Allen (1899); Percival Halse Rogers (1900); Lindsay Dey (1904); Carleton Allen shared with Rupert Hollaway (1905); James McKern (1906); Ronald Aston shared with Henry Darke (1916); William Morrow (1921); Walter Bryan Ward shared with Philip Harrison (1924); Keith Jones (1927); Talbot Duckmanton (1937); John Veevers (1947); John Turtle (1953); Bob Baxt (1955); John Pyke (1957); Warwick Cathro (1964); and Patrick Cook shared with David Emery and Philip Neal (1967). David Murray (1909) and Roxy Muir (1913) died during World War I. Harold Hunt was Dux in 1884 and his son, Harold Hunt, was Dux in 1920. The Thomas family have three generations of Duces of Newington: Noel Thomas (1930); Rod Thomas (1960); and Peter Thomas (1988).

=== ONU Prize for Leadership, Scholarship and Sport ===
The ONU Prize for Leadership, Scholarship and Sport is the most senior of the citizenship prizes awarded at Newington and is presented for scholarship, sportsmanship and moral qualities. Loyalty and leadership are equally weighed in this award. It was first awarded in 1904 and shared by Thomas Gale and Oliver Woodward. It has been awarded annually since then and recipients have included: Carleton Allen (1905); Bryan Ward (1924) shared with Jonathon Joyce; John Lawes (1925) shared with Richard Hay; Denis Cowper (1926) shared with Den Joyce; Bym Porter (1927) shared with Arthur Parton; George Wright (1935); Marshall Hatch (1950); In 1967 to Kevin Amos and Peter Thornton; Graham Colditz (1972); and Stephen Rae (1979). For four years in a row the prize was awarded to students who were to serve and die in World War I: David Murray (1910); Morven Nolan (1911); Clifford Holliday (1912); and Roxy Muir (1913). In 2004 the name of this prize changed to the ONU Prize for Leadership, Scholarship and Sport.

== Campuses ==
Newington College is situated over five campuses, located in Stanmore, Lindfield and a service-learning campus at Eungai Creek on the mid-north coast of NSW:

=== Secondary school ===
The secondary campus is located in Stanmore, in Sydney's inner-west. The student body consists of approximately 50 boarders and 1,500-day students from Years 7 to 12 as of July 2026. Newington boarders come from country and city, interstate and overseas. Day students are drawn from all over the Sydney greater metropolitan area.

=== Wyvern House preparatory school ===
Newington has educated primary school (Kindergarten to Year 6) aged boys since 1863. In 1938 Wyvern House opened in a separate school building on the Stanmore campus and accepted its first students in 1939. Wyvern moved to new premises in Cambridge Street, Stanmore, a few minutes' walk from the secondary school, in 1998. As of July 2026 it had approximately 400 students – all day students. There are two classes in each of Years K to 2, three classes in Years 3 to 4 and four classes in Years 5 to 6. The Head of Wyvern House is Ben Barrington-Higgs. In January 2026, the first female students joined Wyvern House in Kindergarten and Year 5.

=== Lindfield preparatory school ===
The Newington College Preparatory School was established initially at Killara (1957) and later moved to Lindfield (1967), in response to requests from Old Newingtonians that a preparatory school be established on the North Shore of Sydney. The Head of Newington College, Lindfield, is Ben Barrington-Higgs. It is a single-stream school, with approximately 170 students from Kindergarten to Year 6 and is set in a bushland location where the students are constantly in touch with nature. The first female students joined Lindfield in January 2026 in Year 5.

The school features a basketball/tennis/netball court, climbing gym areas, swimming pool and connects to the bush trails of Swain Gardens. Each classroom includes effective information communication technology tools. Classrooms have dedicated computer and wet areas, and bag storage areas. There are special facilities for music, art and French. A tuckshop operates three days a week. The campus underwent a major redevelopment of classrooms and the addition of a new hall, library and visual arts room in 2011. Students in Years 3–6 compete in the Independent Primary School Heads of Australia (IPSHA) Competition held on Saturday mornings. Newington's preparatory schools combine for annual carnivals in swimming, athletics and cross country.

=== Eungai Creek campus ===
Newington opened a service-learning campus at Eungai Creek on the mid-north coast of NSW in 2025. It was officially opened on November 22, 2025.

The campus is home to a term stay program for Year 9 students to disconnect from devices and connect with the land and the local community.

== Houses ==
The house system at Newington was founded in the 1930s and in 2021 eight new houses were added. Originally houses were named after presidents and headmasters but the names now honour Old Newingtonians and important women in the history of the school. in 2022 the number of houses doubled to 16 with four Houses honouring female staff members for the first time.

House name	Colour	Named in honour of	Link with the College	Notes	References
Manton		Rev. John Manton		Founded Newington College at Newington House, Silverwater, in 1863, and served as its first Principal or President until his death in September the following year	
Fletcher		Rev. Joseph Horner Fletcher		Served as Newington's President from 1865 to 1887. He led the planning, fundraising and building of the new College at Stanmore and the move there in 1880	
Kelynack		Rev. Dr. William Kelynack		One of the leading Methodist churchmen of his era and served as Newington's President from 1887 until his death in 1891	
Moulton		Rev. Dr. James Egan Moulton		Helped found Newington College, acting as its initial Head Master in 1863. During his long service in Tonga, he founded Tupou College. He served as Newington's President from 1893 to 1900	
Prescott		Rev. Dr. Charles John Prescott		Newington's first modern Headmaster, combining the previous roles of President and Head Master. Serving from 1900 to 1931, he led the College through the trauma of the First World War	
Johnstone		Thomas Johnston (now considered the correct spelling)		Appointed as Newington's first Head Master and arrived from England in November 1863. A fine classical scholar, he served until the end of 1866	
Metcalfe		George Metcalfe		Newington's Head Master from 1867 to 1869. The first university graduate to teach at the College, he also introduced an early form of Australian Rules Football: he had been Vice-President of the Geelong Football Club in 1861, which had been founded two years earlier. After leaving Newington he founded a college in Goulburn and married Annie Gilligan, after whom one of Newington's newer houses is named	
Le Couteur		Philip Le Couteur		Newington's Headmaster from 1931 to 1948. He led the College through the challenges of the Depression, established Wyvern House and oversaw remarkable growth in student numbers	
Gilligan		Annie Gilligan		Appointed as housekeeper and present in the first College photograph, Annie Gilligan is known as Newington’s first female member of staff. She worked at Newington College from1863 to1869.	
Whitaker		Edith Whitaker		Edith Whitaker was the first qualified full-time and non-specialist (ie: not a visiting music or art teacher) female teacher and subject head, appointed due to teaching vacancies during the Second World War. Her appointment in 1942 as Head of English made her the first female subject head in a GPS school. She retired in 1949.	
Cooper		Sister Margaret Cooper		Sr Margaret Cooper was appointed in 1958 as Matron, first at Wyvern House, then for the whole school. She implemented modern health care standards in the sick bay and provided pastoral and emotional support for students before College wellbeing programs were put in place. She remained in this role until her death in 1981.	
Morrison		Jan Morrison	Senior Prefect Greg Haddrick and Jan Morrison in 1978	Appointed in 1976 as Head of Library, Jan Morrison was the College’s third professional librarian. A life-long avid reader, she transformed and modernised the library and its services by introducing computer cataloguing. Popular and widely known as ‘Conan the Librarian’, she retired in 1996. The present headmaster, Michael Parker, is her son-in-law.	
Tupou		Tupou College	King Tāufaʻāhau Tupou IV as a student at Newington College	The name of this house recognises both Newington’s long ties with the Kingdom of Tonga and Tupou College, as well as the only Newingtonian Head of state, King Tāufa‘āhau Tupou IV (ON 1936) who reigned in Tonga from 1965 to 2006.	
Bavin		Sir Thomas Bavin	Sir Thomas Bavin	An Old Newingtonian, Bavin held the highest political office of any Old Newingtonian serving as Premier of New South Wales from 1927 to 1930. He introduced a progressive tax system as part of a parliamentary career from 1917 to 1935. Also a successful barrister, he subsequently served as a judge of the Supreme Court of New South Wales. Born in New Zealand, Bavin came to Newington as a student in 1889 aged 15.	
Mackay		Sir Iven Mackay	Sir Iven Mackay	Sir Iven Giffard Mackay KBE CMG DSO VD (ON 1901) - Knighted (KBE), appointed a Companion of St Michael and St George (CMG), awarded the Distinguished Service Order (DSO), and awarded the Volunteer Officers' Decoration (VD) - held the highest armed services rank of any Old Newingtonian to date and, along with 'Sandy' Pearson (ON 1936), may be regarded as Newington’s greatest soldier.	
Clunies Ross		Sir Ian Clunies Ross	Sir Ian Clunies Ross	Sir (William) Ian Clunies Ross CMG (ON 1916) is regarded as one of the most influential figures in Australian science and has been described as the architect of science’s post-war boom through his chairmanship of the CSIRO. He is also the only Old Newingtonian featured on Australian currency, appearing on the $50 note.	

The house system at Wyvern House was founded in 1938 and honours early Headmasters.

== War memorials ==
The grounds and buildings of Newington College contain numerous war memorials:

=== Classrooms and science building ===
Work began in October 1952 on the War Memorial Classroom Block and the Old Boy benefactor W. R. Glasson unveiled the foundation stone. In June 1953 the building was opened by Colonel Thomas Millner MC, VD. The War Memorial Science Building was opened in July 1955 by Sir Iven Mackay KBE, CMG, DSO, VD when he unveiled a stone memorial wall with the following inscription:

TO THE GLORY OF GOD

THE WAR MEMORIAL CLASSROOMS AND SCIENCE BUILDING WERE ERECTED
SO THAT NEWINGTONIANS THROUGH THE YEARS MIGHT CONTINUALLY
HONOUR THE SERVICE SACRIFICE AND DEATH OF OLD NEWINGTONIANS
IN THE WORLD WAR 1939–1945

LET THE FINE MEMORIES
THY SOUL WITH LIMPID MIRRORING REPEAT

THIS SCIENCE BUILDING WAS OPENED 30TH JULY 1955
BY LT.-GEN. SIR IVEN MACKAY, K.B.E., C.M.G., D.S.O., V.D.,
AN OLD NEWINGTONIAN

=== Johnson Oval ===
Gunner Jack Johnson, an Old Newingtonian, died of wounds on a Belgian battlefield in 1917 and in his memory, his parents, Frank and Sarah Johnson, provided £1,100 for the college to level part of the existing playing fields. This provided a rugby union ground of full size, and was named the Johnson Oval. At the corners brick retaining walls, to a design by Arthur Anderson, protected the steep banks.

Eight other memorials at Newington are recorded on the New South Wales Government's Register of War Memorials in New South Wales.

=== Memorial to the Dead 1914–1918 ===
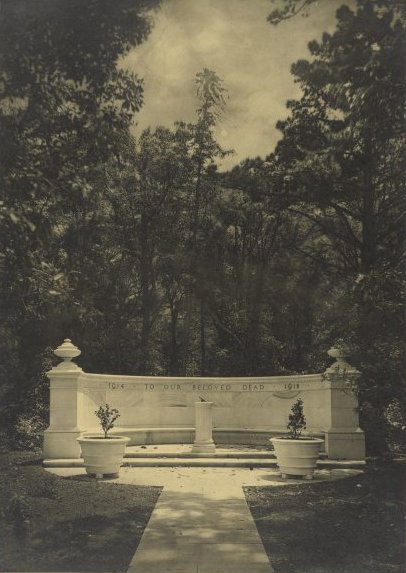
Memorial to the Dead 1914–1918 designed by William Hardy Wilson

The sandstone Memorial to the Dead was designed by the Old Newingtonian architect William Hardy Wilson and is now sited between the Centenary Hall and the chapel. It was originally placed in a grove of trees to the north of the Founders Wing but was moved to its present location in the early 1960s to make way for the construction of the Centenary Hall which was opened in 1963. The memorial comprises a semi-circular wall and seat, with pillars surmounted by white stone urns at either end and a column with a sundial stands at the centre. The inscription on the wall reads:

1914 – To Our Beloved Dead – 1918

and the inscription on the sundial reads:

Time dims not their sacrifice.

The memorial was dedicated on 11 May 1922 by the Governor General of Australia and the Old Newingtonian poet Leslie Holdsworth Allen wrote a poem, To our beloved dead, in memory of the occasion.

=== Gallipoli Lone Pine Memorial ===
Commemorating Prisoners of War during World War I, this tree comes from a seedling propagated from a pine cone brought home from Gallipoli by an Australian soldier. The tree stands in a triangular area of grass formed by the merging of the Cowlishaw Drive and the War Memorial Drive. A bronze commemorative plaque on a stone plinth has the following inscription:

The Gallipoli Lone Pine – During the 1914–1918 Great War, Australian and New Zealand forces landed at Gallipoli on 25 April 1915 to attack Turkish forces. Eight months later they withdrew. One significant battle occurred on the ridge where a lone pine stood. ANZAC forces finally occupied the Turkish position, but with the tragic loss of 2,227 men. Turkish losses were around 5,000. During the withdrawal from ANZAC Cove, an Australian soldier picked up a pine cone and brought it home, where the seeds were propagated. Since 1933, when the pines became of good size and yielded more seedlings, Legacy arranged for pine trees to be distributed to schools and interested groups to help keep the memory of the Gallipoli Lone Pine alive.

=== Chapel Memorial Tablets ===
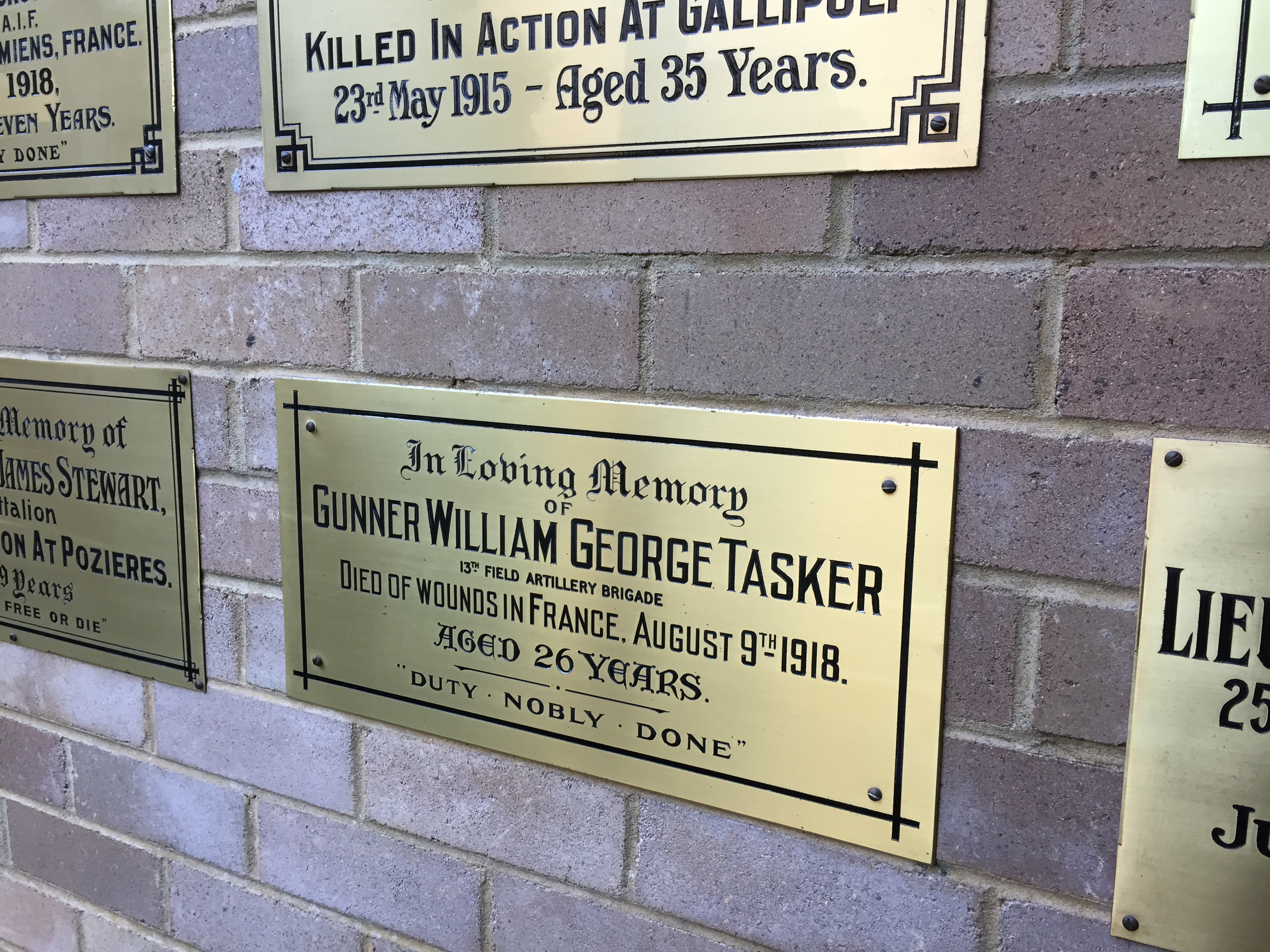
William Tasker's memorial plaque

Twenty four brass plaques were hung in Prescott Hall as memorials to individual Old Newingtonians who died during World War I. Further plaques were added after World War II but they were all removed when the hall was renovated in 1979. They were then placed on the first floor balcony of the War Memorial Classroom Block. They were later placed in the archives collection. In 1995 they were restored and repositioned in the chapel's glass ambulatory overlooking the 1914–1918 Memorial to the Dead. Included amongst these plaques is one in memory of William Tasker (15 October 1891 – 9 August 1918) who was a World War I soldier who had been a national representative rugby union player making six Test appearances for the Wallabies.

=== War Memorial Driveway ===
In 1936 the War Memorial Drive was planted with 75 poplars, each with a cross at the foot and a plaque honouring individual Old Newingtonians who died during World War II. The trees were replaced by a new avenue of trees in 1966 and the plaques were replaced by a tablet on a plinth with the inscription:

Lest We Forget – This plaque was dedicated on 24 September 1966, to mark the planting of trees alongside the War Memorial Drive by the Old Newingtonians' Union to restore those originally planted by the Union on 29 February 1936. By this act Old Newingtonians remember those Old Boys who gave their lives in the service of God, King and Country, and whose names are recorded on the War Memorial of the School.

Fifty of the original plaques remain in the archives collection. In 1979 the War Memorial Drive was realigned and replanted and the 1966 plinth was moved to the Millner Gates end of the drive. On 30 November 2016, the Memorial Drive was rededicated as a College war memorial, with a single tree planted to represent the original avenue of poplars.

=== Boer War Honour Roll ===
A bronze tablet recording the names of 44 Old Newingtonians who served in the Boer War hangs in Prescott Hall in the Founders Wing. It is set in a Gothic frame of columns with a plinth and cornice. The inscription reads:

Floreat Newingtonia – Erected by Old Boys of Newington College in honour of Newingtonians who fought for the Empire in South Africa 1899–1902.

The Memorial was designed by Old Newingtonian architects Henry Budden and William Hardy Wilson and was dedicated on 15 December 1903.

=== World War I Honour Roll ===
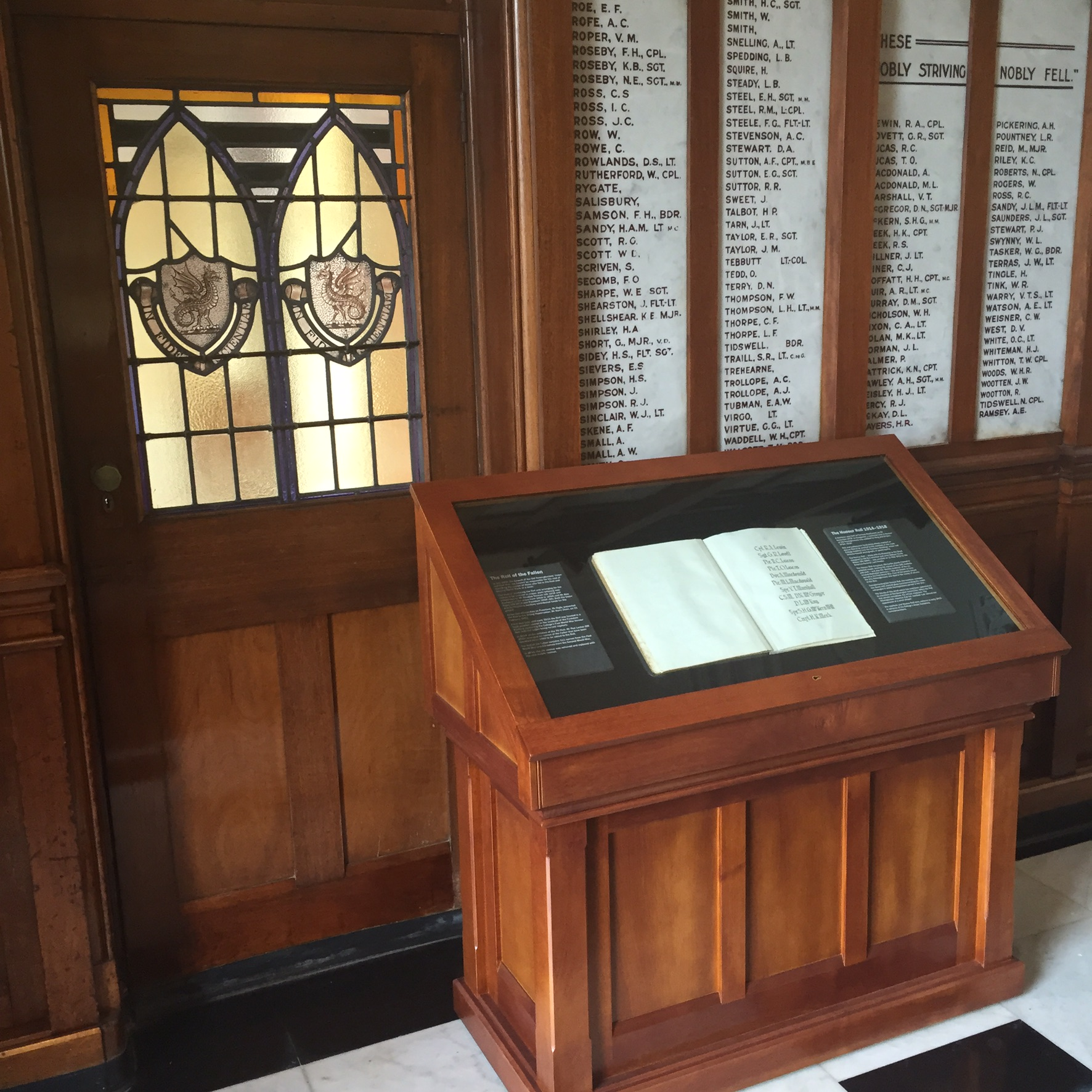
World War I Honour Roll in the foyer of Founders Wing

Over six hundred Old Newingtonians enlisted during World War I and the loss of life was appalling. By war's end, 109 Old Boys had died for God, King and Country. Prior to 1920 the walls of the vestibule at the entrance to the Founders Wing had been hung with sporting teams photographs. In 1921 this space was transformed by the installation of white marble tablets, encased in Queensland maple, upon which were inscribed the names of Old Boys who had served. Those who had made the supreme sacrifice are listed on the central panels below the words:

These Nobly Strining, Nobly Fell.

With a black and white marble floor and stained glass door panels this space takes on the feel of a small chapel.

=== World War II Honour Roll ===
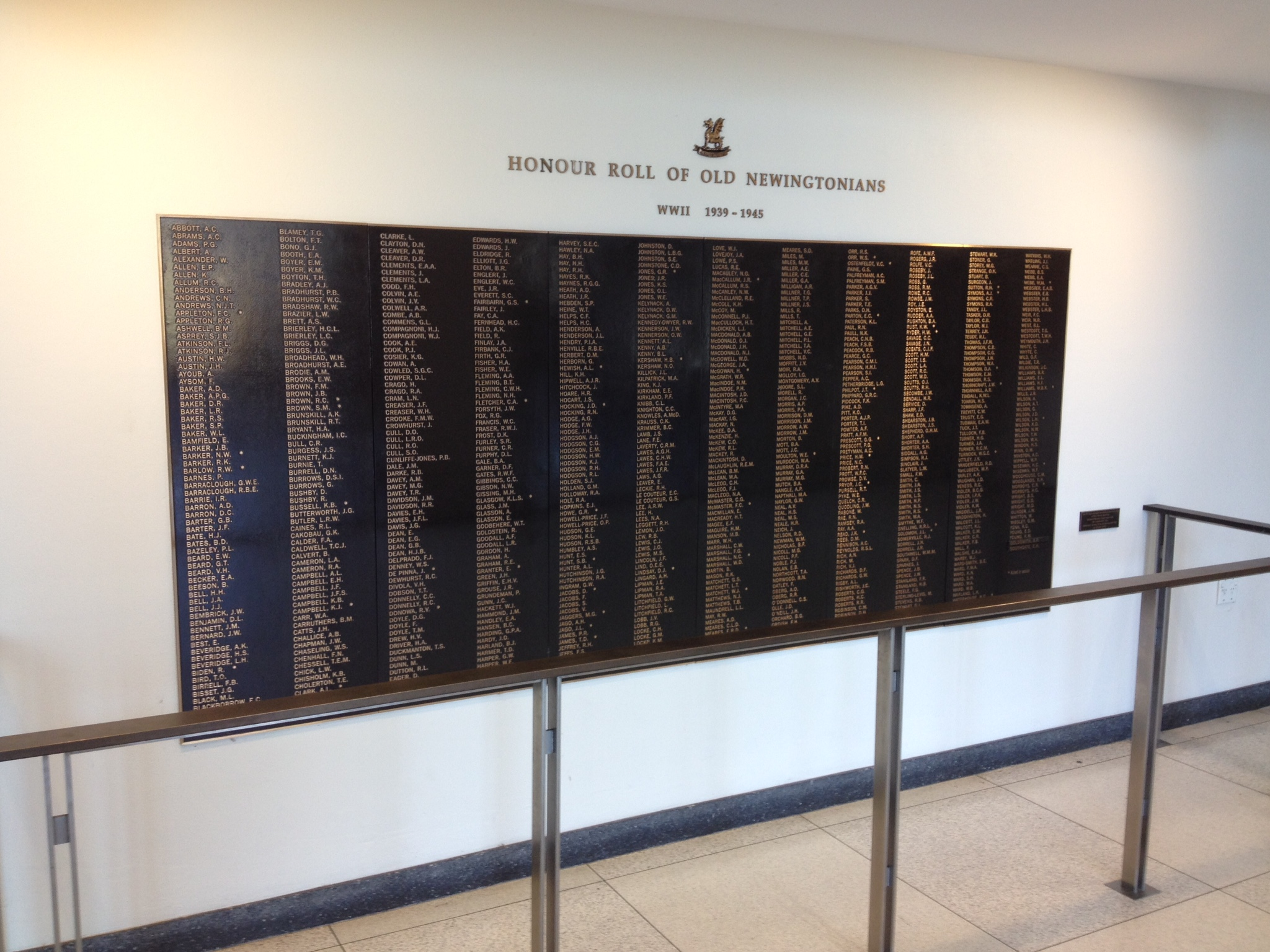
World War II Honour Roll in the foyer of Centenary Hall

A wall of brass and enamel panels in the Centenary Hall foyer records the names of the 814 Old Newingtonians who served in Australia's armed forces in World War II. The inscription reads:

Honour Roll of Old Newingtonians World War II 1939–1945.

This honour roll was dedicated on Anzac Day 2009 by Old Newingtonian Major General Sandy Pearson AO, DSO, OBE, MC and replaces a roll in the same position that was unveiled by Sir William Morrow DSO, ED in 1966.

=== Post-World War II Honour Roll ===
This wooden honour board records the names of 77 Old Newingtonians who served in Australia's armed forces in conflicts post-World War II and is on the southern wall of the Centenary Hall foyer. It is inscribed:

In every generation good men must defend what they believe to be right and Newington remembers with pride her sons who served their sovereign and country in the cause of liberty in international conflicts from 1948 to 1973.

It commemorates service in the Korean War, Malayan Emergency, Malaysian-Indonesian Confrontation and Vietnam War.

=== War memorial prizes ===
The following are presented in honour of Old Newingtonians who made the supreme sacrifice:

- Holliday Prize for Divinity in Year 10. Donated by his parents in memory of Clifford Dawson "Bob" Holliday who was killed in action in France in 1916 during World War I. This prize was originally awarded for scriptural knowledge in the Sixth Form. Holiday was at Newington 1905–1914.
- David Jacobs Trophy – awarded to the most successful non-competition Rugby Union team above the Under 13s. Donated by his brothers in memory of David Jacobs who was killed during a flying battle over the Timor Sea in 1942 during World War II. Jacobs was at Newington 1933–1935.
- Harry Kershaw Cup – awarded to the Best All-Round Sportsman. Donated by his parents in memory of Henry "Harry" Burton Kershaw who was killed during a flying battle over New Guinea in 1943 during World War II. Kershaw was at Newington 1922–1930.
- Jack Thorncraft Trophy – awarded for Loyalty and Service to the college. Donated by M A Dawes in memory of Jack William Herbert Thorncraft who died in 1942 during World War II. Thorncraft was at Newington 1935–1937.
- Warry Cup – awarded to the Senior Athletics Champion. Donated by his parents in memory of Victor Thomas Symes Warry who was killed in action in France in 1915 during World War II. Warry was at Newington 1912–1914.
- Stretton Waterhouse Memorial Prize – awarded to the Dux of Year Ten. Donated by Gustavus Athol Waterhouse in memory of his son, Stretton Gustavus John Waterhouse who was killed in action in New Guinea in 1943 during WW II. Waterhouse was at Newington 1929–1931.

== Curriculum ==
The school teaches the core curriculum outlined by the NSW Board of Studies (BOS) between Kindergarten and Year 8. From Years 9 to 12, students adhere to the Board of Studies curriculum standards that all NSW schools follow.

Newington became an International Baccalaureate (IB) World School in May 2007, and from 2008 has offered the IB Diploma to Year 11 students, as an alternative to the NSW Higher School Certificate (HSC). The College also offers Vocational Education and Training (VET) and Cambridge IGCSE, which was introduced in 2024.

== Co-curriculum ==
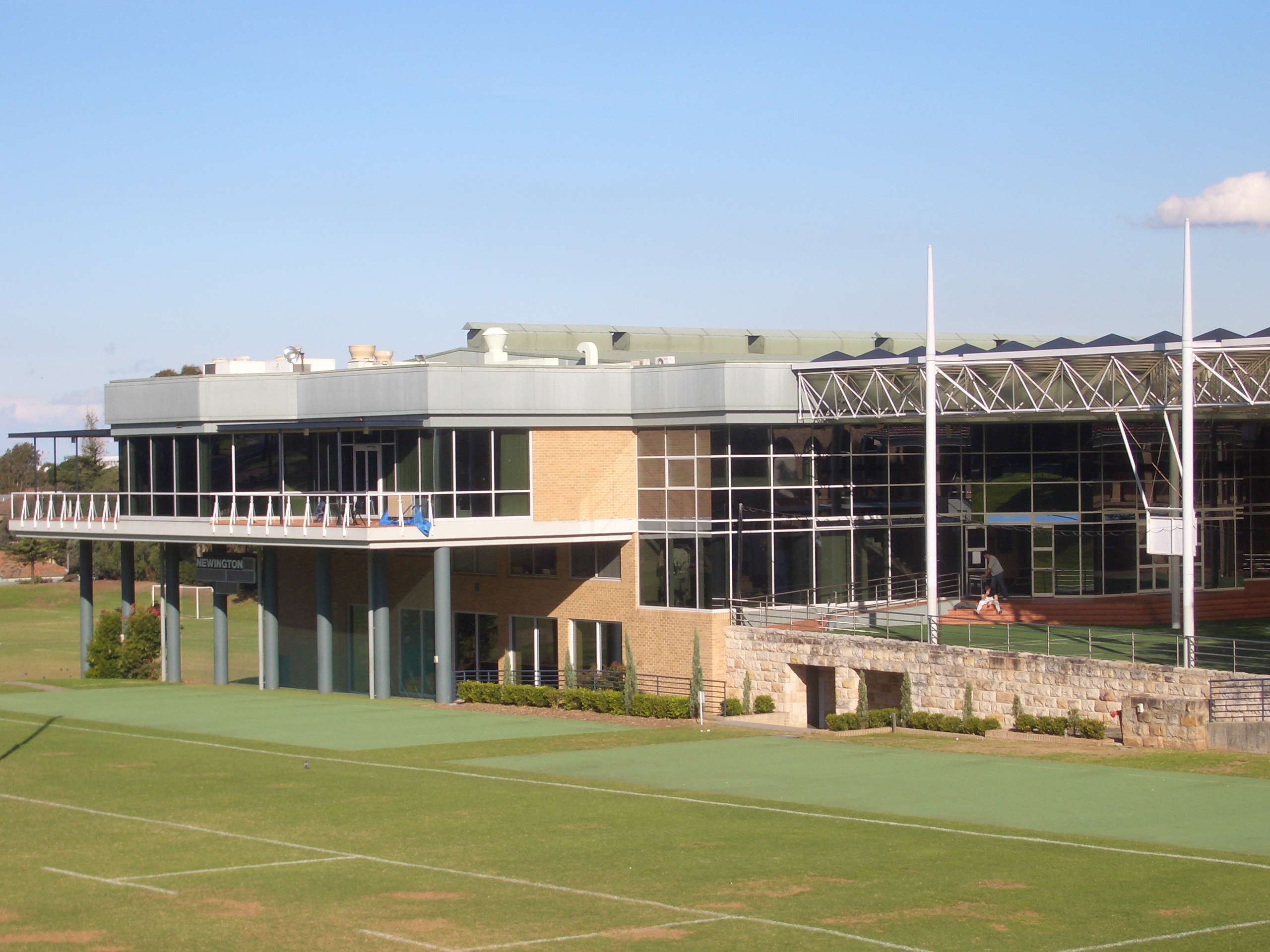
The Johnny Taylor Physical Education Centre at Stanmore

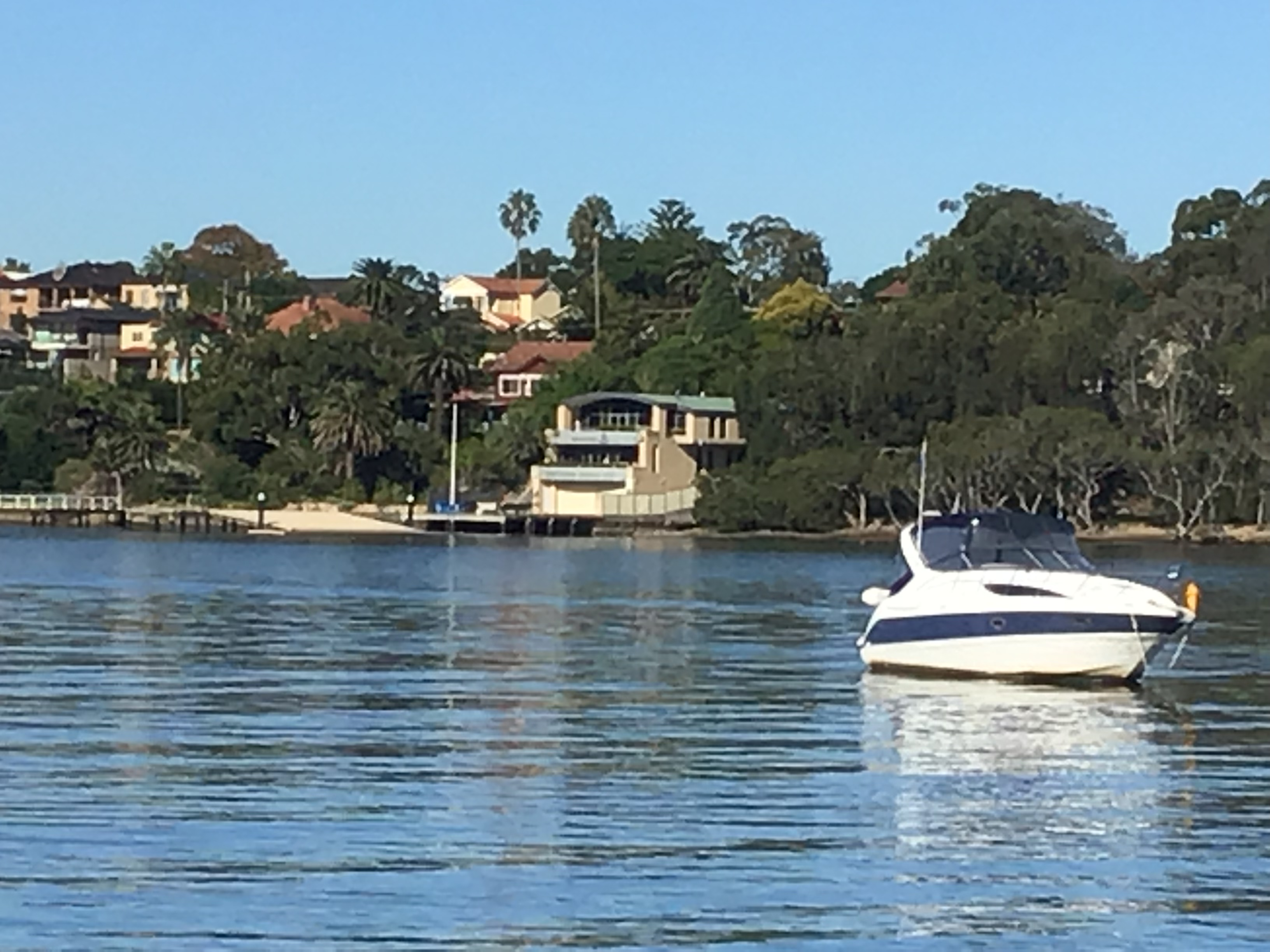
The Robert Glasson Memorial Boatshed at Abbotsford

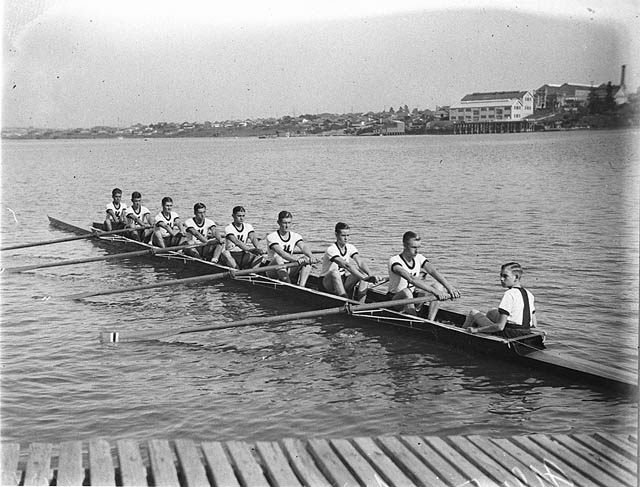
Newington's eight-oar crew in 1932

Newington students may participate in the following co-curricular activities:

- Cadets – The Newington College Cadet Corps (now Unit) was founded in 1869 and pre-dates the Australian Army. Activities include abseiling, archery, bushcraft, canoeing, drill, first aid, lifesaving, mapping, orienteering and radio operation. There is also a service band and service orchestra.
- The Duke of Edinburgh's Award – This scheme is offered either as a stand-alone activity, or as part of Cadets.
- Music – Founders Concert is Newington's major music performance annually and joint choral concerts are held with MLC School. The Symphonic Winds group compete in public festivals and challenges and the Chapel Choir provide music year long at house services and evensong. All group participate in the GPS Music Festival.
- Drama – Newington produces a musical theatre every two years, as well as both a senior and middle school production every year. Newington also is involved in Theatresports, hosting the Inner West Cup annually, as well as competing in Impro Australia's Theatresports Schools Competition.
- Sport – Newington is one of the nine members of the Athletic Association of the Great Public Schools of New South Wales (GPS) and participates in all GPS sporting competitions as well as several non-GPS or traditional sports. Newington students may participate in a variety of sports including: Athletics, Australian Football, Basketball, Cricket, Cross Country, Fencing, Judo, Rowing, Rugby union, Soccer, Swimming, Tennis, Volleyball and Water Polo.

=== Basketball ===
The official GPS basketball competition commenced in 1975, with both 1sts and 2nds trophies. In the first GPS competition, Newington came second in a narrow defeat to Kings in the deciding match, and five members of the 1sts team were selected for the first Combined GPS basketball teams. Newington’s 1sts teams have been high achievers at the Australian School Championships: winning bronze in 2010, 2012 and 2023; silver in 2020 and gold 2013-2015. In 2018 the 1sts were GPS and NSW CIS champions, and in 2024 were crowned AAGPS, NSW CIS and Trinity tournament champions. Basketball continues to be one of the most popular sports, with both the 1sts and 2nds dominating the early 2020s GPS competition.

=== Rowing ===
Newington has a history of producing rowers, coxswains, and coaches who have gone on to represent NSW and Australia in rowing. The rowing program has produced many Olympic and World Championships rowers including: James Chapman (1992–1997), 2012 Summer Olympics rowing silver medalist; Tom Chessell, 1952 Summer Olympics rowing Bronze Medallist; Sam Hardy 2019 World Rowing Championships Bronze medalist, 2020 Olympics, 2022 World Rowing Championships Bronze medallist. Rob Jahrling 2000 Summer Olympics rowing Silver Medallist; Fred Kirkham 1956 Summer Olympics rowing Bronze Medallist; Matthew Long 2000 Summer Olympics rowing Bronze Medallist; Michael Morgan 1968 Summer Olympics rowing Silver Medallist; Geoff Stewart 2000 & 2004 Summer Olympics dual rowing Bronze Medallist; James Stewart 2000 & 2004 Summer Olympics dual rowing Bronze Medallist; Stephen Stewart 2004 Summer Olympics rowing Bronze Medallist and Richard Wearne World Rowing Championships Silver & Bronze Medallist. Newington has produced several Australian representatives at senior, Under 23 and Junior levels. At 1996, 2000 and 2004 Olympics, there were four alumni in each of those Olympic Rowing teams.

== The Newingtonian ==
The annual year book of Newington College is called The Newingtonian and dates to the early 1880s. Three hand-written news sheets with the title The Newingtonian were circulated in 1883 but the first printed issue of the magazine was published in June 1884. The aim of its founding editors was ‘...to place on record the simple annals of boyhood'. A quotation from the Latin poet Horace — Memor Puertiæ, translated as 'remembering boyhood' — served as The Newingtonian's motto until 1951. This briefly reappeared on the 1971 issues. The magazine was initially published as a quarterly, with an index for every twelve issues. From 1919 until 1940 The Newingtonian appeared three times a year and then was published twice a year until 1972 when it first appeared as an annual. The size changed to its present format in 1971. From its early days the magazine was setting the agenda for change in the college and upon the arrival of James Egan Moulton as president an 1894 issue called for a school song. The first photograph appeared in 1896 of the Rugby Union1st XV and the magazine has been in full colour since the 1980s. As with other traditional school magazines, The Newingtonian has carried reports of major events, of academic and sporting achievement, of co-curricular activities and of many other aspects of the school's day-to-day life. Even before the founding of the Old Newingtonians' Union in 1895, the magazine has profiled the achievements of alumni. During the South African and World Wars records of Old Newingtonians armed service were published. Between 1995 and 2000 a separate publication of the same format known as The Old Newingtonian was published by the college. Many print issues are held by the College Archives, by the State Library of New South Wales and the National Library of Australia, and some issues have been digitalised.

== Gallery ==
Glasson Pavilion and Old Chapel Drama Centre

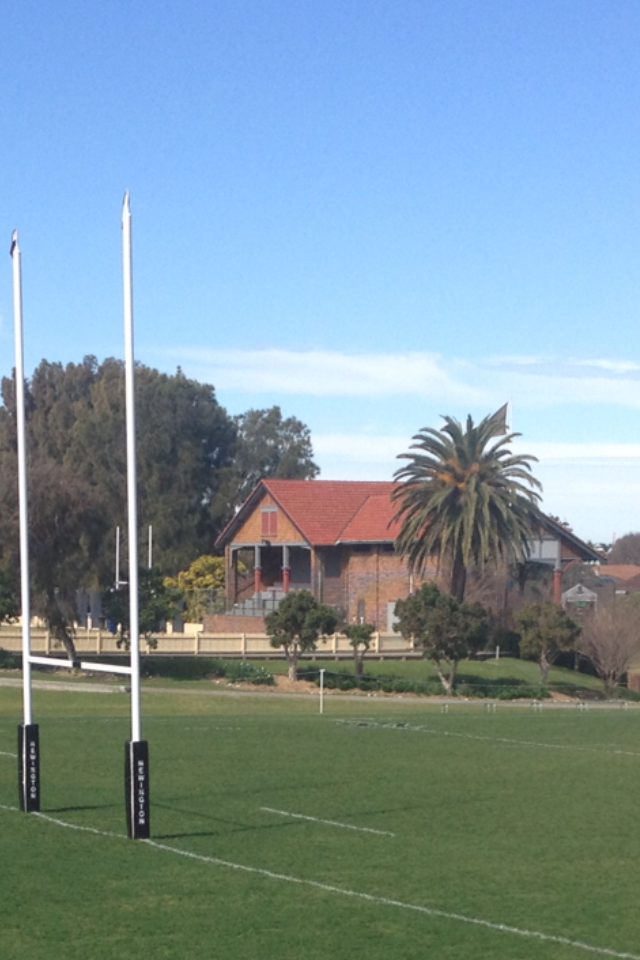

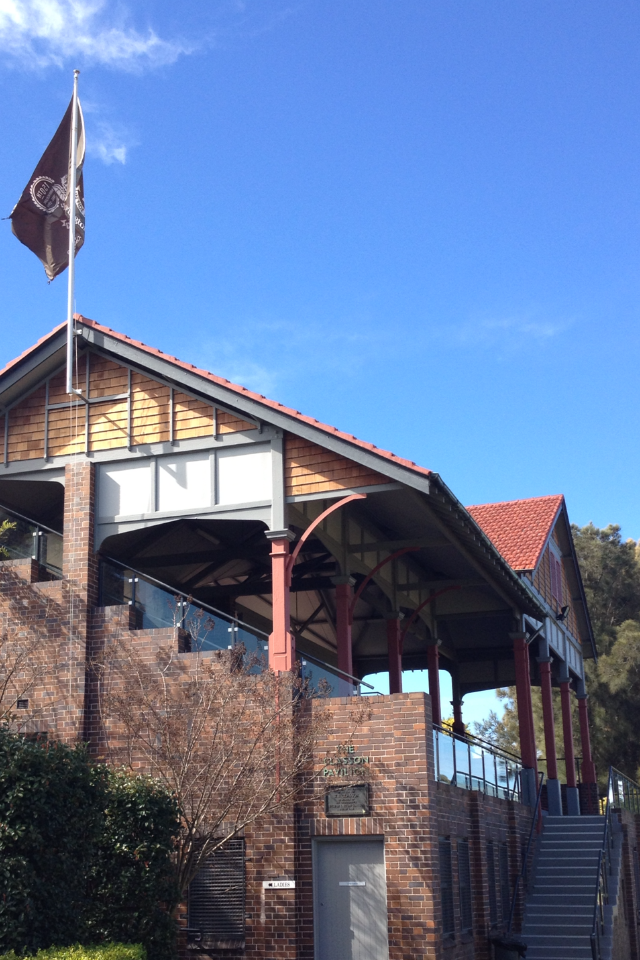

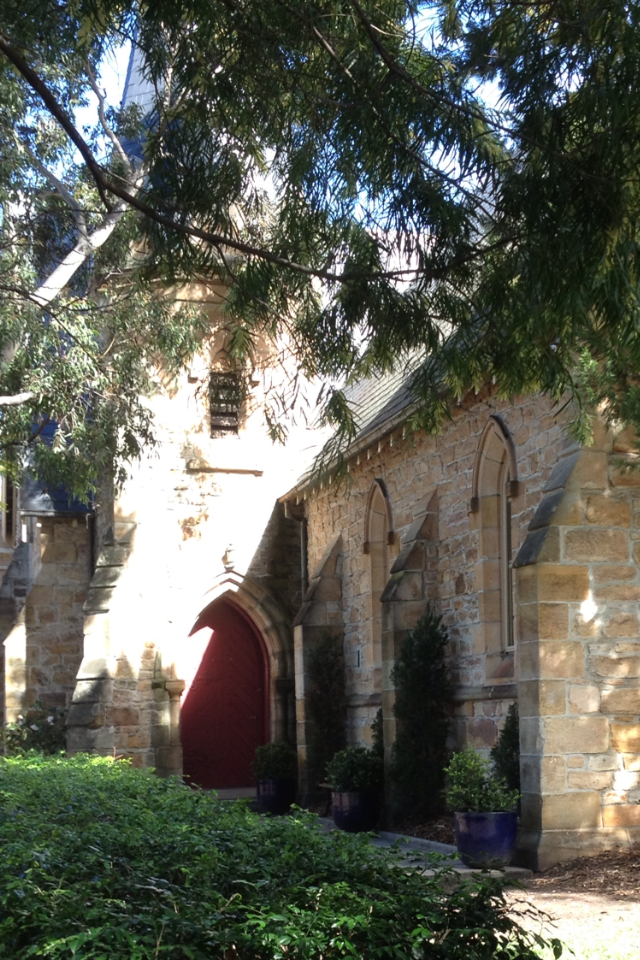

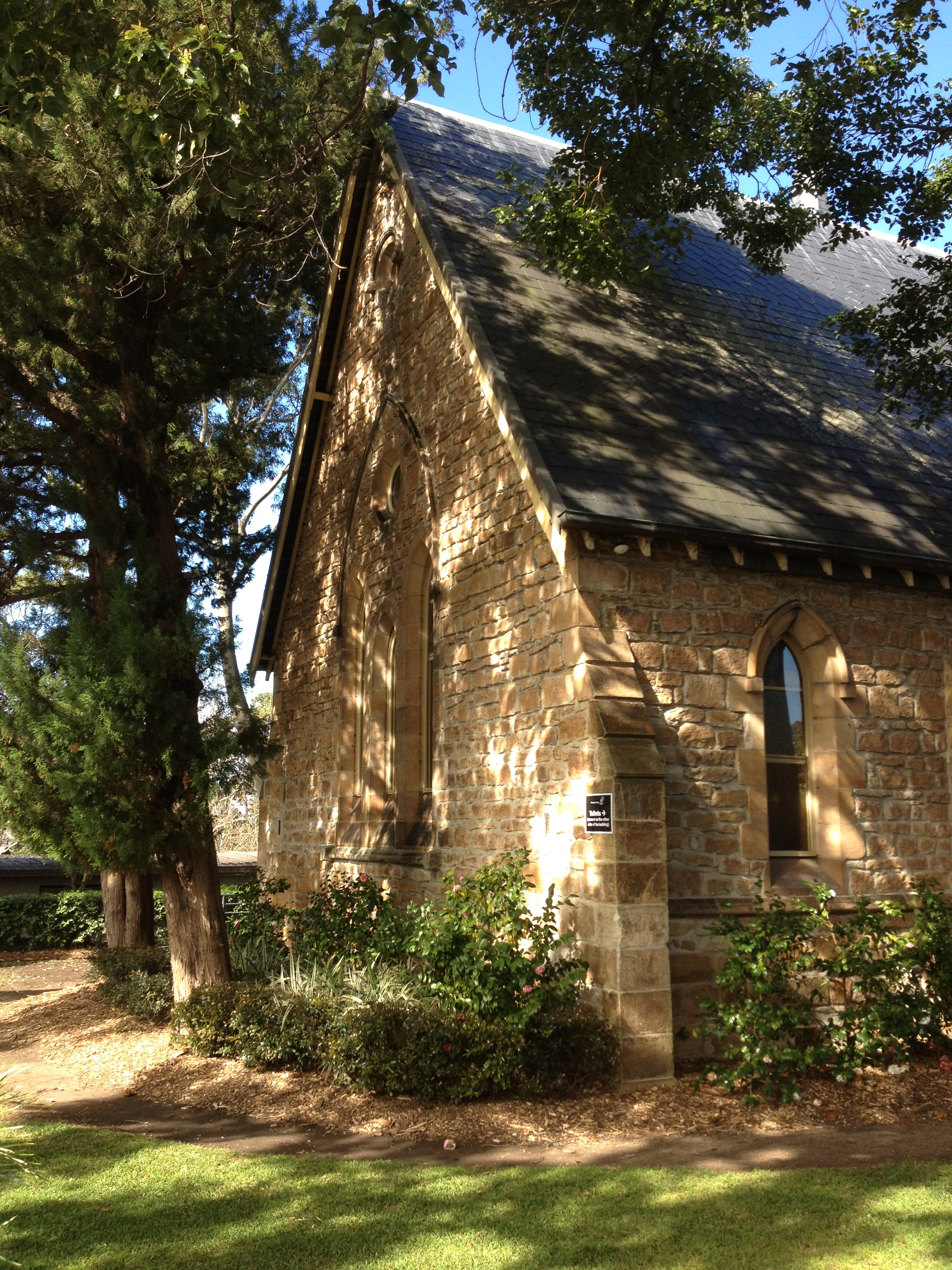

Dixon Gates, Stanmore Road fence, Sevington tennis courts and the Centre for Critical Thinking and Ethics.

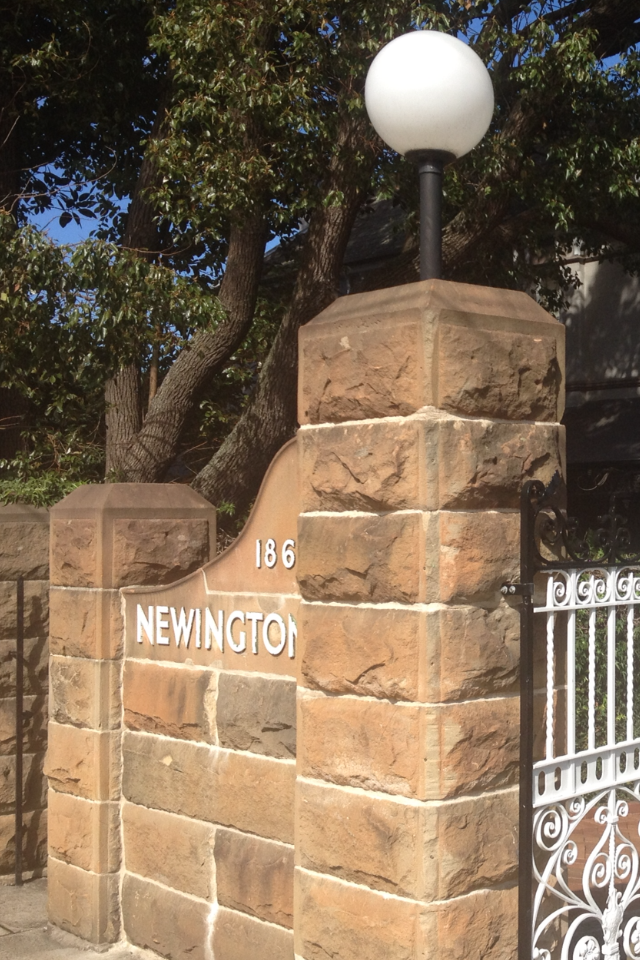

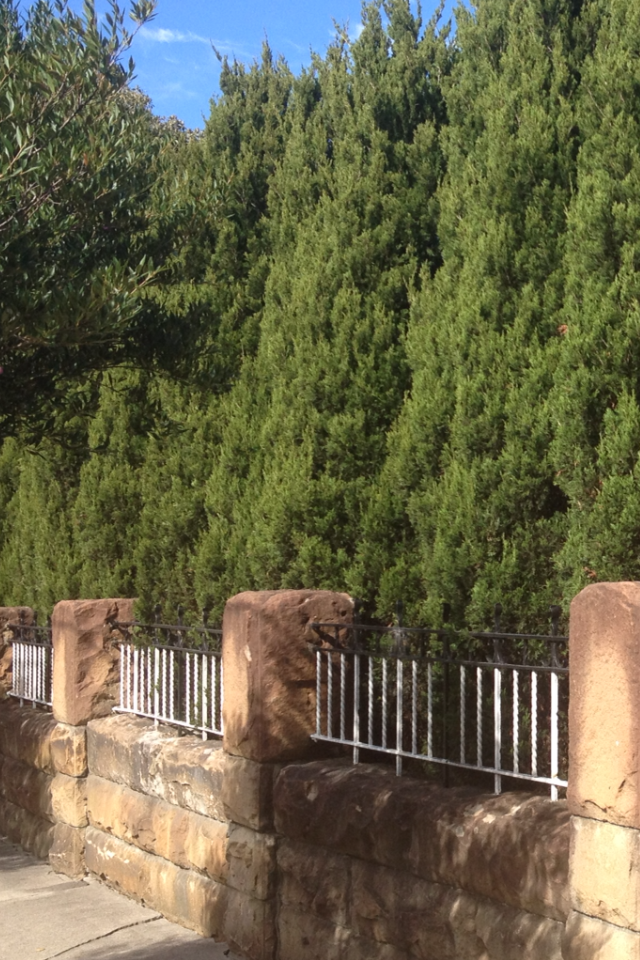

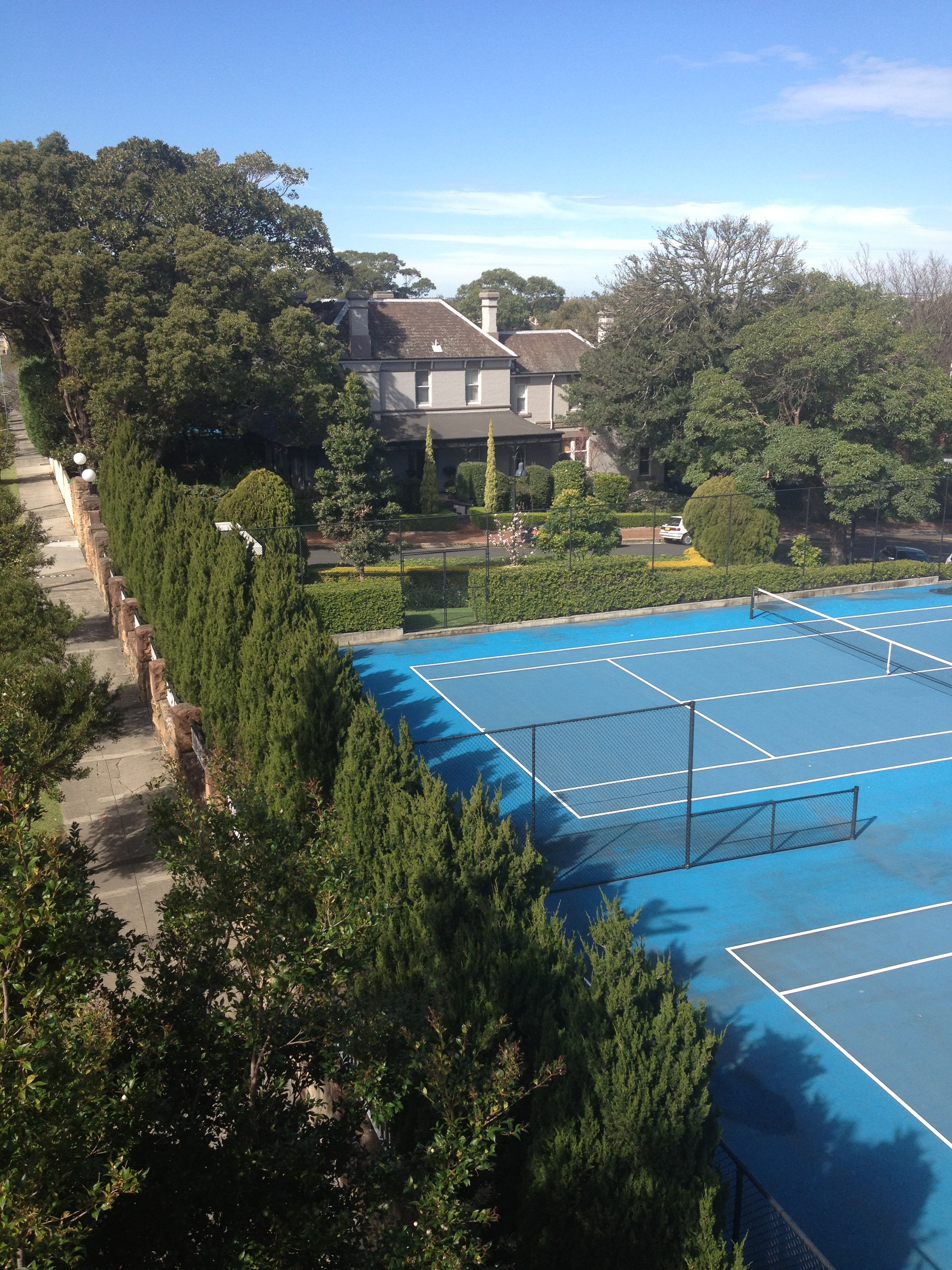

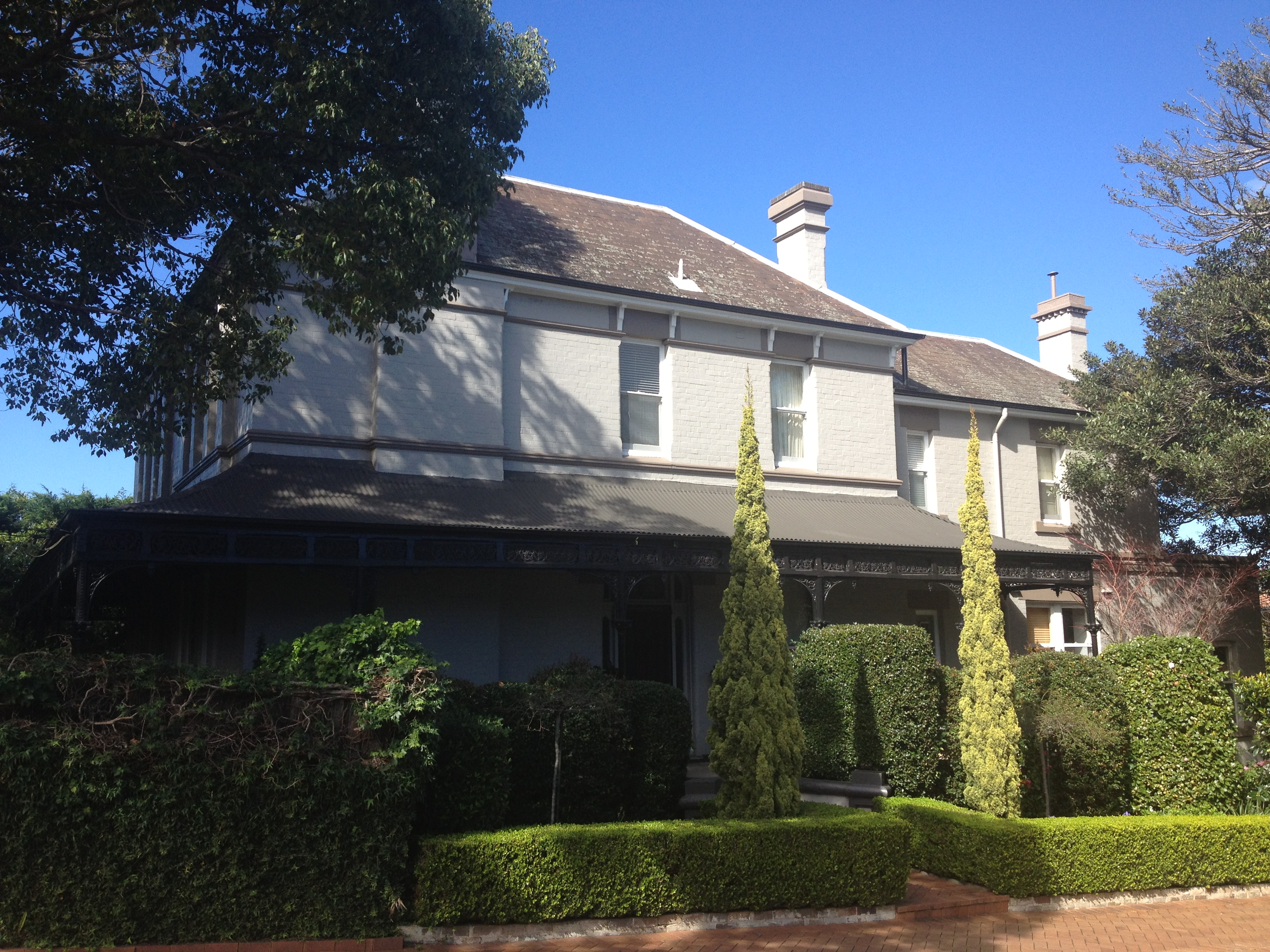

Founders, the tower and Prescott Hall

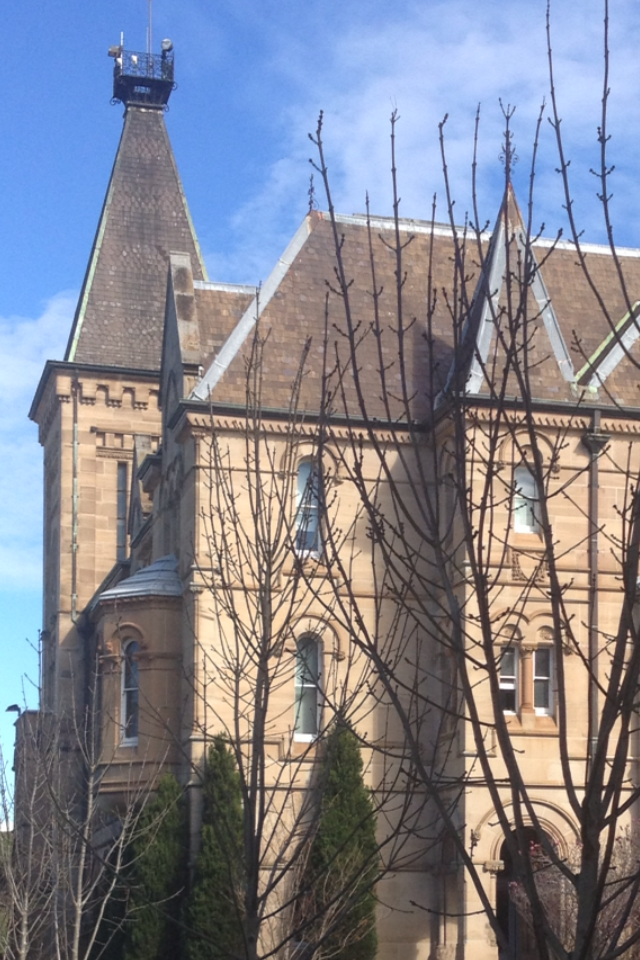

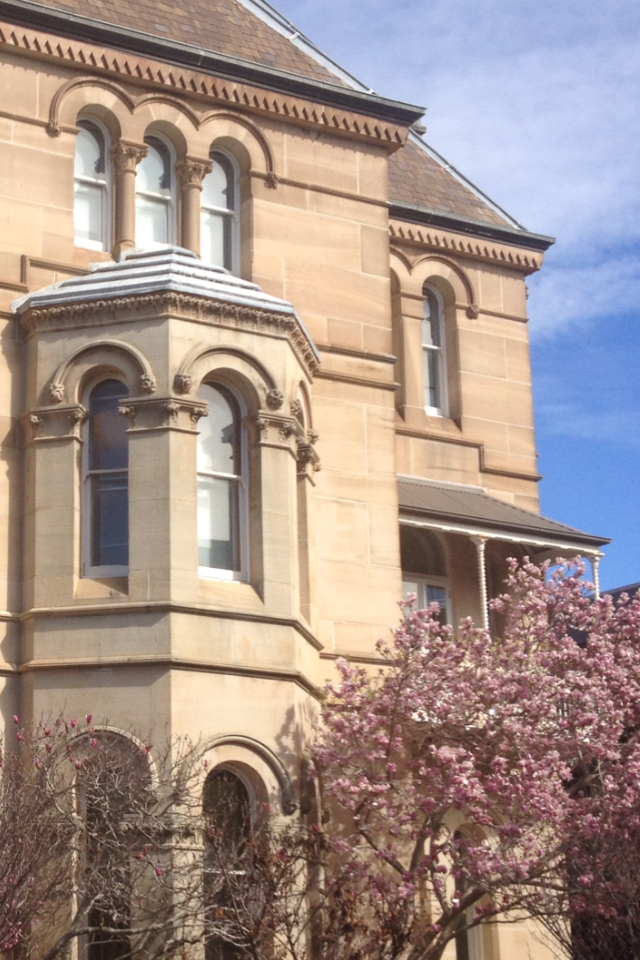

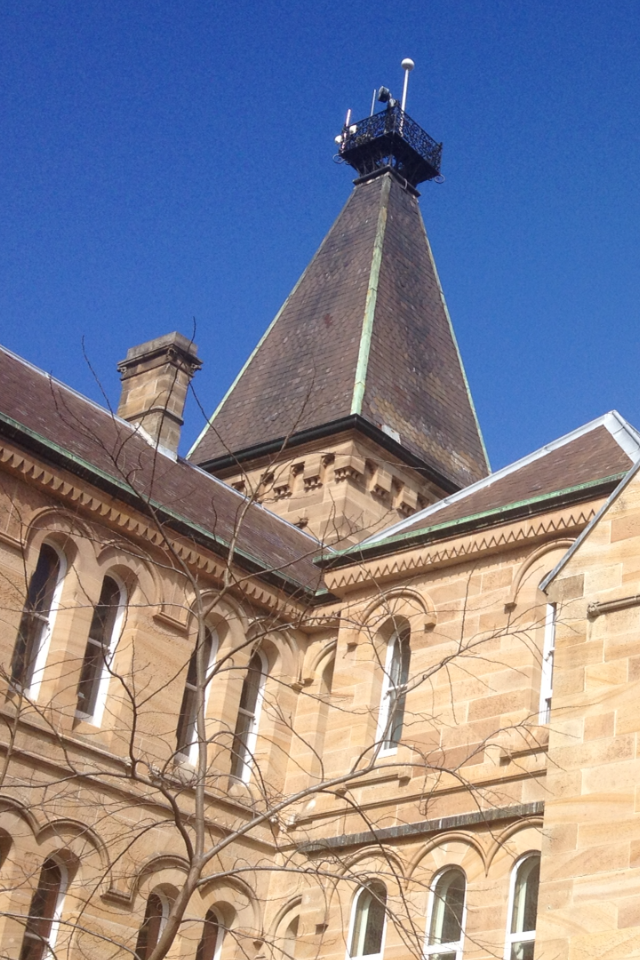

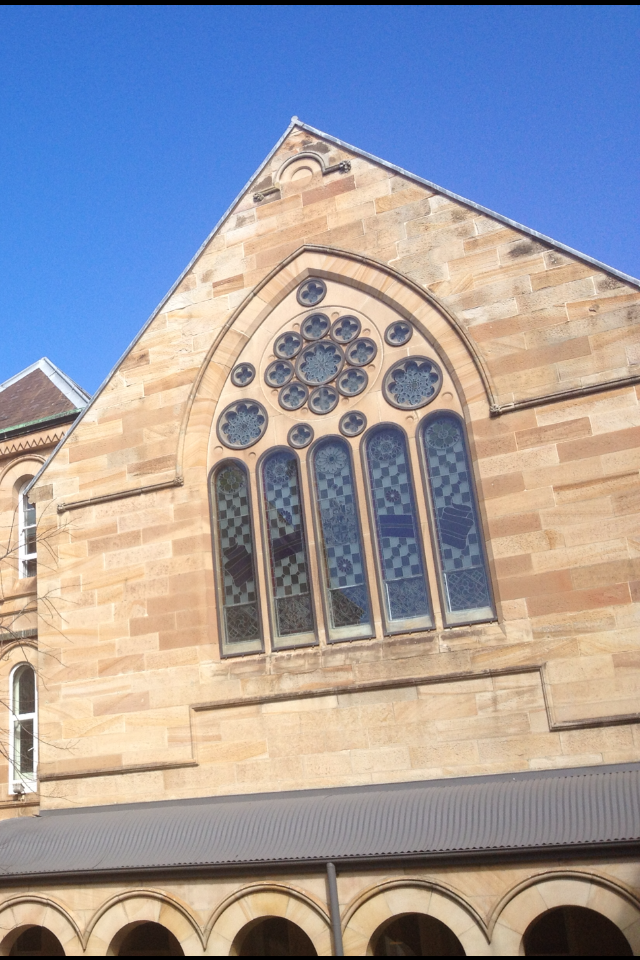

== Alumni ==
Former Old Newingtonians Union Logo

Alumni of Newington College are known as Old Newingtonians and may elect to join the college's alumni association, the Old Newingtonians' Union. The Union was founded in 1895, with James Egan Moulton, the Newington College President, as its inaugural President and Sir Thomas Bavin as secretary. As stated in its constitution, the aims of the ONU are to:

"... strengthen the bonds between Old Newingtonians and between Old Newingtonians and the College; foster and develop active participation in, and support of, the affairs of the College and of the Union; support and promote the Newington Foundation and the Old Newingtonians' Union Centennial Trust; organise and carry out social functions in pursuance of the objects of the Union; promote the interests and welfare of the College in all its aspects; commemorate those Old Newingtonians who have given their lives in the service of their country; and provide club facilities for members of the Union either solely or in conjunction with other clubs, unions or associations of ex-students of other schools".

The school's bi-annual publication The NC is sent to all alumni whose current addresses are known to the Union. The Union previously published directories of Old Newingtonians at five yearly intervals however that publication has been superseded by an online directory.

Affiliated organisations of the Union are: Old & New Theatre Company; Lodge Wyvern, a Masonic Lodge; and The 70's Club, a luncheon club for senior alumni. The Old Newingtonians' Union is a member of the GPS Old Boys Unions' Council.

Presidents of the Union are now normally elected for three one-year terms and are supported by the ONU council. The council comprises a treasurer, a secretary, councillors and past presidents. Council members must be alumni of the College. During the centenary, Sir Keith Jones was president of the Union (1963-64) and in the ONU centenary year His Honour Judge Fred Kirkham was president (1995-96). A past chairman of Newington College Council, The Hon. Justice Angus Talbot, has also served as president (1997-98). Other notable presidents of the Union include The Hon. Samuel Moore MLA (1896, 1898, 1904 & 1916), Arthur Lucas (1897); Cecil Purser (1899); George Abbott (1901); The Hon. William Robson MLC (1902 & 1905); William Horner Fletcher (1903), Percy Colquhoun MLA (1918 & 1919), Henry Budden CBE (1920), Lt Col Alfred Warden VD (1923 & 1924); Carl Glasgow MLA (1929 & 1930); Col Tom Millner MC, VD (1937, 1938, 1945 & 1946); Garth Barraclough OBE (1948 & 1949), The Hon. Richard Thompson MLC (1952 & 1954), Alex Rigby AM, ED (1959 & 1960), and Roger Davidson OAM (1972 & 1973).

=== Old Newingtonians ===
For notable Old Newingtonians see:

== See also ==
- Lawrence Campbell Oratory Competition
- List of boarding schools in Australia
- List of non-government schools in New South Wales
- Leigh College
- Wesleyan Theological Institution
- Wyvern House
