= Michael Parker =

Michael Parker or Mike Parker may refer to:

== In arts and media ==
- Michael Barrymore (born 1952), British television personality and entertainer born Michael Parker
- Mike Parker (reporter) (1943–2018), Chicago television reporter
- Mike Parker (writer) (born 1966), British travel writer
- Michael Parker (novelist) (born 1959), American novelist and short story writer
- Mike Parker (typographer) (1929–2014), American typographer and type designer
- Worldwide (rapper) (born 1986), American hip-hop musician, real name Michael Parker
- Mike Parker, eighth place finalist on twentieth season of American Idol

== Others ==
- Michael Parker (politician) (born 1949), former U.S. congressman from Mississippi
- Michael Parker (courtier) (1920–2001), private secretary to the Duke of Edinburgh, 1947–1957
- Mike Parker (hurdler) (born 1938), British hurdler
- Michael Parker (bishop) (1900–1980), bishop in the Church of England
- Michael Parker (event organiser) (1941–2022), producer of military tattoos and large-scale events
- Michael Parker (basketball) (born 1981), American-born Japanese basketball player
- Mike Parker (American football) (born 1975), American football linebacker
- Michael Parker (hurler) (1881–1958), Irish hurler
- Michael Parker (headmaster), Australian educationalist
