= Lawrence Pyke =

Australian headmaster and university dean

LRD "Lardy" Pyke
- Born: 1912; Queensland
- Died: 1987 (aged 74–75); Victoria, Australia
- Education: Wesley College, Melbourne; University of Melbourne; University of Oxford
- Occupations: Headmaster; University Dean
- Spouse: Mavis (née Clarke)
- Children: John Pyke, Robert and Jane
- Parent(s): Richard and Lillian Pyke

Lawrence Richard Dimond Pyke (1 November 1912 – July 1987) was an Australian headmaster and university dean. Referred to in print as LRD Pyke, this led to his nickname of "Lardy".

== Early life ==
Pyke was the son of Richard, an accountant, and Lillian Pyke, a teacher, journalist and author. He was one of three children and was educated at Wesley College, Melbourne. In 1927, on his mother's death, Pyke was orphaned and he was adopted by Lawrence Adamson, the bachelor Headmaster of Wesley. Pyke graduated as a Bachelor of Science form the University of Melbourne and as the 1934 Victorian Rhodes Scholar gained a Master of Arts from the University of Oxford.

== Early career ==
After returning to Australia from Oxford University, Pyke taught at his alma mater, Wesley. He then worked as a lecturer and in research and administration at the University of Melbourne. In the late 1930s, Pyke married Mavis Clarke and they had three children: John Pyke, Robert and Jane.

== Headmaster ==
From 1952 to 1960 he was headmaster of Newington College, Sydney. Pyke led the College through a period of unprecedented growth, both in the size of its enrolments and in the transformation of its physical fabric. He worked profitably with the College Council, particularly on a succession of building projects. Physically, the Stanmore campus had changed little since the imposing Wyvern House had been built in 1938. Continued growth in enrolments meant that new facilities were desperately needed. In 1952 work started on the War Memorial Block, the first of a series of permanent, modern buildings to be built along the southern boundary over the next few years. The building was opened in June 1953. Pyke was only the second scientist headmaster at Newington (most had been classical scholars) and he was keen to improve facilities for teaching Chemistry and Physics. A new science block was opened in 1955 followed by a manual arts block, including a new tuckshop, which was opened in 1957. He set in plan the ambitious project to complete the vision for the southern half of the original building by replacing old wooden structures with a modern building to balance the original stone north. Preliminary work started in 1959 on the building incorporating new classrooms, boarders' accommodation, an enlarged library and a new staff common room. Another important development under his leadership was the establishment of a preparatory school on the North Shore. A number of regions of Sydney were investigated in 1956 for opportunities to meet local demand for quality education and to increase the flow of primary students to the senior school at Stanmore. The Newington College Preparatory School at Killara opened at the beginning of 1957 and had 100 pupils by the end of the year. The expansion of the Newington's facilities reflected the growth in enrolments. There were some 600 boys in 1952 and this had risen to 970 by 1960. In the same eight years, teaching staff in the senior school grew from 23 to 42 staff members. Pyke was a progressive educator. While he gave particular attention to improving the teaching of science, the overall standard of education improved. This legacy, as much as the physical transformation of the school, marks his leadership at Newington. He resigned during 1960.

== University of Melbourne ==
In 1961 he returned to the University of Melbourne as dean of graduate studies. Following retirement he died in July 1987.

Preceded by Mervyn Austin	Headmaster; Newington College; 1952–1960	Succeeded by Dr Ernest Duncan
