= John Pyke =

Australian physicist and university law lecturer

- Born: 28 August 1940 (age 85); Melbourne, Victoria Australia
- Education: Newington College; University of Sydney; University of New South Wales
- Occupation: Retired Law lecturer
- Parent(s): Mavis and Lawrence Pyke
- Relatives: Lillian Pyke (grandmother)

John Richard Pyke (born 28 August 1940) is an Australian physicist and a former university law lecturer. In retirement he still writes about Constitutional Law. He was a Queensland Senate candidate at the 2001 and 2010 Australian Federal Election.

== Family ==
Pyke was born in Melbourne, Victoria, the first son of three children born to educator Lawrence Pyke and his wife Mavis (née Clarke). He is the grandson of the teacher, journalist and author, Lillian Maxwell Pyke (1881–1927).

== Education ==
From 1952 until 1957, Pyke was educated at Newington College, where his father was Headmaster. He is a BSc from the University of Sydney, an LLB from the University of New South Wales and an LLM from the University of Sydney.

== Career ==
Pyke was a physicist for 15 years before studying law. He then taught law at the University of New South Wales and Macquarie University before moving to the Queensland University of Technology in 1983. He has taught Litigation, Land Law, Family Law, Contracts, Trade Practices, Introduction to Law, History and Philosophy of Law, Law in Context, Jurisprudence, Legal Research and Writing, Legal Institutions and Method, and a number of Constitutional Law subjects. Pyke's main interests lie in the fields of legal reasoning and constitutional law. Pyke has been a consultant to the now-defunct Electoral and Administrative Review Commission and to the independent member for Nicklin, Peter Wellington, on constitutional matters, and has made several submissions to Parliamentary Committees and to the Queensland Constitutional Review Commission. He is the QUT Law School’s coordinator of the Queensland Parliamentary Internship Program, under which students earn credit for doing research for a member or a committee of the Queensland Parliament.

== Political candidate ==
In 2001 Pyke ran for election to the Senate on a Queensland ticket for Republican Party of Australia. At the 2010 Federal election Pyke campaigned for governments to impose stricter limits on the numbers of poker machines allowed per State and for limits on the feed rate and to keep up the pressure on all governments to adopt the Productivity Commission's recommendations, and progressively do more to reduce governments' dependence on gambling taxes.

== Publications ==
- 2007 Legal Institutions and Method - Third Edition (with A I MacAdam)
- 2007 Indescribably Strange Powers, Australian Publican Movement - ARMLET p3
- 2006 Who is Head of State?, ARMLET: Newsletter of the Australian Republican Movement p1
- 2004 Book Review: HP Lee and G Winterton (eds), Australian Constitutional Landmarks, Queensland University of Technology Law and Justice Journal p121-123 (with A I MacAdam)
- 2003 A Constitutional Nation, The Verdict p30-32
- 2003 Letter to the Editor, Australian Law Journal p414-415
- 2003 Our Constitutional Nation: Yes, States have Constitutions Too - Kind Of ..., The Verdict p33-35
- 2002 Book Review: Parliament - The Vision in Hindsight, Proctor p32
- 2001 Globalisation - The Bane of Popular Sovereignty?, Beyond The Republic: Meeting The Global Challenges To Constitutionalism p205-214
- 1999 Let's leave hysteria to the monarchists, The Australian Republic - The Case For Yes p78-89.
