= Lillian Pyke =

Australian children's writer and novelist

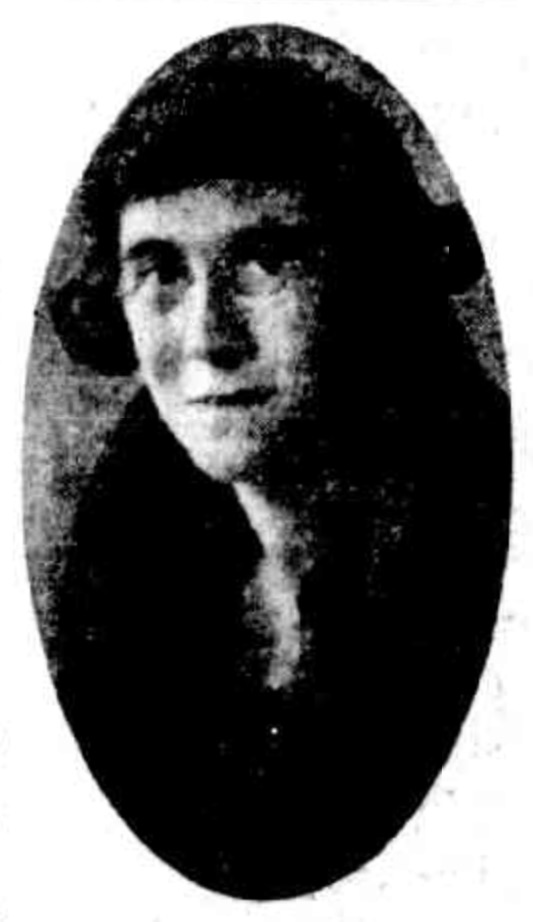
- Pyke in 1924
- Born: Lillian Maxwell Heath; 25 August 1881; Port Fairy, Victoria, Australia
- Died: 31 August 1927 (aged 46); Brighton, Victoria, Australia
- Children: 3, including Lawrence Richard Dimond Pyke
- Relatives: John Richard Pyke (grandson)
- Writing career
- Pen name: Erica Maxwell
- Genres: Children's fiction; novelist

Lillian Maxwell Pyke (25 August 1881 – 31 August 1927) was an Australian children's writer who also wrote adult novels using the pseudonym Erica Maxwell.

== Biography ==
Pyke was born Lillian Maxwell Heath, the tenth child of Robert Mosely and Susannah Ellen Heath (née Wilson). She was educated at University High School in Melbourne.

Pyke worked as a teacher and journalist prior to her marriage. She married Richard Dimond Pyke on 7 April 1906 and the couple moved to near Gympie, Queensland, where he was an accountant for railway construction. They had three children before his death by suicide in December 1914. He had been suffering from depression and had a breakdown at the end of an investigation into the relationship between him and fellow staff members, but there was no evidence of financial mismanagement.

Pyke took her children to Melbourne where she took up writing again to support the family. She is credited with translating the first Australian novel into Esperanto.

Pyke died in hospital at Brighton, Victoria on 31 August 1927 and was buried in Box Hill Cemetery. She had been suffering from chronic renal disease. She was survived by her two daughters and son.

== Works ==
- Pyke, Lillian M. (1919), Camp kiddies: a story of life on railway construction, The Specialty Press
- Pyke, Lillian M. (1924), Brothers of the fleet, Sutcliffe, Norman (illustrator), Ward Lock
- Pyke, Lillian M. (1924), Squirmy and bubbles: a school story for girls, Clark, Perce (illustrator), Whitcombe & Tombs
- Pyke, Lillian M. (1926), Three bachelor girls, Ward, Lock
