= Ronald Aston =

Australian physicist and civil engineer (1901–1969)

- Born: 23 July 1901
- Died: 7 September 1969 (aged 68)
- Scientific career
- Fields: Physics · Civil engineering

Ronald Leslie Aston (23 July 1901 – 7 September 1969) was an Australian physicist and civil engineer.

Aston was born in Burwood, New South Wales, and attended Newington College (1912-1918) and the University of Sydney. He taught civil engineering at the University of Sydney from 1930 until 1966. In 1956 he was appointed associate professor. Earlier he had been physicist on the Imperial Geophysical Experimental Survey from 1929 until 1930 and had tutored at the University of Melbourne in 1928 and 1929.

Aston was President of the Royal Society of New South Wales in 1948.
