= Michael Parker (headmaster) =

Australian educationalist

- Born: Sydney
- Education: James Ruse Agricultural High School; University of Sydney
- Spouses: Assoc Professor Fiona Morrison
- Website: Newington College Headmaster

Michael Parker is an Australian educationalist who is currently the 19th headmaster of the Sydney GPS school Newington College. He was the deputy headmaster of Cranbrook School, the principal of Oxley College and is an enthusiastic proponent of a liberal education and critical thinking. He has contributed to the public debate in Australia on improving education on consent, gender relations and climate change. In 2026, Newington became co-educational after 163 years as a boy's school, with the admittance of girls into Kindergarten and Year 5 at Wyvern House Preparatory in Stanmore and Year 5 at Lindfield Preparatory. Female students will join the senior school in Year 7 and Year 11 in 2028 with the college fully co-ed by 2033.

== Family and education ==
Born in Sydney, Parker grew up in the north-western suburbs of North Rocks. Parker attended the academically selective James Ruse Agricultural High School in his teenage years. He is an arts and law graduate of the University of Sydney. Upon graduation, Parker commenced his career as a high school teacher. Parker has a master's degree in teaching philosophy to children and he continues to teach at Newington College several times a week. He is part of the expert critical thinking team who lead The Centre for Critical Thinking and Ethics at Newington.

His wife, Fiona Morrison, is an associate professor in literary studies at UNSW and they have two adult daughters.

== Career ==
- English teacher and housemaster – Cranbrook School
- Teacher – Eton College
- Head of English – Newington College 2002 to 2007
- Deputy headmaster at Cranbrook 2008–2014
- Principal – Oxley College 2014–2018
- Headmaster – Newington College since 1 January 2019

== Publications ==
- Talk with Your Kids : Ethics : conversations about honesty, bullying, difference, acceptance and 105 other things that really matter
- Talk with Your Kids : Big Ideas : conversations about democracy, infinity, environment, war and punishment, humanity and 77 other big ideas
- Masters in Pieces : The English Canon for the twenty-first century. Co-written by Fiona Morrison
- His young adult novel Doppelganger was shortlisted for the New South Wales Premier's Literary Awards in 2007
- His teen novel Laverick High Inc was published by Longmans in 1993
- He also co wrote a children's picture book You are A Star which was published in the US, Brazil, Korea and China
- His Ethics Book : was republished in October 2021 with new material and a new title Talk with Your Kids about Things that Matter.
- Thinking for Yourself was co-published with his wife Fiona Morrison in October 2025 through Ventura Press.
- In addition, he has written six textbooks in the fields of Legal Studies, Philosophy in Schools and English.
- Justice Law and Society Books 1 and 2. Published by Longman Cheshire 1993, 1995, 1999.
- The Quest for the Stone of Wisdom. A student book and teacher's guide published by Ashton Scholastic in 1995.

== Documentary ==
A documentary Inspiring Teachers, which followed Parker's teaching during 2007, was screened on SBS Television in 2008 and 2009.

== Travel ==
Parker is widely travelled. He lived with the Japanese mafia and climbed to Camp One at 20,000 feet on Mount Everest.

Educational offices
Preceded by Dr David Mulford	Headmaster of Newington College; Since 2019	Succeeded by Incumbent
