= Mervyn Austin =

Australian academic (1913–1991)

Mervyn Austin AM
- Born: 1913; Melbourne
- Died: 1991 (aged 77–78); Western Australia
- Education: Melbourne Grammar School; University of Melbourne; University of Oxford
- Occupations: Headmaster; University Professor

Mervyn Neville Austin (1 August 1913 – 11 June 1991) was an Australian headmaster and professor.

== Early life ==
Austin was born in Ascot Vale, Victoria, Australia, and was the second of four sons. Mervyn's father was James William Ashworth Austin, a real-estate agent. His mother was Jane Elizabeth.

From 1927 to 1931, Austin was a student at Melbourne Grammar School. For three years, he was a member of the school's 1st XI cricket side and was captain in his final year. He was a resident of Trinity College within the University of Melbourne and graduated as a Bachelor of Arts. In 1936 he was elected Victorian Rhodes Scholar and in 1937 entered Christ Church, Oxford.

While at the University of Oxford, Austin won a Blue in cricket as a right-hand batsman, bowling leg-break, and googly. He was later awarded a Master of Arts, in 1943, and a Bachelor of Divinity from the University of London.

== Career ==
During World War II, Austin enlisted in Melbourne and served as a flying officer with the RAAF., including flying Mosquito night-fighters in RAAF 456 Squadron in the UK. Upon his return to Australia in 1946, he was appointed senior classics master at his old school. After the war, he obtained a lectureship at the University of St Andrews, Scotland.

=== Headmaster ===
From 1950 until 1951 Austin was the headmaster of Newington College in Sydney.

=== Professor ===
Austin then served as the Professor of Classics and Ancient History at the University of Western Australia (UWA) from 1952 until 1978 and was chairman of the Professorial Board in 1963 and 1964. After his retirement from the university, he was appointed emeritus professor and was the Warden of Convocation from 1980 until 1982. A trust funds a bursary for students of Ancient Greek in memory of Austin's considerable contributions to the study of Greek, the classics and ancient history at UWA. This has now been converted to support a fund for visiting lecturers.

== Honours ==
Austin was made a Member of the Order of Australia (AM) during 1981 in recognition of his service to education.

== Publications ==
- An ignorant man thinking: essays and addresses (1966)

== Bibliography ==
- D. S. Macmillan, Newington College 1863-1963 (Syd, 1963)
- P. L. Swain, Newington Across the Years 1863-1998 (Syd, 1999)

Preceded by Philip Le Couteur	Headmaster; Newington College; 1950-1951	Succeeded by Lawrence Pyke
