= Oxley College (Burradoo) =

Location
- Burradoo, New South Wales; Australia; 34°29′56″S 150°23′29″E

Information
- Type: Independent school
- Motto: Latin: Patientia et Fortitudine (Patience and fortitude)
- Denomination: Non-denominational
- Founded: 1983; 43 years ago
- Chair of the Board of Governors: Jane Crowley
- Head of College (K–12): Mark Case
- Head of Senior School: Tristan Bevan
- Head of Junior School: Heidi Shvetsoff
- Years: P–12
- Gender: Co-educational
- Enrolment: 838 (2022)
- Website: www.oxley.nsw.edu.au

Oxley College is an independent school located in Burradoo, New South Wales, Australia.

== History ==
Oxley College was founded in 1983 as part of a non-profit project by the local community. A$600,000 (equivalent to $2,377,587 in 2022) building grant was provided by the Commonwealth Schools Commission, and local investment brought the total funding to $1 million. The college had an initial enrolment of 24 students, with a goal of enrolling 350 students within a few years of opening. The college takes its name from Australian explorer, John Oxley.

== Description ==
The school is a non-denominational independent school. It is a member of the Round Square network of schools.

The school motto is Patientia et Fortitudine, meaning "Patience and fortitude".

The school has a house system, with each house being named after Australians who were pioneers in their field:

- Dobell, after artist Sir William Dobell (1899–1970)
- Durack, after Olympic swimmer Sarah Durack (1889–1956)
- Florey, after scientist Howard Florey (1898–1968)
- Mawson, after geologist and Antarctic explorer Sir Douglas Mawson (1898–1958)
- Monash, after military leader Sir John Monash (1865–1931)
- Oodgeroo, after Aboriginal poet Oodgeroo Noonuccal (1920–1993)

== See also ==
- List of non-government schools in New South Wales
