= Tony Rae =

Australian educator (1927–2000)

Tony Rae AM
- Born: 8 July 1927; Sydney, Australia
- Died: 11 October 2000 (aged 73); London, England
- Education: The Scots College; University of Sydney; University of New England
- Occupations: Former Headmaster Newington College; Former chairman Headmasters' Conference of the Independent Schools of Australia
- Spouse: Lesley Rae née Lehfeldt
- Children: Two sons, including Stephen Rae, and one daughter
- Parent: S H Rae

Anthony James Morell Rae AM (1927-2000) was an Australian-born headmaster of a GPS School and chairman of the Headmasters' Conference of the Independent Schools of Australia.

== Early life ==
Tony Rae (the familiar form was part of his persona) was educated at The Scots College and graduated from the University of Sydney with a Master of Arts and Diploma of Education. He completed a Master of Education at the University of New England.

== Teaching career ==
Rae began his teaching career as a schoolmaster in 1948 at his alma mater, Scots, and spent four years there before teaching English in England and Canada. He returned to Scots in 1956 and in 1959 he was appointed Deputy Headmaster at Toowoomba Grammar School. In 1964 he moved to Trinity Grammar School, Summer Hill as a housemaster and later served as Senior Master from 1966 until 1968. James Wilson Hogg MBE, then the Headmaster of Trinity, wrote of him: "He was of formidable stature, tall and striking looking, a headmasterly figure long before headmastership. He habitually moved with a measured pace, gravely and with dignity." Albury Grammar School (now The Scots School Albury) appointed him as Head in 1969.

== Headmaster ==
In 1972, Rae returned to Sydney as Headmaster of Newington College. In Our Proper Concerns: A History of the Headmasters' Conference of the Independent Schools of Australia, Wilson Hogg says that, "His was an imaginative appointment. Despite the fine qualities of such headmasters as Lawrence Pyke and Douglas Trathen, the school had been passing through a protracted period of uncertainty and difficulty ... a decade before Tony Rae's assumption of office no one would have suspected that Newington would emerge in the eighties as a leading school in the arts; notably in drama, and pre-eminently in music." It was not just the arts that prospered during Rae's leadership. In 1992, for instance, Newington teams won all eight summer sporting premierships in the GPS competition: 1st/2nd basketball, 1st/2nd cricket, 1st/2nd tennis, 1st/2nd rowing eights – a record never before achieved by any school. Rae retired from Newington in 1993. Robert Buntine, his deputy of longstanding who had acted as head during his sabbaticals, was appointed as acting headmaster of Newington until Michael Smee OAM was appointed to the position mid-way through 1994.

== Honours ==
On 26 January 1992, Rae was made a member of the Order of Australia for "service to education as headmaster of Newington College and through the Association of Independent Schools".

Preceded by Rev Douglas Trathen	Headmaster; Newington College; 1972-1993	Succeeded by Michael Smee OAM
