= Old King's School, Parramatta =

Old King's School
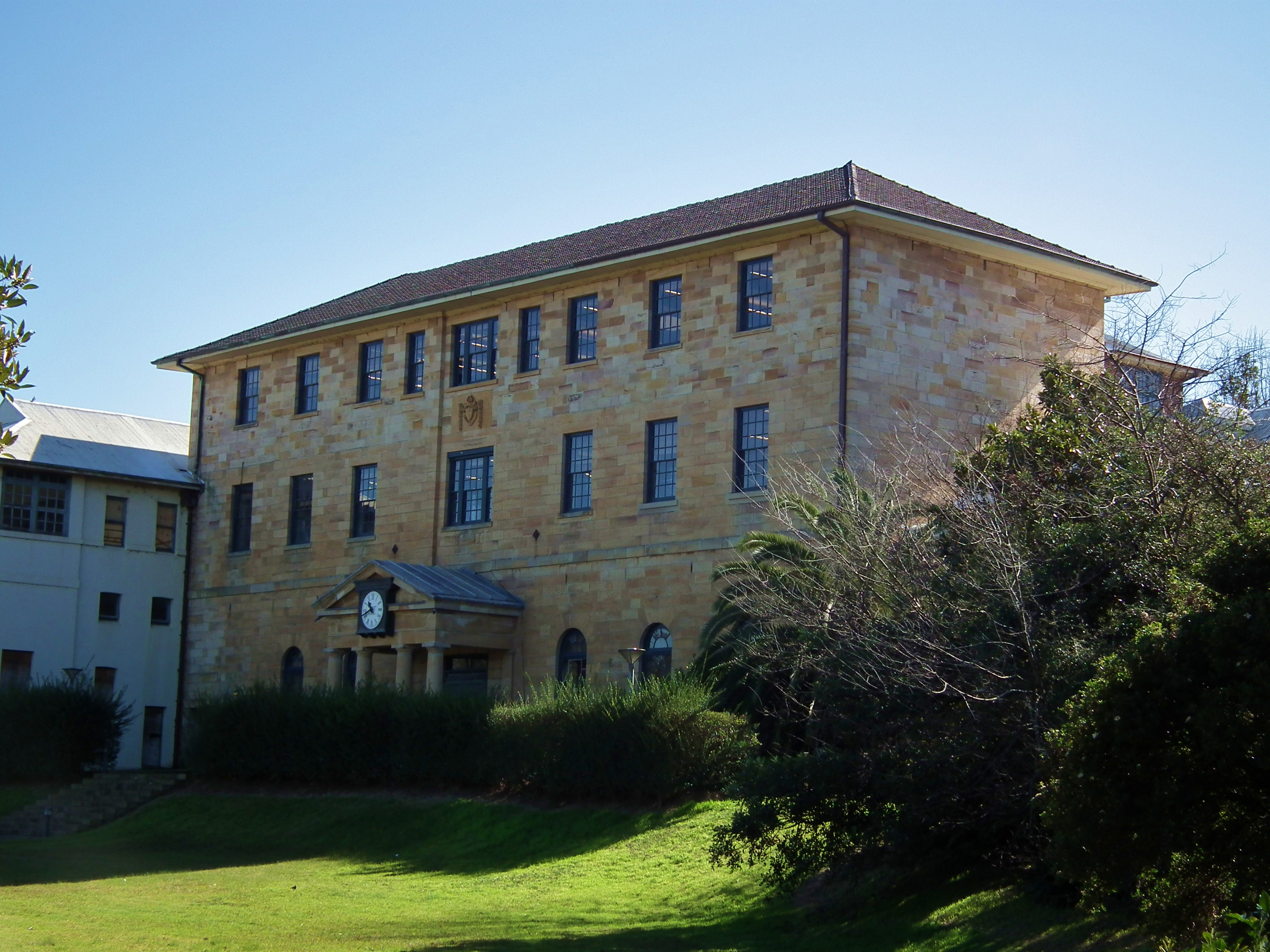

- Location within Sydney Location within Australia
- 33°48′35″S 151°00′07″E
- Location: O'Connell Street, Parramatta, City of Parramatta, New South Wales, Australia

History
- Built: 1833–

Site notes
- Architect(s): Various including Ambrose Hallen; Blacket Brothers; Moorhouse & Isaacs; Power Adam & Munnings
- Owner: NSW Department of Health

New South Wales Heritage Register
- Official name: Marsden Rehabilitation Centre Group; The Kings School (former); The Old King's School; Former King's School; Laurel House
- Type: State heritage (complex / group)
- Designated: 2 April 1999
- Reference no.: 826
- Type: Hospital
- Category: Health Services
- Builders: Various including C. A. Millyard; W. Noller

The Old King's School is a heritage-listed former campus of The King’s School, rehabilitation centre and office complex at O'Connell Street, Parramatta, Sydney, New South Wales, Australia. It was designed by various architects, including Ambrose Hallen, Blacket Brothers, Moorhouse & Isaacs and Power Adam & Munnings, and built by various contractors including C. A. Millyard and W. Noller. It is also known as The Old King's School and part of the site as Laurel House. It is now the Bayanami Public School. It was added to the New South Wales State Heritage Register on 2 April 1999.

== History ==
=== Aboriginal and early colonial use ===
Research has demonstrated that the presence of large and cohesive Aboriginal groups in the township of Parramatta represented a conspicuous and enduring aspect of the post-colonial periods of Parramatta's development. Parramatta was their traditional hunting and fishing grounds and this aspect of traditional use can be interpreted still in Parramatta Park through features such remnant indigenous plantings, scarred trees and the proximity to the Parramatta River and riverine features such as the anabranch of the Crescent and the "Island", a billabong type feature near the George Street gatehouse.

Part of the site which the school was to occupy had previously been part of the Government Farm at Parramatta.

The site which the school was to occupy comprised just over 2.4 hectares (6 acres) of a grant of 42 hectares (105 acres) which had been made to William Bligh by Governor King in 1806 just before Bligh took up office as Governor of New South Wales. The grant was one of three given to Bligh by King and was named Mount Betham. Its purpose was "for a private residence" at Parramatta. In return, on taking up office, Bligh granted land in the Colony to King. Little is known of the use to which Mount Betham was put by Bligh and later by those who administered his affairs.

However, a return of the lands held by the Governor in 1807 records that of the 544 hectares (1,345 acres) which comprised his three grants, there were only 10 hectares (25 acres) under cereal cultivation, one-half hectare (one acre) of orchard, 4.0 hectares (10 acres) fallow and 530 hectares (1,309 acres) in pasture. An 1811 map of Mount Betham shows part of the area as "under cultivation".

In 1811 "the Farm called Mount Betham, situated near Parramatta, fit for the establishment of a Dairy and Garden" was advertised to let. The outcome of the advertisement is not known. In 1814 Governor Macquarie alerted the British government to a "violation of Standing Orders" and suggested that Bligh be asked to surrender his lands. In 1819, on instructions from London, Macquarie issued an order that Bligh's grant of Mount Betham be declared null and void. The lands were then divided and granted for other purposes.

That part of the Mount Betham grant which was later to be used for the King's School was granted to the Agricultural and Horticultural Society in the 1820s. During their occupation of the site the land had been cleared and fenced and the Society had erected suitable buildings, formed a water tank, trenched and manured and furnished the necessary stock for grafting "for the purposes of introducing the growth of the finest kind of fruit trees into the colony". The extent of the Society's buildings on the site is not known.

The Agricultural Society of NSW was formed on 5 July 1822 under the patronage of Governor Brisbane, and its early office-holders were powerful citizens in Parramatta. The first president was Sir John Jamison of Regentville. Interests of the large landholders who had amassed enormous acreages through Government grants and personal fortunes were protected by the Society. The Society said that poor moral standards stood more in the way of agricultural success than lack of capital or decent land. The Society appeared to foster God-fearing beliefs but in fact its philosophy was economic rationalism. In 1824 the Society held its first show at Parramatta, which was a great success.

Governor Brisbane was a president of the Society and in the 1820s granted an experimental garden at Parramatta for the promulgation of various species of plants and trees for scientific research. The Horticultural Society was a separate body, becoming united with its Agricultural counterpart in 1826, under the leadership of Sir John Jamison. An 1828 article in a magazine called "The Blossom" alludes to a certain amount of criticism by the horticulturally inclined of this leadership but Jamison was a "mover" and had managed to organise a committee of management for the Society's garden in Parramatta (on this site), something not previously achieved. In 1832 the trees and plants so carefully nurtured in the garden were put up for sale and it seemed the Society had become more festive than practical. The Sydney Gazette put the blame on the Society's neglect of small settlers. The Society disbanded in 1836.

=== The King's School ===
By the 1830s private nurseries had been established and their task was effectively over. In January 1833 the Agricultural and Horticultural Society offered the land which they had occupied for a nursery on the north side of the river as a site for the school. The "house and ground lately in possession of the Agricultural and Horticultural Society" was officially handed over to Mr Forrest, the first master of The King's School on 2 January 1834.

Plans for establishments of higher education to be known as 'King's Schools' in New South Wales emanated from Archdeacon William Broughton, himself a former scholar of The King's School in Canterbury, England. His plan was to have day boys at Sydney and boarders and day boys at Parramatta.

The schools were to provide "a good classical, scientific and religious education to the sons of parents in the middle and higher ranks of life". There would be no religious tests but the instruction would be Anglican. The building at Parramatta would be paid for by the Colonial Treasury but should be of the "plainest and most economical description".

The education offered by the Kings School has remained true to this original ambition to provide instruction in the Classics, science and religion, and the school today continues a strong tradition in the Classics. The original masculine, sportsmanlike, even spartan character of the school has also continued, and the school retains its traditional links with major pastoral districts in NSW and Queensland such as western New South Wales, southern Queensland and the Hunter Valley from where many of the school boarders come.

Robert Forrest was recommended to the Colonial Office for the Headmastership of The King's School by Bishop of London Charles James Blomfield. He was appointed and arrived in Sydney in January 1832. The King's School was opened in temporary rented quarters at "Harrisford" in Parramatta in February 1832 with three day boys. By the end of the year there were 41 boarders and 12 day boys enrolled and additional cottages were rented for the boarders.

The Trustees of the Clergy and School Lands' Corporation who administered church property at this period commissioned John Verge to prepare plans for the School at Parramatta. In December 1832 Verge forwarded two designs for the school, one Gothic and one Grecian. The estimated cost of both was in excess of £3500. These were deemed too expensive.

However, the Archdeacon and his fellow trustees were not unmindful of the connection between the architectural style of a building and the status of the activities it contained. They wrote to the Colonial Secretary pointing out the need for "some architectural pretension to vaunt the importance of education". The matter was referred to the Colonial Architect, Ambrose Hallen in which he criticised Verge's plans and then submitted plans of his own with an estimated cost of £4000, considerably in excess of all previous plans. John Verge was paid for his designs but as these do not survive it is not known to what extent, if any, these influenced Hallen's subsequent design.

Tenders were called for the construction of the school in October and November 1833 for a plain building estimated to cost £2000. In January 1835 Ambrose Hallen was replaced as Colonial Architect by Mortimer Lewis. The building was completed for occupation in January 1836.

In 1836 the school comprised the two-storey main building with a shingle roof and two single-storey wings, that on the east for the accommodation of the Headmaster and that on the west for various domestic offices. The main building comprised two large rooms on the ground floor supported by a transverse corridor, with both rooms floored with stone slabs.

The room on the eastern end served as the schoolroom and that on the western end as the dining room, with a flight of stone stairs leading to the two dormitories above. Rooms which may have formed part of the west wing included the housekeeper's room, closet, kitchen, scullery, storeroom, larder and servants' quarters. There is also reference to a back stair and to a "court" (presumably at the back of the building flanked by other out-buildings). A covered way round the court had wooden columns and shingles. Also included among the out-buildings were water closets and privies.

A 30-centimetre (12 in) hammer-dressed drain was provided from the pipes of the water closets and privies and the main drain was carried 9.1 metres (30 ft) beyond the building. Washing facilities were primitive. The boys washed in a wooden tub at the back door and other ablutions were carried out in the river. Water for domestic use in the school came from the river and was stored in an underground brick tank 5 metres (16 ft) in diameter and 5 metres (16 ft) deep with domed top (this is located under the floor of the later dining hall just in front of the stage in what is now the NSW Heritage Office's library). The earliest known illustration of the school, painted in c. 1840, shows two buildings to the north-east of the headmaster's residence which may be stables and privies.

Little is known of any additions or alterations to the school buildings in the period from 1836 until its closure in July 1864. In 1838 the salary for the Headmaster provided by the government was discontinued and from that date the school had to be self-funding. W. W. Simpson was declared bankrupt in 1842 after a scarlet fever epidemic had temporarily closed the school with a consequent loss of income from school fees. The school re-opened with only twelve pupils but revived by the end of the decade with about sixty boarders enrolled. By 1856 substantial sums were required for additions and repairs to the school. The government were petitioned by the parents for assistance but were refused on the basis that government assistance had ceased in 1838.

William Branwhite Clarke, MA of Cambridge was clergyman, headmaster of The King's School, a poet and a renowned geologist. In 1841 Clarke founded in Sydney, the Church of England Clerical Book Society which, due to his generosity, possessed the largest collection of scientific books and journals in Australia. Clarke presented a lecture to this Society in October 1841, which had considerable appeal and influence on school master, William Woolls. The lecture was a formal affair, attended by his Lordship the Bishop. Clarke chose his topic, "The Legitimate Objects and Benefits of Natural History and Science". A full account of it was published in The Sydney Morning Herald.

James Walker, described by William Woolls as "one of the most learned men who ever came to the colonies", was an Oxford MA, had been chaplain at George Town, Van Diemen's Land, before Broughton in 1843 appointed him to the new incumbency of Marsfield and the headmastership of The King's School. Walker had studied botany in Europe, but neither published, wrote, described any species, assembled any collection, or performed any task by which posterity is able to judge the quality of any botanical labour he undertook. Walker's stay in Parramatta was not long. He left in 1847 to become the rector of St. Luke's at Liverpool. But his stay was long enough to introduce a new vision and dimension to school master William Woolls' life. IT was from the Walker, Woolls said that he had "first imbibed a taste for Australian botany". Woolls would earn for himself a place among the distinguished Australian botanists of the 19th century.

The school grew in numbers during Frederick Armitage's time as Headmaster (1855–1862) and additions to the buildings were made. A two-storey addition was made on the north side of the main building and temporary classrooms were erected. The number of pupils enrolled rose to 100 boarders and 20 day boys. Additional accommodation had to be provided for the boarders in one of the master's homes.

At the same time, the school suffered financial problems and a decline in morale. A number of reasons appear to have caused this: a shortage of funds, its dilapidated buildings, the defection of some masters to other schools and competition from other educational establishments, the smaller proprietary schools being more popular in the 1860s than large institutions. The departure of Armitage is also seen as a loss.

On 10 June 1864 the roof of the school building fell in. The assistant master, L. J. Trollope, was unwilling to spend his own money on repairs and with his resignation The King's School closed. Bishop Barker asked George Fairfowl Macarthur, who had his own school, St Mark's Collegiate School at Macquarie Fields to take over the headmastership but he refused. However, in July 1868 Macarthur accepted the position on terms that gave him a virtual monopoly of authority. The school at Macquarie Fields then officially became the King's School until February 1869 when Macarthur and 38 pupils returned to the school buildings at Parramatta.

When the school re-opened at Parramatta the buildings had been put in a good state of repair with the aid of private contributions. A subscription list was opened in 1868 when funds were sought "for the restoration and improvement of the building" as well as for endowments and exhibitions. This initial arrangement was formalised in the establishment of the school council in 1870.

When re-opened the dormitories on the upper floors of the main building had been partitioned to form four rooms each with twenty beds, the stone flagged floors on the ground floor had been removed (to provide flooring for racquet courts) and replaced with wooden flooring and the stone staircase boxed in. A large water tank was installed in the roof to which water was pumped up from the large water tank at the west end of the building. In 1874 two allotments of land on the Victoria Road frontage were purchased and added to the school site.

Between 1879–1881 the first substantial addition to the main building was built. This construction consisted of two additional floors superimposed on the two storey stone addition which had been made to the north side of the main building between c. 1855–1860. The addition was constructed of weatherboard with a balcony on the norths side and west end. On the upper floor the southern side of this extension was carried through, under the roof of the main building, emerging in the form of a large dormer window above the portico. This most unusual wooden extension to the main stone building remained in place until the 1920s. The idea of building a chapel was also mooted at this time but did not eventuate during Macarthur's headmastership. This 1879–81 addition was designed by John Horbury Hunt.

Sporting activities were also considerably developed largely due to the enthusiasm of W. R. Burkitt. Rugby was introduced in 1870, the first tennis courts were constructed and the playing field in Parramatta Park was levelled, all with the assistance of boys from the school. There is little evidence of any significant attempt at landscape design in the grounds. The dominant landscape feature was the school itself in its setting.

The Chapel was opened in February 1889. It was built in the Moorish Gothic style (located where now lies the present Heritage Office carpark). A second storey was added to the headmaster's residence and completed in the same year by Blacket Bros. Other additions included a carpenter's shop (1887), a new cottage hospital and gymnasium (1886) and a new system of lavatories and showers (1888). By 1889 there were 138 boarders and 34 day-boys at the school.

The future of the school was seriously considered during this time so much so that "draft plans for rebuilding of the school" were furnished by the architectural firm of Sulman and Power to the Council of The King's School. It is, however, not known if these plans were of the original buildings or for a new school on a new site. In 1893 negotiations began to obtain land on the west side of Parramatta Park as a site for the school and in 1894 to purchase the area as a permanent play ground, but these floundered due to public opposition.

The firm of Blacket Bros had already undertaken work at the school when they designed the second floor addition to the headmaster's residence in 1889. The new dining hall was built on the site of the original single storey west wing and was constructed immediately abutting the main building. Dormitories on the upper floors provided additional accommodation for boarders. Other works carried out by this firm included designs for a house for Lot 5 (on Victoria Road) for Mr Coombes in 1899; designs for a house for Mr Longe in 1902; and estimates, designs and calling tenders for a proposed riverfront reclamation. In 1907 the Council terminated Blacket's appointment. After some wrangling Blacket accepted £50 in full settlement of the fees due to him. He had not received any payment from the Council for some years.

It is probable that Blacket was responsible the construction of two other buildings on the site. These were the armoury building with museum and science room above, to the west of the dining hall, built in 1902 and a building to the north of the armoury, north-west of the dining hall. The exact date of construction of this building is not known. It has been identified in photographs taken in the period 1902-1908.

In 1892 Ring's Bridge was built to extend O'Connell Street over the Parramatta River, adjoining the school to the west. The bridge allowed for flood flows to flow under it up to the extent of the large plane (Platanus × hispanica) trees that still exist in O'Connell Street today. Up until the construction of the new concrete O'Connell Street Bridge in 1961 flood flows travelled under Ring's Bridge and across the King's School oval landscape.

The vegetated island in the middle of the Parramatta River fronting the school, shown on early paintings of the site, remained until the late 1800s when a bridge was constructed connecting it to the mainland of the school site.

In December 1908 J. W. Hill was appointed as the school's architect and served until October 1913. In 1908 a library was constructed between the dining hall and the armoury block, filling in the gap between the two other additions to the river frontage. In 1909 the dining hall was extended 10–12 metres (33–39 ft) to the north with classrooms above.

Urinals and other facilities were built to the north of the armoury in 1910 within the courtyard area formed by the new buildings. The new buildings appeared as obvious additions, each of a different but rather unimpressive design. The major addition to the school's sporting and recreational facilities at this period was the construction of the swimming baths in 1908. In 1916 the Walter and Eliza Hall Hospital was constructed.

The next major period of expansion for the school in terms of its building stock took place in the 1920s. Major alterations and additions were made to the main building; extensions were built on to the west side of the Dining Room block and at the south end of the Dining Hall; and a new building was constructed with classrooms and other facilities, completing the west side of the courtyard formed by the Dining Hall and the other early 1900s additions.

The most significant of these works in terms of the original school were the alterations and additions to the main two-storey stone building carried out in 1924. The architects for these works were the firm of F. Moorhouse & R. M. Isaacs and the builder C. A. Millyard. An additional storey in stone was added to the main building, removing the timber additions on the north side and the original roof. An extension on the north side with balconies was also added. On the ground floor the extension provided accommodation for masters' rooms and monitors; at the mezzanine level (between the ground and first floor levels of the original building) a sick room, casualty room, matron's bedroom and sitting room; on the first floor for masters' rooms and the sergeant's bedroom and on the second floor for box rooms and other space, to be subdivided as required. In the original building the first and second floors were for use as classrooms. New frames and sashes for almost all of the windows and new doors were provided for the main building in this major overhaul. Associated with these works were alterations to the dining hall to provide dormitory accommodation on the upper floors.

A new gymnasium was built in 1921 on the site of the earlier structure. At the same time the filter beds for the swimming pool were converted into dressing rooms for masters and visiting teams and the top of the structures was modified to provide a spectators' gallery. In 1922 the Chapel extension was dedicated as a memorial to the Old Boys who died in World War I. In 1923 a block along the western side of the courtyard formed by the early 1900s additions was completed, containing three classrooms, a book room, fiction library, dental surgery and tuck shop. The Dining Hall was also remodelled to provide dormitories with a glassed in balcony on the west side. In 1929 two Five Courts were built on the western boundary of the site, to the south of the gymnasium, adjacent to O'Connell Street.

The move to accommodate boarders in other premises had begun in 1909 when Junior House had moved to a house on May's Hill in Parramatta Park, moving again to Old Government House in 1910. Two Senior School boarding houses outside the school were also established, "Macarthur House" opened in 1911 and Broughton House in Thomas Street Parramatta. In 1922 "Brookside" at Westmead was purchased and opened as a house for boys aged 13–14 years, renamed Thomas House. By 1926 there were 366 boarders at the school, more than double the number in 1910. The number of day boys remained stable at about seventy.

Although various of its architects had proposed to the Council that the school buildings be totally remodelled, none of these suggestions had ever been adopted. In the 1930s for the first time in its history, a masterplan was developed for the whole site.

Only one major aspect of this master plan eventuated. This was the construction of the new dormitories on the O'Connell Street frontage, known as School Houses, Baker and Forrest. The building was ready for occupation in 1934 and the architects were Power Adam & Munning.

The Walter and Eliza Hall hospital was converted into two flats for married masters when the school hospital transferred to Thomas House and two modern classrooms were erected just inside the northern boundary of the site. The school's major problem was that of the inadequacy of the site. Under Herbert Hake's guidance plans matured for the removal of the school to a new site. In 1954 "Gowan Brae" was purchased and the next year the preparatory school was established there. In 1962 the first part of the Senior School moved to the new site and by 1968 the relocation of the whole school had been effected. The Chapel was dismantled and moved to the new site.

=== Marsden Rehabilitation Centre ===
The old school site and buildings was sold to the New South Wales Department of Health in 1964 for use as a training centre for people with an intellectual disability known as Marsden Rehabilitation Centre. The interiors of the buildings were considerably adapted and remodelled for this purpose in 1968–1969. The main additions to the buildings on the site since its acquisition by the Health Department were the boiler house to the north of the kitchen wing built in 1971 and Jennings Lodge at the intersection of O'Connell Street and Victoria Road.

The Marsden Rehabilitation Centre moved onto the site in 1972. The former Headmasters Quarters building was renamed Laurel House and used as the offices for the Marsden Industries Sheltered Workshop. The sheltered workshop also occupied the first and second floors of the Main Building until 1982 when it closed down.

The ground floor of the Main Building became an auditorium with the installation of raked seating. It was used as a venue for functions and shows performed by the clients of the Marsden Rehabilitation Centre. In the late 1970s Les Girls staged a performance for the Marsden Rehabilitation Centre and from the mid-1970s to the mid-1980s it was in regular use as the main theatre space for the Q Theatre, Penrith.

In 1988 the southern facade of the Main Building was used in the mini-series "Captain Cook" to represent the Southampton Naval Hospital.

Following the closure of the Marsden Industries Sheltered Workshop in 1982, the Main Building was used as activity spaces for the day programs of the Marsden Rehabilitation Centre clients, and Laurel House became the offices of the Regional Diagnostic and Assessment Centre for People with an Intellectual Disability.

Between 1990 and 2001 Laurel House was occupied by the Department of Community Services and from April 2001 was used by the Department of Ageing, Disability and Home Care as offices.

Following the recommendations of the Richmond Report in 1985, the services of the Marsden Rehabilitation Centre were gradually wound back and most of its clients were moved to alternative community-based living arrangements. Where previously the centre accommodated approximately 150 clients, it had only 25 by 2003. As a result, many of the buildings became redundant.

In 1995 a Conservation Management Plan was prepared by Peddle Thorp for the NSW Department of Health and in April 1999 the whole site of the former Kings School was listed on the State Heritage Register as a place of state significance.

=== Recent uses ===
In January 2001 approval was granted for conservation, restoration and adaptive re-use of the Main Building and the former Headmasters Quarters (Laurel House) for use by the NSW Heritage Office. The work was undertaken by Tanner and Associates and was completed in February 2003.

The rehabilitation centre closed in c. 2004. The former Headmaster's Quarters was used as professional offices and the Main Building by the NSW Heritage Office (later the Heritage Division of the Office of Environment and Heritage).

In c. 2011, the then-Labor state government negotiated the sale of 12% of the site to the Roman Catholic Diocese of Parramatta for $5.5 million, with the funds intended to go towards a major new arts precinct for Western Sydney to be established on the site. However, after the Labor government was defeated at the 2011 election, the incoming Liberal-National government cancelled the arts precinct in September 2011, labelling it an "unfunded promise".

In 2018, the O'Connell Street Public School opened on the site, with adaptive reuse of the historic buildings. The school name changed in September 2019 to "Bayanami Public School".

== Description ==
=== Buildings ===
Main School Building

Original two-storey stone building and Greek Doric style portico. Dressed sandstone walls. Terracotta tiled hip roof. Multi-paned double-hung timber windows.

Additions to Main School Building

Two-storey well detailed brickwork with brick arches to the north.

Headmasters Residence

Two-storey structure with verandahs. Cast iron columns and balustrading. Dressed sandstone ground-floor walls. Original timber windows, doors and shutters. Stone flagging of ground-floor verandahs.

Dining Hall

Constructed of brick, re-roofed in with a single-gambrel roof. Multi-paned timber windows.

Reference Library and Museum

Two-storey brick building with flat stone pilasters dividing the windowless upper floor into three bays. Stone plinth and window lintels and rusticated stone arch to former doorway.

Armoury Block

Three-storey brick building. Gambrel roof with sheet metal roofing. Dark red brickwork with full-height brick pilasters and decorative light red brick lintels cornices. Sandstone moulding at base of pilasters.

Classroom Block

Two-storey rendered brick building with neo-classical detailing. Terracotta tiles roof. Timber louvres to the gable. Colonnade at the ground floor.

Stores

Two-storey L-shaped plan now with skillion roof.

Dining Hall Annexe

One-storey skillion abutted to west wall of dining hall. Brick walls.

Kitchen and Kitchen Annexe

Three-storey red brick building with a gambrel roof. Double-hung windows. Annexe a one-storey brick addition.

Five Courts and Garages

Brick walls, metal clad skillion roof.

Gymnasium and Building/Pool

One-storey of rendered brick, terracotta tiled roof, multi-paned double-hung timber windows on upper floor.

Dormitories

Three-storeyed Georgian Revival style building with terracotta tiled roof, variegated face brickwork with sandstone string courses and other decorative features on the west facade. Dark red quoins, sills and head dressings enliven the facade. A clock tower projects through the roof above the central bay to O'Connell Street. Multi-paned double-hung timber windows. It is currently used as a campus of Parramatta Public School.

=== Landscape setting/grounds ===
The main landscape feature of the site is that its southern half is dominated by the Oval, the former Parade ground of the School, on a level terrace above the Parramatta River. The School era buildings are to the north of the Oval, and fill much of the rest of the block, with the exception of the St Patrick's Cathedral complex to the north-east.

The site includes a number of old and significant trees which relate to the occupation of the site by The Kings School (i.e. 1834–1968). There are 10 identified trees of regional or state significance: three London plane trees (Platanus × hispanica), two carob bean trees (Ceratonia siliqua) directly south-east and south-west of the main school block, possibly predating the school to the Horticultural Society period of the 1820s and certainly mid-late 19th century at the latest), one huge Morton Bay fig (Ficus macrophylla) growing on a sandstone retaining wall in the south-east corner above the Marsden Street weir road ramp, one hybrid kurrajong/Illawarra flame tree (Brachychiton populneus x B.acerifolius cv.), two huge camphor laurels at least from the 1880s from photographs near Marist Place (pedestrian path entry), and one cotton palm (Washingtonia robusta).

Other mature plantings southeast of the Head Master's cottage include a mature bull bay/evergreen magnolia (Magnolia grandiflora), laurustinus (Viburnum tinus), firethorn (Pyracantha angustifolia), large leafed Senecio (Senecio petasitis), Canary Island date palm (Phoenix canariensis), the latter having been relocated in 2002 from near the entry gates on Marist Place to the south side of the Main School building, on the eastern side of the portico. Further east of that shrubbery belt are a large mature laurustinus (Viburnum tinus), a mature crepe myrtle tree (Lagerstroemia indica), with Nile lilies (Agapanthus orientalis) and Cordyline sp. under it, a remnant grapefruit tree near the Marist Place fence (Citrus x paradisi cv. possibly 'Wheeny').

=== Modifications and dates ===
- Main School Building built 1836 (two storey), additional (third) storey added 1925, internal alterations 1970s and 2002
- Additions to Main School Building c. 1860 (two storey), *Horbury Hunt additions to north (four storeys, timber) and gable to south on sandstone facade (then two storey) built 1879–81*, added to in 1925 (to three storeys in sandstone facade to south, demolishing Horbury Hunt gable), fire stair c. 1970
- Headmasters residence built 1836, second storey added 1889, 1970s conversions, 2002 conversions
- Dining Hall built c. 1900, extended and re-roofed 1924
- Reference Library and Museum built 1908, ground floor altered c. 1970
- Armoury Block built 1902
- Classroom Block built 1923
- Stores built 1920s, toilets demolished 1970s
- Dining Hall Annexe built 1911 and converted to dorms c. 1925
- Kitchen and Kitchen Annexe built between 1902 and 1908
- Five Courts and Garages built in 1929, renovated 1970s
- Gymnasium and Building/Pool built 1921, second storey built 1940s
- Dormitories built 1934, renovated 1970s
- Horbury Hunt exhibition, Museum of Sydney, 2002
- 1892 Ring's Bridge built to extend O'Connell Street over the Parramatta River, adjoining the school to the west
- late 1800s The vegetated island in the middle of the Parramatta River fronting the school remained until the late 1800s, when a bridge was constructed connecting it to the mainland of the school site
- 1908 Swimming pool built on school grounds, shifting swimming races which were previously held in the river
- 1961 construction of the new concrete O'Connell Street Bridge

== Archaeology ==
The study area was originally occupied by the Dharug people. The European historical development of the site spans almost 200 years, from early agricultural activities in this area, followed by occupation of the site by the Agricultural and Horticultural Society (Australia's first) for the purposes of forming a nursery garden and introducing fruit tree species into the colony. The history of the site is dominated by the development of the King's School, one of the major educational institutions in NSW throughout much of the 19th and 20th centuries (operating from this site from 1836 to the 1960s).

The King's School, run by the Anglican Church, was the first large public boarding school (secondary) to be established in the colony of NSW, and developed to become one of Australia's notable private schools. The school was one of the large institutions which shaped both the urban form and cultural framework of the regional town of Parramatta in the early 19th century, and counts a number of notable Australians among its former students.

The potential archaeological resource at this site is very complex, with various phases of construction, expansion and demolition across the site, most of which occurred during the King's School phase. The King's School represented the dominant phase of development across the site and, subsequently, physical remains associated with this phase of development also dominate the potential archaeological resource at the site. The potential archaeological resource at the site may provide a tangible link to each phase of the historical development of the site. Investigation, analysis and interpretation of the potential archaeological remains across the site may provide information about the nature of the development and occupation of the site throughout the various phases of its history. Many of these remains would have potential to contribute substantial information to our understanding of the development and occupation of the site that could not be obtained from other sources, such as historical documentation. Owing to the continuous operation of the King's School on this site for 128 years, investigation of the remains of this occupation may provide a rare opportunity to investigate the development and changing operation of a major institution, allowing investigation of changes in material culture within the one context over time, including construction techniques, infrastructure technology, domestic and personal items of the inhabitants (students and staff), as well as developments or modifications in educational practices over time.

Archaeological evidence associated with the earliest phases of European occupation of this site (early agricultural activities of the Agricultural and Horticultural Society's occupation of the site) would be of high State significance for its ability to provide information about a poorly documented and understood phase of Parramatta and NSW's history. However, such evidence would be fragmentary at best, if it survives at all.

Archaeological evidence associated with the development and occupation of the King's School would also be of high State significance for its ability to provide information about a major institutional site over an extended period of time. Archaeological remains associated with the King's School would contribute to the historical significance of the site, providing a tangible link to this significant phase of the site's history, as well as information about the occupation and operation of the institution that could not be obtained from other sources.

Archaeological evidence associated with the development and occupation of the Marsden Rehabilitation Centre would be limited and would have little potential to provide information about the operation of this institution that could not be obtained from other sources. Archaeological remains associated with this phase of the site's history would have little or no significance.

== Heritage listing ==
The foreshore lands of the Marsden Rehabilitation Centre site are of significance at national, state and local levels, as:

- part of the territory of the Burramuttagal people
- part of the former Government Farms at Parramatta
- associated with the development of the horticultural industry and botanical exploration
- associated with important people and events in the development and settlement of Parramatta such as George Caley, Robert Brown and Francois Peron
- associated with the development of the setting for The King's School
- associated with the open space created by the natural flood zone along the Parramatta River

The major landscape significance of the site is the spatial relationship between the wall of the buildings and the river. The gracious setback of the buildings demonstrates the principle of picturesque siting, giving the building group a "prospect". This layout of the site greatly contributes to the understanding of the early development of Parramatta as an important centre in the Colony and the attitudes to particular landscape settings.

The site of the former King's School Parramatta is very important in the history of education in the state. The King's School occupied the site almost continuously from 1836 to 1964. It was the first large private boarding school run by the Anglican Church to provide secondary education, which was established in the colony of New South Wales. The school developed during its tenure on the site into one of Australia's notable schools and thus gave community status to Parramatta as a regional town/city in New South Wales. The growth of the school is evident in the relatively intact exterior fabric of the buildings.

Many buildings were the work of prominent Australian architects: Ambrose Hallen, Cyril Blacket and Power Adams & Munnings, the successors of the earlier firm of (John) Sulman and Power. The stonework of the original 1830s school building and its eastern wing is evidence of the relatively high level skills of the Scottish artisans who were brought to Australia following the depression in the British construction industry in the 1820s.

The site is one of two surviving examples along the Parramatta River of the picturesque siting principles of the 18th and 19th centuries by which large building groups were sited on the brow of a hill overlooking sloping land bordering a river. The site is evidence of the role of major social institutions in the evolution of the physical and cultural framework of the regional town of Parramatta during the nineteenth century. The site was under cultivation early in the colony's history and was used in the 1820s for the acclimatisation and development of exotic fruit trees when Australia's first Agricultural Society was formed in Parramatta (1822) and was given this land by its president, Governor Brisbane as an experimental garden to grow new varieties of plants and trees. A number of trees over 100 years old remain from the School gardens, some rare in Sydney, such as the carob bean tree, Ceratonia siliqua.

Marsden Rehabilitation Centre was listed on the New South Wales State Heritage Register on 2 April 1999.

== See also ==
- The King's School, Parramatta
