= Macarthur House =

Historic site in Sydney, New South Wales

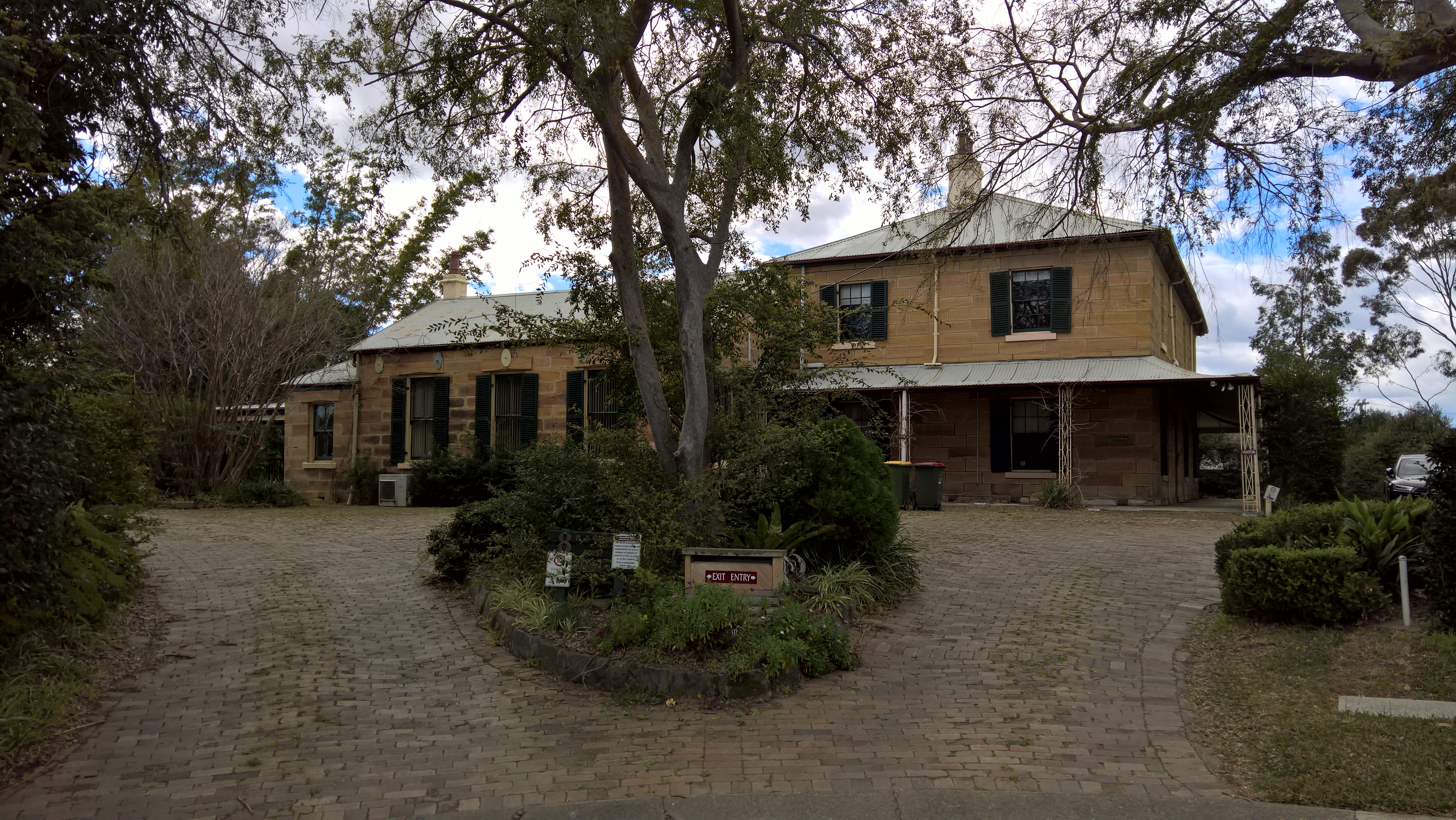
- Macarthur_House, Parramatta in 2019

- Location within Sydney Location within Australia
- 33.8118°S 151.0193°E
- Location: 8 Melville Street, Parramatta, Sydney, New South Wales, Australia

History
- Built: 1855–1856

Site notes
- Architect(s): James Houison (1850s house); Arthur William McKenzie Mowle (1923 wings); David Sheedy (1981-2 works)

New South Wales Heritage Register
- Official name: Macarthur House; Morton House; Pemberton Grange
- Type: state heritage (complex / group)
- Designated: 2 April 1999
- Reference no.: 50
- Type: House
- Category: Residential buildings (private)
- Builders: James Houison

Macarthur House is a heritage-listed former residence and school building and now offices at 8 Melville Street, Parramatta, Sydney, New South Wales, Australia. It was designed by James Houison (1850s house), Arthur William McKenzie Mowle (1923 wings) and David Sheedy (1981-2 works) and built from 1855 to 1856 by James Houison. It has also known as Morton House and Pemberton Grange. It was added to the New South Wales State Heritage Register on 2 April 1999.

== History ==
=== Aboriginal and early colonial use ===
The northern shore of the Parramatta River was originally inhabited by the Indigenous people of the Wallumedegal tribe, who spoke a dialect of the Darug language.

From the initial years of colonisation the region of Parramatta was a much sought-after area due to the rich soil in the area and its promising potential for farming and growing crops.

On 22 February 1791 Robert Webb, a seaman who arrived in Sydney on the "Sirius" with the First Fleet in 1788, was granted 60 acres on the north side of the Parramatta River by Governor Phillip, which included the location of the current Macarthur House. This was the first land grant on the river's north side and only the second land grant issued in Australia, the other being James Ruse's "Experiment Farm" grant on the opposite side of the river, which Phillip made on the same day. The extent of Webb's grant is traced today by the river frontage, Isabella Street, Webb/Morton Streets and approximately Macarthur Street. Webb had used much of his Parramatta land for farming before conveying his grant to Captain Thomas Melville for 100 pounds in 1794. Melville was master of the "Brittania", a convict transport of the Third Fleet that arrived in Sydney in 1791, and later of the "Speedy". His daughter, Jennett, married the surveyor George Evans (1780–1852) in 1798 in London, and Webb's grant was the bride's dowry. The couple arrived in Sydney in October 1802. Evans was initially given the position of store-keeper in charge of receipt and issue of grain at Parramatta, but in August 1803 was appointed acting surveyor-general in the absence of Charles Grimes who was on leave in England. Between 1804 and 1809 Evans farmed another grant at the Hawkesbury settlement. From 1809 he was again engaged by the government on surveying tasks and travelled widely and frequently. In September 1812 he was sent to Tasmania (Van Diemen's Land) and a sale notice in The Sydney Gazette 26 December 1812, 2 published about that time describing the Parramatta property as "garden, orchards" and "stabling".

In July 1815 Evans was required to return to Hobart and he remained there until 1817. In the interim, in November 1816, emancipist landholder Simeon Lord (who held a mortgage over Evans' property since 2/1804 and who had placed the 1812 sale notice, conveyed Webb's 60 acres, and the neighbouring grant of 30 acres originally made to John Irving, to George Thomas Palmer. Palmer (1784–1854) was son of the colony's Commissariat, John Palmer. He (George) joined the army in 1800, married Catherine Irene Pemberton in 1805 at Malta. The couple came to Sydney in 1806, with Palmer then a Lieutenant in the 61st Regiment with permission to settle as a free immigrant. Between 1813 and 1814 he was superintendent of government stock, and then developed (his Parramatta farm) "Pemberton Grange" from 1816. At Parramatta Palmer was a magistrate for many years, and was a member of the managing committee of the Female Factory in the late 1820s. The household at Pemberton Grange was above the bank of the river and south of Thomas Street. The farm's name honoured his wife's family. GT Palmer's father, John resided at Waddon Cottage on Irving's 30 acres immediately to Pemberton Grange's east. Waddon seems to have been developed about 1820 and was John's place of residence until his death in 1833. G. T. Palmer and family returned to England in January 1838 on the "Everetta". The household contents of Pemberton Grange were sold in January 1838 and the house put up for letting, together with Waddon Cottage. A detailed description of the hose and outbuildings was provided in the published letting notice. It stated the 90 acres had been divided into six paddocks, and "most of which have been under cultivation" and "being well-supplied with water it is admirably adapted for a homestead for the reception of cattle, previously to their being driven to the Sydney Market".

Pemberton Grange was conveyed in January 1838 to Captain John West, with the 18th Regiment of Foot, then stationed at Windsor, by way of a mortgage secured from West and repayable to Palmer in 1840. This arrangement suited both parties until 1851, when Captain West, then in England, and Palmer, having returned to New South Wales, having been staying at his station Ginninderra (near present-day Canberra and developed by Palmer from about 1826) since at least the mid-1840s, agreed to convey Pemberton Grange and the 90 acres to merchants Robert Campbell and John Campbell in trust. Palmer was related by marriage to the Campbell family in numerous ways. Pemberton Grange was tenanted by a number of different occupants between 1838 and 1855 before the land was subdivided.

The farm changed hands several times between 1794 and the 1850s before it was subdivided in 1855, continuing to be used for farming. During this period prior to 1855 the use or activities taken place within the precise location of the study area are unknown.

=== Construction of Macarthur House and residential use ===
From 1855, the 90 acres of Melville's former property was subdivided into 56 lots. The section that comprises the current study area was bought by John Morton Gould in July 1855. Soon after, he built a new home, which he was to name Morton House (now Macarthur House). This was the first known structural development in the study area.

The stone mansion is probably the finest "Georgian" structure of the mid-Australian Gold Rush period existing in the Commonwealth. It was erected in 1855–56, during the era when trains began to operate between Sydney and Parramatta (Parramatta Junction, near Granville). It was built on a large site, one of 56 lots, auctioned in July 1855. Parramatta lawyer, John Morton Gould, had purchased the site and commissioned the top colonial architect, James Houison, of Parramatta, to design the building and to supervise its erection.

In 1859 Gould's new home was placed on the market to be leased. In December 1862 Morton House was sold to Henry Harvey, a miller. It remained his place of residence until his death in 1874 and in that period it continued to be known as Morton House.

In April 1874 it was sold to the Rev. Thomas Spencer (T. S.) Forsaith. While Forsaith regularly relocated between different areas of Sydney to establish churches, he resided at Morton House at various times until his death in 1898. Under Forsaith's trustee, David Smart Walker of Walker Bros., house and estate agents, Morton House was occupied by various tenants between 1900 and 1910.

=== The King's School period ===
Morton House was acquired by Rev. Percy Stacy (P. S.) Waddy, headmaster of The King's School in 1910. Stacy Waddy was headmaster of the school from 1906 to 1916. His appointment in 1906 heralded a period of expansion and change for the school. By 1909 the numbers of day-boys and boarders had doubled in two years. He founded a junior school, set up the house system, amongst other innovations. With increasing enrolments, Waddy also purchased the nearby Newlands property, along with its 42 acres. Initially known as Farm House, renamed Broughton House (modern address 43A Thomas Street), Newlands was used also to provide agricultural training for the boys.

The formal entrance to Macarthur House in The King's School era commenced from Thomas Street with a semi-circular drive in front of the house. That public road had been extended west to intersect with Macarthur Street in 1890. The boys walked to the school. There was another entrance from Pemberton Street, which was most likely used for trade. The old carriage drive from the house to Morton Street and onto Victoria Road fell into disuse.

The boys moved into Macarthur House in 1911. A new dormitory for 30 boys had been built for them by March 1912, designed by local architect, James Whitmore Hill. It was built by the boys under the supervision of Hill and was relocated on completion of the new dormitory wing in 1923.

The Rev. Percy Stacy Waddy, resigning as headmaster in 1916 and leaving the school to enlist in the Australian Imperial Force (the School Council twice having refused him leave for such an undertaking), conveyed freehold title of Macarthur House to the school in 1916, after when it was used as one of the school's boarding houses and renamed "Macarthur House" in honour of the Rev. George Farfowl Macarthur who re-organised the school from 1856 to 1868 and a son of Hannibal Macarthur from the nearby estate, Vineyard (Rydalmere). It was also used for agricultural training.

A view of the house's west side from 1920 shows Forsaith's west wing and conservatory, built 1875, and two earlier pine trees (one a hoop pine, Araucaria cunninghamii; the other a Cook's pine, Araucaria columnaris). In 1924 electricity was installed, the property was sewered by installation of a septic tank and in August 1927 the property was attached to the Water Board's sewer.

Arthur William McKenzie Mowle was the school's architect for two-storey dormitory wings completed in 1923. A courtyard was between these and the house, with a shower block between.

While Broughton House (fmr. Newlands) and another school property in Sorrell Street were requisitioned in 1942 for use by the military forces as training centres, Macarthur House was not so-affected. It was used by the King's School for boarders' accommodation until 30 March 1964 when the school moved to the expansive new grounds and new buildings on the site of Gowan Brae, North Parramatta.

A large number of additions and outbuildings were built by the school and finally in 1965 it was sold for development, the outbuildings demolished and the land subdivided for cottages. The lot was c.11.5 acres, with some land having been taken for public roads. This area was subdivided into a housing estate in 1965/6 with allotments fringing the four sides of the historical land holding being in DP 223880, the inner area exclusive of the historic house in DP 224786, and the historic house and immediate surrounds in DP228839 (registered in March 1966). Gould Place and Melville Street and the public reserve to the west of Macarthur House were formed in these subdivisions.

The historic house was retained, but other buildings erected in The King's School era were demolished. This was undertaken by the estate developer, and not the later owner. While the historic house was protected from the demolition plans, it was prone to vandalism within two years of The King's School leaving the premises and the arrival of a new owner, between 1964 and 1966.

=== The Pike Family period ===
Richard Pike purchased the property after 1965 as well as an additional subdivided allotment to extend the curtilage of the house to Gould Place. Pike carried out a number of improvements to the King's School changes to the original house to keep them more in sympathy with the original Georgian design. Pike was a public high school teacher at the time, married to Dr Ruth Radcliffe (née Tarn) and with six children. He set about restoring the house with the limited funds available. At the time Pike had considered buying Elizabeth Farm House, which was also on the market, but settled on Macarthur House.

Pike was a lifetime member of the National Trust of Australia (NSW), which during the late 1960s and 1970s provided him assistance in his efforts to preserve the house. In 1967 the Trust included the house in its Register of Buildings of Outstanding Historic Interest, and it was classified by the Trust in 1976. Through the Trust, Pike was advised by architects, initially John Kenneth Noller, prior to 1969, then David Sheedy, and skilled tradesmen. An early setback was the outbreak of fire in 1969 in one of the rear wings, and much of the historic house was badly smoke and water-affected. The staircase and upstairs cedar-lined ceilings were charred badly. most of the major restoration works had been completed by 1975, with work then being undertaken on the kitchen/servants' east wing. In 1975, it appears that students from the University of Sydney undertook an archaeological investigation in two cisterns/wells in the northern courtyard of the house. While the actual results have not been identified, a summary of the excavation was placed in the newsletter of the Australian Society for Historical Archaeology.

The expense of restoring and maintaining the house was considerable and unsustainable, and by 1973 Pike was considering ways of generating income from the place. In 1973 he sought consent to use the house for wedding receptions. Parramatta Council fully supported Pike's work but refused consent for commercial use, citing strong objections from neighbouring residents, its location within a residential area and otherwise being contrary to the public interest. Council retained this policy into at least the 1990s. Pike subsequently, in 1973 and early 1974, tried to dispose of Macarthur House by sale at public auction. An interest was expressed by the Methodist Church with the plan to use the property as a retirement home. That was rejected by Parramatta Council and the option lapsed and the sale did not proceed). In 1974 the then Planning & Environment Commission placed an Interim Development Order (IDO) no. 23 (Parramatta) on the property. That IDO permitted use for "social functions" and Pike applied in 1976 for a wedding reception use, which again was strongly opposed by neighbours.

A temporary timber shed was built from 1975 onwards in stages to store building materials and provide a garage. The property was used as a family home until recent years when it was converted into professional office suites. As part of this change of use a small paved area was provided for car parking at the west of the building and toilets were provided in part of the kitchen wing.

In 1977 the IDO was amended to remove the "social functions" use and to included uses such as 'residential building; and "residential flat building" and allow subdivision (two allotments and one house on each). This change acknowledged both local community opposition to commercial activities and provided Pike scope to make economic use of the property. The amendment prohibited external alterations and additions to the house without Parramatta Council consent. In August 1980 Permanent Conservation Order no. 50 under the NSW Heritage Act 1977 was placed on the property, and the place was subject to the consent authority of the Heritage Council of NSW.

In c. 1980 a new round of conservation works was commenced, including constructing a new attached east wing, approved by the Heritage Council in July 1981. This wing comprised a kitchen, breakfast room and storage, and attic room for a housekeeper. It was designed by David Sheedy in a Victorian style to match adjoining like fabric. It is likely that the construction of the new wing re-used the dressed stone blocks of the 1850s kitchen wing that was demolished, as well as other stone blocks brought in from elsewhere. The east return of the front veranda and flagging was reconstructed, albeit on a new alignment. This project was completed in 1982.

About 1984 the roof was sheathed in corrugated zinc-coated steel. This proved problematic, as a private building covenant had been placed on the subdivision in the mid-1960s that prohibited such practice. In the early 1990s Heritage Council approvals for the use as professional offices (September 1990) and as a boarding house (October 1991). In 1994 the Heritage Council approved use of the 1870s west wing as a preschool. In 1997 the Heritage Council approved a proposal to construct a caretaker's cottage on the site. This approval was never activated, so no other house was ever built on site. Parramatta Council approved two development approvals in 1997 for a new two storey building (residence) on site – but neither were acted on. In April 2016 Richard Pike, then aged 93, sold Macarthur House to the current owners.

== Offices ==
As at 2019, the house is used as serviced offices.

== Description ==
The main house is a large Old Colonial Georgian style sandstone house of symmetrical design but has had a two-storey matching bay added to the east end. A stone flagged verandah to the ground floor has bellcast iron roof supported by slender cast columns.

There is a one-storey stone addition with carved bargeboards on one side. All internal joinery is of polished cedar including the original geometric stair, one chimneypiece and some later marble and cast iron chimneypieces.

A stone ballroom with Gothic details, forming a separate single-storey wing was added on the west end in 1870, and to the east are the remains of the kitchen wing. The kitchen wing was substantially altered by the Kings School after 1916. It was reconstructed to a form similar to its original appearance with sandstone walls by the owner in 1981. The windows are generally 12 pane colonial Georgian pattern, all shuttered and doors are four paneled. Internally there is a fine cedar joinery throughout including a graceful geometric stair with marble tiled hallway.

The single storey wing at the rear on the western end of the house is built with timber trussed gable roof, diagonally boarded timber ceiling and a small room and porch at the north. This wing was built as a chapel in 1875 and is virtually unaltered.

The shed outbuilding is a small building which was built in stages by the present owner after 1975. It was built as a store shed and car garage. It is of rough timber construction with a skillion corrugated roof.

When purchased by a private owner in 1966, the house was in poor physical condition following many years of neglect. A considerable amount of expenditure was made by the owner in an attempt to restore the building to its former grandeur.

=== Modifications and dates ===
- 1875: a stone ballroom with Gothic details and a conservatory, forming a separate single-storey wing was added on the west end and to the east are the remains of the 1850s kitchen wing.
- 1911: new timber-framed dormitory built (later relocated).
- post 1916: the kitchen wing was substantially altered by the Kings School.
- 1923: timber framed dormitory relocated to eastern side of the rear (north) side of the house, and a new 2 storey brick dormitory wing built to the house's north-west, connected to its rear via a single storey brick shower block.
- 1931: new electrical wiring system installed.
- 1933: new hot water system installed.
- 1934: renovations and repairs undertaken (details not known) – it is believed these included constructing a 2-storey eastern weatherboard and stone addition to the main front of the house, which was initially beneath a skillion roof extension to the eastern side of the original hipped main roof. 1967 photos show at least the front section of this addition was clad in sandstone, and that the rear first floor northern elevation of it was weatherboard.
- 1935: brick paving of rear courtyard
- 1950s–60s: additional buildings built to north and north-east of house. All demolished by the mid-1960s.
- 1965–66: The King's School period buildings on the site were demolished.
- 1969: fire damaged one rear wing.
- 1970s: first floor ceilings and stone hall ceiling relined in plaster in a decorative Federation period pattern. Original ceilings were cedar boards (noted in the 1960s). The joinery was restored including the cedar staircase.
- 1974: new basement space excavated under rear courtyard by opening up two underground water cisterns.
- 1975: major restoration works completed, including to the eastern kitchen/servants' wing. The c.1934 weatherboard and stone addition on the house's eastern side, was rebuilt or reclad entirely in stone. The hipped main roof of the house was extended east and the pitch altered. The veranda however was reinstated at a later date.
- 1981–82: a new attached east wing (kitchen, breakfast room and storage, with attic room for a housekeeper) was built, to a form similar to its original appearance with sandstone walls by the owner in 1981. It is likely that this new wing re-used dressed stone blocks of the 1850s kitchen wing that was demolished, as well as other stone brought in from elsewhere. The east return of the front veranda and flagging was reconstructed, albeit on a new alignment.
- 1984: house roof re-sheathed in corrugated zinc-coated steel.

== Heritage listing ==
Macarthur House is an example of an intact house built by noted builder James Houison. It is one of the few remaining large Mid Victorian homes remaining in the Parramatta Area which has many historic links with well known local families such as M. Gould and J. Houison, Henry Harvey, the Rev. T.S. Forsaith and the King's School NSW.

Built in 1857 by J. Moreton Gould, it was bought by J. S. Forsaith in 1874 and Reverend P S Waddy in 1910. From 1922 to 1966 it was owned by the King's School and renamed in honour of the Reverend George Fairfowl Macarthur, a former King's School headmaster and son of Hannibal H. Macarthur of The Vineyard.

Macarthur House was listed on the New South Wales State Heritage Register on 2 April 1999 having satisfied the following criteria.

The place is important in demonstrating the course, or pattern, of cultural or natural history in New South Wales.

This item historically significant.

The place possesses uncommon, rare or endangered aspects of the cultural or natural history of New South Wales.

The house is considered to be rare, being one of only five extant buildings known to have been designed by architect James Houison, and a good example of the Old Colonial Georgian style.

The place is important in demonstrating the principal characteristics of a class of cultural or natural places/environments in New South Wales.

This item is representative. It is considered to be a good example of the Old Colonial Georgian style of architecture.

== See also ==
- Australian residential architectural styles
