= Douglas Trathen =

Australian Methodist minister and headmaster

Rev. Doug Trathen
- Born: 1 February 1916; Petersham, New South Wales
- Died: 19 September 1998 (aged 82); Murwillumbah, New South Wales
- Education: Canterbury Boys' High School; University of Sydney
- Occupations: Methodist Minister; Headmaster; Wolaroi College & Newington College
- Spouse: Irven (née) Herbert
- Children: Three daughters, one son

Douglas Arthur Trathen (1 February 1916 – 19 September 1998) was an Australian Methodist minister and the Headmaster of Wolaroi College and Newington College. He is known for his opposition to the Vietnam War and Australian conscription in the 1970s.

== Early life ==
Trathen was born in Petersham and was educated at Canterbury Boys' High School. He attended the University of Sydney and graduated in economics and arts including theology. After university he was ordained, becoming minister of the Reid Methodist Church in Reid, Australian Capital Territory, before serving in World War II with the RAAF as a chaplain. From early 1942 he served part-time as the chaplain of RAAF Station Canberra (now known as Fairbairn, Canberra) before being called up for full-time service in July 1943, becoming chaplain with No. 8 Squadron RAAF, with which he served in Queensland and New Guinea until his tour ended at the end of May 1944. He later served with No. 8 Operational Training Unit RAAF at Parkes, New South Wales and No. 58 Operational Base Unit RAAF in the Northern Territory. He was discharged in December 1945.

After the war, Trathen resumed his responsibilities as a Methodist minister, moving with his wife to Wingham, New South Wales in 1946. The following year, Trathen was transferred to a church at Corrimal, New South Wales.

== Headmaster ==
In January 1950, Trathen accepted his first school leadership position, when he was approached to become the Principal of Wolaroi College in Orange. He was described at the time as "a young man of fine gifts and extensive experience. He will bring to his new position a keen interest in Christian education, and qualifications that should make him a worthy successor to ... the retiring Principal." Trathen House, a boarding facility, is named in his honour at Kinross Wolaroi School.

In 1963, Trathen commenced duties as Headmaster of Newington College. His obituary in the Sydney Morning Herald states that: "At Newington, he quickly clashed with the establishment ... he sought to broaden the macho sports-oriented base of the school. His ideals were worthy, but his dogmatism alienated many. Interested in philosophy, he did not fit the image of a man's man." In June 1970, at the height of the political crisis about Australia's involvement in the Vietnam War, Trathen wrote a letter to the Herald speaking out against conscription and calling on young men to defy the National Service Act. He wrote: "I am loth indeed to be forced publicly to advocate (non-violent) civil disobedience ... As an ex-serviceman, a private citizen and a man of law and Law, I publicly encourage 20-year-olds, in good conscience and in loyalty to God rather than Caesar, to defy the National Service Act. Mr Gorton and members of Cabinet, for God's sake, stop." The letter was signed followed in brackets by: "The writer is the Headmaster of Newington College." The council of the college took issue with the letter and endeavoured to sack him but the conference of the Methodist Church supported him. Trathen was prosecuted for inducing citizens to break the law and although no conviction was recorded he was placed on a good behaviour bond.

== Aftermath ==
He resigned from Newington in September 1970 and went on to work in education in both the state and federal spheres. He was appointed as head of Religious Studies at the Australian Schools Commission. He moved to Canberra retiring in 1978. Relations improved with Newington College and he visited the college in 1988 as part of its 125th anniversary celebrations. His portrait in oils by Bryan Westwood hangs in the Prescott Hall.

== Marriage and family ==
Trathen married Irven Runa Herbert in 1942. She was the daughter of Grace (née McLaughlan) and Edgar William Herbert (1884–1948). Her father was a pioneer of physical education in Australia who had initially trained as a plumber and studied architecture on the side in Adelaide. In 1906 he won a scholarship to study physical education at Springfield College in Massachusetts. From 1924 the Herbert family lived in Castlecrag. Her parents were close personal friends of Marion Mahony and Walter Burley Griffin. On moving to Castlecrag the Herbert family initially lived in a Griffin-designed house built for King O’Malley. Irven studied at the Sydney Conservatorium of Music. She and Trathern had four children. He died in Murwillumbah, survived by his wife and children. Irven Trathen died in the same town on 9 March 2011. During the Regime of the Colonels, in Greece, their daughter Bronwyn Trathen was imprisoned for twelve months. Their son Dr Stephen Trathen is an associate professor in industrial design at the University of Canberra.

== Bibliography ==
- Malcolm Brown, Obituary, Sydney Morning Herald, 3 October 1998, p. 31
- David Macmillan, Newington College 1863–1963 (Sydney, 1963)
- Peter Swain, Newington Across the Years 1863–1998 (Sydney, 1999)

Preceded by Dr Ernest Duncan	Headmaster; Newington College; 1963–1970	Succeeded by Tony Rae AM
