= Anna Fellowes Vroland =

Schoolteacher and human-rights advocate

- passport photo
- Born: Anna Fellowes White; 7 May 1902; Ascot Vale, Victoria, Australia
- Died: 23 April 1978 (aged 75); Box Hill, Victoria, Australia
- Education: Methodist Ladies' College
- Occupation: teacher
- Known for: human rights advocate
- Spouse: Anton William Rutherford Vroland

Anna Fellowes Vroland born Anna Fellowes White (7 May 1902 – 23 April 1978) was an Australian schoolteacher and human-rights advocate.

== Life ==
Vroland was born in Ascot Vale in 1902. Her parents, Jane (born Butler) and John White, arranged for an aunt to teach her and she also attended the Methodist Ladies' College in Kew.

In 1947, she married Anton William Rutherford Vroland and in the same year and 1948 she was arguing in New South Wales newspapers for an improved treatment of the Australian Aboriginal people. She described herself as one of the many people concerned for their well-being and she was keen to note that she had no official position. She argued for a new deal that recognised that they had lost access to their traditional way of life and that they needed sympathy and not punishing jail sentences.

She spent time listening and analysing aboriginal songs. As a result, she published a book on the subject titled Their Music Has Roots. Strictly speaking the people she was talking to would have been identified as non-aboriginal as they were of mixed race.

She began teaching at various schools and she came to notice when she became the headteacher of Woodstock Girls' School in New South Wales for six months beginning in 1961. Her appointment only lasted that long because of the progressive teaching methods that she introduced. Vroland had experience of experimental methods from a private primary school that she had taught at, in Belgrave in 1928. Woodstock Girls' School did not want these ideas and there was gossip that she was a communist.

Vroland died in Box Hill in 1978.
