= Herbert Hake =

English cricketer

Personal information
- Full name: Herbert Denys Hake
- Born: 8 November 1894; Christchurch, Hampshire, England
- Died: 17 April 1975 (aged 80); Sydney, New South Wales, Australia
- Batting: Right-handed
- Bowling: Unknown
- Relatives: Stanley Toyne (uncle)

Domestic team information
- Years: Team
- 1920–1921: Cambridge University
- 1920–1925: Hampshire

Career statistics
Competition	First-class
Matches	26
Runs scored	557
Batting average	15.91
100s/50s	–/3
Top score	94
Balls bowled	18
Wickets	0
Bowling average	–
5 wickets in innings	–
10 wickets in match	–
Best bowling	–
Catches/stumpings	6/1
- Source: Cricinfo, 12 January 2010

Herbert Denys Hake OBE (8 November 1894 — 12 April 1975) was an English first-class cricketer and schoolmaster. Hake served in the First World War with the Royal Hampshire Regiment, after which he played first-class cricket for Cambridge University and Hampshire. As an educator, he taught firstly at Haileybury, before emigrating to Australia to become headmaster at The King's School. In the 1950s, he was Chairman of Conference of the Headmasters' Conference of the Independent Schools of Australia.

== Early life and first-class cricket ==
The son of Edwin Denys Hake and his wife, Marianne, he was born in November 1894 at Christchurch, Hampshire. He was educated at Haileybury, where he excelled at sports; he played for the college cricket team (captaining it in his last three years) and partook in athletics, rackets and Eton fives. In his final year, he was also head boy of the college. Hake served in the British Army during the First World War, being commissioned into the Royal Hampshire Regiment as a second lieutenant in October 1914. In December 1914, he was made a temporary lieutenant, later being made a temporary captain in April 1916; he relinquished his temporary commissions in April 1917. He served during the war with the 2nd Battalion in British India and in the Mesopotamian campaign.

Following the war, he began studying history at Queens' College, Cambridge. While studying at Cambridge, he was a member of the Cambridge University Cricket Club, for whom he made his debut in first-class cricket for against P. F. Warner's XI at Fenner's in 1920. In that same season, he made four appearances for Hampshire in the County Championship. In 1921, he played four further first-class matches for Cambridge, bringing his final tally of appearances for the university to five. His appearances for Cambridge were limited by the strong nature of their batting line-up, thus he never gained his cricket blue. In addition to playing cricket for Cambridge, Hake also played field hockey and rackets, for which he gained a blue and half-blue respectively. Following his graduation from Cambridge in 1921, he began teaching at Haileybury. When the summer holidays allowed, Hake continued to play first-class cricket for Hampshire until 1925, making a further seventeen appearances for the county. In 21 first-class matches for Hampshire, he scored 478 runs at an average of 17.30; he made three half centuries, with a highest score of 94 against Leicestershire in 1921. He was described by Wisden as "a fine striker of the ball [who] could score very fast", in addition to describing him as a "beautiful field [who] could keep wicket if required".

== Teaching career and later life ==
Hake continued to teach at Haileybury until 1927, after which he spent a year in South Africa teaching at St John's College, before returning to Haileybury. A year after his return to England, he competed in the 1929 English Amateur Rackets Championship and was runner-up. In 1938, he accepted a move to Australia to become headmaster at The King's School, Parramatta; prior to his move, he married Elizabeth Cecilia Barton at Clapham, Yorkshire.

Hake took up the headmastership at King's in February 1939, at a time when the school's enrolled students had fallen by nearly half in a decade under the headmastership of his predecessor, The Reverend Charles Tasman Parkinson. His reforms of the school sought to bring about liberalisation, in contrast to the procedures established by Parkinson's predecessor, The Reverend Edward Morgan Baker. Although the Second World War slowed down his reforms, Hake was influential in securing a new site for the school at "Gowan Brae" in Parramatta in 1954, which allowed it to move from its original location which was deemed to be inadequate and restricted in its scope for expansion. He remained as headmaster until 1964, to allow for continuity whilst the school was moved to its new location. Under his tenure, student numbers had increased by 601.

Hake served as the Chairman of Conference of the Headmasters' Conference of the Independent Schools of Australia from 1952 to 1954, and was described as a commanding figure within it. He was appointed a fellow of the Australian College of Educators in 1962 and was a member of the Australian Club. He was appointed an OBE in the 1961 Birthday Honours. Hake spent his final years afflicted by lameness and blindness living between Mount Wilson and Glenhaven. Hake died at the Royal Prince Alfred Hospital in Sydney on 12 April 1975. He was survived by his wife and three daughters. His uncle, Stanley Toyne, was also a first-class cricketer.
