= Ernest Duncan =

New Zealand mathematician (1916–1990)

Ernest Roland Duncan
- Born: 1916; Clyde, New Zealand
- Died: 1990 (aged 73–74); New Jersey, United States of America
- Education: University of Otago
- Occupations: Mathematician, headmaster & Professor

Ernest Roland Duncan (25 January 1916 – November 25, 1990) was a mathematician born in New Zealand, who became a headmaster in Australia and a professor in America .

== Early career ==
Duncan was born in Clyde, New Zealand, and graduated from the University of Otago. As an educator, he rose to the position of inspector of schools for the New Zealand Education Department and made a significant contribution to the introduction of the new mathematics curriculum. He wrote textbooks that were extensively used in New Zealand primary schools and were also published in the United States. In 1958, he moved to the North America as a university lecturer and received his doctorate from Columbia University.

== Australian headmaster ==
In 1961, Duncan became headmaster of Newington College, an inner-city Sydney private boys school. Shortly thereafter, he immediately proposed that the school should be moved to a larger site in the northern suburbs, but this suggestion met with resistance from the college council. Before the end of the academic year, however, he had resigned and returned to the United States.

== American professor ==
In 1962, Duncan became professor of mathematics at Rutgers University and at the time of his retirement, in 1977, was chairman of the department of curriculum and instruction in the Graduate School of Education. In 1982, he set aside a Trust fund to endow annual awards for "excellent teachers of Mathematics" in New Zealand and the United States. He died in a Morristown, New Jersey hospital of leukemia on November 25, 1990. He lived in Bernardsville, New Jersey and was survived by his wife, Lois, two daughters and a son.

== Publications ==
- Modern School Mathematics, published by Houghton Mifflin

== Sources ==
- D. S. Macmillan, Newington College 1863–1963 (Syd, 1963)
- P. L. Swain, Newington Across the Years 1863–1998 (Syd, 1999)
- A. H. McLintock, Encyclopaedia of New Zealand, 'Expatriates – Biographies' (N.Z., 1966)

Preceded by Lawrence Pyke	Headmaster; Newington College; 1962	Succeeded by Rev Douglas Trathen
