= James Ralph Darling =

Australian headmaster (1899–1995)

Sir James Ralph Darling CMG OBE
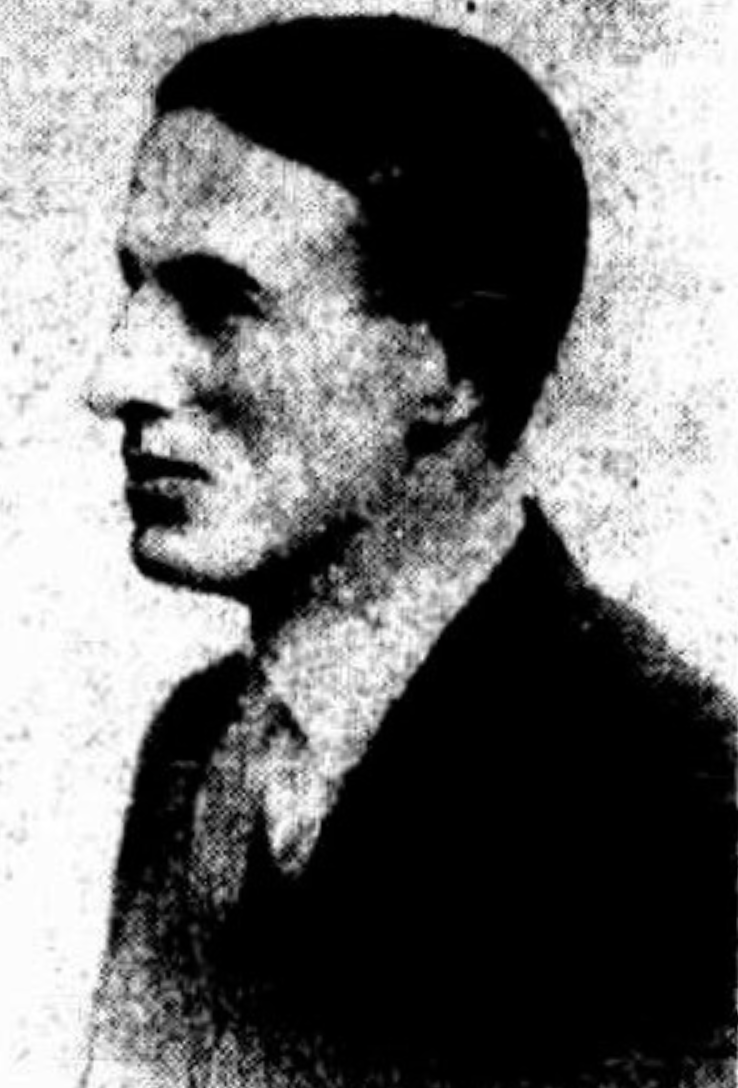
- Darling circa 1930
- Born: 18 June 1899; Tonbridge, England
- Died: 1 November 1995 (aged 96); Melbourne, Australia
- Education: Repton School; Oriel College, Oxford
- Occupations: Headmaster; Geelong Grammar School; Chairman; Headmasters' Conference of the Independent Schools of Australia; Chairman; Australian Broadcasting Commission
- Spouse(s): Margaret, née Campbell
- Children: 4
- Parent(s): Augustine Major Darling; Jane Baird (née Nimmo)

Sir James Ralph Darling (18 June 1899 – 1 November 1995) was an English and Australian educator. He was the headmaster of Geelong Grammar School (1930–1961) and chairman of the Australian Broadcasting Commission (1961–1967).

== Early life ==
Darling was born in Tonbridge, England, the second child of Augustine Major Darling and his Scottish wife Jane Baird (née Nimmo). He was educated at the preparatory school in Tonbridge run by his father, then at Repton School a boarding school in Derbyshire. He was a second lieutenant in the Royal Field Artillery in France and occupied Germany in 1918 and 1919 before reading history at Oriel College, Oxford. He taught from 1921 to 1924 at Merchant Taylors' School in Liverpool, before joining the staff of Charterhouse in Surrey.

== Headmaster ==
He was appointed as headmaster of Geelong Grammar School in 1930. The student population of the school had grown from 370 to 1,139 by the time of his retirement. He was a founding member of the Headmasters' Conference of the Independent Schools of Australia and was its sixth chairman. During his time at Geelong, Darling set up the Outward Bound campus Timbertop in the foothills of the Australian Alps between Mansfield and Mount Buller where academic work was supplemented by a wide range of physical activity. Notable pupils included future prime minister John Gorton and Charles, Prince of Wales. Darling was a founder and first national president of the Australian College of Educators. He served from 1933 to 1971 on the council of the University of Melbourne and he was a member of the Universities Commission from 1941 to 1951.

Darling believed that it was of primary importance in education to cultivate sensitivity in students, but that toughness was also required for effective leadership. He revolutionised Geelong Grammar School with his educational philosophy, overhauling the curriculum and focusing less on achievement and more on learning. He encouraged selflessness and hard work over competitiveness and idleness. He had Christian socialist views.

== ABC chairman ==
After his retirement as headmaster, he was for several years chairman of the Australian Broadcasting Commission (ABC). The decision by the Holt Liberal Party government in 1967 not to reappoint him was rumoured to be because of the perceived criticism of the government's policies by the ABC. This led to considerable controversy, involving Mike Willesee, an ABC reporter, who was the son of Don Willesee, a Labor Party senator.

== Later years ==
In retirement Darling often wrote for newspapers and published his own books. In 1988 he was named on a list of 200 great Australians (of whom only 22 were living, he being the only headmaster on the list). He died aged 96 in Melbourne in 1995. In his obituary Darling was referred to as a prophet whose integrity, insight, intelligence and courage gave him great standing in the community.

== Honours ==
- Officer of Order of the British Empire (1953)
- Companion of Order of St Michael and St George (1958)
- Knight Bachelor (1968) for services to education and broadcasting

== Publications ==
- The Education of a Civilized Man: A Selection of Speeches and Sermons (Melbourne, 1962)
- Timbertop: An Innovation in Australian Education (Melbourne, 1967)
- Richly Rewarding (Melbourne, 1978)
- Reflections for the Age (Melbourne, 1991)

Media offices
Preceded by Richard Boyer	Chairman of the Australian Broadcasting Commission; 1961–1967	Succeeded by Robert Madgwick
