= Harrisford =

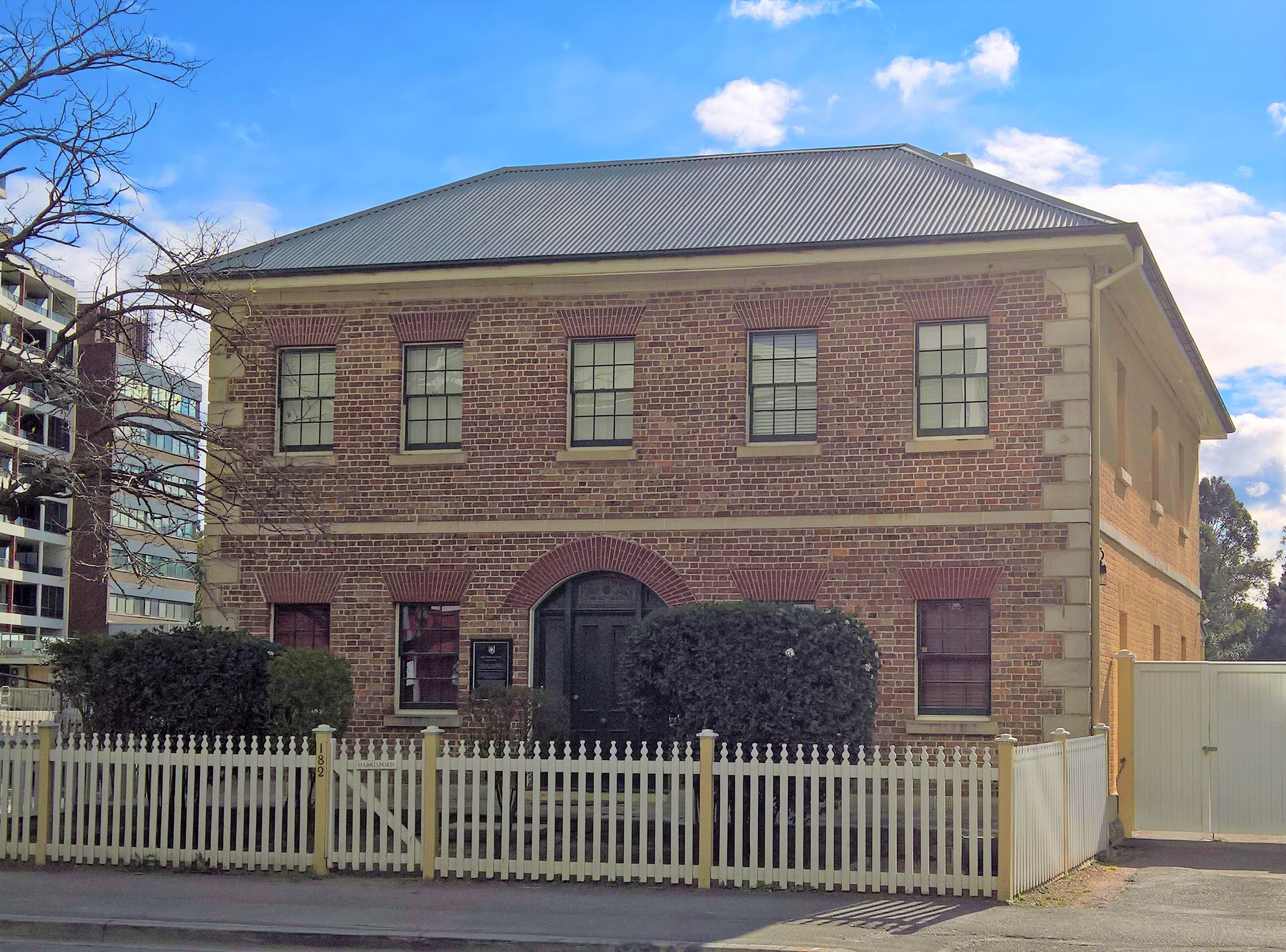
- Harrisford in 2019

- Location within Sydney Location within Australia
- 33.8148°S 151.0105°E
- Location: 182 George Street, Parramatta, City of Parramatta, Sydney, New South Wales, Australia

History
- Built: 1823–1829

Site notes
- Owner: The Kings School Old Boys Union

New South Wales Heritage Register
- Official name: Harrisford
- Type: state heritage (built)
- Designated: 2 April 1999
- Reference no.: 248
- Type: House
- Category: Residential buildings (private)

Harrisford is a heritage-listed former residence, school building, factory and workshop at 182 George Street, Parramatta, New South Wales, Australia. It was built between 1823 and 1829. The property is owned by The Kings School Old Boys Union. It was added to the New South Wales State Heritage Register on 2 April 1999.

== History ==
The house Harrisford was built between 1823 and 1829 for the Rev. William Walker when he married Rowland Hassall's daughter.

In 1832, Walker leased it to The King's School as their inaugural premises, following the school's instigation by Archdeacon William Broughton. The school commenced on 13 February 1832, with the Rev. Robert Forrest as headmaster. Opening with about a dozen boys, the school by the end of that year had a respectable enrolment of 41 boarders and 12 day boys. Two nearby cottages housed the boarders. It was one of four early schools in the colony, along with the Sydney College, the Normal Institution and the Australian College. All four schools offered a higher, and classical, education for the sons of the well-to-do families of the colony. The King's School occupied the building until 1836.

In around 1840, William Woolls, a former staff member of both The King's School and Sydney College commenced his own school and leased the former premises of The King's School. Woolls' school had 31 residents at the 1841 census, including family, staff and boarding pupils. He also earned a commendation from the Governor of New South Wales, with Sir George Gipps noting in his annual report of 30 September 1842 that "...of the private schools many serve to be mentioned with commendation, particularly that of the Rev'd Mr Forrest at Campbelltown, that of Mr Cape in Sydney, and of Mr Woolls in Parramatta."

A brief description of the activities of a school boy at Woolls' school is the reminiscences of one pupil, Walter Campbell, a boarder at Harrisford for two years in the mid-1850s and later NSW Director of Agriculture. Campbell wrote his reminiscences in 1932, painting an idyllic picture of his days at Harrisford. He says of Woolls:

'He was remarkably kind and sympathetic in imparting instruction, ..... The boys, who were nearly all boarders, had their quarters in Harrisford, with a detached one-roomed building between it and the river serving as the school room. This was much the same arrangement that had existed twenty years earlier when Harrisford was used by The Kings School. The Parramatta River, not unexpectedly, provided the pleasures of fishing and swimming, but in 1841 a master had drowned who had gone to the rescue of a boy in difficulties. For the 25 or so pupils, there were rambles and picnics in General Macarthur's Bush, and walks to Baulkham Hills and Beyond.

Campbell also provides a glimpse of Woolls' domestic life, his daughters and Mrs Woolls playing the piano, and Woolls himself playing "a large old-fashioned amber coloured flute with six finger holes and one key". The household exhibited some degree of prosperity for there were two housemaids, a cook and a handyman. At one time the cook had been an Aboriginal woman. There was an assistant master to instruct in arithmetic, writing and spelling, leaving Woolls to attend to Latin and other subjects. Some of the pupils from The King's School enrolled at Woolls' school, including George Fairfowl Macarthur. In the early 1840s Woolls also had as pupils Henry and Robert Radford, step-sons of wealthy Sydney wool-merchant Alexander Brodie Spark. Spark lived in affluence in his mansion, "Tempe" on the banks of the Cooks River, about 16 km from Sydney.

Woolls vacated Harrisford in 1864 and moved to the larger premises of Newlands, a property which had once belonged to the Rev. Samuel Marsden on the northern bank of the Parramatta River, although Gilbert says "in or about 1865". Never large, catering for about 30 boys at a time it seems to have been a happy, enlightened and enlightening institution which the boys remembered with gratitude and affection. Gilbert adds that Woolls remained at Newlands for the last seven years or so of his teaching career. The school was for local boys as wells as boarders. During Woolls' stay at Newlands, he continued his extensive botanical studies including botany in the school curriculum, taking the boys regularly on field trips around the hills of Parramatta collecting samples of unknown specimens. Woolls was an important early schoolmaster and botanist. He lectured frequently on the botanical landscape and was recognised by the greatest of the British and European botanists and on whose recommendation Woolls was admitted in 1865, as a Fellow of the Linnean Society in London, one of the most respected scientific organisations in Britain. In August 1872 Woolls retired from teaching and was admitted to the Holy Order in 1873, becoming the Rev. William Woolls.

The building in 1870 was painted and had a Georgian fanlight and six panelled door and glazed half sidelights with lattice style decoration. Pickets on fence had round tops with unusual turned spindle gate.

Later residents included John Harris, nephew of Surgeon Dr John Harris of Harris Park. The building was later used a peanut butter factory, stationery shop and car workshop.

Harrisford was restored by King's School Old Boys Union in 1980 to its 1830s configuration, using Clive Lucas, Stapleton & Partners heritage architects.

In 2003, a high rise apartment building was built only meters from Harrisford's western boundary.

== Description ==
Harrisford is a two-storey Old Colonial Georgian house. It features Flemish bond brick walls, sandstone quoins, foundations, and stringline at first floor level and a hipped corrugated iron roof which was originally shingles. The joinery and fittings, while in 1830s style, are reproductions.

It is surrounded by a timber picket fence with a well-kept garden, and an early kitchen or schoolroom building at the rear of the residence.

== Heritage listing ==
Harrisford, which is located between George Street and the river, is one of the oldest houses remaining in the township of Parramatta. It is an important element at the head of the river, representing the early years of settlement. The site possesses potential to contribute to an understanding early of urban development in Parramatta. Harrisford is historically and socially significant and is representative.

Harrisford was listed on the New South Wales State Heritage Register on 2 April 1999.

== See also ==
- Australian residential architectural styles
