= Scots School Albury =

- The School's logo/crest

Location
- 393 Perry Street; Albury, New South Wales, 2640; Australia; 36.072421°S 146.927749°E

Information
- Motto: Fide et Literis (Faith and Learning)
- Religious affiliation: Uniting Church
- Opened: 1972
- Status: Now enrolling
- Sister school: Shohei High School
- Grades: Kindergarten to Year 12
- Website: http://www.scotsalbury.nsw.edu.au/

The Scots School Albury is an independent, K–12, co-educational day and boarding School, located in Albury, New South Wales, Australia. It draws students from the local area and other parts of Australia. It is associated with the Uniting Church in Australia but is not managed or governed by the Church.

The school was the result of the merger in 1972 of Albury Grammar School (founded in 1866) and Woodstock Presbyterian Girls School.

Two single-sex boarding houses (Sellars House for boys' boarding and Wilson House for girls' boarding) accommodate students from Years 7–12 on campus.

Its 2012 enrolment includes approximately 500 secondary school students and 175 junior school students. Located a short distance from the centre of Albury, The Scots School Albury features a blend of modern and older buildings set in 11 ha of extensive grounds.

== History ==
In 1866, the Anglican Church under the direction of the Bishop of Goulburn, the Very Rev. Mesac Thomas, opened the Albury Grammar School. In 1878, the Rev. Joseph Masters, M.A., a Congregational minister, was appointed its headmaster. In 1881, he left the school and opened his own co-educational school called Albury High School. In 1887, due to ill health, Masters sold the school to two young Melbourne school masters Alfred John Smith and George Bailey Wilson.

Early in the new century the school changed its name to Albury Grammar school. In 1902, Smith was killed in a buggy accident, and Wilson assumed full ownership of the school. In 1909 Wilson moved the school to its present campus, where it remained co-educational until in 1928 he sold it to the Presbyterian Church in New South Wales and it became an all-boys school.

There had been private all girls schools operating in Albury during this period, 'Glenair' and 'Albury Ladies College'. Both of these were purchased by Jessie Heath in 1910 and became 'Springfield/Glenair Ladies College'. This school closed in 1916, and girls were accepted at the Grammar School by Wilson until 1928.

In 1926, the 'Rosehill Girls' School' was opened by Lillian Windridge and later sold in 1938 to Anna Drennan. In 1939 Drennan moved the school to a new location and renamed it 'Woodstock Girls' School'. Drennan retired in 1946, and the school was taken over and operated by a community based Council. Anna Fellowes Vroland became the head in 1961 but she was sacked after six months for being too progressive.

In 1958, the Presbyterian Church gave permission for the school to include 'Presbyterian' in its name, becoming 'Woodstock Presbyterian Girls' School'. In 1962 'Woodstock' moved location to a green acre site in North Albury, where it remained until 1971, when the Albury Grammar School and 'Woodstock' decided to amalgamate to form a new coeducational school. The school was named 'The Scots School Albury' and was established on the original grammar school campus. In 1969 Tony Rae was appointed Headmaster and he served until the end of 1971 when he was appointed head of Newington College.

== Pipe band ==
In 1939, the school formed a cadet unit, consisting of two drums and two bugles. It remained as a drum band until 1956, when an introduction of bagpipes was established and the Grammar School Pipes and Drums was established. The Cadet unit and Band adopted the Gordon Tartan and the Glengarry as its uniform, which in 1965 was worn in public for the first time. After the amalgamation of Albury Grammar and Woodstock Presbyterian Girls School, interested girls were admitted to the band as male numbers had declined. Female band members have remained a strong asset to the band ever since, with about 30% of learners being female.

Official funding for the school cadet corp ceased in 1982, causing them to disband. Scots continued on with its pipe band though, attaining a qualified instructor in 1980.

In 2014, the band made its first international trip, performing at the Jakarta Highland Gathering where it was crowned South East Asian Champions in the Juvenile grade. They returned later in 2015 to successfully defend their title. August 2014 saw band members travel to Scotland to compete at several competitions including the World Pipe Band Championships. The trip provided an incredible musical experience for the pipe band students and exposed them to many world class bands that rarely perform in Australia. In October 2014, the band travelled to Canberra for the 2014 ACT Championships where it was crowned champions in the grade 4 competition.

In March 2016, the band competed at the New Zealand Pipe Band Championships. They faced tough competition in both Grade 4 and Juvenile. One of the highlights of the trip was the band's grade 4 midsection drummers (bass and tenor drums) winning the best midsection prize in the grade 4 competition. History was made in October when the pipe band competed for the first time at the 2016 Australian Pipe Band Championships. Although several members of the band had previously competed at the Nationals as members of other bands, this was the first time The Scots School Albury Pipe Band had competed as its own entity. The band finished 4th in the grade 4 competition in a pool of 23 bands and 5th in the Juvenile grade which featured some of the top young piping and drumming talent from across Australia and New Zealand.

2016 saw Scots celebrate their sesquicentennial year. The pipe band played a major role in the celebrations, organising a highland gathering and tattoo. The event drew over 4,000 people and included the sights and sounds of pipe bands, highland dancing, clan tents, kilted warriors and a delicious selection of food.

A prestigious invitation to attend The Royal Edinburgh Military Tattoo in 2017 was grasped by the band. The Royal Edinburgh Military Tattoo is an annual series of military tattoos performed by British Armed Forces, Commonwealth and international military bands and artistic performance teams on the esplanade of Edinburgh Castle in the capital of Scotland. The event is held each August as part of the Edinburgh Festival and it is viewed live by around 220,000 spectators each year and attracts a global television audience of over 100 million people.

The Scots School Albury Pipe Band was crowned the 2023 World Pipe Band Championships in Glasgow in August, just weeks after taking out the Scottish Pipe Band Championship in their category, Grade 4B. The Band was also crowned Grade 4B Best Drum Corps as well as Champion of Champion, which takes into account the Band's wins in the Scottish and World Titles. The remarkable World Championship effort was accomplished by a mix of alumni, current students (some as young as 12 years old!) and friends of the Pipe Band. Whilst securing this victory, the band was also involved in a 26-performance schedule at the Royal Edinburgh Military Tattoo. This was the Pipe Band's second appearance at the Tattoo. It performed in 2017 and was invited back for the 2020 Tattoo, ultimately cancelled due to the COVID-19 pandemic. This year's Tattoo ran with the colourful theme, Stories, and played host to a stunning array of performers from all points of the compass. The Scots Band performed as part of the Massed Pipes and Drums in every one of the 26 performances across 20 days. They also performed to acclaim at Piping Live!, an annual week-long celebration of bagpipes from across the world, embracing Scotland's heritage and that of piping cultures from around the globe.

The band currently has 32 players registered with the Australian Pipe Band Association for the purposes of competing at Association competitions and there are 56 pupils attending piping and drumming tuition each week.

== Notable alumni ==
- Amy Chapman – Australian footballer – Matildas
- Andrew Hoy – Olympic Horse Riding Champion
- Britteny Cox – Australian mogul skier
- David Reynolds – V8 Supercars driver
- Peter Densley – Australian rules footballer
- Lisa Mitchell – Australian singer
- Charlie Spargo – Australian rules footballer
- Will Setterfield – Australian rules footballer
- Jan Morgiewicz – former Labor Candidate and Political Commentator
- Peter Charley – Australian journalist
- Harry Dean – Australian rules footballer

== See also ==
- List of non-government schools in New South Wales
- List of boarding schools
