= Headmasters' Conference of the Independent Schools of Australia =

- Abbreviation: HCISA
- Successor: Association of Heads of Independent Schools of Australia (AHISA)
- Formation: 1931
- Founder: Sir Francis Rolland, Sir James Darling, Leonard Robson, Rev Julian Bickersteth
- Dissolved: 1985
- Type: Educational association
- Purpose: Representation and coordination of independent school leadership
- Region served: Australia

The Headmasters' Conference of the Independent Schools of Australia (HCISA) was founded in 1931 and amalgamated in 1985 with the Association of Independent Headmistresses to form the Association of Heads of Independent Schools of Australia. It is the peak body representing the independent schools of Australia. It was modeled on the English Conference and was founded by four of the most influential Headmasters in Australia's history (Sir Francis Rolland CMG OBE , Sir James Darling , Leonard Robson CBE MC and the Rev Julian Bickersteth MC . A history of the Conference outlining its activities and influence was written by James Wilson Hogg MBE. The Journal of the Conference is held by the National Library of Australia.

== Chairman of Conference ==
- William Littlejohn of Scotch College, Melbourne
- Richard Penrose Franklin of Melbourne Grammar School
- Francis Rolland of Geelong College
- Leonard Robson of Sydney Church of England Grammar School
- Fred Ward of Prince Alfred College
- James Ralph Darling of Geelong Grammar School
- Colin Gilray of Scotch College, Melbourne
- Denys Hake of The King's School, Sydney
- Brian Hone of Melbourne Grammar School
- Colin Gordon of St Peter's College, Adelaide
- James Wilson Hogg of Trinity Grammar School, Sydney
- Colin Healey of Scotch College, Melbourne
- Henry Roberts of Anglican Church Grammar School
- John Dunning of Prince Alfred College
- Peter Thwaites of Geelong College
- Basil Travers of Sydney Church of England Grammar School
- Peter Moyes of Christ Church Grammar School
- Paul McKeown of Canberra Grammar School
- Gerard Cramer of Carey Baptist Grammar School
- Mark Bishop of Cranbrook School Sydney
- Tony Rae of Newington College
- Max Howell of Brisbane Grammar School
