= Peter Charley =

Australian journalist

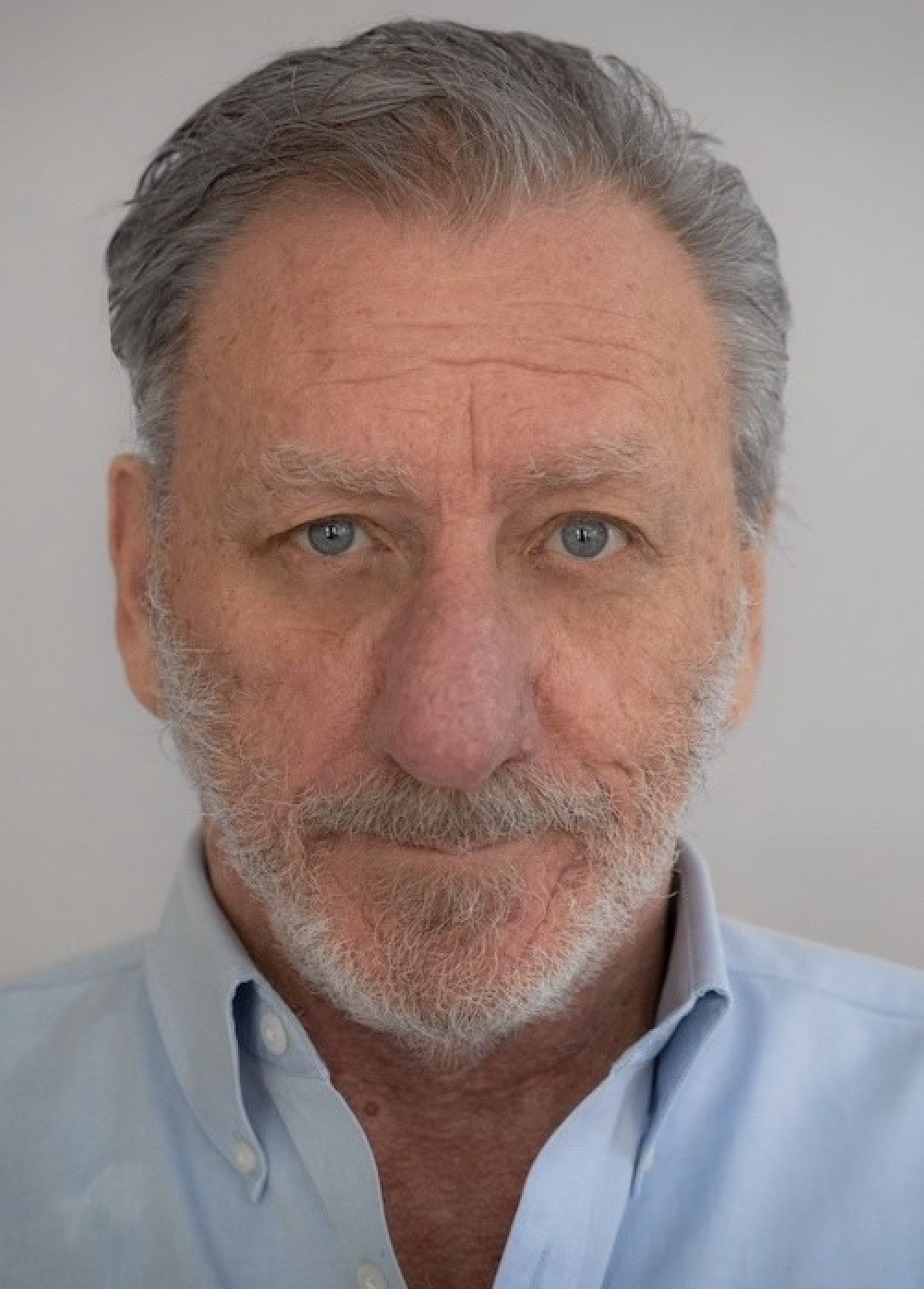
- Born: Deniliquin, New South Wales, Australia
- Education: Scots School Albury; Newington College; New York University; The University of Sydney; Harvard University; European Academy, Berlin; Escuela Dinámico, Antigua; Academia de Español, Quito
- Occupations: Journalist, television producer, author
- Employer: Al Jazeera
- Parent: Philip Nivison Charley OAM
- Relatives: Sir Philip Belmont Charley (grandfather); Major Philip Charley (great grandfather)

Peter Charley is an Australian journalist, documentary film maker, television producer and author.

== Early life and education ==
Charley was born in Deniliquin, New South Wales, Australia. His father, Philip Nivison Charley OAM was the son of Sir Philip Belmont Charley and grandson of Major Philip Charley, one of the ‘Syndicate of Seven’ who founded Broken Hill Proprietary Ltd in 1883. In 2021, BHP's revenue was estimated to be US$60.82 billion. Charley spent his teenage years at boarding school in Australia and in Papua New Guinea where his family was based in Goroka, Madang and Port Moresby. In 1973, he was invited to accompany a medical expedition into the remote Eastern Highlands of Papua New Guinea to investigate an outbreak of the fatal brain disorder kuru caused by ritualistic cannibalism.

Charley attended The Scots School, Albury, and Newington College, in Sydney. He studied communications at New York University and holds a master's degree in media practice from The University of Sydney. At Harvard University, Charley studied Central Challenges of American National Security, Strategy and the Press (via Ed-X). Charley undertook European studies at the European Academy in Berlin and studied Spanish Language at Escuela Dinámico in Antigua, Guatemala, and Spanish Language and Latin American Culture at the Academia de Español in Quito, Ecuador.

== Journalism career ==
Charley began his career as a reporter on The Sydney Morning Herald and the Sydney Sun newspapers in Australia where he worked as a general news reporter, feature writer and music critic. He later worked as an on-air news and current affairs reporter and producer at the Seven Network in Australia before moving to New York, where he worked as Associate Producer at Sixty Minutes, Channel Nine, and as a reporter for National Public Radio.

Charley traveled extensively throughout Central and South America, covering conflict and civil unrest in El Salvador, Nicaragua, Guatemala, Honduras, Mexico, Peru, Ecuador, Chile, Bolivia, Argentina, Paraguay, Uruguay and Brazil.

Charley's coverage of conflict also included unrest in Syria, Cambodia's fight against the Khmer Rouge, East Timor's struggle for independence, the Bougainville war, unrest in South Africa, Libya and the Los Angeles riots.

In 1986, Charley was appointed Show Producer of the weekly, current affairs program, The Reporters, produced by Fox Television, New York.

Between 2000 and 2007, Charley worked as Executive Producer of the ABC TV's flagship news program, Lateline. He then joined Australia's SBS television as Executive Producer of the international current affairs program, Dateline – a position he held for seven years. In 2014, he left Dateline to take up the role of Senior Executive Producer of Al Jazeera's North American investigative unit, based in Washington, DC.

At Al Jazeera, Charley was responsible for producing, writing and reporting the controversial two-part series 'How to Sell a Massacre' which involved a three-year undercover infiltration of the National Rifle Association of America. The program led to the resignation of 'Pauline Hanson's One Nation' Senate candidate Steve Dickson after secretly-recorded video showed Dickson and One Nation's Chief of Staff James Ashby meeting with officials from the NRA and with representatives of Koch Industries in Washington, DC. In 2019, Charley was approached by HarperCollins to write a book on the making of the documentary series. The book, 'How to Sell a Massacre - One Nation, the US gun lobby and $20 million - inside journalism's most audacious sting', was published in August 2020, reaching an Amazon ranking of Number One Best Seller under the categories of Federal Jurisdiction Law, Conventional Weapons and Warfare History, Political Freedom, Journalism & Nonfiction Writing Reference, and Radical Political Thought.

Charley has twice been invited by the International Academy of Television Arts and Sciences to participate as Juror for the International Emmy Awards competition to judge international television programming.

== Awards ==
Title of work	Award name	Award given	Award year	Notes
On Life’s Border – The Plight of North Korean Refugees in China	Johns Hopkins University's; School of Advanced International Studies	First Prize, SAIS Novartis Awards	2000	
On Life’s Border – The Struggle of North Korea’s Refugees	Walkley Award	Winner, Excellence in International Reporting (with Jung-Eun Kim)	2000	
One Last Chance	New York Festivals	Best Investigative Report	2000	
One Last Chance	Columbus International Film & Video Festival	Chris Award Statue	2000	
Kidnapped	Human Rights Press Award, Hong Kong	Winner (as executive producer of Dateline, SBS)	2009	
Dateline, SBS	New York Festivals	Best Current Affairs Program	2013	
The Dark Side	New York Festivals	Gold World Medal, Sports	2017	
The Dark Side	New York Festivals	Gold World Medal, Current Affairs	2017	
The Poacher's Pipeline	Society for Environmental Journalists	Honorable Mention, Outstanding In-depth Reporting	2017	
The Poacher's Pipeline	Asian Television Awards	Highly Commended	2017	
The Poacher's Pipeline	CINE Golden Eagle Awards	Finalist, Investigations	2017	
The Poacher's Pipeline	Association of International Broadcasters	Highly commended, Investigative	2017	
The Poacher's Pipeline	Headliner Awards	Second Place, Documentary	2017	
The Poacher's Pipeline	Rockie Awards, Banff World Media Festival	Finalist, Social & Investigative	2017	
The Poacher's Pipeline	Foreign Press Association Media Awards	Winner, Environment Story of the Year	2017	
The Poacher's Pipeline	Wildlife Conservation Film Festival, New York	Best Middle East Film	2017	
The Poacher's Pipeline	Vancouver South African Film Festival	People's Choice Winner	2017	
The Poacher's Pipeline	Envirofilm Awards	Winner, Best Story Presentation	2018	
The Poacher's Pipeline	New York Festivals	Silver World Medal, Current Affairs	2018	
The Poacher's Pipeline	New York Festivals	Silver World Medal, Nature and Wildlife	2018	
Spy Merchants	DIG Awards, Riccione, Italy	Best Investigative Documentary, Long Form	2018	
Spy Merchants	New York Festivals	Gold World Medal, Current Affairs	2018	
Spy Merchants	Rockie Awards, Banff World Media Festival	Finalist, Crime and Investigation	2018	
Football's Wall of Silence	Association of International Broadcasters	Highly Commended, Investigative	2018	
Football's Wall of Silence	British Academy of Film and Television Arts	Finalist, Current Affairs category	2019	
Football's Wall of Silence	New York Festivals	Gold World Medal, Current Affairs	2019	
Football's Wall of Silence	New York Festivals	Gold World Medal, Sports	2019	
Islamophobia	New York Festivals	Gold World Medal, Current Affairs	2019	
Islamophobia	New York Festivals	Silver World Medal, Religious	2019	
Islamophobia	Kennedy Awards	Nominee, Journalist of the Year	2019	
How to Sell a Massacre	Broadcast Awards	Finalist	2019	
How to Sell a Massacre	Kennedy Awards	Winner, Most Outstanding Investigative Report	2019	
How to Sell a Massacre	Kennedy Awards	Finalist, Scoop of the Year	2019	
How to Sell a Massacre	Association for International Broadcasting	Winner, International Affairs	2019	
How to Sell a Massacre	Graham Perkin Awards	Finalist, Australian Journalist of the Year	2019	
How to Sell a Massacre	New York Festivals	Gold World Medal, Film	2019	
How to Sell a Massacre	Walkley Award	Winner, Scoop of the Year	2019	
How to Sell a Massacre	Gold Lovie Award	Winner, Documentary	2020	
How to Sell a Massacre	Webby Awards	'Al Jazeera Investigates Extra' Nominee	2021	
How to Sell a Massacre	Telly Awards	Gold Medal	2021	
Gold Mafia	Signal Awards	Best Writing (as Executive Producer)	2022	
Gold Mafia	Signal Awards	General News & Politics (as Executive Producer of "The Crocodile")	2022	
Gold Mafia	Signal Awards	Silver Medal (General - Documentary) (as Executive Producer of "Blowing Smoke")	2022	
The Truth Illusion	Association of International Broadcasters Award	Specialist Factual	2022	
The Truth Illusion	Gold Telly Award	Social Impact	2023	
The Truth Illusion	Silver Telly Award	General Documentary - Long Form	2023	
The Truth Illusion	Silver Telly Award	Political Commentary	2023	
The Truth Illusion	New York TV & Film Awards Gold World Medal	Documentary - Social Issues	2023	
The Truth Illusion	New York TV & Film Awards Gold World Medal	Social Issues Podcast	2023	
The Truth Illusion	New York TV & Film Awards Silver World Medal	Documentary - Current Affairs	2023	
The Truth Illusion	Shorty Award Bronze Medal	News and Politics Podcast	2023	
The Truth Illusion	Cannes Film Festival	Finalist	2023	

== Published works ==
=== Books ===
- Charley, Peter (2020). How to Sell a Massacre. Sydney: Australian Broadcasting Corporation Books, an imprint of HarperCollins Australia. ISBN 978-0-7333-4108-3.
- Charley, Peter (2026). The Truth Illusion – How America’s Addiction to Lies is Eating the Nation Alive. Berlin: De Gruyter Brill. ISBN 978-3112219454.

=== Video ===
- Charley, Peter (reporter, producer/director and cameraman) (2000). Bolivia's Coca Wars. Australia: SBS TV.
- Charley, Peter (writer and producer) (2000). On Life's Border. Australia: SBS TV.
- Charley, Peter (writer and producer) (2001). Border Lives. Australia: SBS TV.
- Charley, Peter (executive producer) (2016). The Dark Side – The Secret World of Sports Doping. YouTube.
- Charley, Peter (executive producer) (2017). Spy Merchants. YouTube.
- Charley, Peter (executive producer) (2017). The Poacher's Pipeline – Dealers, Diplomats and the Illegal Horn Trade. YouTube.
- Charley, Peter (executive producer) (2018). Football's Wall of Silence. YouTube.
- Charley, Peter (reporter and producer) (2019). How to Sell a Massacre (Episode One ed.). YouTube.
- Charley, Peter (reporter and producer) (2019). How to Sell a Massacre (Episode Two ed.). YouTube.
