= Elizabeth Fensham =

Australian writer

- Born: 1953 (age 72–73); Summer Hill, Sydney, Australia
- Known for: Australian writer of young adult literatures
- Notable work: Goodbye Jamie Boyd,
- Children: Alex Fensham.
- Father: James Wilson Hogg
- Awards: Her first novel, The Helicopter Man, won the CBCA Book of the Year for Younger Readers in 2006
- Website: .

Elizabeth Fensham (born 1953) is an Australian writer.

She was born in Summer Hill, Sydney, Australia, where she grew up as the daughter of a headmaster (James Wilson Hogg) at Trinity Grammar School. She lives in Victoria's Dandenong Ranges, where she is an English teacher at a highschool, and is married to an artist and has two adult sons, the elder a Sydney-based artist Alex Fensham.

Her first novel, The Helicopter Man, won the CBCA Book of the Year for Younger Readers in 2006. According to WorldCat, the book is held in 486 libraries, and has been translated into Italian by Loredana Serratore as Corri e non voltarti mai. Previous young adult novels include Miss McAllister’s Ghost and Goodbye Jamie Boyd. Fensham's book for younger children, Matty Forever, was shortlisted for the Children's Book of the Year Award: Younger Readers in 2009 . The companion, Bill Rules, was published in 2010 and was shortlisted for the Queensland Premier's Literary Awards in 2011. Her third and final book in the "Matty" series, Matty and Bill for Keeps was published in 2012. She has also appeared as a guest speaker at the Melbourne Writers Festival. Melbourne theatre company 'Monkey Baa' have toured a performance version of her book Goodbye Jamie Boyd around the eastern side of Australia.

List of titles	Year
Helicopter Man	2006
Miss McAllister's Ghost	2008
Goodbye Jamie Boyd	2008
Matty Forever	2009
Bill Rules	2010
The Invisible Hero	2011
Matty And Bill For Keeps	2012
My Dog Doesn't Like Me	2015
