= Stanley Toyne =

English cricketer (1881–1962)

Personal information
- Full name: Stanley Mease Toyne
- Born: 13 June 1881; Bournemouth, Hampshire, England
- Died: 22 February 1962 (aged 80); Broxbourne, Hertfordshire, England
- Batting: Right-handed
- Bowling: Unknown-arm underarm slow
- Relatives: Herbert Hake (nephew)

Domestic team information
- Years: Team
- 1905: Hampshire
- 1928: Marylebone Cricket Club

Career statistics
Competition	First-class
Matches	2
Runs scored	17
Batting average	5.66
100s/50s	–/–
Top score	9
Catches/stumpings	2/–
- Source: Cricinfo, 12 January 2010

Stanley Mease Toyne (13 June 1881 22 February 1962) was an English first-class cricketer, educator, and historian.

The son of The Reverend Frederick Elijah Toyne, he was born at Bournemouth in June 1881. He was educated at Haileybury, where he represented the college at rackets and played for the cricket eleven. He was also head of school. From there, he matriculated as a classical exhibitioner to Hertford College, Oxford. At Oxford, he did not play cricket for Oxford University Cricket Club, but did play football for Oxford University A.F.C.. He did however play a first-class match for Hampshire against Yorkshire at Bournemouth in the 1905 County Championship, making scores of 1 and 9 in the match.

After graduating from Oxford in 1905, he was appointed an assistant master at Haileybury in 1906, an appointment he held until 1913. In 1913, he was appointed to the headmastership of St Peter's School in York, where he would remain until 1936. There, he coached the future England captain Norman Yardley. During his time at St Peter's, Toyne made a second appearance in first-class cricket, 23 years after his last, for the Marylebone Cricket Club against Ireland at Dublin in 1928. He also played field hockey for both Hertfordshire and Yorkshire. He also captained the Great Britain squash team on their first ever tour of North America in 1926. Following his retirement, he published a number of historical works to compliment those published during his teaching career, and was chairman of the Historical Association Council from 1946 to 1948. Toyne died at Broxbourne in February 1962. His nephew, Herbert Hake, was also a first-class cricketer.

== Selected works ==
- Albrecht von Wallenstein. A monograph: to which is appended an analysis of the Thirty Years War. Oxford: B. H. Blackwell. 1911.
- Mediaeval England: A framework of English history, 1066-1485. London: George Bell & Sons. 1913.
- The Angevins and the Charter (1154-1216): The Beginning of English Law, the Invasion of Ireland and the Crusades. London: George Bell & Sons. 1926.
- York Minster Historical Tracts: St. Peter's School and Alcuin. London: Society for Promoting Christian Knowledge. 1927.
- The Scandinavians in History. London: Edward Arnold. 1948.
- "Guy Fawkes and the Powder Plot". History Today. Vol. 1, no. 11. London. 1951.
- Sark, a feudal survivor. Eton: The Shakespeare Head Press. 1958.
