= James Wilson Hogg =

James Wilson Hogg MBE
- Born: 22 July 1909; Wellington, New Zealand
- Died: 6 May 1997 (aged 87); Sydney, Australia
- Education: Scots College, Wellington; Balliol College, Oxford
- Occupations: Headmaster, Trinity Grammar School (New South Wales) (1944–1974); Chairman, Headmasters' Conference of the Independent Schools of Australia (1959–1962)
- Spouse: Alyson (née Webb)
- Children: 1 son, 3 daughters

James Wilson Hogg, MBE (1909-1997) was a New Zealand-born headmaster of a CAS School in Australia and chairman of the Headmasters' Conference of the Independent Schools of Australia.

== Biography ==
Jim Hogg was born in Wellington, New Zealand, and educated at Scots College, Wellington, and New Zealand University. In 1929 he entered Balliol College, Oxford, where he read History and graduated with a Master of Arts. After teaching in the United Kingdom and New Zealand he became senior English master at Knox Grammar School in Sydney. In 1944 he was appointed Headmaster of Trinity Grammar School and remained in that position for 31 years. In 1974, he was made a Member of the Order of the British Empire for his service to education. Hogg’s youngest daughter, Elizabeth Fensham, is a children and young adults’ author.
