= Broughton House, Parramatta =

Broughton House
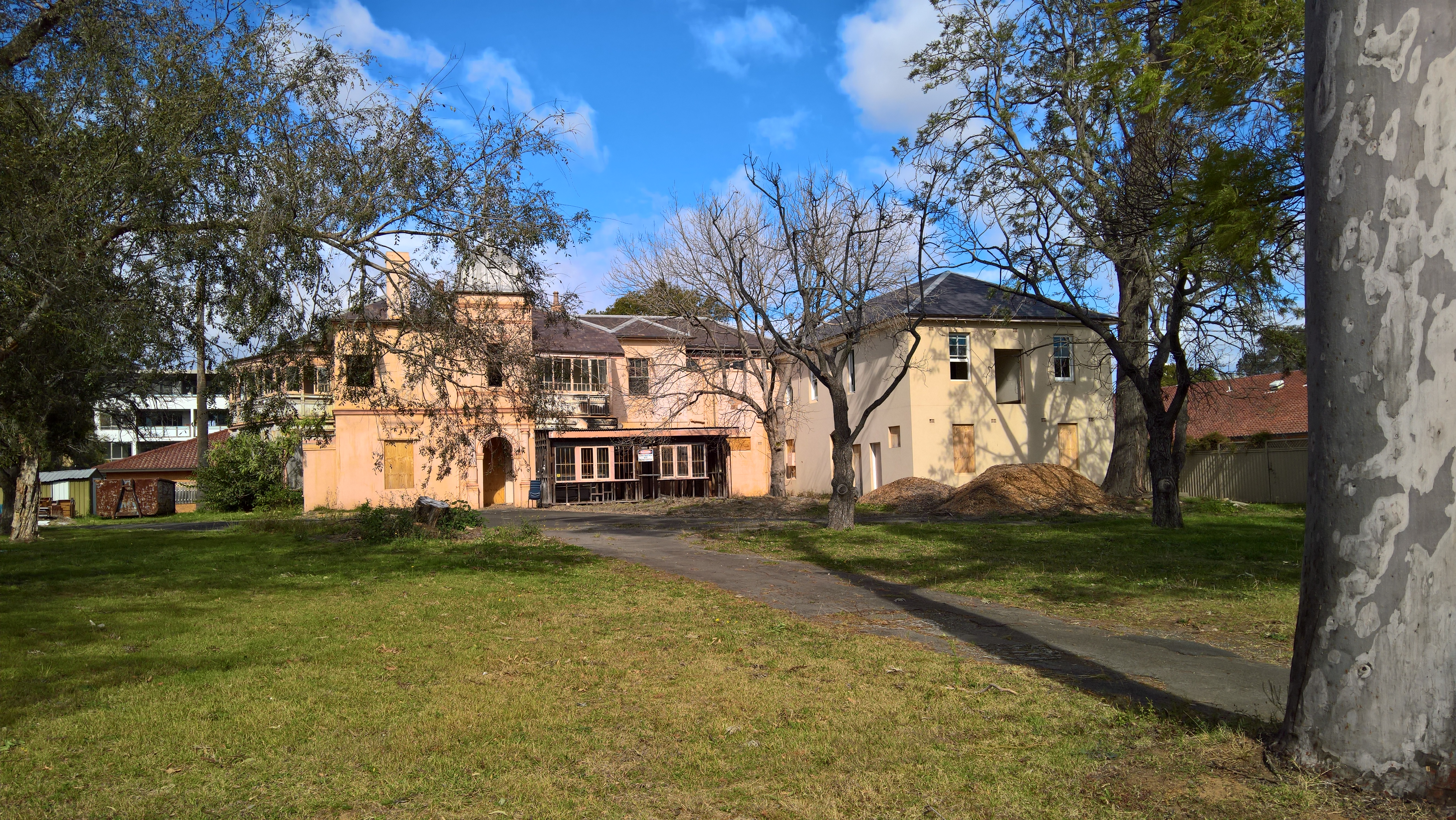
- Broughton House in August 2019

- Location within Sydney Location within Australia
- 33.8128°S 151.0162°E
- Location: 43a Thomas Street, Parramatta, Sydney, New South Wales, Australia

History
- Built: 1838–

Site notes
- Architect: John Verge (possible)

New South Wales Heritage Register
- Official name: Broughton House; Newlands; Bowden House; The Farm House; Broughton House; Parramatta Convalescent Home; Parramatta Nursing Home
- Type: state heritage (built)
- Designated: 1 October 1999
- Reference no.: 1302
- Type: Mansion
- Category: Residential buildings (private)

Broughton House is a heritage-listed former residence, school and now nursing home at 43a Thomas Street, Parramatta, Sydney, New South Wales, Australia. It was built from 1838 and was possibly designed by John Verge. It has also been known as Newlands, Bowden House, Parramatta Convalescent Home and Parramatta Nursing Home. It was added to the New South Wales State Heritage Register on 1 October 1999.

== History ==
The block on which Broughton House now stands was part of two sixty acre farms, stretching from today's Isabella Street south to the river, that were granted to two seamen from HMS Sirius, Robert Webb (c. 1762–1799) and William Reid (c. 1765–?) in March 1791, by Governor Phillip, for farming. Huts were built for them, two acres of land cleared and they were granted food, seed, agricultural tools, livestock and medical attention. Their assigned convicts were provided for from the public stores for one year.

Over the two decades, Farm No. 7 and adjacent landholdings were bought up by, and/or granted to, Samuel Marsden. The Reverend Samuel Marsden (1764–1838) was born in Yorkshire and arrived in the Colony of New South Wales as assistant to the Chaplain in March 1794. Later becoming Principal Chaplain at Parramatta, he was an ardent farmer and pastoralist and a central member of the Parramatta gentry. While his official Parramatta residence was the Parsonage (on May's Hill), built in 1817 to Francis Greenway's design, he acquired several grants of land, which he called Newlands, on the northern side of the Parramatta River.

In 1835, Marsden built a house for his daughter Jane and her husband, the Rev Thomas Marsden (cousin of Samuel).

A few kilometres east along the banks of the Parramatta River (in today's Rydalmere), Hannibal H. Macarthur had Verge design a two-storey mansion, The Vineyard, in 1835.

The north bank of the river appeared to be the preferred part of town where many quality homes were built during the 1830s. Waddon Cottage and Pemberton Grange had been erected for the Palmers. Samuel Marsden's house was the first to be named Newlands, built 1835 west of Campbell's building. Across the river, John Macarthur had enlarged Elizabeth Farm and further east along Duck River, John Blaxland had erected a two-storey mansion called Newington House.

An indenture dated 1 February 1839 transferred the property (Newlands) to Jane Marsden, daughter of the late Reverend Samuel Marsden, for 1500 pounds. Jane Marsden resided in Newlands House only for a short time, for in 1842 she sailed to England with her two children. The property was advertised seeking a tenant for a three-year lease in the Sydney Morning Herald in May 1841.

Pieter Laurentz Campbell became private secretary, aged seventeen, to Major General Sir Richard Bourke, Acting Governor of the Cape of Good Hope, in 1826. He stayed on at the Cape after Bourke's departure, joined the military in 1830 and transferred in 1832 to the 21st Regiment, destined for New South Wales. Campbell married Barbara Macleay, daughter of Colonial Secretary Alexander Macleay, in September 1834. Campbell was posted to Parramatta as Police Magistrate in October 1836. He purchased 15 acres 3 roods from Samuel Marsden's extensive grant named Newlands, district of Field of Mars, on 24 November 1837. Campbell was the Police Magistrate for Parramatta from 1836 to 1839.

Campbell had borrowed money from William Lawson of Parramatta to build his grand house in 1838/1839.

Three months after his appointment, on 1 January 1837 Campbell purchased eight acres from Rev. Samuel Marsden on the northern side of the Parramatta River, extending to the water and almost opposite Experiment Farm. Building began shortly after, as is evidenced by artist Conrad Martens' "View of Parramatta from the grounds of H. H. Macarthur" dated 25 September 1837 which depicts the very substantial two-storey residence. The house was designed by architect John Verge who, about the same time, also drew up plans for Elizabeth Bay House, for Campbell's father-in-law, Alexander Macleay. (Aside from the clues of Verge's stylistic attributes, in February 1839 Campbell applied to purchase 1048 acres on the Macleay River and this land was immediately on sold to Verge for a nominal fee. It is reasonable to assume that this was payment). In February 1838 Campbell bought another seven acres from Marsden that adjoined his earlier purchase, extending to the north to present-day Victoria Road.

The dwelling and other buildings were completed by 1 February 1839.

The Campbells took up residence in a (this new) house that stood "entirely by itself" near the "Government Paddock". The Government Paddock was a designated place and appeared on various maps from c. 1828. It was at the south-west corner of the present-day Great Western Highway and Church Street.

In February 1839, as Campbell prepared to move to Sydney to assume the office of Acting Colonial Treasurer, the property was re-acquired by the Marsden family (the Rev. Samuel Marsden had died on 12 May 1838) when Jane, his daughter, purchased it from Campbell. The transfer was done using a legal device known as a "lease and release" which in effect kept the sale secret for at least the term of the lease, in this instance, one year. It also meant that the family could continue to reside there until premises were found in the east.

Conrad Martens sketched the house, identifying it as the "House of L Campbell Esq. J.P., Parramatta, 20 March 1839". In April 1839 Campbell purchased from Martens his "View of Parramatta" which shows his house as a prominent feature of the landscape as seen from the eastern approach from the river and also the "house at Parramatta", together with a copy. In total he spent 22.1.0 pounds on the three works, a substantial sum for Campbell who was continually plagued with financial shortfalls. He was indeed proud of the house, despite the family's very limited period of occupation of only about one year.

Elizabeth Macarthur (of Elizabeth Farm south of / over the river) wrote in a letter of 6 March 1839 referring to Campbell and his family being her "near neighbours" and resident in the "new cottage on the Estate of the late Dr. Harris". Historian Sue Rosen notes that Broughton Hall was built in 1837 and designed by John Verge. She quotes Macarthur's 1839 letter further:

" Mr Riddell has two years leave of absence from his duties as Colonial Treasurer. Mr Laurentz Campbell who has been our Police Magistrate for the last three years is to take Riddell's place – & he is already gone to Sydney – His little Wife and three little ones, who are our near neighbours – & have occupied a new cottage on the Estate of the late Dr. Harris follow as soon as they can get a house in Sydney. Mr Campbell is a most vigilant & active Policy Magistrate and has kept the Town of Parramatta and its neighbourhood free from robberies and disturbances...".

The "new cottage" has been taken to mean Experiment Farm Cottage (Harris owned Experiment Farm on the River's southern bank adjoining Elizabeth Farm). Yet the Campbell residence, which was sketched in March 1839 by Conrad Martens, was located on the northern side of the river, almost opposite Experiment Farm. This house still stands, although much altered, and is currently known as Broughton House. It is located at 43A Thomas Street.

What would become Broughton House remained in Jane Marsden's name until 1876. Further research is required to establish who occupied the house from 1842 to 1864. It was possibly leased as a residence by military officers.

One of the most popular schools in Parramatta was conducted by William Woolls. He first started a school ("Mr Woolls' Academy": Gilbert, 32) at Harrisford in George Street, Parramatta, in 1842 but moved to the larger premises of Newlands in 1864 (Gilbert says "in or about 1865", noting Woolls' Harrisford Academy was remarkably successful. Never large, catering for about 30 boys at a time, it seems to have been a happy, enlightened and enlightening institution which the boys remembered with gratitude and affection). Gilbert adds that Woolls remained at Newlands for the last seven years or so of his teaching career. The school was for local boys as well as boarders. During Woolls' stay at Newlands, he continued his extensive botanical studies including botany in the school curriculum, taking the boys regularly on field trips around the hills of Parramatta collecting samples of unknown specimens. Woolls was an important early schoolmaster and botanist. He lectured frequently on the botanical landscape and was recognised by the greatest of the British and European botanists, on whose recommendation Woolls was admitted in 1865, as a Fellow of the Linnean Society of London, one of the most respected scientific organisations in Britain. In August 1872 Woolls retired from teaching and was admitted to holy orders in 1873, becoming the Rev. William Woolls.

In 1876, Thomas Kendall Bowden bought the property for 2,000 pounds (he was from a family of lawyers and Methodist Pioneers; his father was Mayor of Parramatta). He died 31 October 1879: a Trustee, William Byrnes, was appointed to act on behalf of the widow Mary Elizabeth Bowden and the property was transferred. It later became known as Bowden House. Sarah Emily Richards was the owner of Bowden House on 20 August 1897 paying 2,000 pounds.

An 1877 birds-eye view of Parramatta shows the former Campbell residence on the northern side of the river. An enlargement of the Campbell house in this view provides some indication of the scale and the detailing of the house. It also indicates a number of large trees, one of which appears tall and narrow and dark, such as an Araucaria sp. pine.

In 1906 James Swanton Vickery on behalf of S. E. Richards discharged a mortgage of 4,100 pounds on the property.

In 1908 Percival Stacy Waddy paid 3,500 pounds for the property. The house was leased to The King's School at this time. Stacy Waddy, the Headmaster on 16 September 1909, personally financed the mortgage and leased the house to the school council. The property was used to train young men in wool classing, farm management and engineering. Waddy first named the property "the Farm House" but later renamed it "Broughton House" in honour of the founder of the King's School in Australia. The property at the time (1909) was known as "The Farm House" and it was renamed "Broughton House" in 1911.

It was not until 6 June 1916 that The King's School Council bought the house and land from Waddy. The school continued until 1942 when it closed due to wartime restrictions, re-opening in 1946 and continuing until the mid-1960s.

The land was possibly subdivided at this time and house and its smaller allotment were sold. The next use of the building and grounds was as a convalescent home and maintains that use today.

The landscaped grounds preserved until at least 1951 have been built upon for other buildings associated with the nursing home. The house survives within the Parramatta Nursing Home.

Newlands was bought by Panoramic View Units Pty Ltd in December 1965 for 60,000 pounds. On 24 July 1971 the Certificate of Title was transferred to Parramatta Convalescent Home Pty Ltd and it has since been operated as a nursing home.

== Description ==
Broughton House is a two-storey Regency style stucco brick dwelling with faceted bays to three elevations. It has curved bay sections and French doors opening to verandahs, a hip roof covered in slate, and an arched entry porch rising to a tower with a metal dome topped by a weather vane. The first floor verandah bays are glassed in. There are original twin verandah posts to both levels, with a cast iron valance to the ground floor verandahs. The hall has an ornately carved timber dog-leg double staircase and return landing with elaborate timber balustrades and coffered timber ceilingi the Jacobean manner. A panelled room leads off the hall with finely carved timber fireplace and coloured panes to the twelve-paned sash windows. All the main doors have ornate pedimented architraves. The servants' wing still exists.

It is set in generous grounds with large trees giving shade and privacy. Despite the reduction in extent of its grounds and later building infill and encroachment, some remnant plantings give an idea of the grandeur of the former Newlands/Broughton Hall/House in its heyday. One mature and very tall Californian desert fan palm (Washingtonia robusta) and mature shrubs including Cotoneaster sp. and African olive (Olea europaea var. cuspidata) are near the house. Large trees include two silky oaks (Grevillea robusta), a large lemon-scented gum (Corymbia citriodora), Chinese elm (Ulmus parvifolia), paperbark (Melaleuca quinquenervia), golden Monterey cypress (Cupressus macrocarpa "Aurea Stricta", English oak (Quercus robur), Manchurian pear (Pyrus ussuriensis), bottlebrush (Callistemon, likely C. salignus) and jacaranda (Jacaranda mimosifolia).

The property has high archaeological research potential. The physical archaeological evidence within this area may include structural features, intact subfloor deposits, open deposits and scatters, ecological samples and individual artefacts which have potential to yield information about the life of Jane and Rev Thomas Marsden, relating to major historic themes including housing, persons, religion, cultural sites, land tenure, townships, agriculture and welfare. Archaeological evidence at this site is likely to be largely intact, though subject to minor disturbance in some areas.

The physical condition of the property was reported as good as at 9 June 1999, although much altered and adapted. Broughton House is largely intact. The interior retains many of the original features. Some alterations have been made to accommodate Health Department requirements. Two faceted bows to the western side have been removed.

=== Modifications and dates ===
- Originally on 20 acre lot
- Federation era – two wings added on north-west and north-east of house.
- c. 1900 – Second storey constructed.
- c. 1916 – Transfer of 7 acres 3 roods and 8 acres for town lots (Northern section)
- c. 1970 – Bays to west elevation removed for brick extension.
- 1990 – New brick single storey building at southern side of lot.
- 1992 – Brick extension to west elevation demolished leaving interior walls exposed.
- 1993–94 – Single storey buildings erected between original building and south boundary. Single storey verandahs converted to two storey at unknown date.
- 2008 – Removing, replacing and (in the central, Verge-designed oldest section) re-instating sound roofing slates. The best existing tiles taken from all over the roof and re-used. New slate to be Welsh slate to match existing colour best.

== Heritage listing ==
Broughton House is an item of State significance, being a notable example of a Victorian Regency style house that reflects the social and economic status of the wealthier free settler who played an essential part in the establishment of New South Wales. It has strong associations with the Marsden family and the King's School. It has association with educational, religious, scientific and literary training through William Woolls' School and Kings School. It is the sole remaining home of a series of quality residences which faced south over the Parramatta River such as the Vineyard (Subiaco), Newlands (Athole), Pemberton Grange and Waddon Estate (Palmer Family).

It is a picturesque house which is valued for its aesthetic attributes. It is an architecturally significant example of the Victorian Regency style. and one of the few surviving early houses of Parramatta. It is important for its close associations with the prominent Marsden family for whom it was built and with the King's School which used the house for boarding pupils between 1908 and 1965. It is also important for its historic associations with the early development of Parramatta.

Broughton House was listed on the New South Wales State Heritage Register on 1 October 1999 having satisfied the following criteria.

The place is important in demonstrating the course, or pattern, of cultural or natural history in New South Wales.

Broughton House reflects the social and economic status of the wealthier free settler who played an essential part in the establishment of New South Wales. It is associated with important Marsden family and other prominent people such as Piter Campbell, William Woolls, Thomas Bowden, Percival Waddy and the Kings School. It is associated with the early development of Parramatta.

The place is important in demonstrating aesthetic characteristics and/or a high degree of creative or technical achievement in New South Wales.

Broughton House is a notable example of a Victorian Regency style house, set in large grounds. It demonstrates the importance of location and address, being sited on the north side of Parramatta River.

The place has strong or special association with a particular community or cultural group in New South Wales for social, cultural or spiritual reasons.

Broughton House is valued by the community, which is demonstrated by their concern for its future. It has strong ties with Kings School and was a place that educated many students between 1916 and 1942.

The place has potential to yield information that will contribute to an understanding of the cultural or natural history of New South Wales.

Broughton House provides an example of the interior and exterior construction materials and decoration of its time. It has archaeological potential to reveal details about the original garden layout, remnant structures and how the property was used over time. It has been suggested that Broughton House was designed by Verge.

The place possesses uncommon, rare or endangered aspects of the cultural or natural history of New South Wales.

Broughton House is the sole remaining home of a series of quality residences which faced south over the Parramatta River such as the Vineyard (Subiaco), Newlands (Athole), Pemberton Grange and Waddon Estate (Palmer Family).

The place is important in demonstrating the principal characteristics of a class of cultural or natural places/environments in New South Wales.

Broughton House represents the type of residence constructed by the wealthier free settlers of NSW.
