= Australian College of Educators =

- ACE Coat of Arms
- Abbreviation: ACE
- Formation: 1959
- Type: Professional College
- Legal status: Company Limited by Guarantee
- Purpose: Education
- Location: Melbourne, Australia
- Members: 5500
- President: Dr Phil Lambert
- Website: www.austcolled.com.au

The Australian College of Educators (ACE) is an Australian national professional association for educators. Membership is open to all professional educators working in the early childhood, school, and tertiary education sectors, as well as to education researchers and managers. The college advocates for its members in seeking improvements in the status of the education profession.

== History ==
The college was established in 1959 as the Australian College of Education at a conference held at Geelong Grammar School at the instigation of the then-headmaster James Darling. It was renamed as the Australian College of Educators in 2002. Darling was the first National President of the ACE and was knighted for his services to education and broadcasting in 1968. The Buntine Oration, a biennial invited presentation made at the ACE conference, was established in 1960 by the four then-surviving children of Walter Murray Buntine (1866–1953) in his memory. The inaugural Buntine Oration was presented by Professor Peter Karmel, and was entitled Some Aspects of the Economics of Education.

The college has been based in Victoria for most of its existence; it did move to Canberra in 1988, though it has since returned to Melbourne was based at the Melbourne Graduate School of Education, and then became part of the Australian Council for Educational Research in 2019. The first Jean Blackburn Oration was held in 2014, given by David Gonski, author of the Gonski Report which was an important election issue in the 2013 and 2016 federal elections.

=== Buntine oration ===
Walter Buntine had a significant role in the development of education in Victoria from his position as headmaster of Caulfield Grammar School (1896–1932) and his descendants have continued to be actively involved in education. His son, M. Arnold Buntine (1898–1975), earned a PhD in education from the University of Edinburgh and was headmaster of Camberwell Grammar School in Victoria and later the Hale School in Western Australia prior to World War II after the war as headmaster of Geelong College. Arnold was married to Gladys (Jim) Buntine (1901–1992), who was an educator in her role as Chief Commissioner of the Australian Girl Guides and their son, Robert Buntine (1929–2014) had leadership roles at The King's School and Newington College in Sydney. Professor Mark Buntine of Curtin University of Technology is the most current of the Buntine family of educators.

The inaugural oration was given by Peter Karmel in 1962 at the third annual ACE conference. The oration has been given by a series of high-profile people, including Sir Paul Hasluck (Minister for External Affairs at the time, later the Governor-General of Australia), Sir Zelman Cowan (while he was Governor-General of Australia), Sir Michael Somare (then-Chief Minister of Papua New Guinea and becoming the inaugural Prime Minister on independence), Peter Doherty (Nobel Laureate in Medicine 1996 and Australian of the Year in 1997), Michael Kirby (then President of the New South Wales Court of Appeal and later a Justice of the High Court of Australia) and Robert French (then the Chancellor of Edith Cowan University and later the Chief Justice of the High Court). Inaugural ACE National President Sir James Darling gave the 1972 oration of responsibility; Barry McGaw is the only other National President to have been so honoured.

== ACE National Presidents ==
Term	President
1959–63	Sir James Darling, OBE, FACE
1963–65	Sir Harold Wyndham, CBE, FACE
1965–67	Professor Charles Moorhouse, AM, FACE
1967–69	Professor George Bassett, AM, FACE
1969–71	Dr William Radford, MBE, FACE
1971–73	Dr William Oats, OBE, FACE
1973–75	Dr Albert Jones, AO, FACE
1975–77	Richard Johnson, FACE
1977–79	Dr Haydn Williams, OBE, FACE, FAIM
1979–81	Dr Ron Browne, FACE
1981–83	Dr Eva Eden, AM, FACE
1983–85	Professor Bill Walker, AM, FACE
1985–87	Professor Peter Botsman, FACE
1987–89	Dr Shirley Randell AM, FACE, FAIM, FAICD
1989–91	Professor Phillip Hughes, FACE
1991–93	Dr Jillian Maling, AM, FACE
1993–95	Jonathan Anderson, FACE
1995–97	Professor Barry McGaw, AO, FACE, FAPS
1997–99	Susan Pascoe, AM, FACE, FACEL, FAIM, FAICD, FIPAA
1999–2001	Dr Ken Boston, FRGS, FACE, FAIM
2001–03	Elida Brereton, FACE
2003–05	Professor Geoffrey Masters, FACE
2005–07	Professor Neil Dempster, FACE
2007–09	Professor Denise Irene Bradley, AC, FACE
2009–11	Dr Lyndsay Connors AM, FACE
2011–13	Professor Robert Lingard, FACE
2014–15	Professor Stephen Dinham, OAM, FACE, FACEA, FAIM
2016–17	Hon. Bronwyn Pike, MACE
2017–18	Professor Diane Mayer, MACE
2018–20	Dr Phil Lambert, PSM FACE

== Awards ==
At the national level, the college awards Fellowships (FACE) to "highly valued and exemplary educators" and also gives a writing award to students of education and teaching. The most prestigious award from the ACE is the College Medal, awarded to one individual annually, "to acknowledge significant and distinctive contributions to the advancement of Australian education in any field, level or sector." Various awards are given by individual states and regions.
