= Buntine Oration =

The Buntine Oration is a biennial invited presentation and speech made at the conference of the Australian College of Educators (ACE). It was established in 1960 in his memory by the four children of Walter Murray Buntine who survived him: R. M. Buntine, M. A. Buntine, R. D. Buntine, and D. M. G. Wilson. The inaugural oration was given by Peter Karmel (who had, himself, attended Caulfield Grammar School from 1929 to 1939) in 1962 at the third annual ACE conference and the most recent was in 2008.

== Buntine family ==
Walter Buntine (1866–1953) had a significant role in the development of education in the Australian state of Victoria from his position as headmaster of Caulfield Grammar School (1896–1932). His son, M. Arnold Buntine (1898–1975), was an Australian rules footballer who played with St Kilda before studying education and earning a PhD from the University of Edinburgh. Prior to World War II, Arnold was headmaster of Camberwell Grammar School in Victoria and then the Hale School in Western Australia. He served at Tobruk and in Syria as a captain in the 2/28th Battalion. Ultimately rising to Lieutenant-Colonel, he led the 2/11th Battalion. He returned to the Hale School in 1944, returning to Victoria in 1945 as headmaster of Geelong College. Arnold was married to Gladys (Jim) Buntine (1901–1992), who was the chief commissioner of the Australian Girl Guides from 1962 until 1968 and an advocate for the importance of education. She was awarded first an OBE and later an MBE for her services to youth. Robert Buntine (1929–2014), their son, had leadership roles at the King's School and Newington College in Sydney. Mark Buntine of Curtin University of Technology is the most current of the Buntine family of educators.

== List of orations ==
The Buntine Oration has been delivered by many highly recognised people. Paul Hasluck was the Australian minister for external affairs at the time he delivered the 1964 oration, going on to become governor-general of Australia in 1969. Zelman Cowen was the governor-general at the time of the 1980 oration. Michael Somare was elected to the first national parliament of Papua New Guinea in 1972, becoming chief minister by the time of the 1974; he became the country's first prime minister when independence was granted in 1975. 2006 orator Peter Doherty shared the 1996 Nobel Prize in Physiology or Medicine and was the 1997 Australian of the Year. Two High Court justices have given the oration (Robert French and Michael Kirby), as has the chancellor of the Australian National University ("Nugget" Coombs) and the inaugural president of the ACE, James Darling.

Year	Orator	Topic	References
1962	Peter H. Karmel AC, CBE	Some Economic Aspects of Education	
1964	Sir Paul M. C. Hasluck KG, GCMG, GCVO	Australia and its Neighbours	
1966	Percy H. Partridge	Some Problems of Educational Policy in Democratic Societies	
1968	Sir John G. Crawford AC, CBE	The Accountability of Universities	
1970	H. C. "Nugget" Coombs	Human Values – Education in the Changing Australian Society	
1972	Sir James R. Darling OBE, CBE, FACE	Responsibility	
1974	Sir Michael T. Somare GCL, GCMG, CH, CF, SSI, KSG, PC, MP	Education for Self-Reliance	
1976	Hugh R. Hudson MHA	The Political Economy of Educational Advancement	
1978	Barbara Falk	Personal Identity Making in Australia	
1980	Sir Zelman Cowan AK, GCMG, GCVO, QC	Politics in Education	
1982	Kwong Lee Dow AM	Education Policy Making in Australia	
1984	Michael D. Kirby AC, CMG	Education – On Hanging In There	
1986	Hedley Beare AM	Shared Meanings About Education: The Economic Paradigm Considered	
1988	Di Yerbury AO	The Tradition of Scholarly Excellence	
1990	Stephen A. FitzGerald AO	Asia, Education, and the Australian Mind	
1992	K. J. Austin Asche AC, QC	The Literacy Imperative	
1994	Paige H. Porter	Women and Leadership in Education: The Construction of Gender in the Workplace	
1996	Robert S. French AC	Educating for Democracy in the Twenty First Century	
1997	Frances H. Christie	Literacy Research and Teaching: Paradigms for the Late Twentieth Century	
1998	Millicent E. Poole	Re-Framing Higher Education: Mind the Market	
1999	Alan Ruby	Difference is the Essence of Humanity	
2000	Barry McGaw AO, FACE	International Comparisons of Expenditure in Education	
2001	Swee-Hin Toh	Uprooting Violence, Growing Peace: Education for Compassionate Citizenship	
2003	Stephanie Young	Passive Consumers or Co-creators – Listening to Learners?	
2004	Stephen Downes	Learning Networks	
2006	Peter C. Doherty AC, FRS, FMedSci	The Education Challenge for a Knowledge Economy	
2008	Joseph Lo Bianco	Imagination, Inspiration, Innovation	
