= Currumbin Wildlife Sanctuary railway =

Miniature railway line in Queensland, Australia

Coordinates: 28.135°S 153.488°E

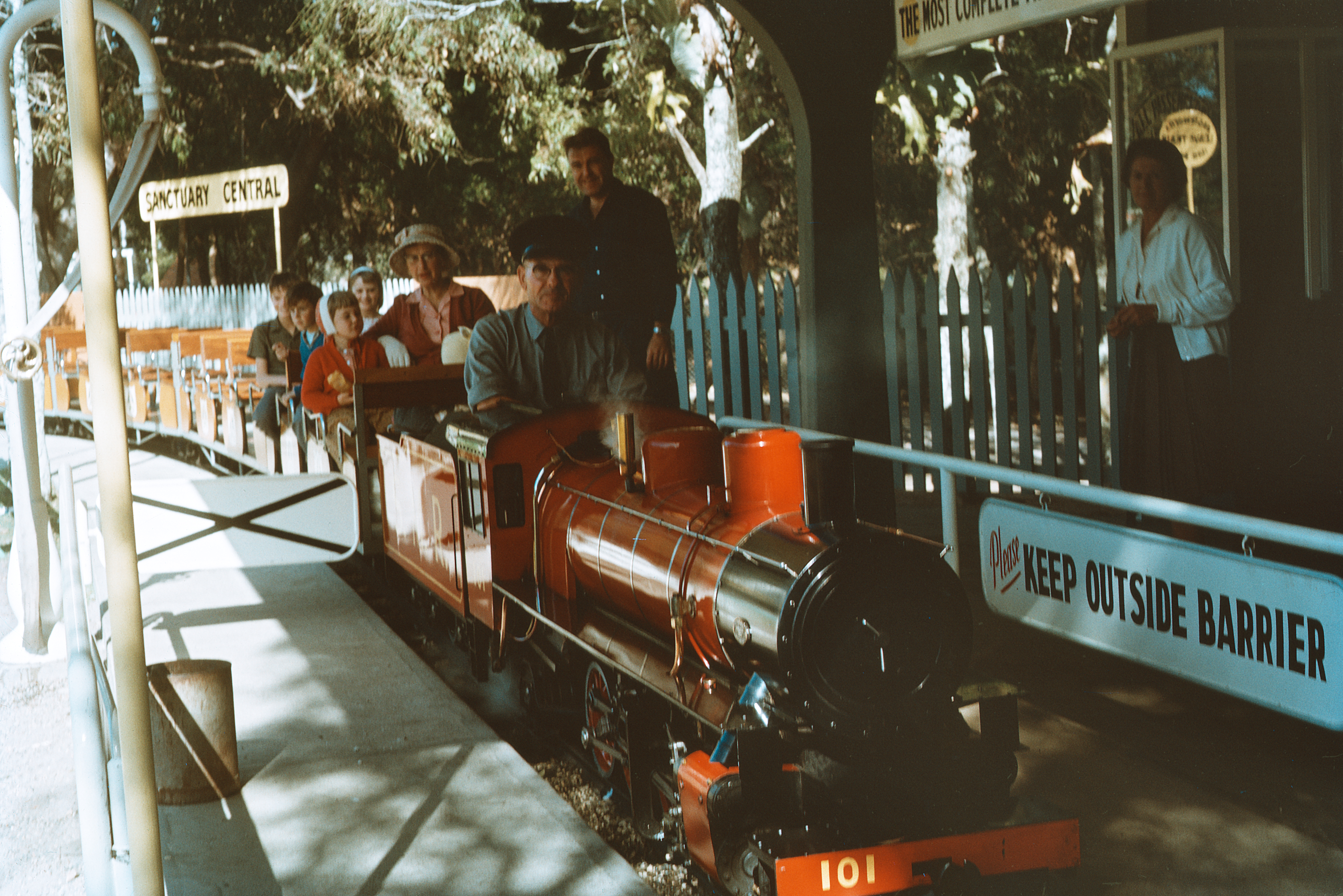
- Train at Central station in July 1964

Overview
- Owner: Currumbin Wildlife Sanctuary
- Locale: Currumbin, Queensland
- Stations: 4

Service
- Type: Miniature railway
- Rolling stock: 4

History
- Opened: June 1964; 62 years ago

Technical
- Track length: 2.5 km (1.6 mi)
- Track gauge: 11 inches (28 cm)

The Currumbin Wildlife Sanctuary railway is a 2.5-kilometre (1.6 mi) miniature railway located inside the Currumbin Wildlife Sanctuary in the Gold Coast suburb of Currumbin. It includes four stations and four locomotives that can pull nine carriages, carrying up to 70 people at a time.

== History ==
In 1964, Alex Griffiths – the founder of the Currumbin Wildlife Sanctuary (known at the time as the Currumbin Bird Sanctuary) – requested the construction of a steam locomotive and miniature railway which would navigate the sanctuary. The locomotive was built in Brisbane by engineer James Jackson and opened in June 1964. It hauled six passenger carriages and operated on an eleven-inch gauge rail loop for 300 metres (980 ft).

The railway was extended as part of the sanctuary's expansion in 1974, running under the Gold Coast Highway, with a new diesel locomotive – a replica of Commonwealth Railways GM1 – built to haul an additional eight carriages. Replicas of Queensland Railways DH44 and Sandy River Railroad Number 24 were added to the line in 1986 and 1994 respectively.

As part of the sanctuary's celebrations to honour 100 years since Griffiths was born, the original steam locomotive was rebuilt and resumed service in 2011. Coal for the locomotive is donated by the Queensland Museum Rail Workshops in Ipswich.
