= Jean Edna Blackburn =

Australian educationalist

- Born: 14 July 1919; Melbourne
- Died: 2 December 2001; Adelaide
- Occupations: Pedagogue, chancellor (1990–)
- Awards: Officer of the Order of Australia (For distinguished service of a high degree to education., Mrs Jean Edna BLACKBURN, 1976); Victorian Honour Roll of Women (2002)

Jean Edna Blackburn AO (née Muir, 14 July 1919 – 2 December 2001) was an Australian educationalist.

She became an advocate for quality teaching and resources in Australia, working on the Committee of Inquiry into South Australian Education in 1969-1970. In 1972, she was appointed as deputy chairperson of an interim committee for the Australian Schools Commission, which produced the influential Schools in Australia report in 1973. Blackburn was a full-time member of the commission from 1974 to 1980, during which time she was associated with the Disadvantaged Schools Program. She later chaired a Ministerial Review of post-compulsory schooling in Victoria and the Victorian Board of Education. Blackburn was the first chancellor of the University of Canberra, appointed in 1990. She was awarded an AO twice, returning her first award in protest, and was posthumously inducted into the Victorian Honour Roll of Women in 2002.

== Education ==
Blackburn attended the University of Melbourne, graduating with a Bachelor of Arts majoring in Economics in 1940.

== Career ==
After completing a Diploma of Education, Blackburn pursued a career in education firstly working as a high school teacher in Adelaide. Her work in education soon extended to becoming an advocate for quality teaching and resources for children being educated in Australia, which saw her working as a consultant on the Committee of Inquiry into South Australian Education in 1969 and 1970, chaired by Peter Karmel.

In December 1972, Blackburn was appointed as deputy chairperson of an interim committee for the Australian Schools Commission, also chaired by Karmel. The commission had been established to advise the Australian federal government on Commonwealth assistance within the 1973 budget. Several months later, Australian Prime Minister Gough Whitlam appointed Blackburn as the full-time deputy chairperson of the committee, at Karmel's suggestion. The committee produced the Schools in Australia report in 1973 which influenced and addressed the need for federal government funding for state schools.

In 1974, Minister for Education Kim Beazley Sr. appointed Blackburn as a full-time member of the Australian Schools Commission. During her time as an active commission member, Blackburn was associated with the Disadvantaged Schools Program, which released the report Girls, School and Society, released in 1975.

Blackburn resigned from the Australian Schools Commission in 1980 as she believed the social philosophies which the commission had been founded on were no longer being followed. Blackburn also criticised the government's decision not to re-appoint the chairperson of the commission, Ken McKinnon. She said she was "mad with rage" because McKinnon had worked well beyond the call of duty in stimulating discussion about education.

From 1983 until 1985, Blackburn chaired a Ministerial Review of post-compulsory schooling in Victoria. From 1991 to 1992, Blackburn chaired the Victorian Board of Education. She was also the founding chairperson of the South Australian Suffrage Centenary Committee from 1992 until 1993.

On 19 April 1990, Governor-General Bill Hayden installed Blackburn as the first chancellor of the University of Canberra. Blackburn's appointment at the second meeting of the university's council was made amid a dispute about whom to nominate to two council positions allocated to ACT Government nominees.

== Honours ==
Blackburn was awarded an AO in the 1976 Australia Day Honours for her distinguished service of a high degree to education. However, Blackburn returned it in protest of the government's decision to create knighthoods within the honour. Author Patrick White, public servant Nugget Coombs and Brotherhood of St Laurence director David Scott had also returned their honours in protest.

Blackburn was again awarded an AO in the 1995 Australia Day Honours for services to the development of education in Australia.

In 2002, Blackburn was posthumously inducted into the Victorian Honour Roll of Women.

In 2014, the inaugural Australian College of Educators' Jean Blackburn Oration was delivered by David Gonski at the University of Melbourne.
