= Alex Griffiths =

Alex Griffiths may refer to:

- Alex Griffiths (cricketer) (born 2002), Welsh cricketer
- Alex Griffiths (environmentalist) (1911–1998), Australian beekeeper and environmentalist
