= 1976 Australia Day Honours =

The 1976 Australia Day Honours were announced on 26 January 1976 by the Governor General of Australia, Sir John Kerr.

The Australia Day Honours are the first of the two major annual honours lists, announced on Australia Day (26 January), with the other being the Queen's Birthday Honours which are announced on the second Monday in June.

== Order of Australia ==
=== Companion (AC) ===
==== Civil Division ====
Recipient	Citation	Notes
Sir Bernard Thomas Heinze	For eminent achievement and merit of the highest degree in the field of music.	
Ronald Gordon Jackson	For eminent achievement and merit of the highest degree in the fields of industry and business management.	
Professor Peter Henry Karmel CBE	For eminent achievement and merit of the highest degree in the field of education.	
Kenneth Baillieu Myer DSC	For eminent achievement and merit of the highest degree in the fields of the arts and public service and in particular, to the development of library based information systems.	
Emeritus Professor Arthur Dale Trendall CMG	For eminent achievement and merit of the highest degree in services to Australian Universities and to the study of the Humanities.	

==== Military Division ====
Recipient	Citation	Notes
Vice-Admiral Hugh David Stevenson CBE	For eminent service in duties of great responsibility.	

=== Officer (AO) ===
==== Civil Division ====
Recipient	Citation	Notes
Arthur Bassingthwaite	For distinguished service of a high degree in the field of primary industry.	
Harold Leigh Beaney	For distinguished public service of a high degree.	
Jean Edna Blackburn	For distinguished service of a high degree to education.	
Dr John Frederick Joseph Cade	For distinguished service of a high degree in the field of medicine.	
Edward John Carey	For distinguished public service of a high degree.	
Thomas Kingston Critchley CBE	For distinguished public service of a high degree.	
Ronald Dowd	For distinguished service of a high degree to opera.	
Arthur Frederik Alan Harper	For distinguished public service of a high degree in the field of metric conversion.	
Clem Jones	For distinguished service of a high degree in the fields of public service and local government.	
Dr Menzie Lipson	For distinguished service of a high degree to science, particularly in the field of wool textile research.	
Alan McLeod McCulloch	For distinguished service of a high degree in the artistic field, particularly in the promotion of art and as an art historian.	
Dr Donald Metcalf	For distinguished service of a high degree to medical research.	
Dr Raymond Milton Moore	For distinguished service of a high degree to science, particularly in the field of ecology.	
John Wesley Poulton	For distinguished service of a high degree to the electrical industry.	
Dr William Cropley Radford	For distinguished service of a high degree to education.	
Tulloch Llewelyn Roberts	For distinguished service of a high degree to the community and in the field of primary industry.	
Right Reverend Ian Wotton Allnutt Shevill	For distinguished service of a high degree to the community.	
Donald John George Strang	For distinguished service of a high degree to commerce and in the field of industrial relations.	
Wilfrid Coad Thomas	For distinguished service of a high degree to the media, particularly in the field of radio broadcasting.	
Emeritus Professor Wilfred Asquith Townsley	For distinguished academic service of a high degree.	
Emeritus Professor Eric John Underwood CBE	For distinguished academic service of a high degree, particularly in the fields of agriculture and education.	
Professor Robert John Walsh OBE	For distinguished service of a high degree in the field of science, particularly medical research.	

==== Military Division ====
Recipient	Citation	Notes
Surgeon Rear Admiral J.A.B. Cotsell QHP, MRCS, LRCP	For distinguished service in responsible positions	
Major General W.G. Henderson DSO, OBE	For distinguished service in responsible positions	
Air Vice-Marshal J.C. Jordan	For distinguished service in responsible positions	
Major General J.M.L. Macdonald MBE, ED	For distinguished service in responsible positions	
Rear Admiral A.G. McFarlane	For distinguished service in responsible positions	
Brigadier J.A. Munro	For distinguished service in responsible positions	
Air Vice-Marshal R. Noble	For distinguished service in responsible positions	
Brigadier W.J. Norrie OBE	For distinguished service in responsible positions	
Air Vice-Marshal F.S. Robey CBE	For distinguished service in responsible positions	

=== Member (AM) ===
==== Civil Division ====
Recipient	Citation	Notes
Ronald George Bennett	For service to the community.	
Harold Blair	For service to the Aboriginal community and in the field of music.	
Lillian E. Caelli	For service to the community and in the field of sport.	
Matron Gwenda Elaine Canning	For service in the field of nursing.	
Dudley John Carter	For service to youth.	
Alderman Kenneth Reuben Cavanough	For service to the community and to local government.	
Councillor Charles Henry Chiswell	For service to the community and local government.	
Frederick George Cottrell	For service to the welfare of ex-servicemen and women.	
Ray Neil Crawford	For service to sport of rodeo.	
Grace Crowley	For service to art.	
Matilda Christina de Vere	For service to the community.	
Lena Dobbin	For service to the community.	
Francis Patrick Donovan	For public service, particularly in the field of trade promotion.	
Dr Brian Robinson Elliott	For academic service in the field of Australian literature.	
Richard Dyason Ferris	For service to medicine.	
Dr John Allan Forbes	For service to medicine.	
Alan Charles Frost	For service to the community and local government.	
Richard Gaensler JP	For service to the community.	
Edwin Charles Gifford	For service to the community.	
Mary Elizabeth Gilchrist	For public service.	
Maxwell Alexander Gray	For service to youth.	
Alexander Morris Griffiths	For service to conservation.	
Keith John Griggs	For service to the community.	
Councillor Clarence Henry Hall	For service to the community and to local government.	
Raymond Hanson	For service to music.	
Sidney Jones Hayes	For service to the community, particularly in the field of sport.	
Sidney Frank Heaslip	For service to the community and in the field of primary industry.	
Vernon Clifford Henderson	For service to the community and local government.	
Olive Rosaine Hine	For service to the community.	
Dr D'Arcy Kelly	For service to medicine and to the community.	
Dr Lorna Ince King	For public service in the field of medicine.	
Dr Albert Lacey	For service to the community.	
Donald Ernest Leggett	For service to the community and to local government.	
Catherine Agnes McEwan	For service to the community.	
Robert Bruce MacKenzie	For public service in the field of housing.	
Keith J. McKinnon	For service to the community.	
Commissioner William James McLaren	For public service, particularly in association with the Darwin Relief Operation in 1974.	
Estelle Yvonne McMinn JP	For service to the community and to sport.	
Kathleen Jean Menzies	For service to the community.	
Lois O'Donoghue	For service to the Aboriginal community in South Australia.	
Trevor Brian Prescott	For service to commerce and to the community.	
Cecil John Seddon Purdy	For service to chess.	
Erwin Aladar Rado	For service to the film industry.	
Carl Edward Rector	For service to the community and to sport, particularly surf life-saving.	
Reverend Laurie Reece	For service in the field of Aboriginal studies.	
Hubert Staner Reilly	For service to the community.	
George Seelaf	For service to the community and to the trade union movement.	
James Wesley Blackwell Semple	For service to the community particularly youth.	
Vincent Serventy	For service to preservation, particularly in the field of the preservation of wildlife.	
John Shaw	For public service in the field of civil aviation.	
Leslie Rosemary Taylor	For service to the community and in the field of international relations.	
Maida Thomas	For service to the community.	
Gerorge Underwood	For public service and service to the community	
Margaret Joan Voller	For service to the community.	
Margaret Leitch Walker	For service to the community, particularly in the fields of child health and children's welfare.	
May Hilda Walsh	For service to the community.	
Horace Ward	For service to the community.	
Felix Werder	For service to music.	
Peter Whallin	For service to the hotel industry.	
Detective Sergeant James Arthur Joseph Wilson	For service to the community, particularly to youth.	
Norma Dorothy Young	For service to the community.	

==== Military Division ====
Recipient	Citation	Notes
Major J.E.S. Alwyn	For exceptional service or performance of duty.	
Warrant Officer Air Technical Aircraft L.E.A. Bolden	For exceptional service or performance of duty.	
Squadron Leader L.D. Brown	For exceptional service or performance of duty.	
Colonel R.O. Brown ED	For exceptional service or performance of duty.	
Warrant Officer G.P. Buckham	For exceptional service or performance of duty.	
Sergeant F.B. Cahill	For exceptional service or performance of duty.	
Captain G.P. Corlis	For exceptional service or performance of duty.	
Warrant Officer Marine Technical Hull L.D. Durston	For exceptional service or performance of duty.	
Flight Sergeant A.J. Elshaw	For exceptional service or performance of duty.	
Warrant Officer W.L. Garrad	For exceptional service or performance of duty.	
Commander S.A Hall RAN	For exceptional service or performance of duty.	
Lieutenant Colonel A.W. Hammett	For exceptional service or performance of duty.	
Warrant Officer Coxswain D.V. Harper	For exceptional service or performance of duty.	
Flight Sergeant R.J. Heffernan	For exceptional service or performance of duty.	
Lieutenant Commander R.W.H. Holister, RANEM	For exceptional service or performance of duty.	
Warrant Officer L.J. Irlam	For exceptional service or performance of duty.	
Colonel D.R. Leslie ED	For exceptional service or performance of duty.	
Major G.L. Mansford	For exceptional service or performance of duty.	
Lieutenant Colonel R.A.H. McCluskey	For exceptional service or performance of duty.	
Wing Commander G.J. Moore	For exceptional service or performance of duty.	
Warrant Officer 2 P.F. Moravic	For exceptional service or performance of duty.	
Warrant Officer Radar Pilot R.J. Morris	For exceptional service or performance of duty.	
Warrant Officer G.W. O'Brien	For exceptional service or performance of duty.	
Corporal E. Pinoli	For exceptional service or performance of duty.	
Squadron Leader N. McN. Pollock	For exceptional service or performance of duty.	
Major P.H.B. Pritchard	For exceptional service or performance of duty.	
Warrant Officer 2 D.C.V Pye	For exceptional service or performance of duty.	
Chaplain R.J.L. Quirk MBE	For exceptional service or performance of duty.	
Warrant Officer 2 J.F. Reid	For exceptional service or performance of duty.	
Flight Lieutenant R.J. Rider	For exceptional service or performance of duty.	
Commander R.P. Rodriguez RD, RANR	For exceptional service or performance of duty.	
Sergeant P.J. Short	For exceptional service or performance of duty.	
Lieutenant E.C. Swinnerton RAN	For exceptional service or performance of duty.	
Sergeant H. Taylor	For exceptional service or performance of duty.	
Warrant Officer 1 I.A. Thomson	For exceptional service or performance of duty.	
Warrant Officer Survey Recorder D. Waining	For exceptional service or performance of duty.	
Squadron Leader E.J. Walker	For exceptional service or performance of duty.	
Colonel W.H. Wansley	For exceptional service or performance of duty.	
Warrant Officer J.B. Webster	For exceptional service or performance of duty.	
