= Currumbin Wildlife Sanctuary =

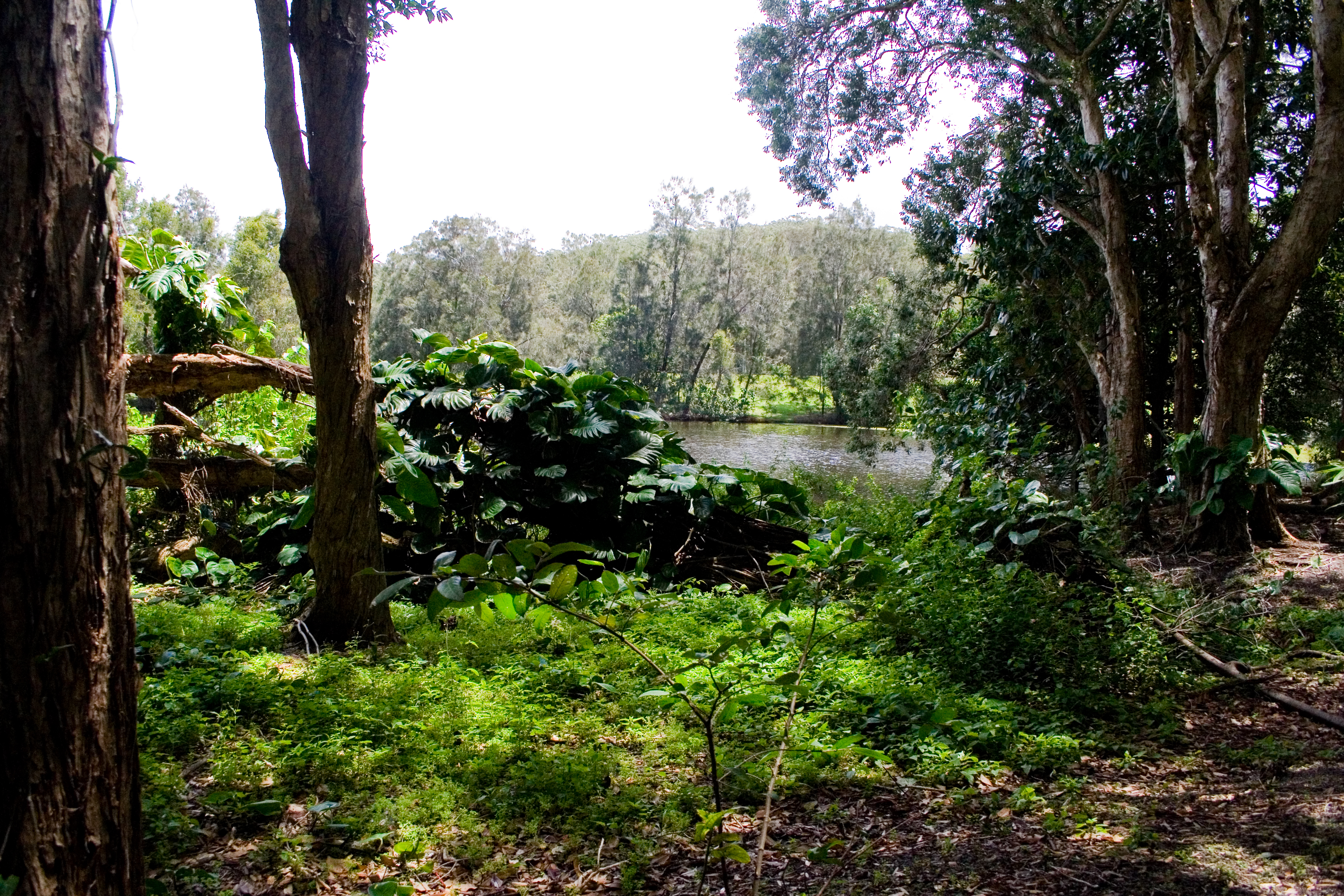
- Currumbin Wildlife Sanctuary

- Location within Queensland Location within Australia
- 28.135°S 153.488°E
- Location: 28 Tomewin Street, Currumbin, Queensland, Australia

History
- Built: 1947 onwards

Queensland Heritage Register
- Official name: Currumbin Wildlife Sanctuary
- Type: state heritage (landscape, built)
- Designated: 18 September 2009
- Reference no.: 602720
- Significant period: 1947 onwards
- Significant components: watercourse – creek, aviary, animal enclosure/s, pens/cages, trees – remnant scrub, zoological garden, miniature tram/train, other – recreation/entertainment: component

Currumbin Wildlife Sanctuary
- Interactive map of Currumbin Wildlife Sanctuary
- Date opened: 1947
- Location: Currumbin, Gold Coast, Queensland, Australia
- Website: www.currumbinsanctuary.com.au

Currumbin Wildlife Sanctuary is a heritage-listed zoological garden at 28 Tomewin Street, Currumbin, Queensland, Australia. It was built in 1947 onwards. It was added to the Queensland Heritage Register on 18 September 2009. The sanctuary is world-renowned for its feeding of huge flocks of free-flying wild rainbow lorikeets, which come to the sanctuary to feast off the special mixture which the lorikeets eat.

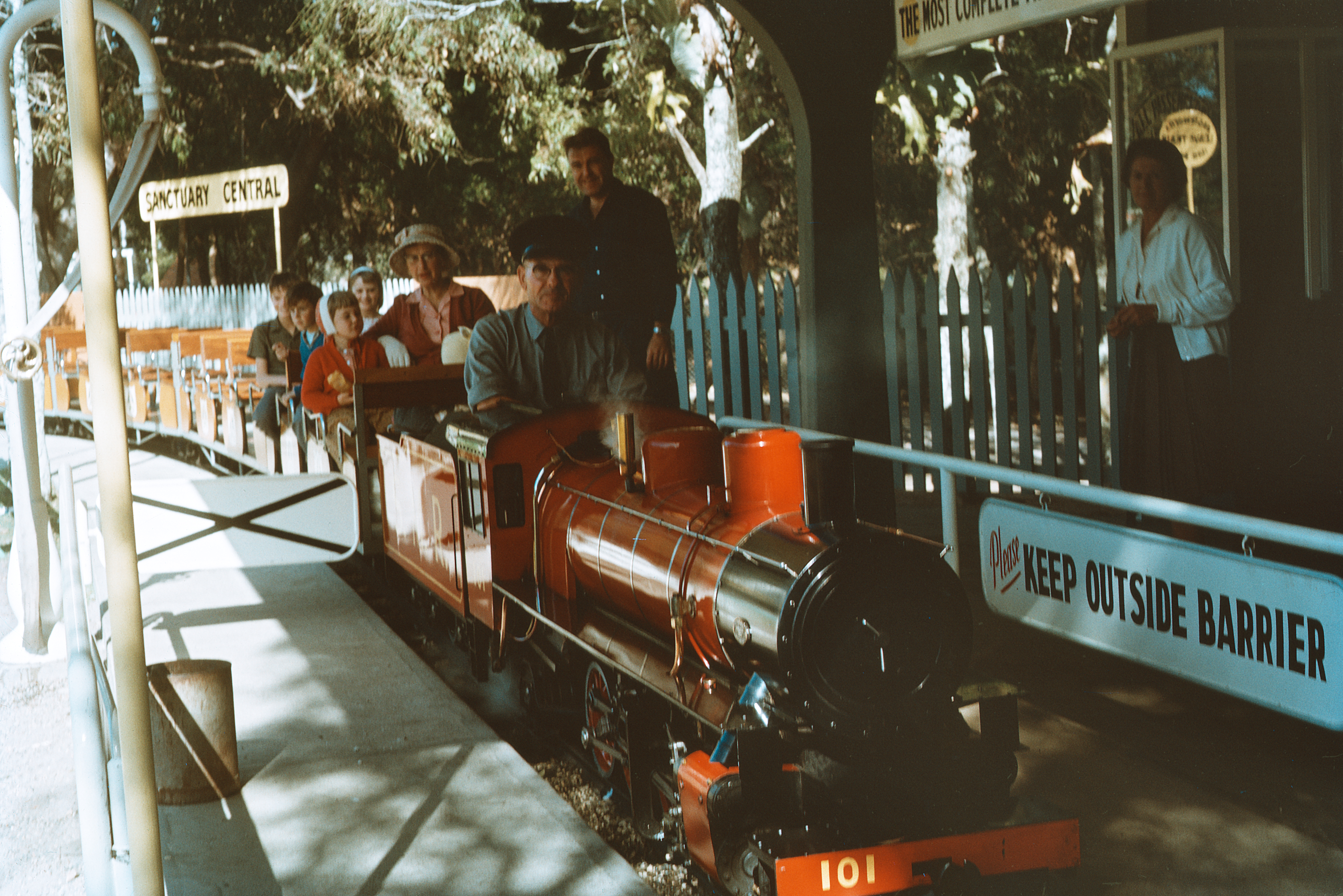
Miniature train, Currumbin Sanctuary, July 1964

The sanctuary was opened in 1947 by Alex Griffiths as the Currumbin Bird Sanctuary, originally intended to divert local lorikeets from damaging his flower crops. It has since become a major nature-based tourist attraction, known for daily lorikeet feeding and one of the largest collections of Australian native species in the world. The site includes a miniature railway (operating since 1964), a wildlife hospital, and newer exhibits such as the Lost Valley precinct, which opened in 2017.

Currumbin Wildlife Sanctuary is significant for its role in the evolution of nature-based tourism in Queensland, having grown from a local lorikeet-feeding attraction established by Alex Griffiths in 1947 into an internationally recognised site and one of the earliest surviving tourist facilities on the Gold Coast. It holds strong social value for generations of Queenslanders, reflected in its longstanding presence in tourism campaigns, public support against nearby development in the 1950s, and inclusion in Queensland’s 150th anniversary celebrations. The sanctuary is also closely associated with Griffiths' life work.

== History ==
The Currumbin Wildlife Sanctuary was established in 1947 by beekeeper and floriculturist Alex Griffiths as a small-scale tourism venture centered on lorikeet-feeding displays. Initially informal, it gained popularity throughout the 1950s, becoming known as the Currumbin Bird Sanctuary by at least 1953. By the mid-1950s, it had become a major attraction on the South Coast, drawing thousands of visitors during holiday periods. Griffiths did not charge admission but accepted donations, and he also became known locally as a wildlife carer. It was the first tourism venture in the region to showcase fauna in an essentially natural setting.

In the 1950s, Griffiths expanded the site by acquiring additional land and using adjacent public reserves. In 1956, public opposition led by Griffiths helped defeat a sand-mining proposal along Flat Rock Creek. That same year, National Geographic photographer Paul Zahl documented the lorikeet-feeding spectacle, giving the sanctuary international attention. By then, Griffiths was also caring for injured wildlife and had a growing collection of native animals.

Major expansion occurred during the 1960s. In 1964, Griffiths introduced a miniature railway, built a rock shop showcasing minerals and jewellery, and added a butterfly display. These additions followed a consistent octagonal architectural style, later echoed in other structures. In 1968, he acquired 18.7 hectares of land west of the Gold Coast Highway, later known as the Western Reserve, where he planned to develop aviaries, lagoons for waterbirds, and a railway extension. A tunnel under the highway was constructed in 1974 to link the original site with the new reserve.

By the early 1970s, the sanctuary featured a kiosk, fernery, lorikeet-feeding arena, rock shop and annex, aviaries, aquarium, and children’s play areas. In 1972, a new three-storey octagonal kiosk was completed, featuring a mural by Queensland artist Hugh Sawrey. That year, Griffiths began seeking an organization to manage the sanctuary long-term and entered negotiations with the National Trust of Queensland.

In 1976, Griffiths formally gifted the sanctuary to the Trust. The Currumbin Bird Sanctuary Act 1976 enabled the transfer of properties and the winding up of Griffiths’ companies, which were dissolved in early 1977 so the sanctuary could operate as a commercial venture. The properties were transferred in March 1978. Griffiths was appointed lifetime chair of a Board of Advice, but later stepped aside in favour of retired Governor of Queensland Sir Colin Hannah, succeeded by Sir Sholto Douglas. In 1980, the Trust prepared a development plan focused on modernizing the site and removing outdated structures, particularly old aviaries. That same year, the Board of Advice was discontinued, ending Griffiths’ formal advisory role.

The 1976 act reflected both the Trust's commercial objectives and Griffiths' original vision of the sanctuary as a flora and fauna reserve. However, philosophical differences soon emerged. The Trust adopted a scientific approach that discouraged artificial feeding and the keeping of exotic species, while Griffiths continued to maintain a more informal approach and housed exotic birds such as peacocks at Coolamon, a 17.8-hectare property he had acquired in the Currumbin Valley. From around 1982, he resided there in a caravan and developed the property with dams, spillways, and a bridge.

During the 1980s and 1990s, the Trust undertook extensive redevelopment. Additions included a children’s playground (1985–86), refurbishment of the Rainforest Aviary (1987), a Sub-Tropical Aviary (1988), the Sir Walter Campbell Environmental Education Centre, a koala exhibit, the Koala Junction Kiosk, a crocodile display, and aviaries for cockatoos and Tasmanian devils. Flora Gully was also established to feature rare and endangered plants. The Trust also renovated the main administration building, expanded the Kiosk to include a shop, and modified aviaries. These developments are not considered part of the site's cultural heritage significance.

In 1995, the Trust adopted a long-term goal to position Currumbin Wildlife Sanctuary as a nationally and internationally recognised leader in the preservation and presentation of Australian fauna and flora. The name was formally changed that year to reflect this aim. Visitor numbers in 1996 included 82,000 local, 96,000 interstate, and 340,000 international tourists.

Alex Griffiths died in 1998. He had been appointed a Member of the Order of Australia in 1976, received the Order of the White Cross in 1977, and was granted the Freedom of the City of the Gold Coast in 1989. He was awarded an honorary doctorate by Griffith University in 1995, and in 1999 a local park was named in his honour.

By the time of the 1976 gift, core facilities included the Kiosk, the Spirit of the Outback Store (former Rock Shop) and its annex, the miniature railway (particularly its original circuit and the Western Reserve loop), the Rainforest Pool Aviary, the lorikeet-feeding arena, and a small octagonal structure possibly used as a bird hospital. These elements, along with remnant vegetation retained as part of Griffiths' flora reserve concept, remain within the heritage boundary.

The sanctuary’s ongoing local importance was acknowledged in the 1997 Gold Coast Urban Heritage and Character Study, and it was later recognized as one of Queensland’s top 15 iconic locations during the state’s Q150 sesquicentenary celebrations. In 2009, the sanctuary was listed on the Queensland Heritage Register for its historical and cultural significance.

== Description ==
The extent of land included within the heritage boundary for the Currumbin Wildlife Sanctuary encompasses 39.6 hectares of heritage-listed freehold land and 5.2 hectares of leasehold along Flat Rock Creek and beneath the Gold Coast Highway. The heritage boundary includes properties gifted to the National Trust of Queensland in 1976 but excludes freehold properties acquired by the Trust after March 1978. The listing comprises two areas: the main sanctuary in Currumbin, intersected by the Gold Coast Highway, and a separate property known as Coolamon, located over nine kilometres to the southwest in the Currumbin Valley, adjacent to the Nicoll Scrub National Park.

Within the main sanctuary, only structures and features associated with founder Alex Griffiths’ management prior to 1976 are considered of cultural heritage significance. These include early components of the miniature railway, the 1972 Kiosk building, the former Rock Shop and annex (1964–65), the lorikeet-feeding arena on its original site, early aviaries, and the pedestrian and rail tunnel constructed circa 1974.

Other later developments, such as animal enclosures and themed playground sculptures, are not included in the heritage significance.

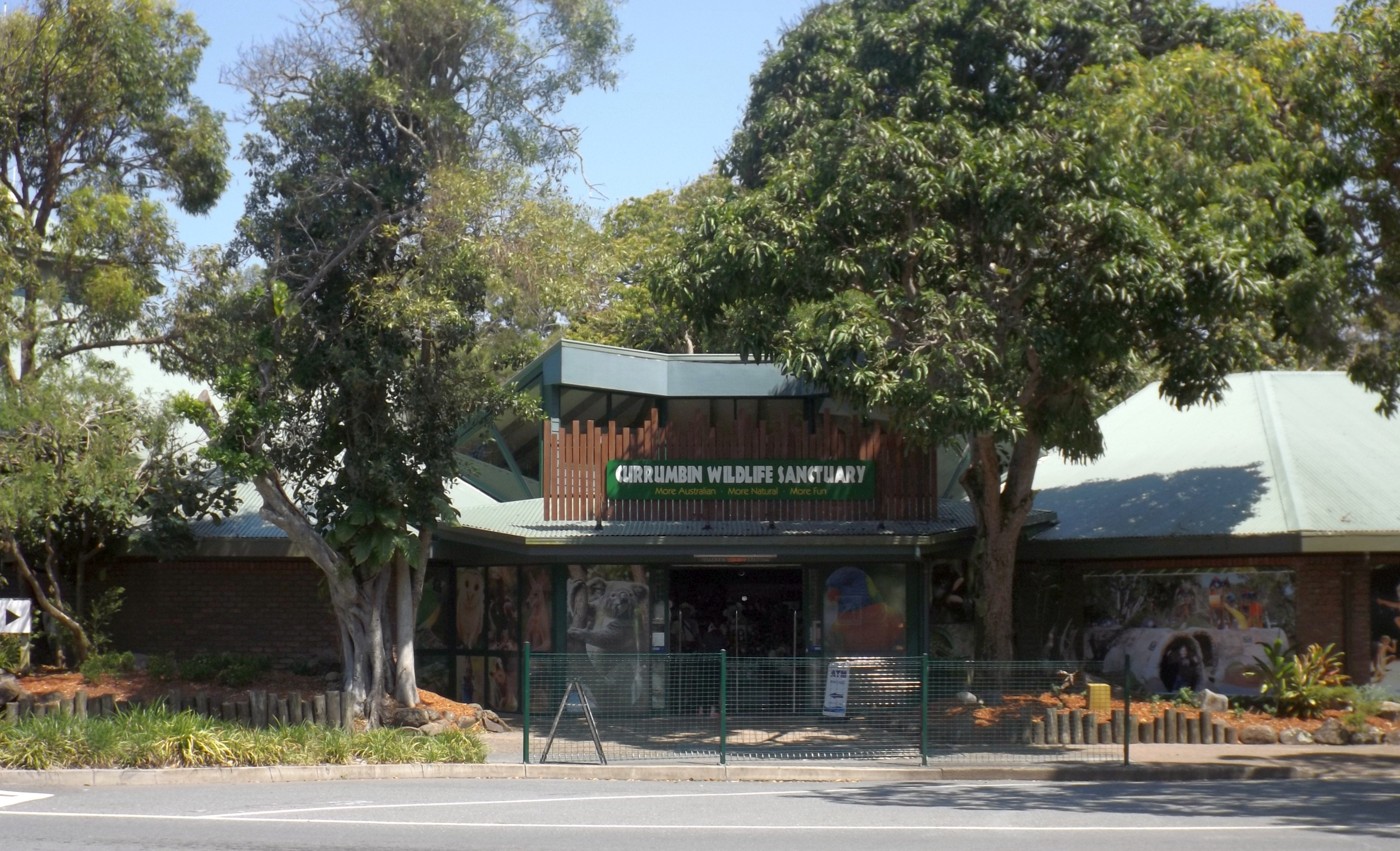
Entrance to the Currumbin Wildlife Sanctuary, 20

=== Main sanctuary ===
The main sanctuary is located less than 300 metres from the coast, south and south-west of the hill at Currumbin Point on the southern shore of Currumbin Creek. Unlike much of the surrounding Gold Coast, the area is free of high-rise development. The sanctuary is bisected by the Gold Coast Highway and Tomewin Street. It comprises four main areas:

- the original sanctuary site (south of Tomewin Street)
- reserve lands along Flat Rock Creek (leased from the Gold Coast City Council),
- a car park and picnic ground (north of Tomewin Street), and
- the Western Reserve (west of the highway).

A tunnel under the highway links the eastern and western sides of the main sanctuary.

==== East of the highway and south of Tomewin Street ====
The eastern side of the sanctuary, south of Tomewin Street and near Flat Rock Creek, contains the site’s main entrance and several structures of heritage significance. These include the Spirit of the Outback Store (originally the Rock Shop, completed 1964–65), the three-storey Kiosk building (1972), parts of the miniature train line, an early fibrous-cement building, and the Rainforest Pool Aviary (pre-1970, refurbished 1987). The lorikeet-feeding arena, a central feature since the 1950s, remains in its original location and general arrangement.

The 1972 Kiosk, expanded in the late 1980s and early 1990s, houses a café, conference rooms, and administration offices. It retains its octagonal layout and opens onto a large deck overlooking the lorikeet-feeding area. Adjacent are the former Rock Shop and annex, also of heritage interest. Other structures added later, such as the Honey House, Forest Fringe Aviary (1990), Green Cauldron enclosure, and Green Guardian Theatre (1990), are not considered to be of cultural heritage significance.

A pedestrian and miniature railway tunnel (constructed c. 1974) links the eastern area to the Western Reserve. Nearby, a residence where founder Alex Griffiths lived between 1971 and 1998 is included within the heritage boundary, though the house itself is not considered significant.

==== East of the highway and north of Tomewin Street ====
Northwest of Tomewin Street, a 1.6-hectare section of sanctuary land contains a car park and a grassed picnic area with mature trees, including hoop pines (Araucaria cunninghamii) and Moreton Bay figs (Ficus macrophylla).

==== Reserves ====
Approximately 5.1 hectares of reserve land along Flat Rock Creek includes lagoons that serve as bird habitats.

A concrete tunnel beneath the Gold Coast Highway links the eastern section of the sanctuary with the Western Reserve. It accommodates the miniature railway and a pedestrian pathway.

==== Western Reserve ====
The Western Reserve, a 18.7-hectare area west of the Gold Coast Highway, forms part of the Currumbin Wildlife Sanctuary and includes key tourist attractions. Only facilities associated with founder Alex Griffiths’ period of management, such as parts of the miniature railway and early landscaping features like bridges and ponds, are considered to be of cultural heritage significance. Later additions, including animal enclosures and recreational structures, are not heritage-listed.

=== Coolamon ===
Coolamon is an 18-hectare property in Currumbin Valley used by Currumbin Wildlife Sanctuary as a release area for rehabilitated wildlife. Formerly a public picnic area, the site includes access roads, fencing, and remnants of visitor facilities. It adjoins Nicoll Scrub National Park and is located near the Queensland–New South Wales border.

== Species kept at the sanctuary ==
Alex Griffith's Aviary

- Brown cuckoo-dove
- Eastern whipbird
- Green catbird
- Little lorikeet
- Mary River Turtle
- Sacred kingfisher
- Turquoise parrot
- Wompoo fruit-dove

Entrance Exhibits

- Cape Barren goose
- Koala
- Red-necked wallaby
- Short-beaked echidna
- Tammar wallaby

Ngagan (Reptile) & Nocturnal Species Den

- Black-headed python
- Boyd's forest dragon
- Broad-headed snake
- Cane toad
- Collett's snake
- Feathertail glider
- Freshwater Australian bass (perch)
- Frilled-neck lizard
- Ghost bat
- Greater bilby
- Green tree python
- Magnificent tree frog
- Northern brown bandicoot
- Queensland lungfish
- Southern greater glider
- Short-beaked echidna
- Spinifex hopping mouse
- Spiny-tailed monitor
- Spotted black snake
- Spotted python
- Squirrel glider
- Stimson's python

Chungurra (Pelican) Country

- Australian pelican
- Pied cormorant

Forest Fringe Aviary

- Bar-shouldered dove
- Brown cuckoo-dove
- Common bronzewing
- Crested pigeon
- Rose-crowned fruit-dove
- Sacred kingfisher
- White-browed woodswallow
- Wompoo fruit-dove

Garima (Conservation) Country

- American alligator
- Black-necked stork
- Eastern long-neck turtle
- Tasmanian devil

Garima (Conservation) Aviaries

- Brown cuckoo-dove
- Brush bronzewing
- Chestnut-breasted mannikin
- Cockatiel
- Double-barred finch
- Double-eyed fig parrot
- Eastern whipbird
- Golden whistler
- Gouldian finch
- Hooded robin
- Little lorikeet
- Luzon bleeding-heart dove
- Musk lorikeet
- Orange-bellied parrot
- Red-browed fig parrot
- Regent honeyeater
- Spinifex pigeon
- Star finch
- Superb fairywren
- Wompoo fruit-dove

Bubura (Bush) Country

- Australian king parrot
- Bar-shouldered dove
- Bush stone-curlew
- Cockatiel
- Crested pigeon
- Dingo
- Eclectus parrot
- Gang-gang cockatoo
- Grey-headed flying fox
- Koala
- Major Mitchell's cockatoo
- Princess parrot
- Red-tailed black cockatoo
- Southern hairy-nosed wombat
- Superb parrot
- Tawny frogmouth

Muni (Kangaroo) Country

- Brush-tailed rock wallaby
- Eastern grey kangaroo
- Emu
- Freshwater crocodile
- Red kangaroo
- Red-legged pademelon
- Red-necked wallaby
- Saltwater crocodile
- Swamp wallaby

Lost Valley

- Binturong
- Black-capped lory
- Blue-and-gold macaw
- Boa constrictor
- Boyd's forest dragon-
- Brown cuckoo-dove
- Buff-banded rail
- Bush stone-curlew
- Chattering lory
- Corn snake
- Cotton-top tamarin
- Eclectus parrot
- Glossy ibis
- Golden pheasant
- Goodfellow's tree-kangaroo
- Greater capybara
- Green iguana
- Lumholtz's tree-kangaroo
- Luzon bleeding-heart dove
- Mandarin duck
- Moluccan lory
- Nicobar pigeon
- Pacific emerald dove
- Red panda
- Ring-tailed lemur
- Satin bowerbird
- Sun conure
- Torresian imperial pigeon
- Veiled chameleon
- White-bibbed ground dove
- White-headed pigeon
- Wonga pigeon

Scales & Tails Show

- Central bearded dragon
- Darwin carpet python
- Dingo
- Shingleback lizard
- Stimson's python
- Tasmanian brushtail possum

Land of the Parrots Aviary

- Apostlebird
- Buff-banded rail
- Princess parrot
- Superb parrot

Wild Skies Show

- Australian king parrot
- Australian pelican
- Barking owl
- Black kite
- Blue-and-gold macaw
- Bush stone-curlew
- Crested tern
- Galah
- Green-winged macaw
- Major Mitchell's cockatoo
- Masked owl
- Red-tailed black cockatoo
- Yellow-tailed black cockatoo
- Wedge-tailed eagle

Tortoise Village

- Radiated tortoise

Outback Springs

- Central bearded dragon
- Crowned stick insect
- Cunningham’s skink
- Peppermint stick insect
- Shingleback

Other Species

- Kroombit tinker frog
- Rainbow lorikeet (wild roaming)

== Frog-breeding ==
In 2008, a dedicated frog-breeding facility was established, specifically to try to breed the critically endangered Kroombit tinker frog. As of November 2020, it was estimated fewer than 200 remained of these frogs remained the wild, in areas of tropical rainforest at Kroombit Tops National Park, approximately 70 kilometres (43 mi) south-west of Gladstone. The major threat to its existence, apart from climate change, less habitat and certain pests, is chytrid fungus.

In 2020, scientists at the facility bred the Kroombit tinker frog in captivity for the first time ever, raising hopes of preventing extinction. They had been trying since around 2000, but it was only when the Currumbin offered the facility that the work could properly begin. They eventually managed to bring about a spawning by their captive frogs, and the first tadpole metamorphosed into a frog in November 2020.

== Heritage listing ==
Currumbin Wildlife Sanctuary was listed on the Queensland Heritage Register on 18 September 2009.

== Awards ==
In 2009 as part of the Q150 celebrations, the Currumbin Wildlife Sanctuary was announced as one of the Q150 Icons of Queensland for its role as a "location".
