= Cameron Newham =

Ecclesiastical photographer and programmer

Cameron Newham FSA
- Born: 12 August 1965 (age 60); South Yarra, Melbourne, Victoria, Australia
- Other name: C. B. Newham
- Education: Camberwell Grammar School, Scotch College, Perth
- Alma mater: University of Western Australia (BSc, 1987)
- Occupations: Ecclesiastical photographer, programmer
- Known for: Documenting England's rural parish churches
- Website: parishchurches.org

Cameron Newham FSA (born 1965) is an Australian-born British photographer, author, and independent heritage documentarian. He is best known for his ongoing effort to photograph every rural parish church in England, a project that has spanned more than two decades and produced over 500,000 images from more than 9,000 churches.

== Biography ==
Born in South Yarra, Melbourne, on 12 August 1965, Newham was educated at Camberwell Grammar School and Scotch College, Perth, before completing a BSc in information technology and geography at the University of Western Australia in 1987. He began his career as a software engineer with Australian Defence Industries in 1989 and, during that period, co-authored Learning the Bash Shell for O’Reilly Media.

Newham relocated to the United Kingdom in 1996 from Perth, Western Australia and has since held a range of information-technology posts, including positions at Nomura Research Institute, Macromedia and the British Library, while pursuing large-scale photographic fieldwork.

Newham began photographing rural parish churches in 1997, and was initially inspired by the architectural guides of Nikolaus Pevsner, later drawing on the early-20th-century books of John Stabb after encountering them during a 2007 project on Devon churches. His project gradually expanded to include the detailed documentation of church architecture, sculpture and interior features such as pre-1900 monuments, fonts and wall paintings. By the mid-2020s, Newham had photographed more than 9,000 churches and compiled an archive exceeding 500,000 images. His work has been used by scholars in the fields of medieval architecture, sculpture and funerary art. Newham's photographs of knightly effigies were featured in Tobias Capwell’s monograph Armour of the English Knight 1400–1450, and were praised for offering overhead views that emulate a devotional perspective. Newham has also contributed to the Post-Reformation Wall Painting Project (PRWP), a scholarly initiative cataloguing later church murals in England.

Newham’s 728-page book entitled Country Church Monuments, published in 2022, received notice across both popular and academic press; reviewers in the Literary Review, The Times, The Daily Telegraph and The Antiquaries Journal highlighted its authoritative commentary, comprehensive scope and high quality photography of 365 rural monuments.

== Selected works ==
- Newham, Cameron; Rosenblatt, Bill (March 2005). Learning the bash Shell (3rd ed.). O'Reilly Media, Inc. ISBN 9780596009656.
- Newham, C. B. (2009). Some Old Devon Churches: A Tribute to John Stabb. DAE Publishing. ISBN 9781906265014.
- Newham, C. B. (6 October 2022). Country Church Monuments. Particular Books. ISBN 9780241488331.
