= Brian Elliott (writer) =

Australian writer and academic (1910–1991)

Brian Robinson Elliott AM FAHA (11 April 1910 – 29 August 1991) was a writer and academic in Adelaide, South Australia, hailed as the first academic to regard Australian literature as a worthy field of study.

== Career ==
Elliott was born in Adelaide, the younger son of Arthur J. Elliott of Parkside, South Australia. He was educated at Victor Harbor and matriculated at Unley High School. He received his BA in English and French at the University of Adelaide in 1931. He was involved in amateur theatre as producer, with the Players' Guild and WEA Little Theatre.

Elliott taught English at two senior high schools over six years, during which time his thesis was accepted for qualification as Master of Arts. He was appointed temporary assistant in English at the University of Western Australia in 1938.

Elliott was appointed lecturer in English at the University of Adelaide in 1941. He was appointed reader in Australian literature in 1961, a post he held until 1975.

He is reputedly the first critic to suspect the Ern Malley papers of being a hoax and was called as an expert witness in the trial.

Mapped but Not Known: The Australian Landscape of the Imagination was compiled by P. Robin Eaden and F. H. "Tim" Mares presented to Elliott on 11 April 1985, marking his 75th birthday, published 1986.

== Honours and recognition ==
Elliott was a Foundation Fellow of the Australian Academy of the Humanities. He was presented with the honorary award, Doctor of the University of Adelaide, following his retirement in 1975. In the 1976 Australia Day Honours he was appointed a Member of the Order of Australia.

== Works ==
- James Hardy Vaux (1944 essay)
- Leviathan's Inch (1946 novel)
- Singing to the Cattle (1947 essay)
- Coast to Coast (ed., 1948)
- Marcus Clarke (1958 biography)
- The Landscape of Australian Poetry (1967 criticism)
- Bards in the Wilderness (ed., 1970)
- Adam Lindsay Gordon (ed., 1973)
- The Jindyworobaks (ed., 1979)
