= Hedley Beare =

Australian academic

Hedley Beare AM (28 November 1932 – 5 September 2010) was an Australian educator, administrator and author. He led the creation of the Northern Territory and ACT education systems. Beare wrote, co-wrote or edited 18 books and contributed 40 book chapters and hundreds of journal articles. He delivered the 1986 Buntine Oration titled "Shared Meanings About Education: The Economic Paradigm Considered."

He was appointed a Member of the Order of Australia in 2009.
