= Charles Barber (Australian Army officer) =

Australian Army officer

Charles Stanley Barber
- Born: 6 July 1888; Melbourne, Victoria
- Died: 4 October 1965 (aged 77); Melbourne, Victoria
- Military career
- Allegiance: Australia
- Branch: Australian Army
- Service years: 1910–1943
- Rank: Brigadier
- Commands: 4th Infantry Brigade (1940–43); 29th Battalion (1939–40); 29th/22nd Battalion (1938–39); 59th Battalion (1935–38); 2nd Artillery Survey Company (1926–35)
- Conflicts: First World War; Gallipoli Campaign; Battle of Lone Pine; Second World War; New Guinea Campaign
- Awards: Military Cross; Colonial Auxiliary Forces Officers' Decoration

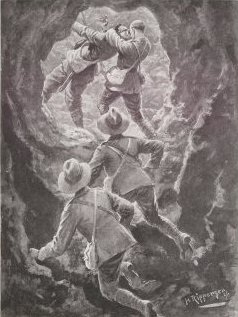
Captain Barber surprising a Turkish sentry in a hostile listening tunnel, 1916.

Brigadier Charles Stanley Barber, MC, VD (6 July 1888 – 4 October 1965) was an Australian Army officer. He served in the Australian Imperial Force during the First World War, rising to the rank of captain and being awarded the Military Cross. He served in the Citizens Military Force between the wars, and in the Second World War rose to the rank of brigadier.

== Early life and career ==
Barber was born in Kew, Melbourne, the son of Charles Deynes Barber and Margaret Anne (Maggie) McLean. He attended Camberwell Grammar School and Scotch College, and completed a Bachelor of Mining Engineering at the University of Melbourne. While at University, he joined the Melbourne University Rifles in 1910 and was commissioned a second lieutenant in 1913.

== First World War ==
On the outbreak of the First World War, Barber was working in Broken Hill as a mining engineer when he joined the Australian Imperial Force (AIF) on 29 August 1914 for active service overseas. He was appointed a second lieutenant in the 3rd Field Company Engineers. On 22 September 1914 he embarked from Melbourne for Alexandria with the 3rd Field Company. Promoted lieutenant on 1 February 1915, Barber trained in Mesopotamia, where his company built and maintained a pontoon bridge over the Suez Canal, until embarking for Gallipoli from Alexandria on 5 April 1915.

Barber arrived at Anzac Cove about 10:30 a.m. on 25 April 1915, about five hours after the first troops landed to attack Turkish positions. On 27 July he transferred to 4th Field Company Engineers and was promoted to captain. By 12 September 1915 he was leading the 4th Field company at Lone Pine. On 19 October he was conducting tunnelling operations.

During the evening of the 6th November 1915, an opening was driven into a Turkish listening tunnel in front of LONE PINE. The work of reconnoitering was at once taken in hand by Captain Barber and his party under difficult and extremely hazardous conditions. Over 70 feet of the enemy's heavily timbered main gallery was occupied, barricaded and surveyed within an hour of the first entry being made. The party had to enter the enemy work one by one through an untimbered hole barely large enough to crawl through. Their prompt action gained for us additional and most valuable protection for the LONE PINE front.

— Army Dispatch Record,

On 29 January 1916 Barber was awarded the Military Cross.

On 31 January 1916 he transferred to hospital with enteric fever, and then developed a related thrombosis in his leg and spent some time in Alexandria, where he was joined by his mother and his sister who helped with his nursing. He returned to Australian aboard HT Nestor on 13 March, and was discharged from the AIF on 30 July.

== Interbellum ==
Barber joined his brother-in-law, Rene Vanderkelen, in a Melbourne Jewel Import Business where his mining qualification assisted in gem valuations. He married Mary Winifred Ware Hickling Forbes on 6 July 1926 at Scots' Church, Melbourne. They lived in Armadale, Melbourne, and had two children: David Deynes Barber (5 November 1928) and Jane Forbes Barber (22 May 1930).

Between the wars Barber worked to keep the militia active, and in 1920 was promoted to captain. In 1926 he was appointed to command the 2nd Artillery Survey Company. In 1928 he was promoted to major. In 1935 he was promoted to lieutenant colonel and transferred to command the 59th Battalion. In August 1939 he was appointed to the command of the 29th Battalion, and was in charge of planning the defence of the Mornington Peninsula, Victoria. His son remembered Saturday car trips around the peninsula when crossroads were studied with a view to gun emplacements and tank traps.

== Second World War ==
At the outbreak of the Second World War, Barber was involved with the training of the 4th Infantry Brigade stationed in Bonegilla, Victoria. On 24 June 1940 he was promoted to colonel in command of the 4th Infantry Brigade. On 5 July 1941 he was promoted to brigadier. In November 1941 he commenced full-time duty with 4th Infantry Brigade at Bonegilla. In March 1942 he moved the 4th Infantry Brigade to Warwick, Queensland and, in May, to Brisbane where he was joined by his wife.

In October 1942 Barber volunteered for service with the Second Australian Imperial Force (a legal requirement before service overseas), and in February 1943 he was transferred to 4th Brigade headquarters in Port Moresby, New Guinea while the Brigade was sent to Milne Bay. In July 1943 he was transferred to the headquarters of the 3rd Division.

On 19 August 1943, for medical reasons, Barber relinquished command of the 4th Brigade and returned to Melbourne, seconded to the Citizens Military Force. In September 1943 he left service with the honorary rank of brigadier.

== Post-war ==
Barber lived at 60 Close St, South Yarra, Melbourne until about 1960, then moved to Terrara Rd, Mitcham, Melbourne. Barber died from a heart attack while driving on 4 October 1965, and was cremated.
