= Camberwell Grammar School =

Anglican boy school in Melbourne, Australia

Location
- 55 Mont Albert Road; Canterbury, Victoria 3126; Australia; 37°48′55″S 145°4′2″E

Information
- Type: Independent, single sex, Anglican primary and secondary day school
- Motto: Latin: Spectemur Agendo (By our deeds may we be known)
- Denomination: Anglican
- Established: 1886; 140 years ago
- Founder: A. B. Taylor
- Principal: Ben Jeacocke
- Chaplain: Rev Alison Andrew
- Gender: Boys
- Enrolment: 1,346 (P–12)
- Houses: Bridgland, Clifford, Derham, Macneil, Robinson, Schofield, Steven, Summons
- Colours: Gold, navy blue & pale blue
- Publication: Spectemur, Grammarian, Echo
- Affiliation: Associated Grammar Schools of Victoria
- Alumni: Old Camberwell Grammarians
- Website: cgs.vic.edu.au

Camberwell Grammar School is an independent, single sex, Anglican primary and secondary day school for boys, located in Canterbury, an eastern suburb of Melbourne, Victoria, Australia.

Camberwell Church of England Grammar School was founded on Prospect Hill in 1886. In July 1891 it was re-opened by William A. Gosman and Alfred S. Hall, as co-principals. In its early years, the school was housed at a number of sites in and around the suburb of Camberwell, Victoria. It occupied the site on Mont Albert Road on Canterbury's Golden Mile from 1935.

As of the 2026 school year, The school has 1,346 students. The school is divided into three sections; Junior School (pre Prep – Year 5), Middle School (Year 6 – Year 8) and Senior School (Year 9 – Year 12).

== Headmasters and principals ==
There have been a total of ten headmasters at Camberwell Grammar School since the school was established in 1886. The current headmaster or now, principal of Camberwell Grammar is Ben Jeacocke (since January 2025).

Years served	Name
1886–1891	A. B. Taylor
1891–1897	W. A Gosman; A. S. Hall
1898–1926	A. S. Hall
1927–1931	M. A. Buntine
1931–1949	H. L. Tonkin
1950–1954	M. Searle
1955–1965	T. H. Timpson
1966–1987	A. D. P. Dyer
1987–2004	C. F. Black
2005–2024	P. G. Hicks
2025–present	B. Jeacocke

== Curriculum ==
Camberwell Grammar offers the Victorian Certificate of Education (VCE) to all of their Year 11 and 12 students, as well as allowing some students to partake in some VCE and VET 1 & 2 units in Year 10 as part of advanced programs.

Camberwell Grammar VCE results (2012-2024)
Year	Rank	Median study score	Scores of 40+ (%)	Cohort size
2012	32	35	23.1	288
2013	32	35	24.9	319
2014	28	35	24.6	299
2015	48	34	17.9	303
2016	26	35	24	310
2017	30	35	24.5	297
2018	26	35	23.4	301
2019	26	35	25.9	304
2020	42	34	21.4	305
2021	55	33	17.1	318
2022	37	34	21.3	324
2023	29	35	21	311
2024	38	34	21.3	331
2025	44	34	20.3	322

== Extra-curricular activities ==
- Australian Army Cadets: The Camberwell Grammar School Army Cadet Unit (CGSACU) was established in 1888 and celebrated its 130th anniversary in 2018.
- DAV Interschool Debating
- Rotary Interact Club
- Towards2050, school sustainability group
- STEM Racing (Formerly F1 In Schools)
- Chess Club
- VEX IQ Robotics Club

=== Music ===
Alongside having a large variety of stringed, brass and combined ensembles for various different proficiencies and age groups, Camberwell Grammar also has the Music Academy program, which replicates various elements of the Music Conservatorium model in order to support musicians throughout their musical journey during and after school. The school holds a biannual concert at Hamer Hall including several ensembles from the Junior, Middle and Senior Schools.

=== Sport ===
Camberwell Grammar is one of the original member schools of the Associated Grammar Schools of Victoria (AGSV), and won the organisation's inaugural Athletics competition in November of 1920.

All students enrolled at Camberwell Grammar School participate in physical education classes, which are scheduled weekly. The school also offers students the opportunity to participate in the Sports Academy, in which students with athletic talent are coached in small groups or individually to improve in their skills in their discipline outside of regular sporting activity times.

The school's sporting program requires all students enrolled in grades 7-12 to participate in organised sports, in addition to physical education classes. The sports offered for students to participate in are grouped into summer, winter and spring categories, as fits the AGSV schedule. However, sports which are not organised by the AGSV run on separate timetables. This sees students participating in these activities year-round, whilst being required to be involved in at least two. However, the Spring sports offered are not compulsory like those in summer and winter.

==== AGSV premierships ====
Camberwell Grammar has won the following AGSV premierships.

- Athletics (11) – 1920, 1971, 1973, 1974, 1975, 1976, 1977, 1978, 1979, 1980, 2022, 2023
- Badminton (22) – 1996, 1998, 1999, 2000, 2003, 2004, 2005, 2006, 2007, 2008, 2010, 2011, 2012, 2014, 2015, 2016, 2017, 2018, 2019, 2021, 2022, 2023, 2024
- Basketball (2) 2023,2024
- Cricket (11) – 1921, 1943, 1944, 1945, 1961, 1977, 1982, 1993, 1994, 2002, 2023
- Football – 1933
- Hockey (21) – 1991, 1993, 1994, 1995, 1996, 1997, 1999, 2000, 2001, 2002, 2003, 2004, 2005, 2006, 2010, 2011, 2012, 2013, 2014, 2018, 2021
- Squash (2) – 2007, 2023
- Swimming (5) – 1944, 1961, 2021, 2022, 2023
- Table tennis (21) – 1995, 1996, 1997, 1998, 1999, 2000, 2002, 2005, 2009, 2010, 2011, 2012, 2013, 2015, 2016, 2017, 2018, 2019, 2020, 2022, 2023.2024
- Tennis (14) – 1925, 1926, 1930, 1939, 1940, 1942, 1975, 1978, 1986, 1988, 1994, 2021, 2022, 2023
- Volleyball – 1991
- Water Polo – 2022

== Some Old Camberwell Grammarians ==
- Wayne Arthurs (1988 leaver, represented Australia in the 2004 Olympics tennis team)
- Clive Baillieu, 1st Baron Ballieu KBE, CMG (1889–1967), Australian-British rower, businessman and public servant (1907 leaver)
- Charles Barber (1908 leaver, Military Cross for service in WWI)
- David Bridie (1980 leaver, seven time ARIA award-winning songwriter and composer)
- Darren Chau (writer, performer, producer, television executive).
- Simon Chesterman (1990 leaver, dean of law at the National University of Singapore)
- Josh Daicos (2016 leaver, Australian Rules footballer)
- David de Kretser (1956 leaver, born 1939, former Governor of Victoria)
- Keith Dodgshun (1912 leaver, Honourable, Deputy Premier of Victoria 1950–1952)
- Rob Gell (1970 leaver, born 1952, geomorphologist and television weather man)
- Sam Gibson (2004 leaver, born 1986, Australian Rules footballer)
- Ashley Gilbertson (1995 leaver, photo journalist)
- Kym Gyngell (1970 leaver, born 1952, actor and comedian)
- Greg Ham (1971 leaver, 1953–2012, musician in the band Men at Work and actor)
- Cameron Hepburn (1993 leaver, professor of economics)
- Dan Houston (2015 leaver, Australian Rules footballer)
- Paul Hudson (1988 leaver, Australian Rules footballer for Hawthorn Football Club)
- Barry Humphries (1951 leaver, born 1934, also educated at Melbourne Grammar School, known for the characters Dame Edna Everage and Sir Les Patterson)
- Adrian Jackson (2001 leaver), not to be confused with the 1971 leaver and former Army officer of the same name
- Andy Lee (1999 leaver, born 1981, television and radio personality, captain of music and sport 1999)
- Jonathan Little (1983 leaver, musician)
- Robert A. Little (1914 leaver, 1895–1918, World War I flying ace)
- Randolph Lycett (1904 leaver, champion tennis player)
- Cameron Macaulay (1974 leaver, Honourable Justice)
- Andrew McFarlane (1969 leaver, born 1951, actor)
- Russell Morris (1979 leaver, Australian Rules Hawthorn player)
- Sir Keith Murdoch (1901 leaver, 1886–1952, journalist, father of Rupert Murdoch).
- Sir Walter Logie Forbes Murdoch (1891 leaver, 1874–1970, academic, former chancellor of the University of Western Australia, great uncle of Rupert Murdoch)
- Cameron Newham FSA, ecclesiastical photographer and programmer (1977 leaver)
- George Reid (1922 leaver, Honourable Sir)
- Tim Schenken (about 1961 leaver)
- Brendan Schwab (about 1985 leaver, Founded World Players Association, Sports Administrator)
- Ken Slater (1941 leaver, 1924–1963, Australian Rules footballer and tennis player)
- Henry Douglas Stephens (1895 leaver, 1877–1952, pediatric surgeon)
- Greg Strachan (1975 leaver, born 1958, Australian Rules footballer).
- Kimon Taliadoros (1985 leaver, born 1968, Footballer (Soccer) represented South Melbourne Hellas and Australia, Current Technical Director at Bentleigh Greens FC)
- Lindsay Urwin (1972 leaver, born 1956, bishop and leading member of the Anglican Church)
- George Alan Vasey (1895–1945, major general), also attended Wesley College, Melbourne
- Tony Wilson (1990 leaver, author and broadcaster)

== See also ==
- List of schools in Victoria
- List of high schools in Melbourne
- List of Anglican schools in Australia
