= Arnold Buntine =

Australian rules footballer

Personal information
- Full name: Martyn Arnold Buntine
- Born: 27 December 1898; Caulfield, Victoria
- Died: 26 February 1975 (aged 76); Kilsyth, Victoria
- Original team: Caulfield / University

Playing career^{1}
Years	Club	Games (Goals)
1918	St Kilda	4 (0)
- ^{1} Playing statistics correct to the end of 1918.

Martyn Arnold Buntine (27 December 1898 – 26 February 1975) was an Australian headmaster and Australian rules footballer who played for the St Kilda Football Club in the Victorian Football League (VFL).

After retiring from football he attended Trinity College while at Melbourne University, before obtaining a PhD in Education from the University of Edinburgh. Returning to Melbourne he started teaching at Scotch College, Melbourne before becoming the headmaster of Camberwell Grammar School. In 1931 he moved to Western Australia to be the headmaster of Hale School. During World War II he served in the 2/28th Battalion as a captain, serving in Tobruk and Syria. Promoted to major and then lieutenant-colonel he was put in charge of the 2/11th Battalion. In 1944 he returned to Hale School, before being appointed headmaster of Geelong College in 1945.

Buntine was the son of educationalist Walter Murray Buntine (1866–1953) of Caulfield Grammar School, for whom the Buntine Oration is named. He was married to Gladys (Jim) Buntine, who was the Australian Chief Commissioner of Girl Guides from 1962 until 1968. Their son was educationalist Robert Buntine of The King's School and Newington College.
