= Cameron Macaulay =

Australian Lawyer

Cameron Macaulay is a judge of appeal of (as of 1 February 2022) the Supreme Court of Victoria. He went to Camberwell Grammar School, became a practicing lawyer in 1980, and is a graduate of the law school at Monash University.
