= Jim Buntine =

Australian chief commissioner of Girl Guides

Jim Buntine OBE
- Born: 7 September 1901; Fitzroy, Victoria
- Died: 15 July 1992 (aged 90); Kilsyth, Victoria
- Education: Merton Hall
- Occupation: Australian Chief Commissioner of Girl Guides
- Spouse: Arnold Buntine (1898–1975)
- Children: John Buntine; Robert Buntine (1929–2014)

Gladys Selby "Jim" Buntine (née Spurling; 7 September 1901 – 15 July 1992) was the Australian Chief Commissioner of Girl Guides from 1962 until 1968.

== Biography ==
Spurling was born at Fitzroy, Victoria. She attended Merton Hall from 1913 until 1917 and then a finishing school at Vallois, France. Spurling married Dr (Martyn) Arnold Buntine (1898–1975) on 17 May 1926. The couple were known as Arnold and Jim and they had two sons. Her husband was a schoolmaster who became a headmaster and as he rose professionally she became an "ideal Headmaster’s wife". From the early 1930s, Jim Buntine became involved in the Girl Guides movement in Western Australia. After moving back to the eastern states, she became a member of the Victorian State Council and in Sydney from 1962 until 1968 she was chief commissioner for Australia. Buntine attended world guiding events in Denmark, Britain, Malaya, Japan, and India and, in 1967, she escorted the world chief guide on an Australian tour. Almost two decades after her husband's death Buntine died at Kilsyth Retirement Village, Kilsyth, Victoria.

== Honours ==
- Member of the Order of the British Empire (1960) in recognition of service to the welfare of youth
- Officer of the Order of the British Empire (1966) in recognition of service as Chief Commissioner of the Girl Guides Association
- Silver Fish Award (1966) awarded for outstanding service to Girl guiding combined with service to world Guiding
