= Alex Griffiths (environmentalist) =

Australian beekeeper and environmentalist

Alexander Morris Griffiths AM (5 October 1911 – 29 July 1998) was an Australian beekeeper, floriculturist and conservationist.

== Early life ==
Griffiths was born in New Zealand and arrived in Currumbin, Queensland in about 1944 where he lived with his parents on two and a half acres in Tomewin Street.

== Currumbin Wildlife Sanctuary ==
Griffiths founded the 26 hectare Currumbin Wildlife Sanctuary on his family property at Currumbin, Queensland in 1947 after he started feeding the local wild lorikeets to distract them from damaging his flowers, an initiative that grew into a major tourist attraction.

Each day, at 4.30pm crowds of people would visit to hold the plates of bread and honey for the birds to gather around. While the spectacle of the birds feeding had featured in a number of magazines, the October 1956 edition of The National Geographic Magazine included an article entitled "The Honey Eaters Currumbin". International awareness of the Sanctuary followed and visitor numbers increased.

Originally called the Currumbin Bird Sanctuary in 1976, Griffiths donated the property to the people of Queensland, to be managed by the National Trust of Queensland.

It holds one of the largest collections of Australian wildlife in the world and has cared for injured wildlife since approximately 1949. In 2009 it was added to the Queensland State Heritage Register.

== Conservation work ==
In addition to his work with native animals, Griffiths was active in trying to protect the natural habitat and local environment. He lobbied to stop sand mining on land adjoining the sanctuary, raised concerns regarding the impact of gravel mining on waterways and was involved in efforts to place restrictions on the trapping of native wildlife and birds.

== Awards ==
Griffths was honoured for his work with numerous awards including being appointed a Member of the Order of Australia, for services to conservation, in the 1976 Australia Day Honours.

== Currumbin Valley Reserve ==
In 1996 Griffiths bought the 4-hectare (10-acre) rainforested property that is now the Currumbin Valley Reserve and donated it to the Wildlife Preservation Society of Queensland. In his will he expressed a wish for Bush Heritage Australia (BHA) to take over ownership and care of the land, and the transfer to BHA took place in 1999.

== Bibliography ==
- Gibbon, Tracey (30 June 2002), "Currumbin is losing its feathered friends.", Sunday Mail, Brisbane, p. 35
