= Peter Karmel =

Australian economist and education administrator

Peter Karmel AC CBE FASSA FACE
- Born: Peter Henry Karmel; 9 May 1922
- Died: 30 December 2008 (aged 86); Canberra, Australian Capital Territory
- Education: University of Melbourne; University of Cambridge
- Known for: 7th Vice-Chancellor of the Australian National University; Schools in Australia 1973 report which influenced Australian Government funding of state schools.
- Spouse: Lena Karmel
- Children: Pip Karmel, Tom Karmel, and four others
- Awards: Commander of the Order of the British Empire (1967); Companion of the Order of Australia (1976)
- Scientific career
- Fields: Economics
- Workplaces: University of Melbourne; University of Adelaide; Flinders University; Australian National University

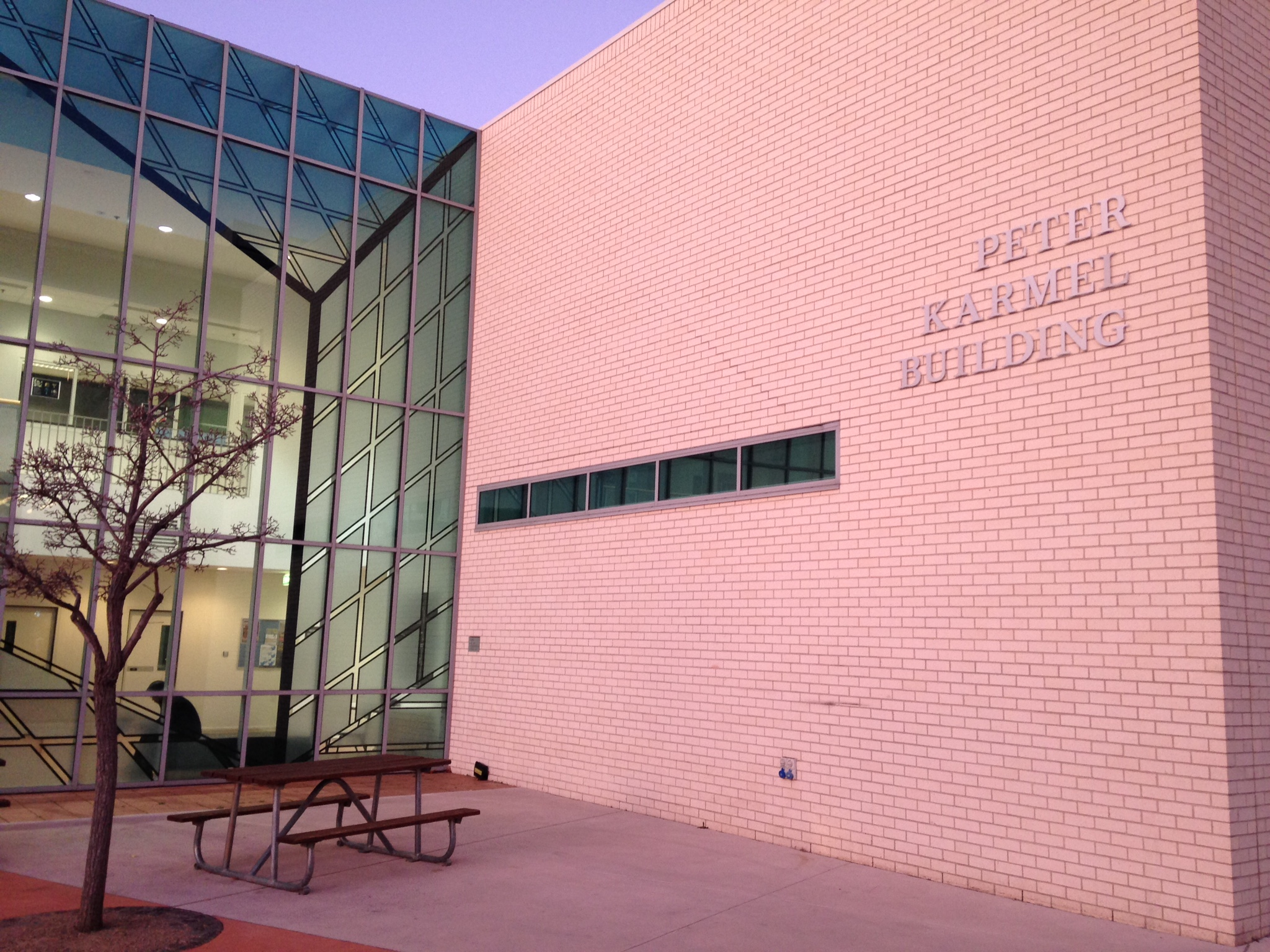
Peter Karmel building, Australian National University

Peter Henry Karmel, AC CBE FASSA FACE (9 May 1922 – 30 December 2008) was an Australian economist and professor. He chaired the Interim Committee for the Australian Schools Commission that produced the report Schools in Australia in 1973.

== Biography ==
Karmel was educated at Caulfield Grammar School and the University of Melbourne, where he won a non-resident Exhibition to Trinity College in 1940. He graduated BA in the School of Economics in 1942, winning the Wyselaskie Scholarship and the Aitcheson Travelling Scholarship. After working at the Commonwealth Bureau of Census and Statistics in Canberra, Karmel accepted a lectureship in Economics and Economic History at the University of Melbourne in 1946. In that year, he was awarded the Rouse Ball studentship at Trinity College, University of Cambridge, where he completed a PhD on Male and Female Fertility Rates. He was awarded a Rockefeller Grant that enabled him to visit America before his return to Melbourne as senior lecturer in 1949.

At the age of 27, Karmel was appointed to the chair of economics at the University of Adelaide in 1950, later moving the Australian National University. He was a member of the board for the Centre for the Mind from 1997 to 1999.

His economic research included a focus on educational issues. In 1962, at the University of Melbourne during the third annual conference of the Australian College of Educators, he delivered the inaugural Buntine Oration, on the topic "Some Economic Aspects of Education". In 1971 he moved back to Canberra to head the Australian Universities Commission, becoming chairman and head of its successor, the Commonwealth Tertiary Education Commission. Professor Karmel released a 1973 report commissioned by the Whitlam government named Schools in Australia which influenced the government's funding of state schools.

Karmel served as the inaugural Vice-Chancellor of Flinders University (1966–1971). He was also Vice-Chancellor of the Australian National University (1982–1987). In 1998 a national conference was held to honour Karmel at the conclusion of his term serving as chair of the Australian Council for Educational Research and board of directors. The Peter Karmel Building at the ANU School of Music was opened on 26 October 2001 and named in his honour.

He died in Canberra on 30 December 2008, aged 86.

== Honours ==
He was made a Commander of the Order of the British Empire in 1967, a Companion of the Order of Australia in 1976, and awarded a Centenary Medal in 2001 "for leadership in Australian higher education and for being a leading academic".

== Personal life ==
He was married to Lena, and they had six children. His daughter Pip Karmel was nominated for the 1996 Academy Award for Film Editing for her work on the film Shine. His son, Tom Karmel, is adjunct professor at Flinders University, where he works at the National Institute of Labour Studies.

== See also ==
- List of Caulfield Grammar School people

Academic offices
Preceded by Donald Anthony Low	7th Vice-Chancellor of the Australian National University; 1982–1987	Succeeded by Lawrence Walter Nichol
