= William Allen (Congregationalist) =

Rev. William Allen (4 November 1847 – 23 June 1919) was an English-born Australian Congregational clergyman.

== History ==
Allen was born in Betchworth, Surrey, and was taken to Victoria by his parents in 1852. He was educated at Scotch and Congregational colleges in Melbourne, and matriculated at the Melbourne University in 1869. He became pastor of the Sandhurst Congregational church in January 1871, was transferred to Maryborough in January 1876, and in January 1880 was appointed to the church at Carlton.

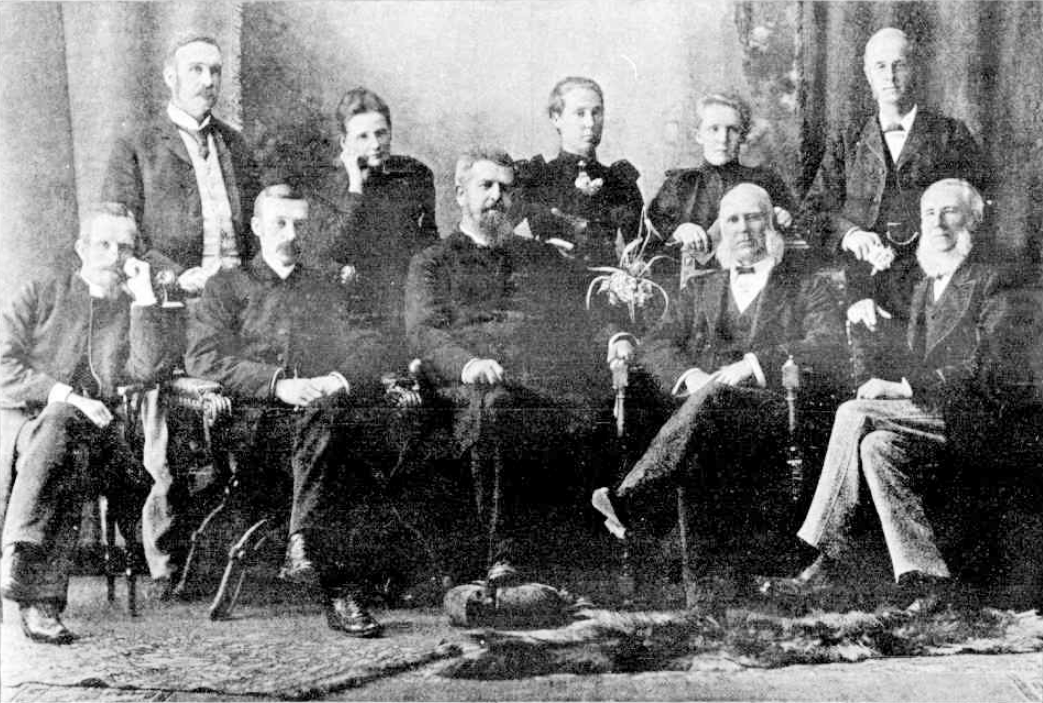
NSW board of China Inland Mission 1893; Allen on far left

In 1890 he left Victoria for Petersham, where he remained for 17 years. In late 1908 or early 1909 he transferred to the Greenwich Congregational church, where he remained until he retired in 1917, but continued preaching until shortly before he died in 1919.

He was Chairman of the Congregational Union and Mission of Victoria in 1885–86 and chairman of the New South Wales Congregational Union in 1894–95.

== Ecumenism ==
Allen was a delegate from the Congregationalist churches to the "Council of the Churches" founded in 1889 by Rev. John Walker, its energetic secretary. In 1895, when Walker resigned, Allen took over the position, but relinquished it in 1896 amid accusations of weakness and sacerdotalism, then in 1899 he was a founder of a rival body, the Evangelical Council, and its first (joint) secretary.

== Literary work ==
From 1871 Allen wrote for the religious press, including the American Congregationalist, and in 1886 published Random Rhymes. He was, for a time, joint-editor of the Independent newspaper. He wrote a national anthem, "God Save Our Austral Land" (to the tune of "God Save the King"?), later sung in Queensland schools. He won first prize of £100 for a cantata which he composed for the opening of the Melbourne Centennial Exhibition in 1888.

== Family ==
Allen married Martha Jane Holdsworth ( – 8 March 1940) on 14 February 1872. Their children included:

- Horace William Allen (1875 – 13 August 1949), was vice-master of Ormond College, Melbourne University
- Harrison Allen, married Mabel Violet Davies, of Greenwich on 23 January 1907. He was known as an elocutionist
- Dr Leslie Holdsworth Allen (1879–1964) married Dora Bavin of Chatswood on 22 December 1915. Known as an academic and poet, professor of English at Duntroon Military College
- Captain Sir Carleton K. Allen M.C. (1887–1966), professor and Warden of Rhodes House, University of Oxford; knighted in 1952
- Elsie May Allen (maybe born 28 December 1872) married Frank Leopold Baker, of Brockley, Kent on 9 May 1895
- Elfrida Allen married Frederick George Phillips, of Greenwich on 4 July 1908

His funeral was held at the Greenwich Congregational Chapel and his remains buried at the Gore Hill Cemetery.
