= David Bevan (judge) =

Australian judge

David John Davies Bevan (11 January 1873 – 2 October 1954) was an English-born Australian judge.

== Life ==
Bevan was born in London in 1873. His parents were Louisa Jane Bevan and Llewelyn David Bevan. They moved to Melbourne in 1886, attending Melbourne Church of England Grammar School and the University of Melbourne, where he was a resident at Trinity College. He enlisted in the University Corps of Officers on 25 September 1896 and was subsequently allotted to the Victorian Garrison Artillery where he was promoted to major in November 1910. In 1914 he was placed on the Unattached List.

He practised as a solicitor from 1901 to 1912, when he moved to Darwin to take up a position as the first judge of the Supreme Court of the Northern Territory. His close association with the Administrator of the Northern Territory, John A. Gilruth, led to a perception of a lack of judicial independence; following the Darwin Rebellion, which led to Gilruth being recalled, a public meeting resolved that Bevan and other judges should leave the territory forthwith. He left on 18 October 1919 and was officially removed from office on 22 September 1920 after a Royal Commission conducted by Tasmanian Justice Norman Ewing. Bevan sued the government but settled out of court.

In later life he retired back to Victoria, settling in Upper Beaconsfield, where he died in 1954.
