= List of acts of the Parliament of Victoria from 1900 =

This is a list of acts of the Parliament of Victoria, Australia for the year 1900.

== 1900 ==
Short title, or popular name	Citation	Royal assent
Long title
Victorian Military Contingent Act 1900	63 Vict. No. 1627	12 January 1900
An Act to provide for the government discipline and maintenance of a Second Victorian Contingent for service with Her Majesty's Regular Forces in South Africa.
	63 Vict. No. 1628	31 January 1900
An Act to apply out of the Consolidated Revenue the sum of Three hundred and seventy-eight thousand one hundred and fifty-seven pounds to the service of the year One thousand eight hundred and ninety-nine and One thousand nine hundred.
Water Supply Loans Application Act 1900	63 Vict. No. 1629	8 February 1900
An Act to sanction the issue and application of certain sums of money for Water Supply in Country Districts.
Municipal Overdrafts (Indemnity) Act 1900	63 Vict. No. 1630	8 February 1900
An Act to indemnify the Councillors of various Municipalities for Borrowing Moneys by Overdrafts on Bankers for the purposes of their Municipalities contrary to the provisions of the Local Government Act 1890. (Note: Local Government Act 1890 (54 Vict. No. 1112))
Railway Loan Application Act 1900	63 Vict. No. 1631	8 February 1900
An Act to authorize the Expenditure of certain sums of Money available under Loan Acts for Railways.
Mining Development Act 1900 (repealed)	63 Vict. No. 1632	8 February 1900
An Act to further amend the Mining Development Act 1896. (Note: Mining Development Act 1896 (60 Vict. No. 1461)) (Repealed by Mining Development Act 1915 (6 Geo. V. No. 2699))
Railway and Public Works Loan Application Act 1900	63 Vict. No. 1633	8 February 1900
An Act to further amend the Railway and Public Works Loan Application Act 1898. (Note: Railway and Public Works Loan Application Act 1898 (62 Vict. No. 1566))
Hamilton Mechanics' Institute Land Act 1900	63 Vict. No. 1634	8 February 1900
An Act to provide for the Sale of certain Lands set apart as a Site for a Mechanics' Institute at Hamilton.
Income Tax Act 1900 (repealed)	63 Vict. No. 1635	8 February 1900
An Act to revive continue and amend the Income Tax Acts and declare the Rates of Income Tax thereunder for the Year ending on the thirty-first day of December One thousand nine hundred. (Repealed by Income Tax Act 1915 (6 Geo. V. No. 2668))
Congregational College Act 1900	63 Vict. No. 1636	8 February 1900
An Act to provide for the creation of a Corporate Body in which property belonging to the Congregational College of Victoria may be vested and for declaring the Trusts on which same is to be held.
Local Government Act 1900 (repealed)	63 Vict. No. 1637	8 February 1900
An Act to further amend the Local Government Act 1890. (Repealed by Local Government Act 1903 (3 Edw. VII. No. 1893))
Preston Loan Act 1900	63 Vict. No. 1638	19 February 1900
An Act to authorize the Shire of Preston to construct certain permanent Works and Undertakings in lieu of certain other permanent Works and Undertakings.
Wando Vale Estate Purchase Act 1900	63 Vict. No. 1639	19 February 1900
An Act to sanction the acquisition by the State of certain land in the County of Dundas known as the Wando Vale Estate.
South African Contingents Contribution Act 1900	63 Vict. No. 1640	19 February 1900
An Act to authorize Contributions by Municipal Councils Banks and other Bodies towards Military Contingents for South Africa or any members thereof or their relatives.
Land Act 1900 (repealed)	63 Vict. No. 1641	19 February 1900
An Act to further amend the Land Acts. (Repealed by Land Act 1901 (1 Edw. VII. No. 1749))
Teachers Act 1900 (repealed)	63 Vict. No. 1642	19 February 1900
An Act relating to State School Teachers. (Repealed by Public Service Act 1915 (6 Geo. V. No. 2713))
Crimes Act 1900 (repealed)	63 Vict. No. 1643	19 February 1900
An Act to amend the Crimes Act 1891. (Note: Crimes Act 1891 (55 Vict. No. 1126)) (Repealed by Police Offences Act 1912 (3 Geo. V. No. 2422))
	63 Vict. No. 1644	19 February 1900
An Act to continue the Vegetation Diseases Act 1896. (Note: Vegetation Diseases Act 1896 (60 Vict. No. 1432)) (Repealed by Vegetation and Vine Diseases Act 1915 (6 Geo. V. No. 2744))
	63 Vict. No. 1645	19 February 1900
An Act relating to certain general rules and orders made under the Companies Act 1896. (Note: Companies Act 1896 (60 Vict. No. 1482))
Licensing Act 1900 (repealed)	63 Vict. No. 1646	19 February 1900
An Act to validate certain Licences and for other purposes. (Repealed by Licensing Act 1915 (6 Geo. V. No. 2683))
Bailiwicks Boundaries Act 1900 (repealed)	63 Vict. No. 1647	19 February 1900
An Act to amend the Supreme Court Act 1890 (Note: Supreme Court Act 1890 (54 Vict. No. 1142)) with regard to the Boundaries of the Eastern and Central Bailiwicks. (Repealed by Supreme Court Act 1915 (6 Geo. V. No. 2733))
Cyanide Patents Purchase Act 1900	63 Vict. No. 1648	19 February 1900
An Act authorizing the State to acquire certain Patent and other Rights relating to the Extraction of Gold and Silver by the Cyanide Process.
Dairying Companies Act 1900	63 Vict. No. 1649	20 February 1900
An Act to further amend the Companies Act 1890. (Note: Companies Act 1890 (54 Vict. No. 1074))
Marine Act 1900 (repealed)	63 Vict. No. 1650	20 February 1900
An Act to further amend the Marine Act 1890. (Note: Marine Act 1890 (54 Vict. No. 1165)) (Repealed by Marine Act 1915 (6 Geo. V. No. 2688))
Water Act 1900	63 Vict. No. 1651	20 February 1900
An Act to amend the Water Act 1890. (Note: Water Act 1890 (54 Vict. No. 1156))
Meat Supervision Act 1900 (repealed)	63 Vict. No. 1652	20 February 1900
An Act for the proper supervision of the Slaughtering of Animals and the Sale of Meat and for other purposes. (Repealed by Meat Supervision Act 1915 (6 Geo. V. No. 2694))
	63 Vict. No. 1653	20 February 1900
An Act to apply a sum out of the Consolidated Revenue to the service of the year ending on the thirtieth day of June One thousand nine hundred and to appropriate the Supplies granted in this Session of Parliament.
Factories and Shops Act 1900 (repealed)	63 Vict. No. 1654	20 February 1900
An Act to further amend the Factories and Shops Acts. (Repealed by Factories and Shops Act 1905 (5 Edw. VII. No. 1975))
Victorian Third Military Contingent Act 1900	63 Vict. No. 1655	20 February 1900
An Act to provide for the government discipline and maintenance of a Third Victorian Contingent for service with Her Majesty's Regular Forces in South Africa.
	64 Vict. No. 1656	26 July 1900
An Act to apply out of the Consolidated Revenue the sum of Six hundred thousand two hundred and fifteen pounds to the service of the year One thousand nine hundred and One thousand nine hundred and one.
Victorian (China) Naval Contingent Act 1900	64 Vict. No. 1657	26 July 1900
An Act to provide for a Victorian Naval Contingent for service with Her Majesty's Royal Navy or Army in China.
Treasury Bonds Act 1900	64 Vict. No. 1658	7 August 1900
An Act to amend the Treasury Bonds Act 1898. (Note: Treasury Bonds Act 1898 (62 Vict. No. 1574))
Railway Loan Act 1900	64 Vict. No. 1659	7 August 1900
An Act to authorize the raising of Money for Railways and for other purposes.
Arms Exportation (China) Act 1900	64 Vict. No. 1660	23 August 1900
An Act for the prohibition of the exportation of Arms Ammunition and certain other Articles to China.
Public and Bank Holidays Act 1900 (repealed)	64 Vict. No. 1661	29 August 1900
An Act relating to the observance of certain Public and Bank Holidays. (Repealed by Public Service Act 1915 (6 Geo. V. No. 2713))
	64 Vict. No. 1662	29 August 1900
An Act to apply out of the Consolidated Revenue the sum of One hundred and seventy-four thousand three hundred and two pounds to the service of the year One thousand eight hundred and ninety-nine and One thousand nine hundred.
	64 Vict. No. 1663	29 August 1900
An Act to apply out of the Consolidated Revenue the sum of Nine hundred and fifty thousand four hundred and fifty-nine pounds to the service of the year One thousand nine hundred and One thousand nine hundred and one.
Newtown and Pitfield Railway Construction Act 1900	64 Vict. No. 1664	26 September 1900
An Act to authorize the construction by the State of a Line of Railway from Newtown to Pitfield.
Walmer Estate Purchase Act 1900	64 Vict. No. 1665	26 September 1900
An Act to sanction the acquisition by the State of certain land in the County of Boning known as the Walmer Estate.
South Africa Military Service Act 1900 (repealed)	64 Vict. No. 1666	8 October 1900
An Act relating to Military Service in South Africa by Members of the Police Force or Public Service and for other purposes. (Repealed by Public Service Act 1915 (6 Geo. V. No. 2713))
Federal House of Representatives Victorian Electorates Act 1900	64 Vict. No. 1667	8 October 1900
An Act for determining the Divisions in Victoria for which Members of the Federal House of Representatives shall be chosen and the Number of Members for each Division.
Saint Kilda Loan Act 1893 Amendment Act 1900	64 Vict. No. 1668	8 October 1900
An Act to amend the Saint Kilda Loan Act 1893. (Note: Saint Kilda Loan Act 1893 (57 Vict. No. 1310))
Census Act 1901 (Note: Although given a short title ending '...Act 1901', this act was passed in the year 1900.)	64 Vict. No. 1669	8 October 1900
An Act for taking a Census for Victoria in the Year One thousand nine hundred and one.
Assembly Electoral Rolls Act 1900 (repealed)	64 Vict. No. 1670	8 October 1900
An Act relating to the Electoral Rolls for the Legislative Assembly. (Repealed by Constitution Act Amendment Act 1915 (6 Geo. V. No. 2632))
Surplus Revenue Act 1900	64 Vict. No. 1671	8 October 1900
An Act relating to the Surplus Revenue of the Financial Year ended on the thirtieth day of June One thousand nine hundred.
Commonwealth Arrangements Act 1900	64 Vict. No. 1672	8 October 1900
An Act to provide for certain matters in Victoria in connexion with the Commonwealth.
Dairying Companies Act 1900 (No. 2)	64 Vict. No. 1673	8 October 1900
An Act to amend the Dairying Companies Act 1900. (Note: Dairying Companies Act 1900 (63 Vict. No. 1649))
Geelong Market Site Act 1900	64 Vict. No. 1674	8 October 1900
An Act to enable the Council of the Town of Geelong to lease Buildings erected on the General Market Site for other than Market purposes.
Municipal Overdrafts (Indemnity) Act 1900 (No. 2)	64 Vict. No. 1675	17 October 1900
An Act to indemnify the Councillors of various Municipalities for Borrowing Moneys by Overdrafts on Bankers for the purposes of their Municipalities contrary to the provisions of the Local Government Act 1890.
City of Melbourne Loan Act 1900	64 Vict. No. 1676	17 October 1900
An Act to enable the Mayor Aldermen Councillors and Citizens of the City of Melbourne to raise a further sum or sums of money not exceeding One hundred and seventy-five thousand pounds.
Weights and Measures Act 1900 (repealed)	64 Vict. No. 1677	17 October 1900
An Act to amend Section twenty-seven of the Weights and Measures Act 1890. (Note: Weights and Measures Act 1890 (54 Vict. No. 1158)) (Repealed by Weights and Measures Act 1915 (6 Geo. V. No. 2748))
Northcote Tramway Extension Act 1900	64 Vict. No. 1678	17 October 1900
An Act to provide for the extension of the Northcote Tramway.
Mildura and Yelta Railway Construction Act 1900	64 Vict. No. 1679	17 October 1900
An Act to authorize the construction by the State of a Line of Railway from Woomelang through Mildura to Yelta.
Geelong Lands Sale Act 1900	64 Vict. No. 1680	17 October 1900
An Act to provide for the Sale of certain Lands in the Town of Geelong and for other purposes.
Prince's Bridge Approach Act 1900 (repealed)	64 Vict. No. 1681	17 October 1900
An Act to provide for the Improvement of the Approach to the City of Melbourne by the Saint Kilda-road at Prince's-bridge. (Repealed by Statute Law Revision Act 1984 (No. 10087))
Bungaree Race-course Railway Construction Act 1900	64 Vict. No. 1682	17 October 1900
An Act to authorize the construction by the State of a Line of Railway from Bungaree Junction to the Race-course Reserve.
Hospitals and Charities Act 1900 (repealed)	64 Vict. No. 1683	17 October 1900
An Act to amend the Hospitals and Charities Act 1890. (Note: Hospitals and Charities Act 1890 (54 Vict. No. 1099)) (Repealed by Hospitals and Charities Act 1915 (6 Geo. V. No. 2666))
Marriage Act 1900 (repealed)	64 Vict. No. 1684	17 October 1900
An Act to further amend the Marriage Act 1890. (Note: Marriage Act 1890 (54 Vict. No. 1166)) (Repealed by Marriage Act 1915 (6 Geo. V. No. 2691))
Whitfield Estate Purchase Act 1900	64 Vict. No. 1685	17 October 1900
An Act to sanction the acquisition by the State of certain land in the County of Delatite known as the Whitfield Estate.
Friendly Societies Act 1900 (repealed)	64 Vict. No. 1686	17 October 1900
An Act to amend the Friendly Societies Act 1890. (Note: Friendly Societies Act 1890 (54 Vict. No. 1094)) (Repealed by Friendly Societies Act 1915 (6 Geo. V. No. 2656))
Saltwater Bridge Act 1900	64 Vict. No. 1687	17 October 1900
An Act relating to the Swamp-road Bridge over the Saltwater River.
Brunswick Lands Purchase Act 1900	64 Vict. No. 1688	17 October 1900
An Act to sanction the acquisition by the State of certain land in the Parish of Jika Jika County of Bourke.
Public Works Loan Application Act 1900	64 Vict. No. 1689	17 October 1900
An Act to authorize certain expenditure out of money available under Loan Acts for Public Works and other purposes.
Railway Loan Application Act 1900 (No. 2)	64 Vict. No. 1690	17 October 1900
An Act to authorize the Expenditure of certain sums of Money available under Loan Acts for Railways.
Moe and Walhalla Railway Construction Act 1900	64 Vict. No. 1691	17 October 1900
An Act to authorize the construction by the State of a Line of Railway from Moe to Walhalla.
Adulteration of Wine Act 1900 (repealed)	64 Vict. No. 1692	17 October 1900
An Act to prevent the Adulteration of Wine. (Repealed by Health Act 1915 (6 Geo. V. No. 2665))
Traction Engine Act 1900 (repealed)	64 Vict. No. 1693	17 October 1900
An Act to regulate the Traffic of Traction Engines. (Repealed by Local Government Act 1903 (3 Edw. VII. No. 1893))
Electric Light and Power Act 1900 (repealed)	64 Vict. No. 1694	17 October 1900
An Act to further amend the Electric Light and Power Act 1896. (Note: Electric Light and Power Act 1896 (60 Vict. No. 1413)) (Repealed by Electric Light and Power Act 1915 (6 Geo. V. No. 2645))
Railway Local Rates Act 1900	64 Vict. No. 1695	17 October 1900
An Act relating to the charging of Local Rates on certain lines of railway.
Supreme Court Act 1900 (repealed)	64 Vict. No. 1696	17 October 1900
An Act to further amend the Supreme Court Act 1890. (Repealed by Supreme Court Act 1915 (6 Geo. V. No. 2733))
Water Supply Loans Application Act 1900 (No. 2)	64 Vict. No. 1697	17 October 1900
An Act to sanction the issue and application of certain sums of money for Water Supply in Country Districts.
Victorian Military Contingents (South Africa) Act 1900	64 Vict. No. 1698	17 October 1900
An Act to make a further appropriation for the Victorian Military Contingents serving with Her Majesty's Regular Forces in South Africa.
Companies Act 1900 (repealed)	64 Vict. No. 1699	17 October 1900
An Act to amend the provisions of the Companies Acts relating to Life Assurance and for other purposes. (Repealed by Companies Act 1915 (6 Geo. V. No. 2631))
	64 Vict. No. 1700	17 October 1900
An Act to apply a sum out of the Consolidated Revenue to the service of the year ending on the thirtieth day of June One thousand nine hundred and one and to appropriate the Supplies granted in this Session of Parliament.
Voting by Post Act 1900	64 Vict. No. 1701	17 October 1900
An Act to provide for Voting by Post at Elections of Members to serve in the Legislative Council and in the Legislative Assembly.
Officers of Customs Act 1900 (repealed)	64 Vict. No. 1702	27 December 1900
An Act relating to the execution of certain duties and powers of the Commissioner and Officers of Customs. (Repealed by Public Service Act 1915 (6 Geo. V. No. 2713))
Inscribed Stock Judgments Act 1900 (repealed)	64 Vict. No. 1703	27 December 1900
An Act lo provide for the Payment of Judgments Decrees and Orders made in the United Kingdom in respect of Victorian Government Stock Inscribed in the United Kingdom. (Repealed by Statute Law (Further Revision) Act 2006 (No. 29 of 2006))
Income Tax Rate Act 1900 (repealed)	64 Vict. No. 1704	27 December 1900
An Act to declare the Rates of Income Tax for the Year ending on the thirty-first day of December One thousand nine hundred and one. (Repealed by Income Tax Act 1915 (6 Geo. V. No. 2668))
Penny Postage Act 1900	64 Vict. No. 1705	27 December 1900
An Act to alter the Rate of Postage on Letters received at any Post Office in Victoria for delivery in Victoria.
Old-age Pensions Act 1900	64 Vict. No. 1706	27 December 1900
An Act to provide for the Payment of Old-age Pensions.
Presbyterian Church of Australia Act 1900	64 Vict. No. 1707	27 December 1900
An Act to enable certain arrangements entered into by and on behalf of the Presbyterian Churches of Victoria New South Wales Queensland South Australia Tasmania and Western Australia for constituting one Presbyterian Church of Australia to be carried into effect and to make provision with regard to the Property held by or on behalf of or in connexion with the Presbyterian Church of Victoria or by any Congregation or Body connected therewith or by any Person for or on behalf of the said Church or any Congregation of the said Church and for other purposes in connexion with such Church.
Yarrowee Channel Loan Repayment Act 1900	64 Vict. No. 1708	27 December 1900
An Act to provide for the Repayment of portion of an Amount to be advanced by the State towards the Yarrowee Channel Works at Ballarat.
Savngs Banks Business Act 1900	64 Vict. No. 1709	27 December 1900
An Act relating to the conduct of the business of the Commissioners of Savings Banks on the transfer of the Post Office to the Commonwealth.
Stamps Act 1900 (repealed)	64 Vict. No. 1710	27 December 1900
An Act relating to Stamps. (Repealed by Stamps Act 1915 (6 Geo. V. No. 2728))
Excise Reduction Act 1900	64 Vict. No. 1711	27 December 1900
An Act to authorize the Governor in Council to reduce the Excise Duties on Tobacco Cigars Cigarettes Spirits and Beer.
Claims for Old-age Pensions Act 1900	64 Vict. No. 1712	27 December 1900
An Act to provide for the Registration of Claims for Old-age Pensions.
Railway Loan Amendment Act 1900	64 Vict. No. 1713	27 December 1900
An Act to amend the Railway Loan Act 1900. (Note: Railway Loan Act 1900 (64 Vict. No. 1659))
Melbourne and Metropolitan Board of Works Act 1900 (repealed)	64 Vict. No. 1714	27 December 1900
An Act to increase the borrowing powers of the Melbourne and Metropolitan Board of Works. (Repealed by Melbourne and Metropolitan Board of Works Act 1915 (6 Geo. V. No. 2696))
Federal Elections Act 1900	64 Vict. No. 1715	27 December 1900
An Act to facilitate the holding of elections of Senators for Victoria of the Senate of the Parliament of the Commonwealth.
Assembly Elections Act 1900	64 Vict. No. 1716	27 December 1900
An Act relating to Elections for the Legislative Assembly during the year One thousand nine hundred and one.
Pacific Cable Authorization Act 1900 (repealed)	64 Vict. No. 1717	27 December 1900
An Act to enable the Government of Victoria to join with certain other Governments in the Cost of the Construction and Maintenance of a Cable across the Pacific Ocean and for purposes consequent upon and incidental to such objects. (Repealed by Statute Law Revision Act 1995 (No. 11 of 1995))
Health Act 1900 (repealed)	64 Vict. No. 1718	27 December 1900
An Act to further amend the Health Act 1890. (Note: Health Act 1890 (54 Vict. No. 1098)) (Repealed by Health Act 1915 (6 Geo. V. No. 2665))
Voting by Post Amendment Act 1900	64 Vict. No. 1719	27 December 1900
An Act to amend the Voting by Post Act 1900. (Note: Voting by Post Act 1900 (64 Vict. No. 1701))
Land Act 1900 (No. 2) (repealed)	64 Vict. No. 1720	27 December 1900
An Act to further amend the Land Acts and for other purposes. (Repealed by Land Act 1901 (1 Edw. VII. No. 1749))
Public Service Act 1900 (repealed)	64 Vict. No. 1721	27 December 1900
An Act providing for the Reclassification of the Public Service and for other purposes. (Repealed by Public Service Act 1915 (6 Geo. V. No. 2713))
Savings Banks Act 1900	64 Vict. No. 1722	27 December 1900
An Act to amend the Savings Banks Acts.

== Sources ==
- "1900 Victorian Historical Acts". AustLII.
