= Llewelyn David Bevan =

Australian minister (1842–1918)

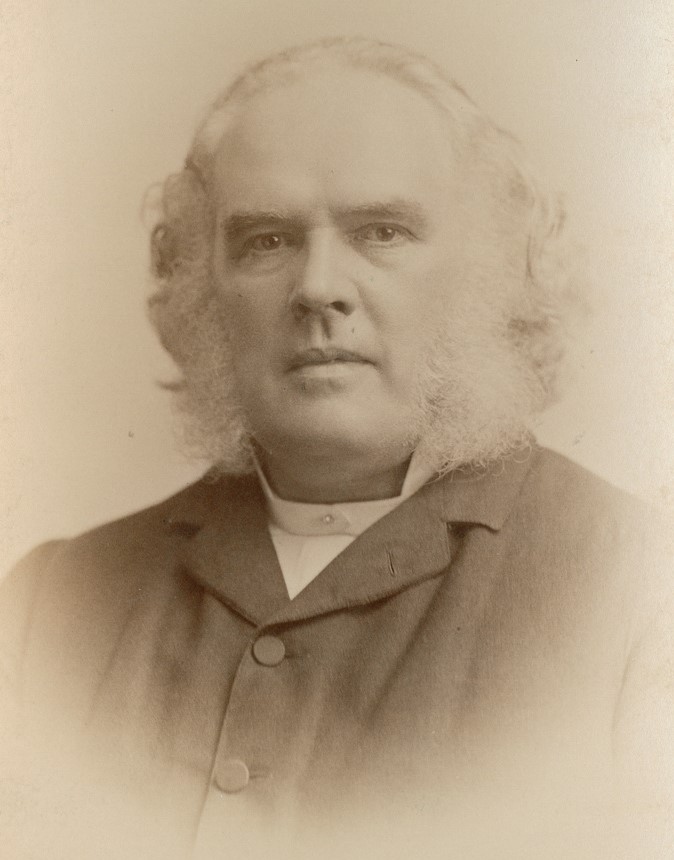

Llewelyn David Bevan (11 September 1842 – 19 July 1918) was a Congregational church minister and academic active in Australia. His wife Louise Jane Bevan was also notable.

== Early life ==
Bevan was born in Llanelly, Carmarthen, Wales. He was the son of the actuary Hopkin Bevan and his wife Eliza (née Davies). Bevan studied at New College, then at the University of London (B.A., 1862 and LL.B. 1865).

Ordained in 1865, Bevan assisted Thomas Binney at King's Weigh House Chapel; then 1869–75 was minister of the major Congregational church Tottenham Court Chapel.

Bevan married Louisa Jane, née Willett in Southampton on 2 April 1870. In 1873 Bevan was elected to the London School Board supporting 'free, compulsory and secular' education. In 1874 Bevan visited the United States of America and ministered at the Central Church, Brooklyn for two months. Bevan subsequently received offers from several churches including the Collins Street Independent Church, Melbourne, Australia, before accepting to minister at the Brick Presbyterian Church (New York City) in 1876. Bevan became moderator of the New York Presbytery in 1880. Awarded a doctorate by Princeton University in 1882, Bevan moved back to London where he was encouraged to run for a seat in parliament. Partly due to health issues, Bevan decided instead to accept a fourth offer to minister at the Collins Street Independent Church.

== Australia ==
Bevan and his family arrived in Melbourne aboard the Valetta on 6 November 1886. Bevan was a supporter of Federation; some urged him to contest the seat of Corangamite but he declined. Bevan was also a collector of books and antique ceramics; and a recognized student of Henrik Ibsen. He was a member of the academic staff of the Victorian Congregational College under Dr W. A. Gosman. In February 1910 Bevan became principal of Parkin College, Adelaide, a position he held until his death.

== Late life ==
Bevan was a sufferer of diabetes and ultimately peripheral vascular disease and died on 19 July 1918, survived by his wife Louisa, three sons and four daughters. His wife was an executive member of the National Council of Women. She published poetry and later published The Life and Reminiscences of Llewelyn David Bevan which added to her husband's memoirs with her own notes. They had seven children and adopted another child. Louisa Jane Bevan died in 1933.
