= Australian International Academy =

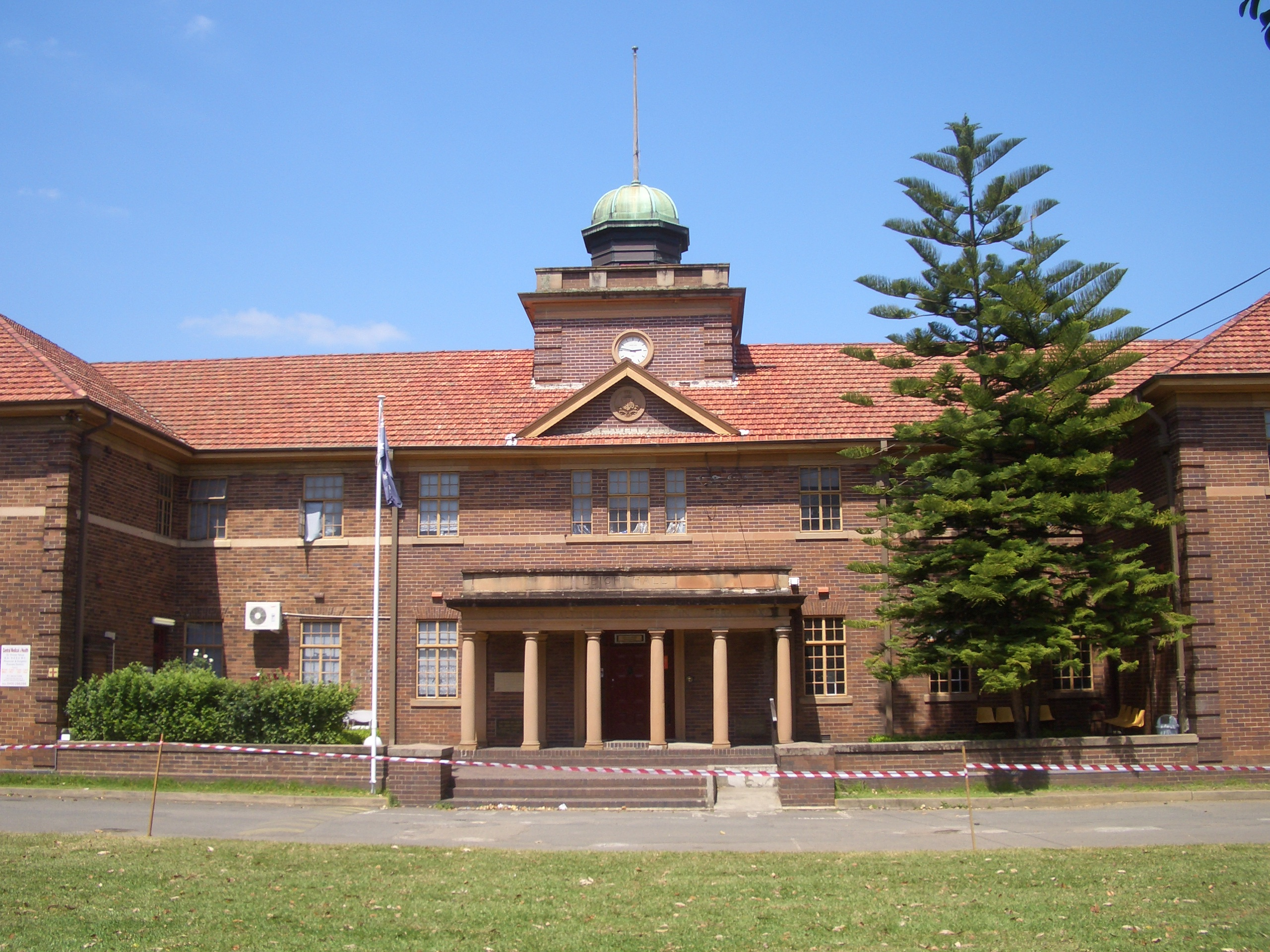
- The Strathfield South Campus of AIA

Location
- Australia; 37°43′35″S 144°57′31″E

Information
- School type: Private, comprehensive, primary school
- Religious affiliation: Islamic
- Established: 1983
- Grades: Primary & secondary
- Website: aia.nsw.edu.au

Australian International Academy is an Islamic school group in various locations in Australia. The school was Australia's first Muslim college and was then known as the King Khalid Islamic College named after Khalid bin Abdulaziz al Saud. Its primary school was set up in 1999 with a grant from Saudi Arabia, that being the only foreign money the school has received.

The school has six campuses that offer the Australian National Curriculum and the International Baccalaureate. The academy sports a Primary Campus (providing grades Prep to Grade 5) in Coburg, and a Secondary Campus (Grade 6 to Year 12) in Merlynston, North Coburg. A new campus, based in Caroline Springs, commenced operation at the beginning of 2014.

Over the past decade, the Academy has expanded into New South Wales by purchasing a school in Strathfield South (Noor Al Houda Islamic College, originally Leigh College) and an additional campus in Kellyville.

The Academy also has a campus in Abu Dhabi, UAE which in 2013 became a fully accredited International Baccalaureate (IB).

The Australian International Academy is also accredited with being the first and only Muslim school to offer all three IB programmes in the southern hemisphere.
