= National Anti-Sweating League =

Historical groups of labor organisations in Australia and the UK

The National Anti-Sweating League is the name adopted by two groups of social reformers in Australia and Britain at the turn of the nineteenth and twentieth centuries. Both campaigned against the poor conditions endured by many workers in so-called sweatshops and called for a minimum wage.

== Australia ==
The National Anti-Sweating League was inaugurated in Melbourne on 29 Jul 1895, with Rev. Alexander Gosman as president, Samuel Mauger as secretary, and Alfred Deakin as treasurer. Vida Goldstein was another member. Their efforts resulted in wage regulation via the Factory Act of 1896.

== Britain ==
The National Anti-Sweating League was an all-party pressure group formed in 1906 with a 3-day conference in the Guildhall, London. 341 delegates representing (via trade unions) some two million workers attended. Notable members included Alfred George Gardiner, R. H. Tawney, Mary Reid Macarthur, and Lady Astor, while its first secretary was George Shann. As a result of the campaign, the Trade Boards Act 1909 was passed, with boards modelled on those in the state of Victoria, Australia, following the 1896 act.

== See also ==
- Anti-sweatshop movement
