= Cyril Bavin =

New Zealand-born Australian Methodist minister and missionary

Major Cyril Bavin OBE
- Born: 1878; Nelson, New Zealand
- Died: 20 February 1956 (aged 77–78); Brighton, England
- Education: Newington College; Wesleyan Theological Institution
- Occupations: Methodist Missionary; Migration advocate
- Spouse: Vera Daphne (née Lovejoy)
- Children: 2 sons & 2 daughters
- Parent(s): Emma (née Buddle) and The Rev. Rainsford Bavin

Cyril Bavin OBE (1878 - 20 February 1956) was a New Zealand-born Australian Methodist minister and missionary to Fiji who became General Secretary to the YMCA Migration Department and Honorary Secretary of the Migration Bureau of the Overseas League based in London. He was an advocate of mass migration from Britain to Canada, Australia and New Zealand both as a way to alleviate poverty in the mother country and as a means of building up the economy of these countries.

== Family and early life ==
Cyril Bavin was born in Nelson, New Zealand, and was one of nine children of the Rev. Rainsford Bavin, a Methodist minister from Lincolnshire, England, and his New Zealand-born wife Emma, née Buddle. His siblings were: Edna (Mrs Charles Lack); Jessie (Mrs Ambrose Fletcher); Sir Thomas Bavin; Gertrude (Mrs William Parker); Horace Bavin; Florence Bavin (Mrs Ernest Warren); Lancelot Bavin; and Dora Bavin (Mrs Leslie Allen). Bavin Snr arrived in New Zealand in 1867 and was appointed to Christchurch. He married in 1867 and was then appointed to Timaru, Kaiapoi and Wanganui. Cyril was born during his parents time in Nelson and then lived in Wellington and Auckland. His family moved to Sydney from Auckland in 1889 and his father took charge of the William St Church. In 1893 he commenced as a student at Newington College.

== Christian mission ==
In 1896 Bavin was invited by the Methodist Episcopal Church in India to join the staff of the mission high school at Poona prior to entering the ministry. After returning from India he became a student at the Wesleyan Theological Institution which was then based in the grounds of Newington College. After his ordination in 1903 Bavin undertook mission work in Fiji. In 1914, Bavin contributed a chapter, The Indian in Fiji, to the book, A century in the Pacific, edited by James Colwell with an introduction by William Henry Fitchett.

== YMCA ==
Bavin became a military secretary to the YMCA during World War I and was made an honorary major. He represented the YMCA on the Children's Overseas Reception Board.

== Migration advocate ==
He later became an advocate of British migration to the Dominions. In the 1920s, Bavin proposed child migration schemes for British children to be sent to Australia and New Zealand. He advocated the broadening of the basis of individual nomination of a prospective migrant to its extension from individuals to Church congregations, service clubs, friendly societies and lodges. Bavin was awarded the OBE in the 1928 Birthday Honours.

== Marriage ==
He married Vera Daphne Lovejoy in Mudgee, New South Wales in 1904. There were four children of the marriage, all born in Fiji: Edna Joy 1905–1970; Eben Rainsford1907-1987; Charles Rainsford 1912–1914; and Phyllis Ruth 1916–2000.
