= Wesleyan Theological Institution =

The Wesleyan Theological Institution was from 1863 until 1914 an Australian Methodist theological college located firstly in Silverwater, New South Wales and from 1881 at Stanmore, New South Wales.

== History ==
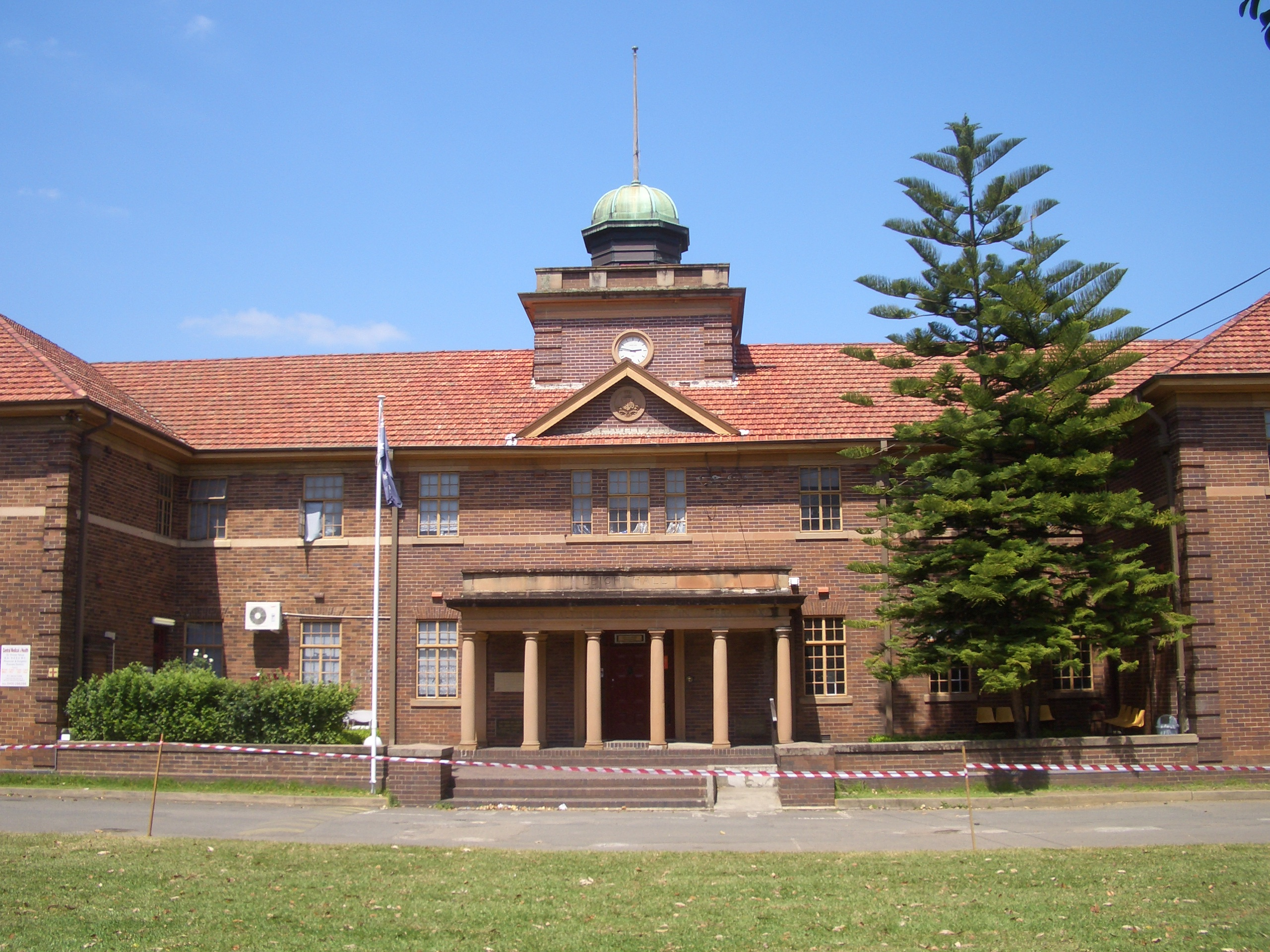
Leigh College, at the Strathfield South site

At the Methodist Conference of 1862, the Revd John Manton proposed that a collegiate institute be founded in Sydney. On 16 July 1863, the Wesleyan Collegiate Institute opened with 16 boys and a small number of theological students. As no suitable buildings were available in Sydney at the time, Newington House, the centrepiece of John Blaxland's estate at Silverwater, was leased. The institution functioned as a boys' school, Newington College, and theological college. Expanding student numbers meant that more extensive premises closer to the city were required. A bequest by John Jones, of land at Stanmore, saw both institutions move to the newly fashionable inner-city suburbs. Seventy schoolboys and four theological students migrated from Silverwater to Stanmore and the theological college remained there until 1914. The NSW Conference of the Methodist Church purchased a house and grounds at 416-420 Liverpool Road, Strathfield South, New South Wales and moved the theological students there for the beginning of the 1915 academic year. The new institution was named Leigh College in honour of the Revd Samuel Leigh.

== Notable alumni ==
- Cyril Bavin – missionary in Fiji, migration advocate
- Howard Nolan – secretary of the NSW Conference of the Methodist Church of Australasia
- Rodger Page – missionary in Tonga, president of the Free Wesleyan Church of Tonga, royal chaplain
- Ernest Sommerlad – missionary in Fiji, member of the New South Wales Legislative Council
- B. Linden Webb – Methodist minister, peace activist
- Henry Worrall – Methodist minister, temperance advocate

== See also ==
- Newington College
- Leigh College
