= Leigh College =

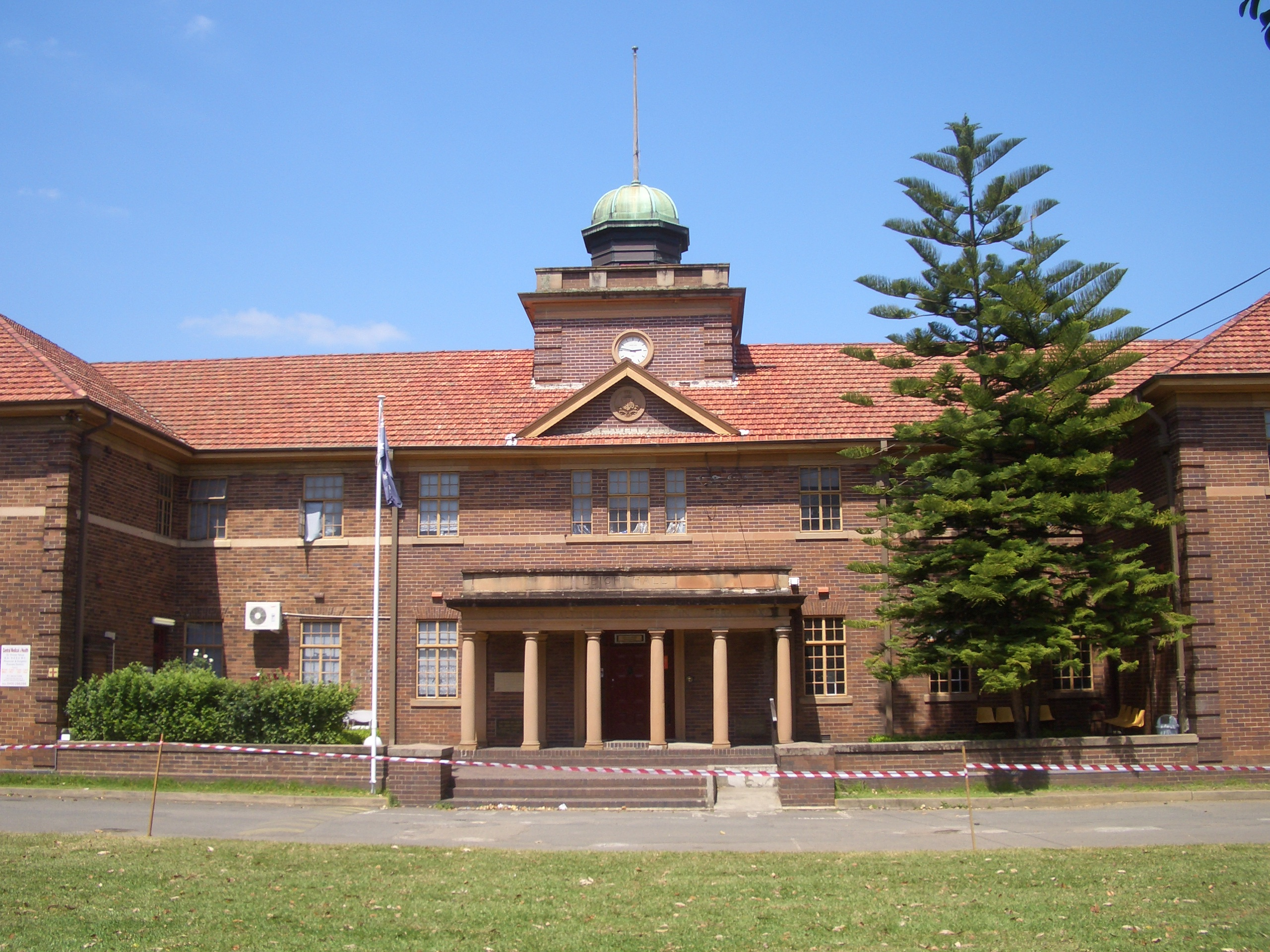
- Leigh Hall at the College

- Location within Sydney
- Interactive map of Leigh College

Monastery information
- Other names: Leigh Hall; United Theological College
- Denomination: Methodist
- Established: 1915

Architecture
- Status: Theological college
- Functional status: Closed
- Architect: Byera Hadley
- Style: Neo-Georgian Revival
- Groundbreaking: 1927
- Completed date: 1928 (Leigh Hall)
- Closed: 1974

Site
- Location: 416-420 Liverpool Road, Strathfield South, New South Wales
- Country: Australia
- Coordinates: 33°53′35″S 151°05′19″E
- Other information: Site occupied by the Australian International Academy

Leigh College was from 1915 until 1974 a Methodist theological college located at 416-420 Liverpool Road, Strathfield South, New South Wales. It was the successor to Wesleyan Theological Institution. The site includes three significant historic properties: Brundah, a Victorian style house; Leigh College Hall, a neo-Georgian Revival style building; and the E. Vickery Memorial Chapel.

== History ==
Brundah, a Victorian era Italianate house, was built on the site in the mid-1880s for a wine merchant, Thomas Alt. The house was home to the Alt family until 1911 and then was owned by Paul Lamarand. In 1915, the Methodist Church purchased the house and grounds and moved its theological students from Stanmore where they had shared the grounds of Newington College. The new college was named in honour of the Wesleyan missionary Samuel Leigh. In 1927, the foundation stone for a new building was laid by the Sir Dudley de Chair.

The new Leigh College was opened in 1928 to a design by Byera Hadley. Hadley also designed a chapel that was built in honour of the Hon. Ebenezer Vickery MLC. The site became the home of the United Theological College, a part of the theology school at Charles Sturt University, in 1974 with the union of Leigh College (Methodist), Camden College (Congregational Union of Australia) and St. Andrews College (Presbyterian Church). The new Uniting Church college moved in 1987 and the land was sub-divided.

The site became the home of Noor Al Houda Islamic College and is now the Australian International Academy.

== Heritage listings ==
The Memorial Chapel and Leigh Hall are listed on the Royal Australian Institute of Architects (NSW Chapter) Register of Twentieth Century Buildings of Significance and with Brundah are classified by the National Trust of Australia (NSW). The College site, including front and rear grounds, is also contained in the National Trust's Strathfield Urban Conservation Area Precinct 3.

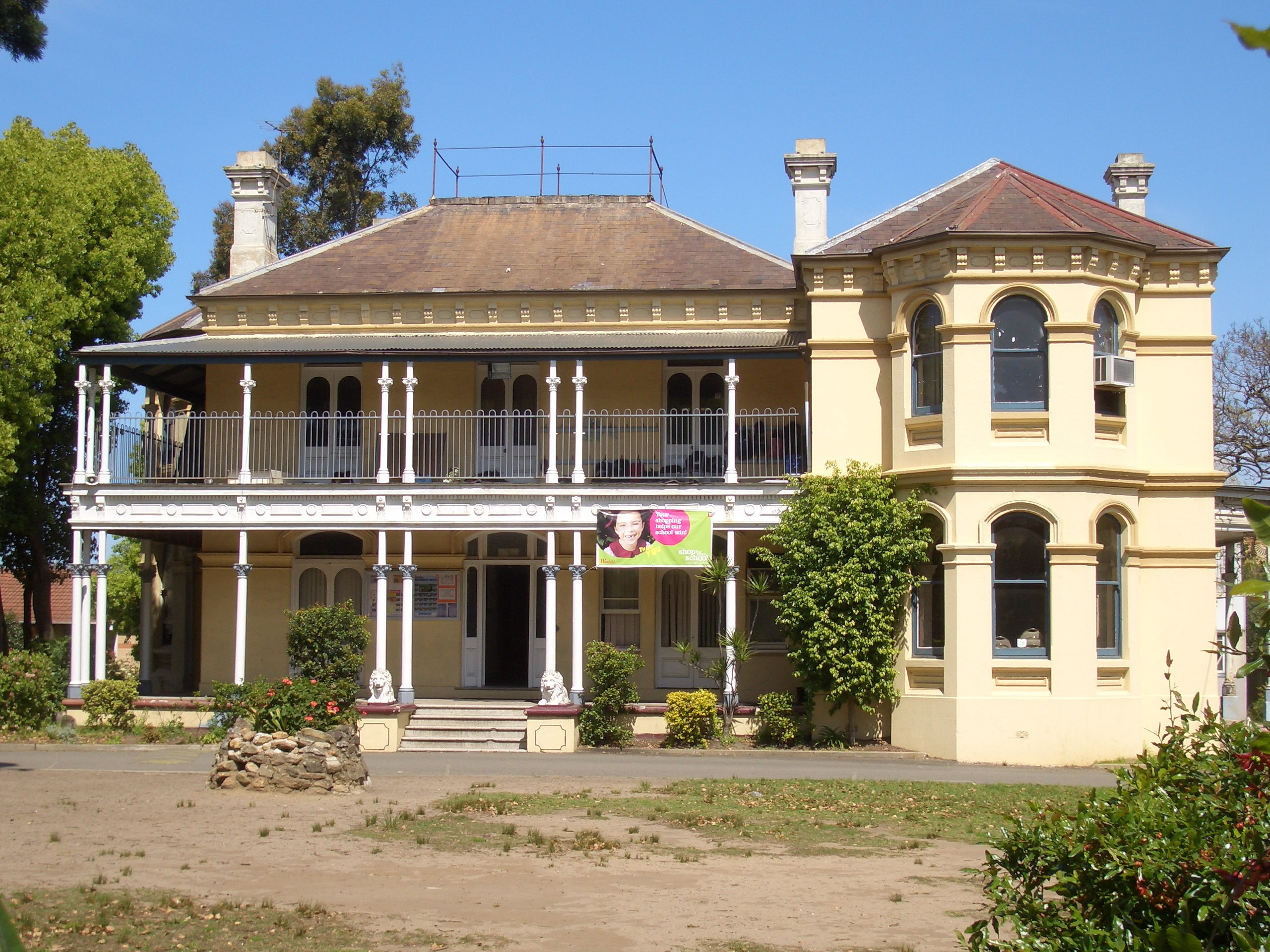
Brundah

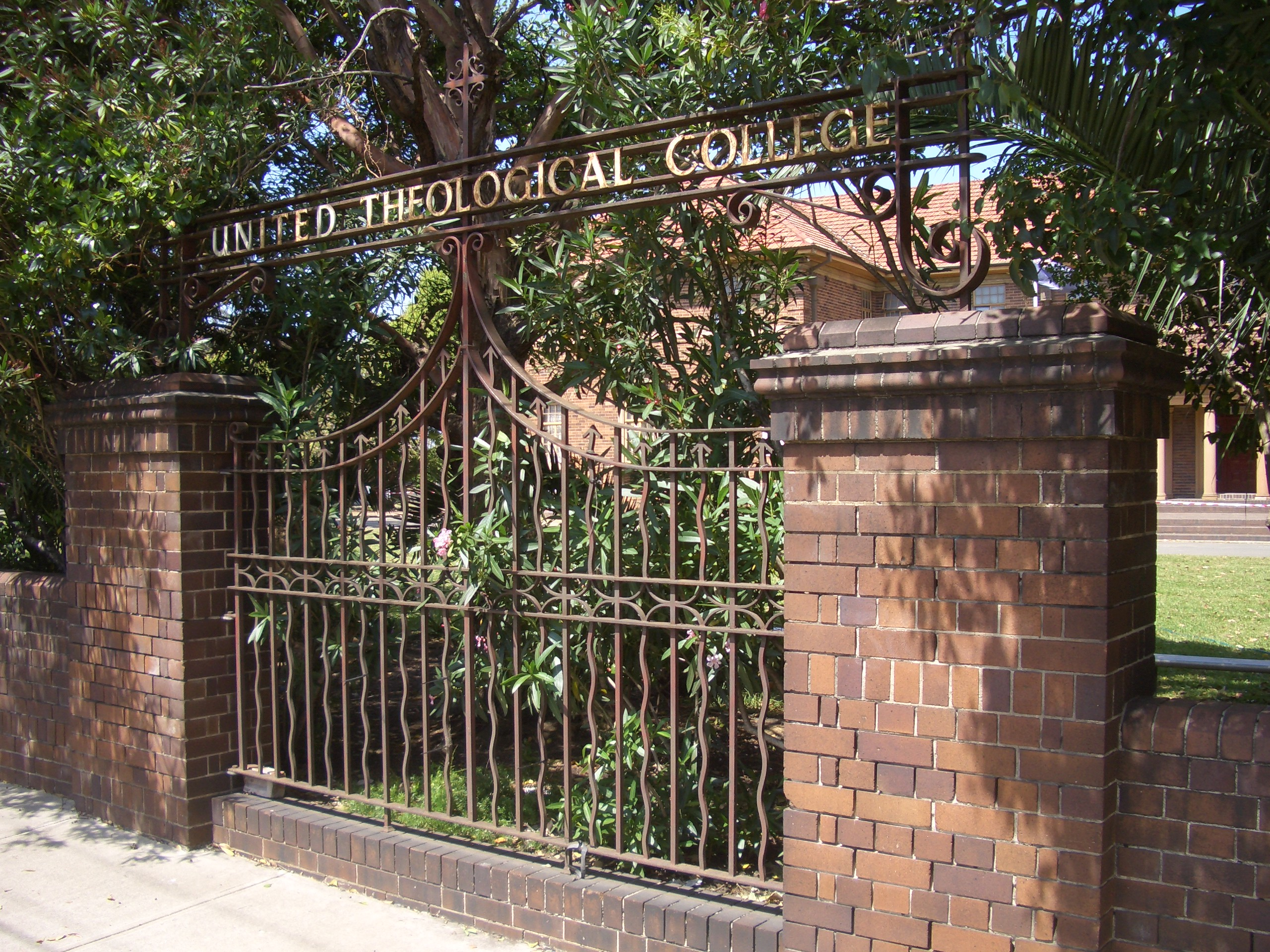
Gates
