= To Our Beloved Dead =

Poem by Leslie Holdsworth Allen

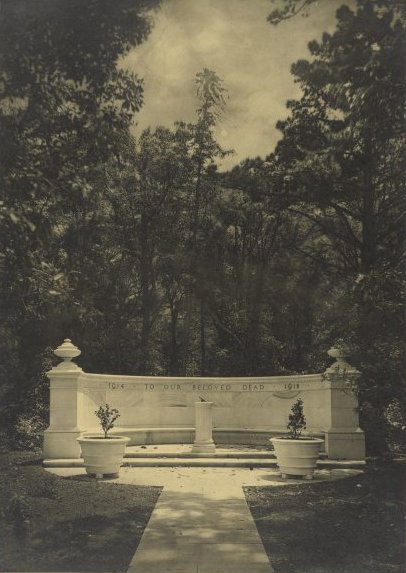
The 1922 Newington College War Memorial that inspired Leslie Holdsworth Allen to pen To our beloved dead was designed by William Hardy Wilson and photographed by Harold Cazneaux.

"To Our Beloved Dead" is a poem by the Australian poet and professor Leslie Holdsworth Allen.

== Inspiration ==
A sandstone war memorial was designed by architect William Hardy Wilson for Newington College and was dedicated on 11 May 1922 by the Governor-General of Australia, Henry Forster, 1st Baron Forster. Allen wrote the poem in memory of the occasion. The memorial comprises a semi-circular wall and seat, with pillars surmounted by white stone urns at either end and a column with a sundial in the centre.

The inscriptions on the wall and sundial read:

1914 - TO OUR BELOVED DEAD - 1918
TIME DIMS NOT THEIR SACRIFICE

== Text of poem ==
Approach this shrine of stone beneath the trees
and drink its whiteness, while the shadows move
Like the slow march of Time; mellowed and sweet.
Let the fine memories
Held in this quiet guard of love,
Thy soul with limpid mirroring repeat.

Above its chasteness the faint opal sky
Of dawn, the turquoise of the burning day,
The ruby vapours of the sunset, float
Like window-stains to lie
Tempering the sombre-shadowed bay
That bids thy prayer, sequestered and devote.

The dusty turmoil and the sultry blast
Intrude not here. this canopy of leaves
The gloom enriches where the dial-blade
Slays silently the Past.
Yet think not that thy spirit grieves
On evanescence eaten by a shade.

Time is no banquet for the barren jaws
Of death; it is received into a womb
Made quick with the eternal hour of God.
Be then thy reverent pause
No resignation faint. The Tomb
Masks deathlessness with the delusive sod.

Turn from this spot inviolate to the fields
Green with winter rain. The football leaps
From hand to hand in the swift passing-rush.
Vainly the last man shields
The touch-line, and an athlete sweeps
Behind the goal, lit with exhilarant flush.

That throng is immortality, the fire
Death quenched not in their fathers. Had they known
Their anguished fall was but a nothingness,
Would they, with blenched desire
Paling, have cried, “What can atone?”
Those shouts thy answer. Do they live the less?

Twofold the hero’s shrine, bequeathed life,
And life celestial. These twin urns shall hold
Not remnant ashes but their twofold birth;
For sacrificial strife
Is generation. So doth mould
The Potter’s hand the slow, unplastic earth.

The shouting swells. The game is at its height.
While here the imperceptible shadow glides
Swift pulses urge the monuments into rout.
Well that their prodigal flight
The dragging hours’ probation hides
When life is summons and the soul is doubt!

Yet tested man, kindling at every call.
Burns into faith, gladder with sterner proof,
And if the clarion call the flesh to bleed,
More glad, more glad than all.
Such were these fallen, not aloof,
But given full-hearted o the bitter need.

Live life, and live it swift in every vein,
Ye players! Let the vivid monuments fly!
Your hurrying life hoards the enduring mood
That steads the grown man’s pain
When, like these dead, prepared to die,
Ye hear the call with manhood’s even blood.

That hour will come. The scattered clouds of war
Growl on the swart horizon. Lust and Hate
Like half-tamed lions crouch upon the spring.
Ah, when the need is sore
Ye will not fail the fire innate
Your fathers gave you from their triumphing!

Silent the shrine of stone beneath the trees!
The players’ shouting with the ended flight
Dies at the edges of this glimmering bower.
The dial fades, and cease
The eking minutes ’neath the night.
Heaven’s fountain breaks and rains the eternal hour.
