= George Shann =

George Shann (28 October 1876 – 2 January 1919) was a British politician.

Born in Knaresborough, Shann grew up in Bradford. He began working half-time in a spinning mill at the age of ten, then five years later moved to a woolcombing mill. He studied in his limited spare time, and won a scholarship to the Bradford Technical College, where he excelled; in 1896, he attended the University of Aberdeen, again on a prize scholarship, and from 1898, he was at the University of Glasgow, graduating in economics.

In Glasgow, Shann worked as warden of the student settlement, and this experience inspired him to join the Fabian Society. He moved to Birmingham in 1904, lecturing at the University of Birmingham, and teaching at the Woodbrooke Settlement. He was also elected as a Labour Party member of King's Norton Urban District Council. In his spare time, Shann campaigned against sweatshops, and became the first secretary of the National Anti-Sweating League. This led him to join the Workers' Union and the Independent Labour Party (ILP), and in 1911 he was elected to Birmingham City Council, acting as the Labour and ILP group secretary.

Shann supported Britain entry into World War I, putting himself at odds with the majority of the ILP, from which he resigned. In 1915, he left the council to join the mechanical transport section of the British Army; he was selected as an alderman, but was unable to play any part in council activities as he was on overseas service.

Despite his estrangement from the ILP, Shann remained active in the Labour Party, and stood in the 1918 UK general election as its candidate for Birmingham Yardley. He took second place and was not elected. He became ill shortly after the result was announced, and died at the start of 1919.
