= B. Linden Webb =

Australian Christian minister and pacifist

The Reverend B. Linden Webb
- Born: 25 November 1884; Bathurst, New South Wales
- Died: 28 June 1968 (aged 83); Mosman, New South Wales
- Education: Newington College; Wesleyan Theological Institution
- Spouse: Eleanor (née Dunbar)
- Parent(s): Edmund Tom Webb; Fanny Edgeworth Webb (née Byrnes)
- Church: Methodist Church of Australasia
- Ordained: 1908
- Writings: The religious significance of the war (1915); The sun shines on (1967)

Bernard Linden Webb (25 November 1884 – 28 June 1968) was an Australian Christian minister and pacifist. During both World Wars he resigned from active ministry within the Methodist Church of Australasia because of his opposition to his nation's military engagement.

It was said of him on his death, that "he sought and found an expression for religious faith that satisfied both the demands of the spirit and the temper of the age ... for all his gentle modesty he was inflexibly firm and courageous in maintaining his convictions. He believed that war is utterly wrong."

The peace activism of the 1960s within the Methodist Church grew from Webb's pioneering pacifist theology of earlier years.

== Early life ==
Webb was born in Bathurst, New South Wales, the fifth of seven children of Edmund Tom Webb and Fanny Edgeworth Webb (née Byrnes). He was a grandson of Edmund Webb and William Tom. His family were prosperous and well-connected in business and political circles. Webb attended Newington College, as had his father, and commenced in 1899. In 1902, his final year at Newington, he was appointed as the Senior Prefect. The following year Webb went up to the University of Sydney and read in the faculty of arts. He had planned to become a lawyer, but during his second year of university "he felt the call to preach". He graduated as a Bachelor of Arts in 1906. Webb chose service to the church over a career as a lawyer and became a graduate student at the Wesleyan Theological Institution which was then still based in the grounds of his Alma Mater, Newington College.

== Early ministry ==
After ordination, Webb served as a probationer in the North Sydney circuit. He then moved to Moss Vale and served in that circuit from early 1909 to early 1911. Later in 1911 Webb took a leave of absence and traveled to England with his new wife. On his return to Australia in 1912 he served at Tighes Hill in the Hamilton and Wickham circuit of Newcastle. In 1913 Webb was unwell and spent time within the Central Methodist Mission on sick leave and light duties.

== Hay Circuit ==
In March 1914 the New South Wales Methodist Conference appointed Webb to Hay, New South Wales. World War I had just started as he arrived to take up his new appointment and he soon gave a series of sermons critical of war. These were later published. The recruiting sergeant in Hay asked Webb to encourage young men in his congregation to support the war effort. All other ministers in Hay agreed to such requests but Webb refused to assist. For two and a half years the young minister found himself at odds with his congregation and broader community. Webb eventually found "the moral implications of Christian doctrine" inconsistent with those of the Methodist Church and he resigned from the ministry. He returned to the Central Methodist Mission in Sydney without pastoral charge before moving to Moss Vale in the Southern Highlands of New South Wales. During this period Webb did not work as a minister but tried to support his family by teaching elocution, farming and selling fruit and clothing door-to-door.

== Later ministry ==
He returned to full-time Methodist ministry in 1920 and served in the Muswellbrook circuit for twelve months. The next three years were spent in Toronto, New South Wales, before moving to Sydney and serving in Gordon. In 1927 Webb left the mainland to serve on Norfolk Island. As pacifist principles flourished in the Methodist church of the 1930s Webb became physically frail and suffered from poor health. He returned to service in Sydney in 1936 when he was appointed to the Summer Hill church. For the remaining years of the decade Webb was in Campbelltown, New South Wales, and Kensington. As Australia was again at war Webb considered "that his pacifist principles were not consistent with his work in the church" and he again resigned from ministry. He aligned himself with Methodist ministers such as Alan Walker during World War II. In these years he supported his family by selling fruit and vegetables. After the war he re-entered the ministry but his health was bad and he became a supernumerary in Helensburgh, New South Wales.

== Marriage, family and death ==
In 1911, Webb married Eleanor Dunbar in Sydney. The union produced three daughters and a son. Eleanor Webb died in 1966. A daughter owned the Rima Private Hospital in Mosman and Webb moved there for the last years of his life. He died aged 83 following a stroke on 28 June 1968 and his funeral was held at the Mosman Methodist Church.

== Publications ==
- The religious significance of the war with a foreword by W.H. Beale (1915)
- The sun shines on – selected poems and songs (1967)
