= Louisa Bevan =

Australian charity worker (1844–1933)

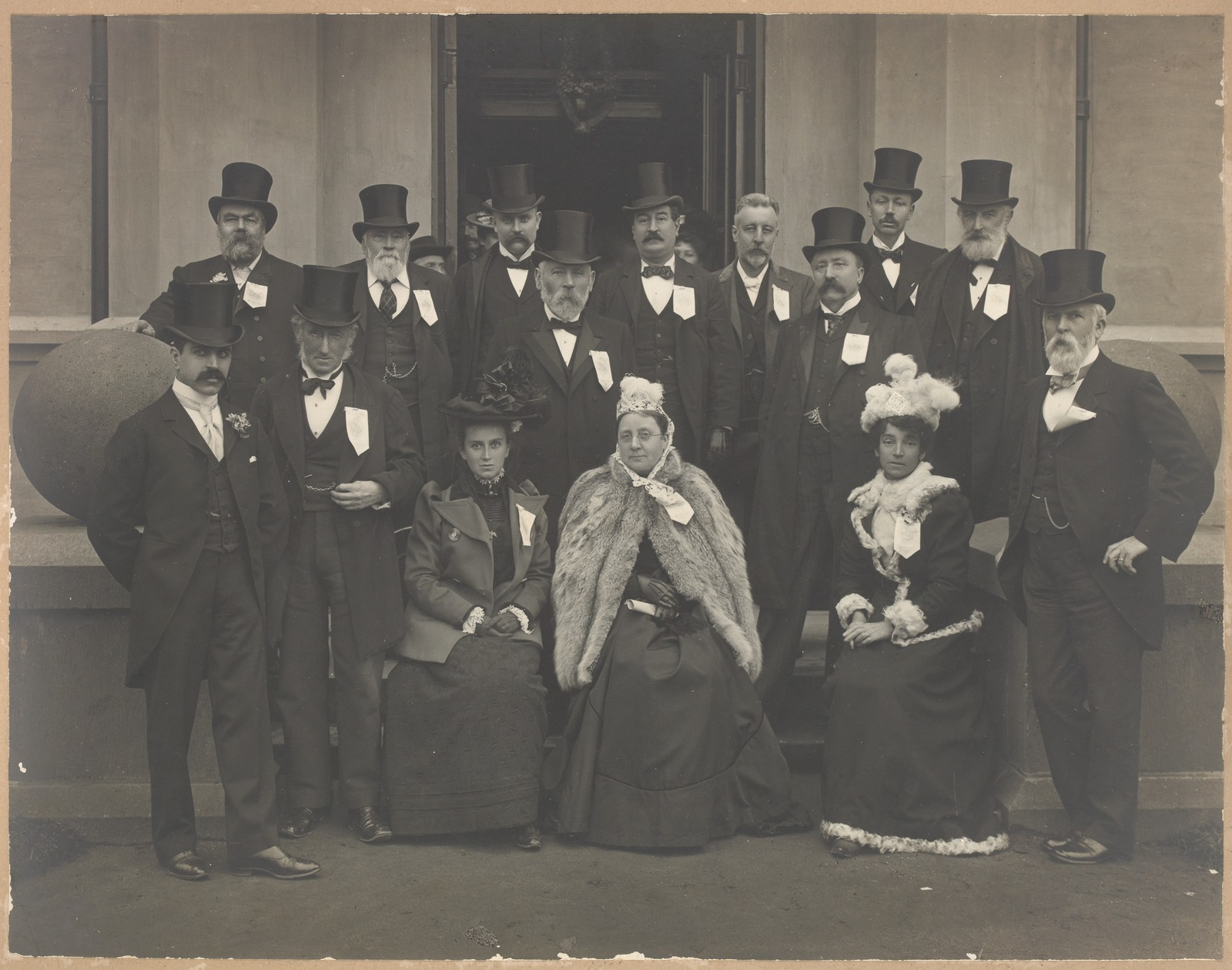
- Bevan, 1900
- Born: Louisa Jane Willett; 11 April 1844; Norwich, Norfolk, United Kingdom
- Died: 12 September 1933 (aged 89); Upper Beaconsfield, Victoria, Australia
- Board member of: Vice-president of National Council of Women of Victoria; Committee member of the Benevolent Asylum
- Spouse: Llewelyn David Bevan (m. 1870; died 1918)
- Children: 8 including: David Bevan (judge)

Louisa Bevan (born Louisa Jane Willett, 11 April 1844 – 12 September 1933), was an Australian charity worker who lived in Melbourne, Australia. She was the inaugural vice-president of the National Council of Women of Victoria, and one of the first three women elected to committee the Benevolent Asylum in 1898. She also founded an order called the Daughters of the Court, and held the position of the High Dame.

== Biography ==
=== Early life ===
Bevan was born in Norwich, Norfolk on 11 April 1844 to Mary Ann Willett nee Oxley, and John Willett. After the death of her father, the family moved to Southampton. She taught a bible class for young women until her marriage to Llewelyn David Bevan on 2 April 1870. She was also a member of the Above Bar Chapel.

In 1879, while in New York, Bevan fell from a hammock and sustained a spinal injury. She had to lay on her back for seven years, and eventually recovered in Australia, although she was unable to sit in a regular chair.

=== Occupation ===
She was elected as one of the first vice presidents of the National Council of Women of Victoria. Although she and others on the council were suffragists, the council itself stayed out of the suffrage movement until 1906.

In October 1890 she founded an order called the 'Daughters of the Court', which was later called 'Friends in Council'. Bevan held the title of High Dame of the order. When visiting Queensland and Western Australia, Bevan started several coteries which were the groups within the 'Daughter of the Court'.

In 1898, Bevan was elected to the board of the Benevolent Asylum. Constance Stone, and Lilian Alexander were also elected, and they were the first women on the council. In December of the same year, Bevan and her husband were woken up by an intruder in their home who robbed them at gunpoint.

In July of 1903, Bevan, in her role as the vice-president of the National Council of Women of Victoria, addressed the Woman's Christian Temperance Union of Queensland and suggested they form a Queensland branch of the council. This was the first recorded suggestion of a Queensland council.

=== Death ===
She died at Upper Beaconsfield, Victoria on 12 September 1933 at the home of her daughter.

== Bibliography ==
=== Books ===
- The Life and Reminiscences of Llewelyn David Bevan Compiled and edited by Louisa Jane Bevan (1920: Melbourne).
