= Leslie Holdsworth Allen =

Australian academic and poet (1879–1964)

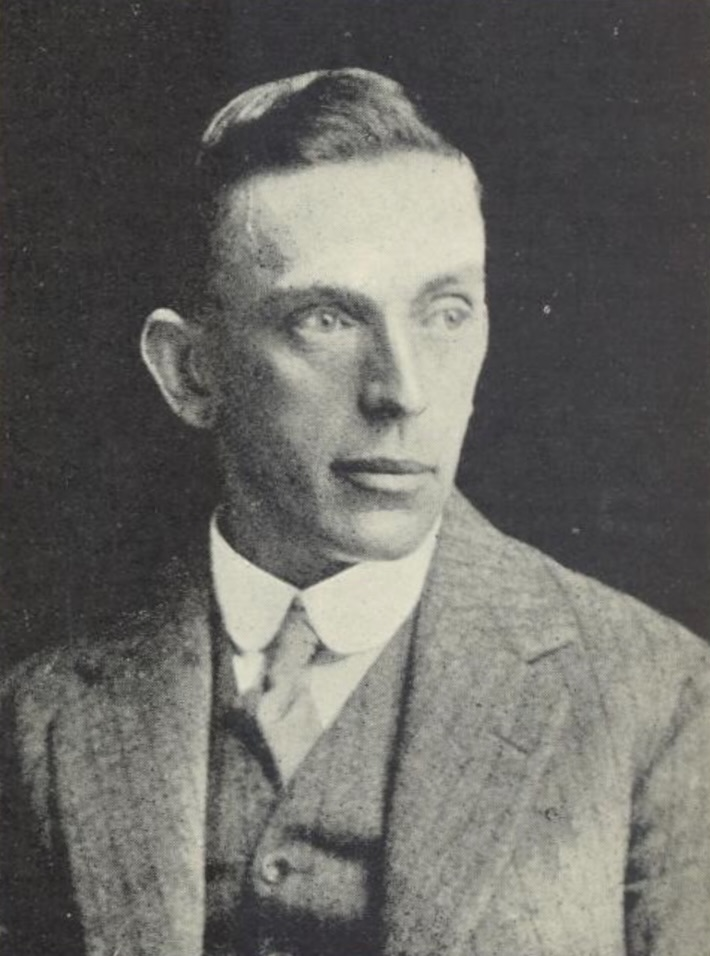
- Allen in 1927
- Born: 21 June 1879; Maryborough, Victoria
- Died: 5 January 1964 (aged 84); Moruya, New South Wales
- Education: Newington College; University of Sydney
- Occupations: Professor & poet
- Spouse: Dora (née Bavin)
- Children: A son and a daughter
- Parents: Rev. William Allen (father); Martha Jane, née Holdsworth (mother)

Leslie Holdsworth Allen (21 June 1879 – 5 January 1964) was an Australian academic and poet. He was Professor of English at the Royal Military College, Duntroon, the senior lecturer of English and Latin at Canberra University College and chairman of the Literature Censorship Board.

== Early life ==
Allen was born in Maryborough, Victoria, the second son of William Allen, a Congregational minister and the older brother of Sir Carleton Allen and his wife Martha Jane, née Holdsworth. He was eleven when his family moved to Sydney where he attended Newington College (1894–1899). He later attended the University of Sydney and the University of Leipzig (PhD).

== Academic career ==
In 1911, Allen was appointed as a senior lecturer in classics and English at Sydney Teachers College. After his marriage in 1915 to Dora Bavin (sister of Sir Thomas Bavin, Lancelot Bavin and Major Cyril Bavin OBE) he became professor of English at the Royal Military College, Duntroon. During his tenue at Duntroon he produced plays for the Canberra Society of Arts and Literature and wrote poetry and children's verse. In 1931, he became the sole lecturer in English and classics at Canberra University College (now the Australian National University).

== Censorship ==
Allen was appointed in 1933 as a member of the Commonwealth Book Censorship Advisory Committee. From 1937 he was chairman of the Literature Censorship Board.

== Family life ==
His wife Dora was tubercular and she died in 1932 predeceased by their only son. On his death in Moruya, New South Wales, he was survived by his only daughter.

== Honours ==
The Haydon-Allen Lecture Theatre is in part a memorial to his work at the Australian National University.

== Publications ==
- Gods and Wood-Things (1913)
- Phaedra: and Other Poems (1921)
- Araby: and Other Poems (1924)
- Patria (1941)

== Selected works ==
- To our beloved dead (1922)
