= Alexander Gosman =

Alexander Gosman (21 February 1829 – 15 January 1913) was a Congregational minister in Victoria, Australia.

== History ==
Gosman was born in Crail, Scotland, son of John Gosman and Catherine Gosman, née Auchterlonie. He attended local schools and after three years in business started teaching in Dundee and Greenock, followed by Glasgow High School and the Glasgow Asylum for the Blind, where he also served as pastor. In 1850 he entered the University of Glasgow and studied for the ministry at the Congregational Theological Hall. He was ordained as a Congregational minister at Haddington, East Lothian in 1855.

In 1860 he was sent to Australia by the Colonial Missionary Society, arrived at Melbourne on 21 September 1860, and began preaching at the Ballarat Congregational Church a month later.

In 1863 he was called to the Independent Church, Alma Road, St Kilda.

In 1864 he was appointed lecturer at the Congregational College of Victoria and later served as professor of English and metaphysics. In 1876 he was appointed its principal.

From 1878 to 1905 he was pastor of the Congregational Church at Hawthorn, Victoria.

== Recognition and other appointments ==
Gosman was

- elected chairman of the Congregational Union of Victoria in 1869, 1883, 1895 and 1904.
- the first chairman of the Congregational Union of Australasia in 1904-07.
- a delegate to the first International Congregational Council in 1891 and to the following council at Boston in 1899.
- president of the Anti-Sweating League for seven years.

In 1904 he was awarded a doctorate of divinity by the University of St Andrews.

== Family ==
In September 1857 he married Jane Buchanan of Alexandria, Dumbartonshire. Their children included:

- John Gosman ( – ) married Constance Everitt Surname ( – 28 January 1931). An accountant and sheep breeder, in 1895 he was charged with a snatch and grab offence, dismissed as a case of mistaken identity.
- eldest daughter married John Livingstone, later of Cardiff, Wales.
- Catherine Auchterlonie "Katie" Gosman (c. 1859 – 15 April 1895) married Thomas Underwood Groube on 20 September 1882.
- Janie Buchanan Gosman married William Warren Kerr on 7 April 1887.
- William Alexander Gosman (c. 1866 – 30 December 1940) married Gliezs Grindlay on 28 March 1900; they had two daughters. He has been named as a co-founder of Camberwell Grammar School with Alfred S. Hall, acting as co-principals 1891–1897. He was assistant metallurgist for Mount Lyell Mining & Railway Company at Queenstown, Tasmania c. 1910–1940.
