= Congregational College of Victoria =

The Congregational College of Victoria, also known as Victorian Congregational College, was a college of the University of Melbourne, established by the Congregational Church of Victoria to train prospective ministers.

It had its origin with the arrival in 1853 of Revs. Richard Fletcher (died 1861) and John Legg Poore. A building on Madeline Street north, Carlton (the Elgin Street corner), was purchased by the Congregational College Committee for a "remarkably low price"; it had been built as an hotel but never operated as such. The official opening was on 14 May 1862, but a year passed before it was ready for students.

In 1870 the premises were sold to the Church of England for a high school, their fee-paying but lower-cost alternative to grammar schools.

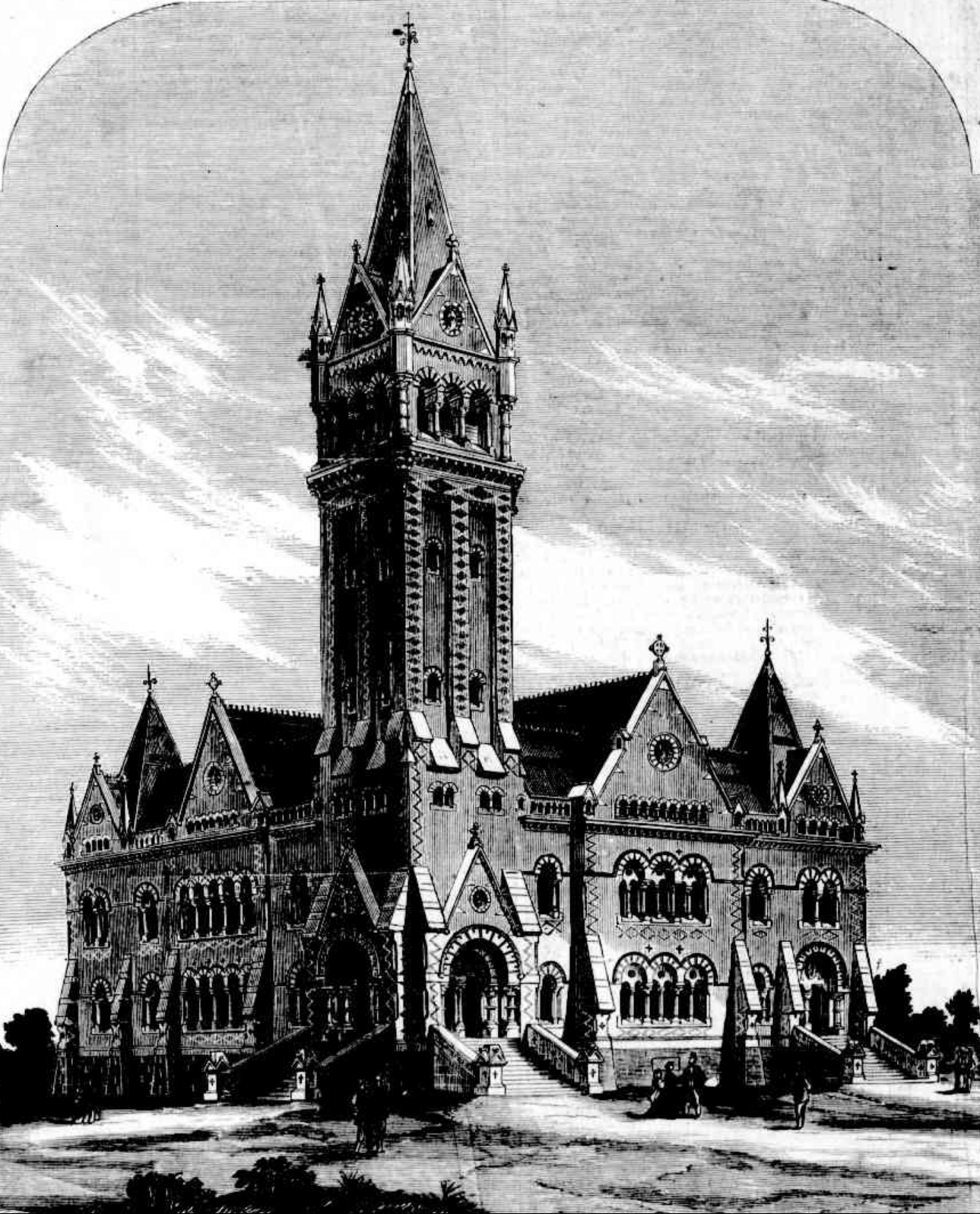
Independent church, Melbourne

In September 1865 Rev. Anketell M. Henderson arrived in Melbourne by the ship Kosciusko to replace Rev. J. P. Sunderland as pastor of the Richmond Congregational Church, in addition to his appointment as first president of the college. Within a year he was reassigned to the Collins Street church, while Roby Fletcher was allocated the Richmond church and appointed a professor at the college.

Henderson was largely responsible for replacing the old Independent church building, whose foundation stone was laid on 3 September 1839, at the intersection of Russell and Collins streets with a stately new church with hall and library, later known as St Michael's Uniting Church. In the meantime he conducted services at the old Theatre Royal (it was destroyed by fire in April 1872), attracting a large and vibrant congregation, which he retained when the new church building was opened on 25 August 1867. Henderson died nine years later.

Subsequently, College lectures, ceremonies and other activities were held in the Independent (i.e. Congregational) church building. The college library became the meeting room of the Council of Churches in Victoria, and Congregational Council of Victoria.

In 1875 the college was opened to aspiring Baptist ministers, bringing the number of students from five in 1874 to ten.

Henderson died in 1876 and replaced as president by Rev. Alexander Gosman.

== Principals ==
- 1865: Anketell M. Henderson
- 1876: A. Gosman
- 1913: R. A. Betts
- 1914: W. J. Cocks
- 1919: J. S. Griffith (died 10 May 1939)
- 1940: James Douglas Northey (1890–1975)

== Staff ==
- In 1877 the professorial staff included Revs. A. Gosman, J. Reid, and Andrew Harper.
- In 1912 lecturers included Revs. A. R. Stephenson, A. S. Devenish, F. V. Pratt, and W. D. McLaren.

== Notable alumni ==
These are mentioned in Australian Dictionary of Biography:

- Walter Albiston
- Horace William Allen
- Leslie Holdsworth Allen
- William Allen (1847–1919)
- Louisa Jane Bevan
- Jacob John Halley
- Isabelle Elizabeth Merry
- Griffithes Wheeler Thatcher
- Henry Thomas Wells

== See also ==
- Parkin College in Adelaide
- Pilgrim Theological College
- Congregational Union of Australia
