= List of Old Newingtonians =

This page lists notable Old Newingtonians, alumni of the GPS Uniting Church school Newington College in Sydney, Australia. Enrolment years at Newington are bracketed following the surname.

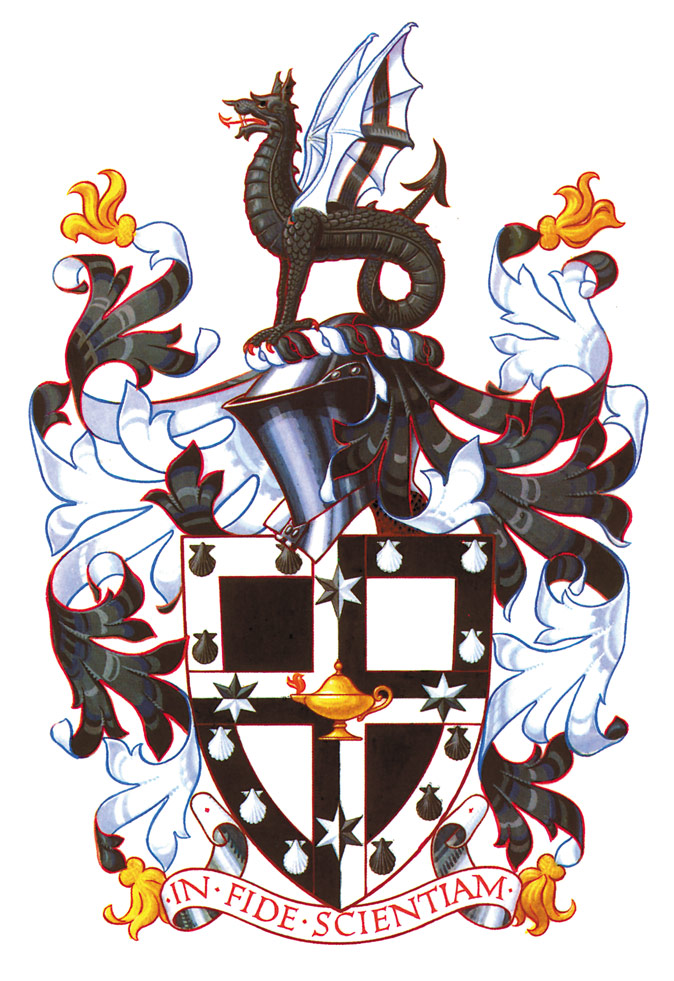
Newington College Coat of Arms

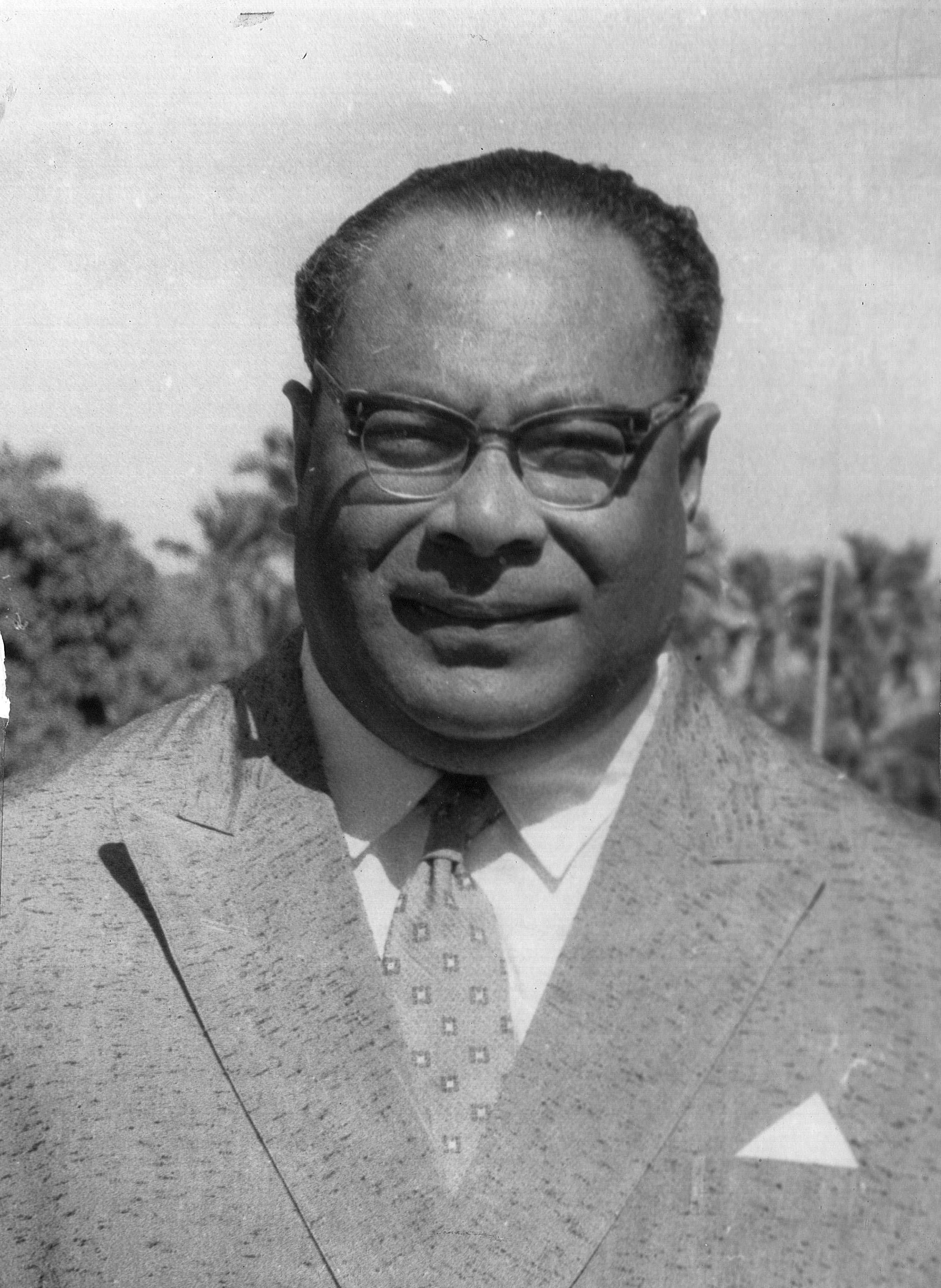
HM King Tāufaʻāhau Tupou IV

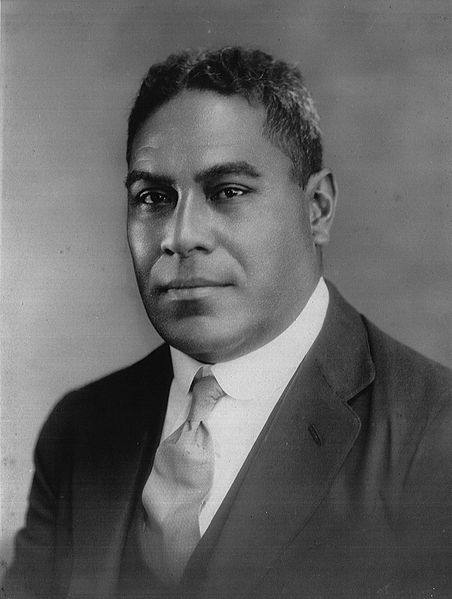
HRH Prince Viliami Tungī Mailefihi

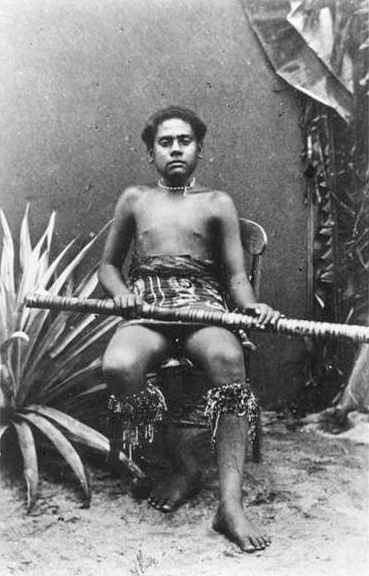
HH Prince Josefa Celua of Fiji

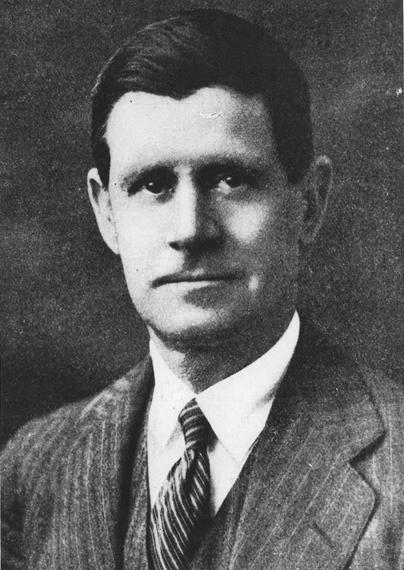
NSW Premier The Hon Sir Thomas Bavin KCMG

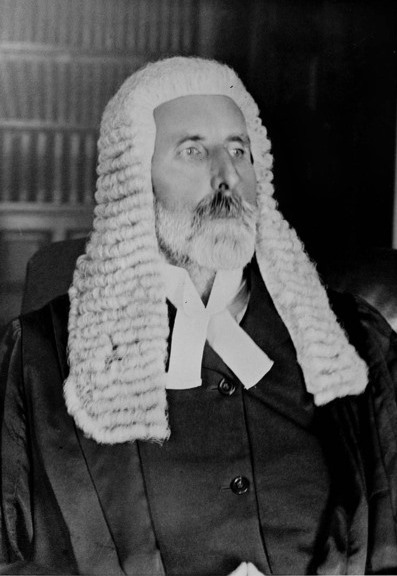
NSW Attorney-General The Hon Andrew Lysaght

NSW Opposition Leader The Hon Lt Col Murray Robson CBE DSO

NSW Speaker The Hon Reginald Weaver

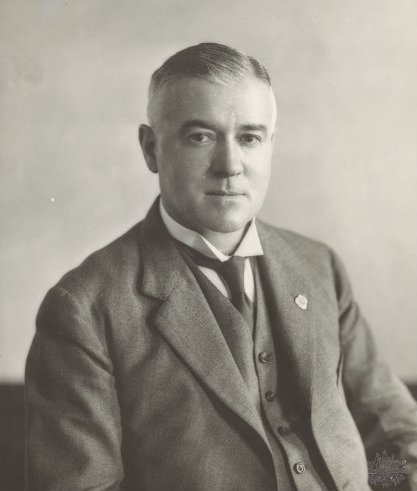
Commonwealth Health Minister The Hon Sir Charles Marr KCVO DSO MC

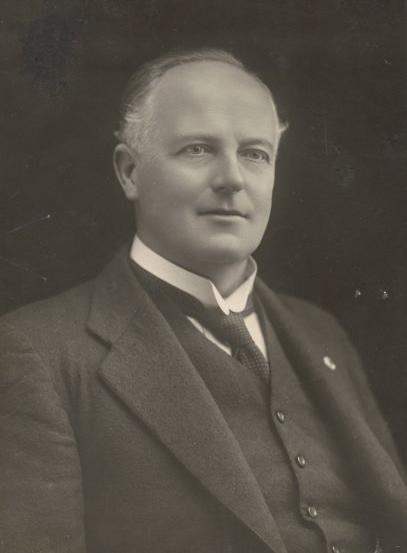
Commonwealth Defence Minister The Hon Eric Bowden

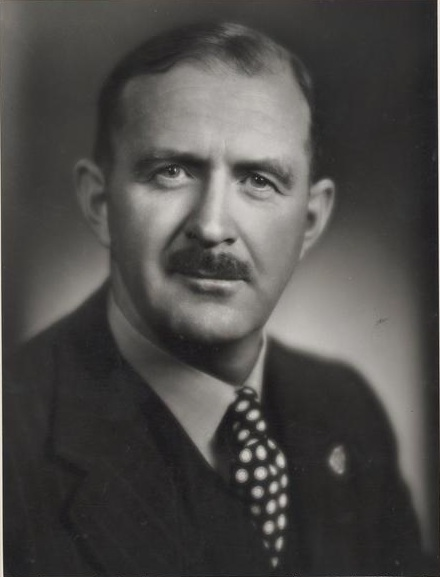
Commonwealth and NSW parliamentarian Jeff Bate

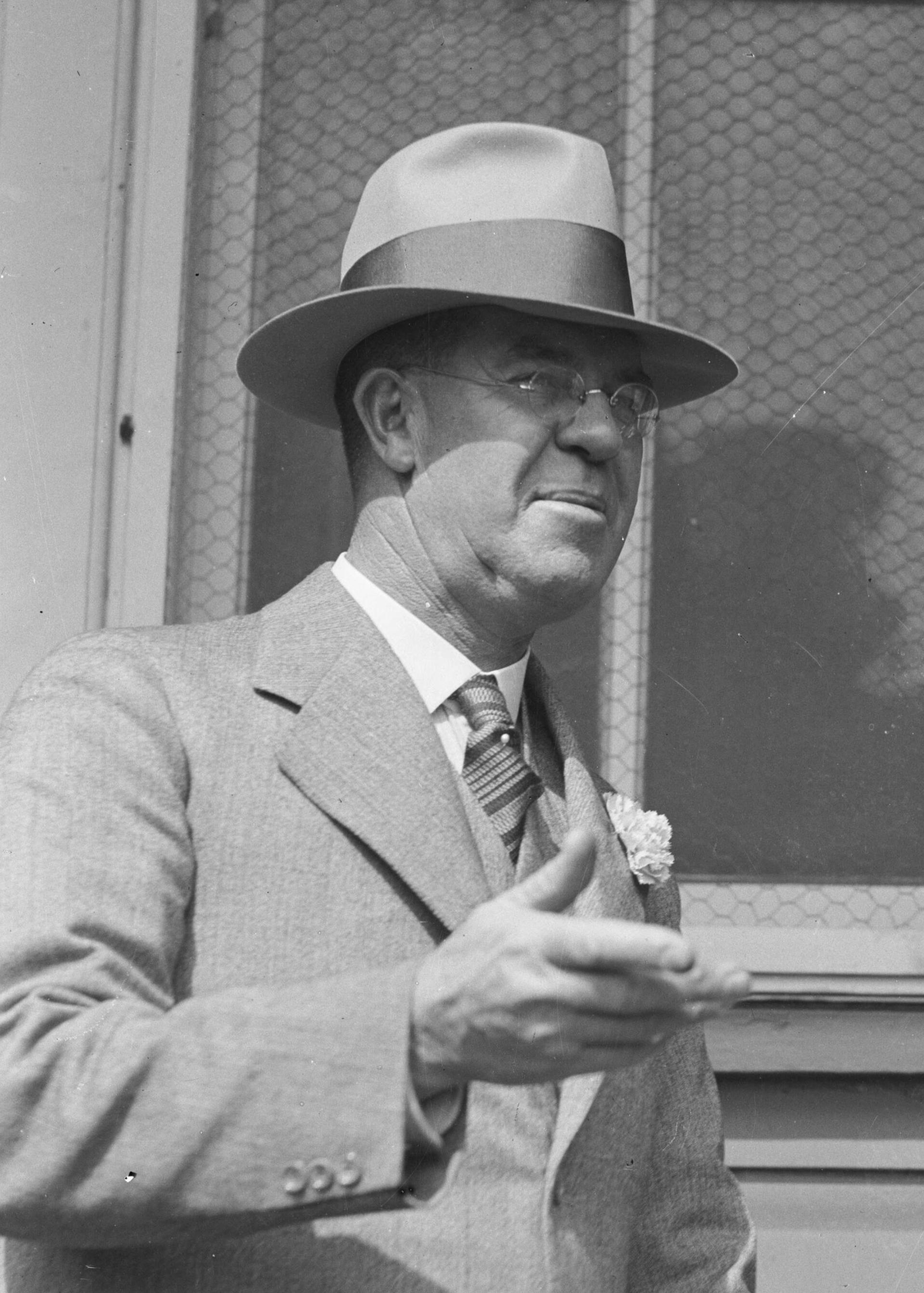
NSW parliamentarian Carl Glasgow

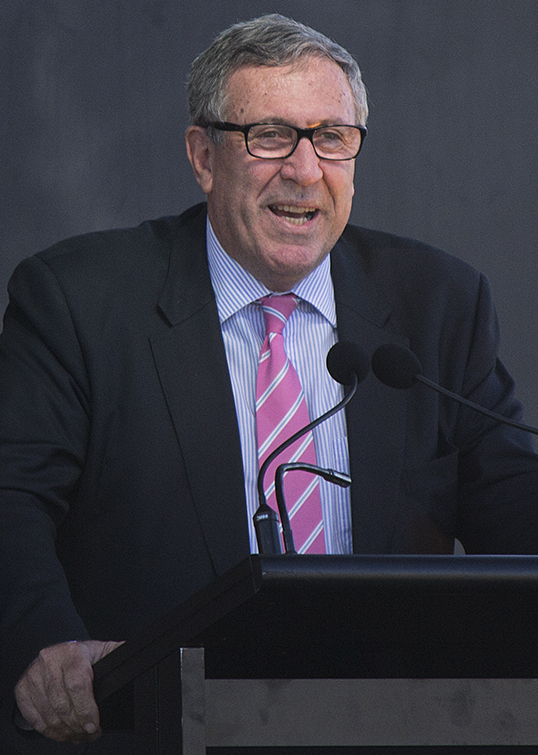
NSW parliamentarian The Hon Duncan Gay AM

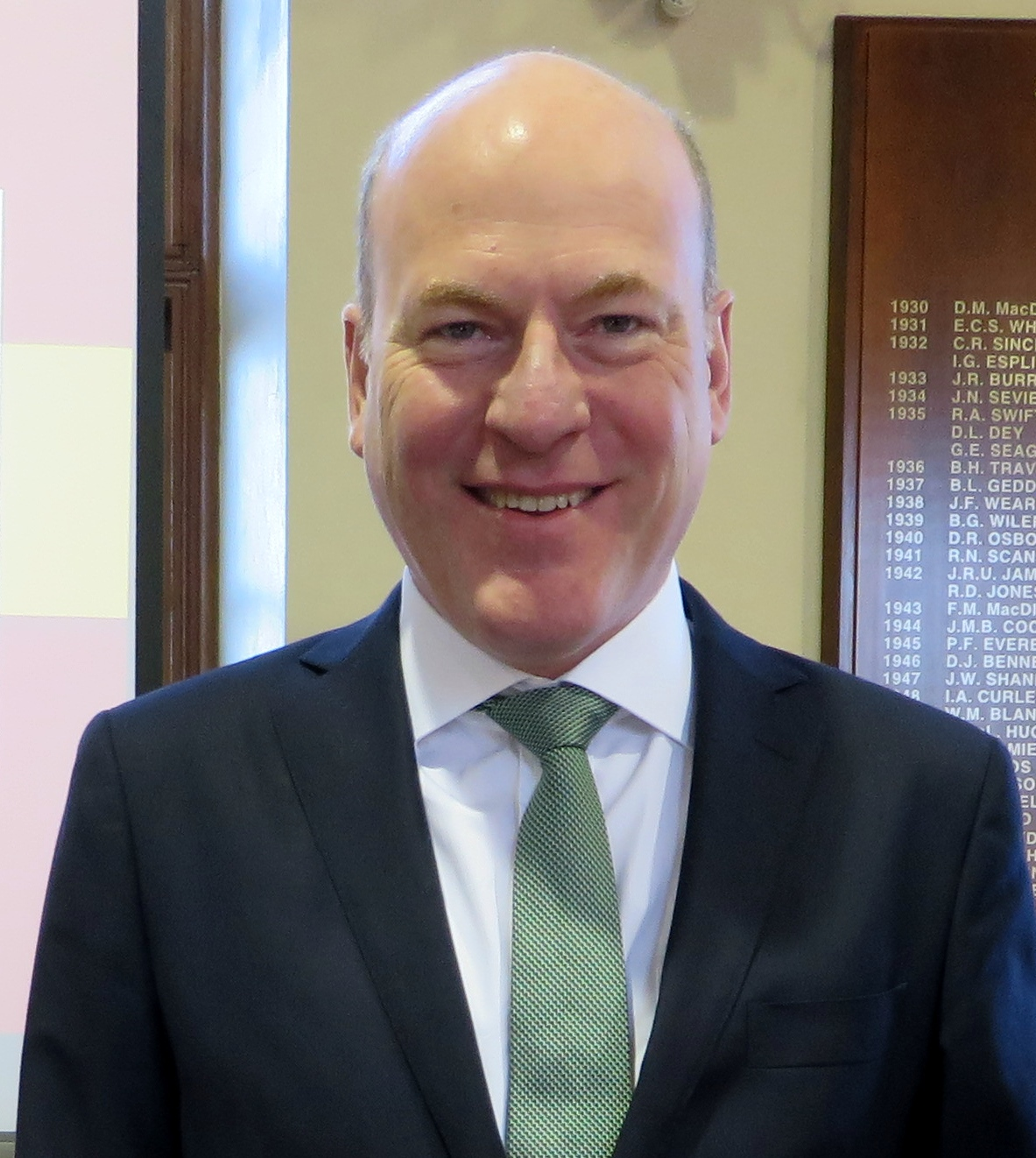
Federal parliamentarian Trent Zimmerman

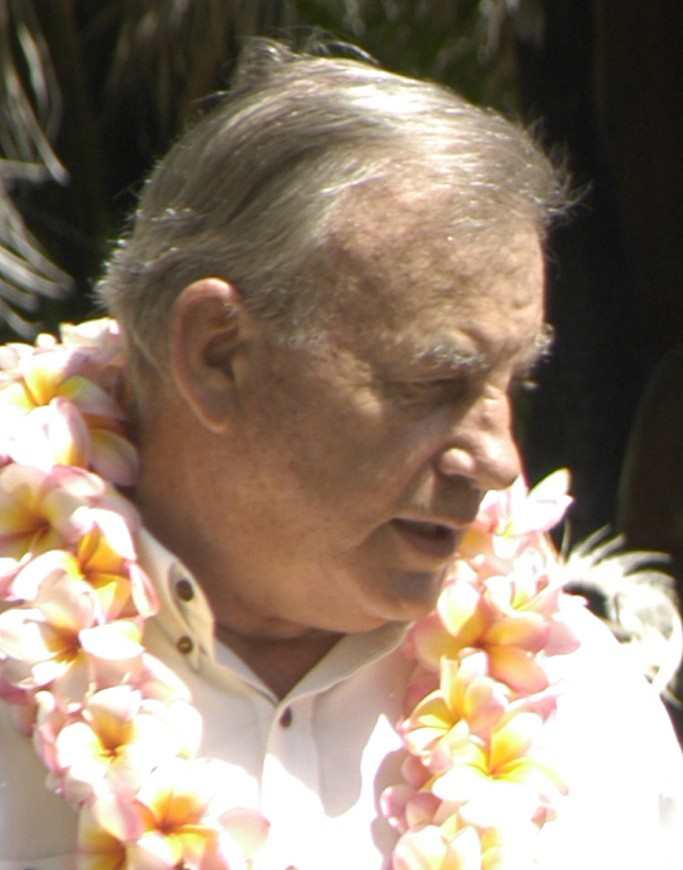
PNG Minister Sir Peter Barter GCL OBE

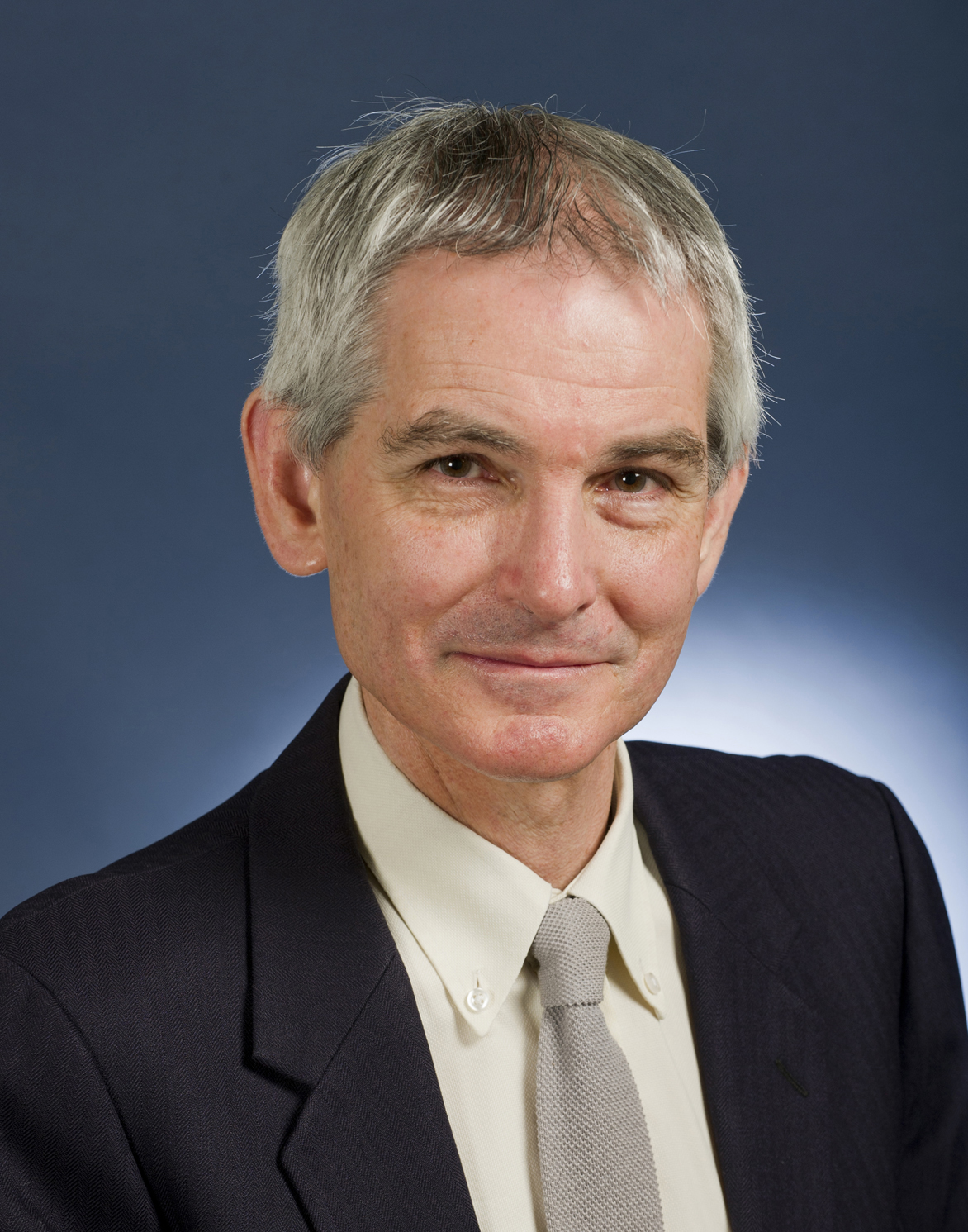
Former Australian Ambassador to France His Excellency Ric Wells

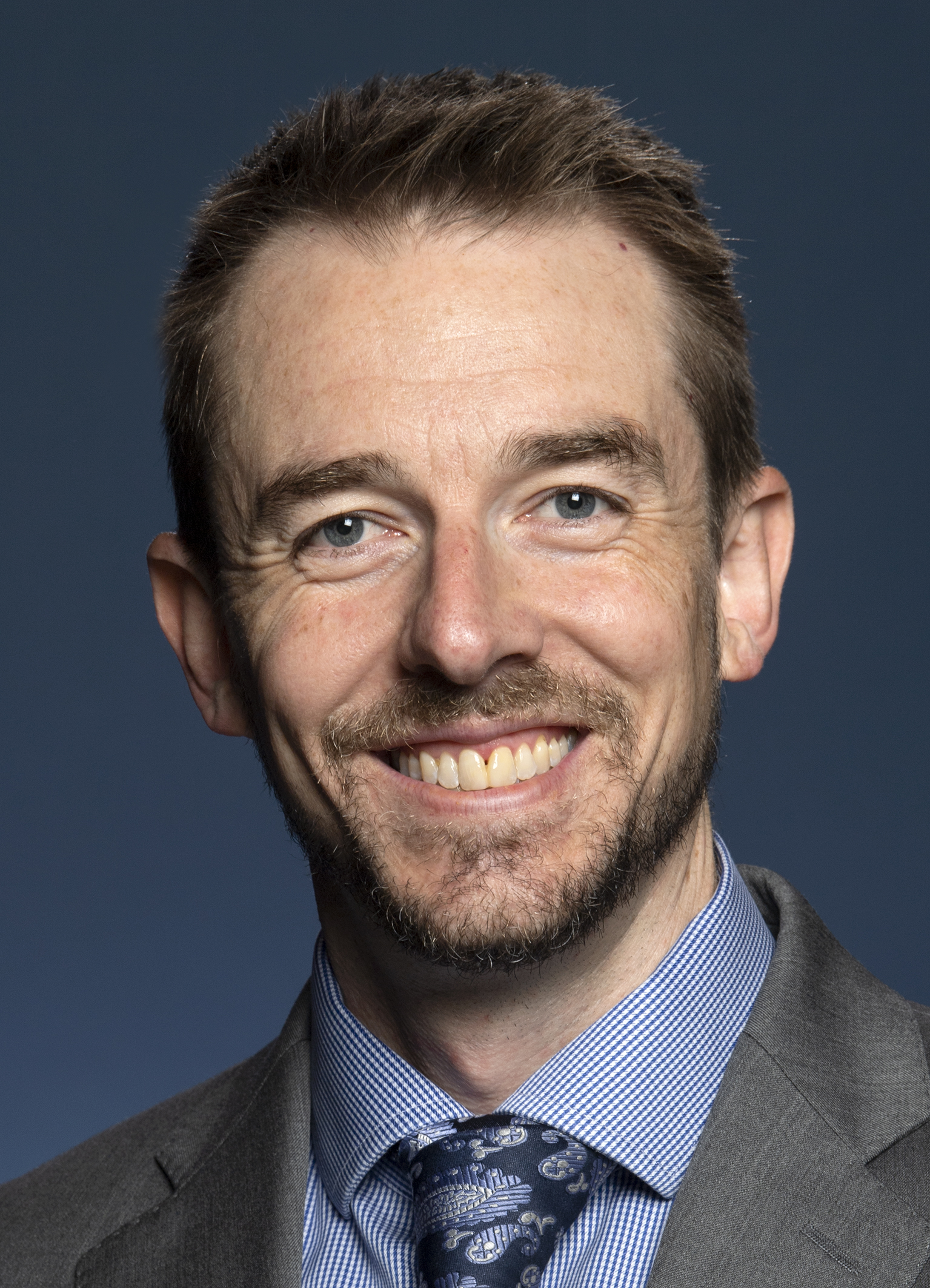
Former Australian High Commissioner to Kiribati His Excellency David Yardley

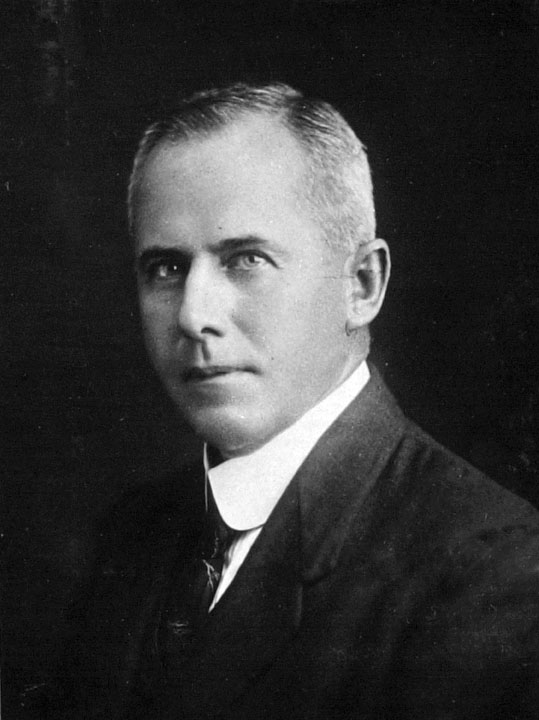
Former Queensland Director of Agriculture Harold Quodling

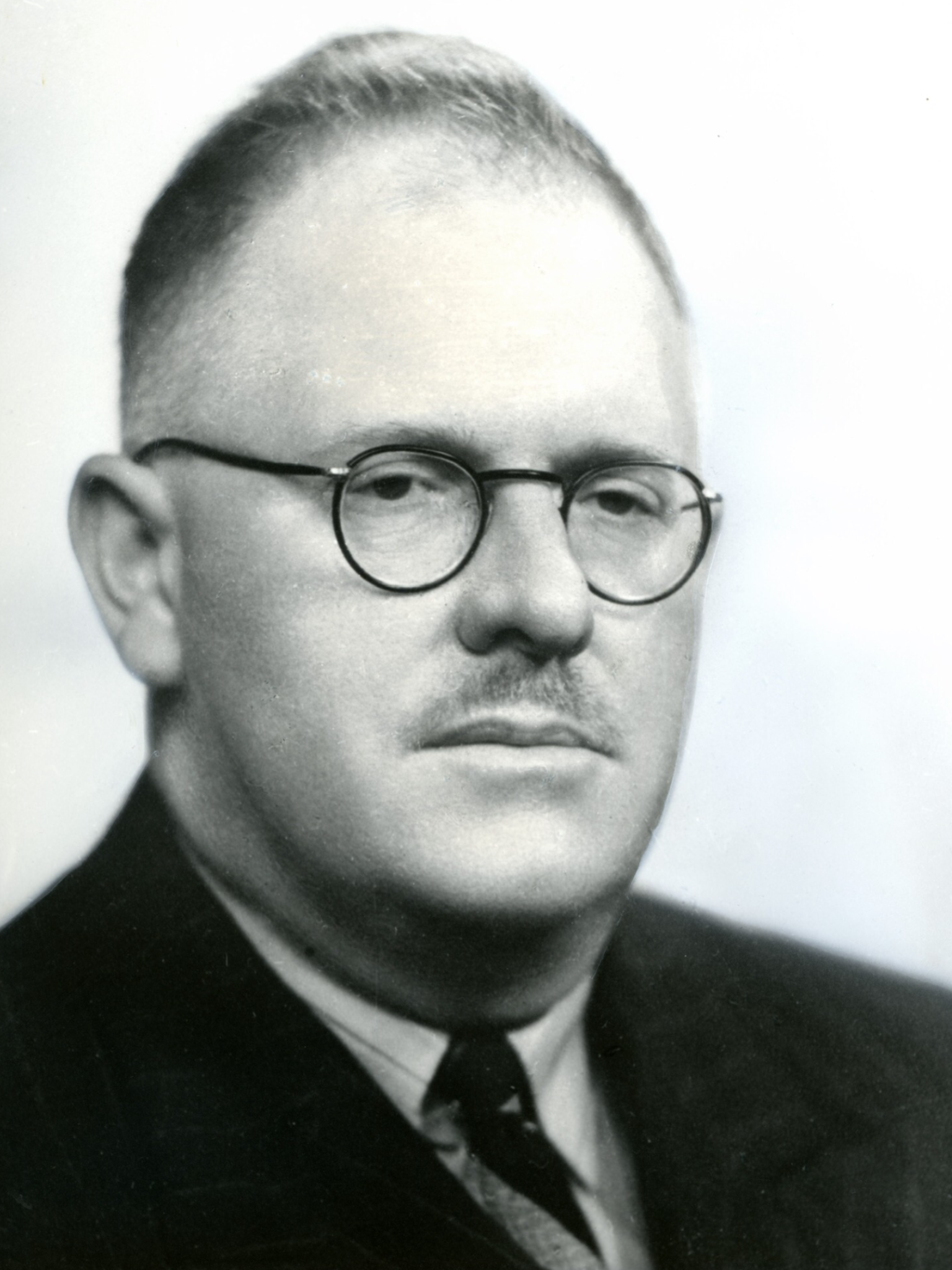
Mayor of Mosman George Keith Cowlishaw

Mayor of Willougby Lance Bavin

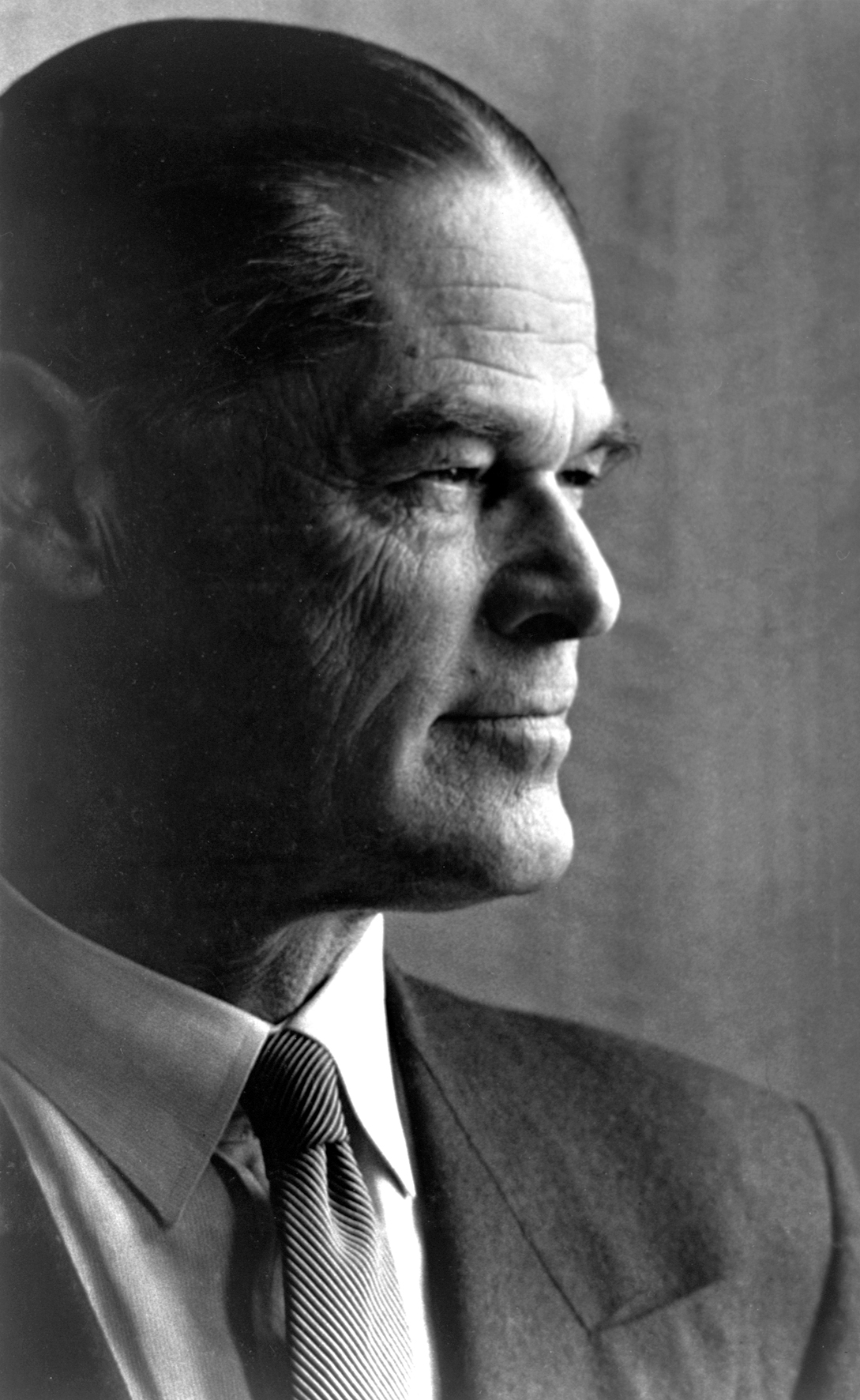
Chairman CSRIO Sir Ian Clunies Ross CMG

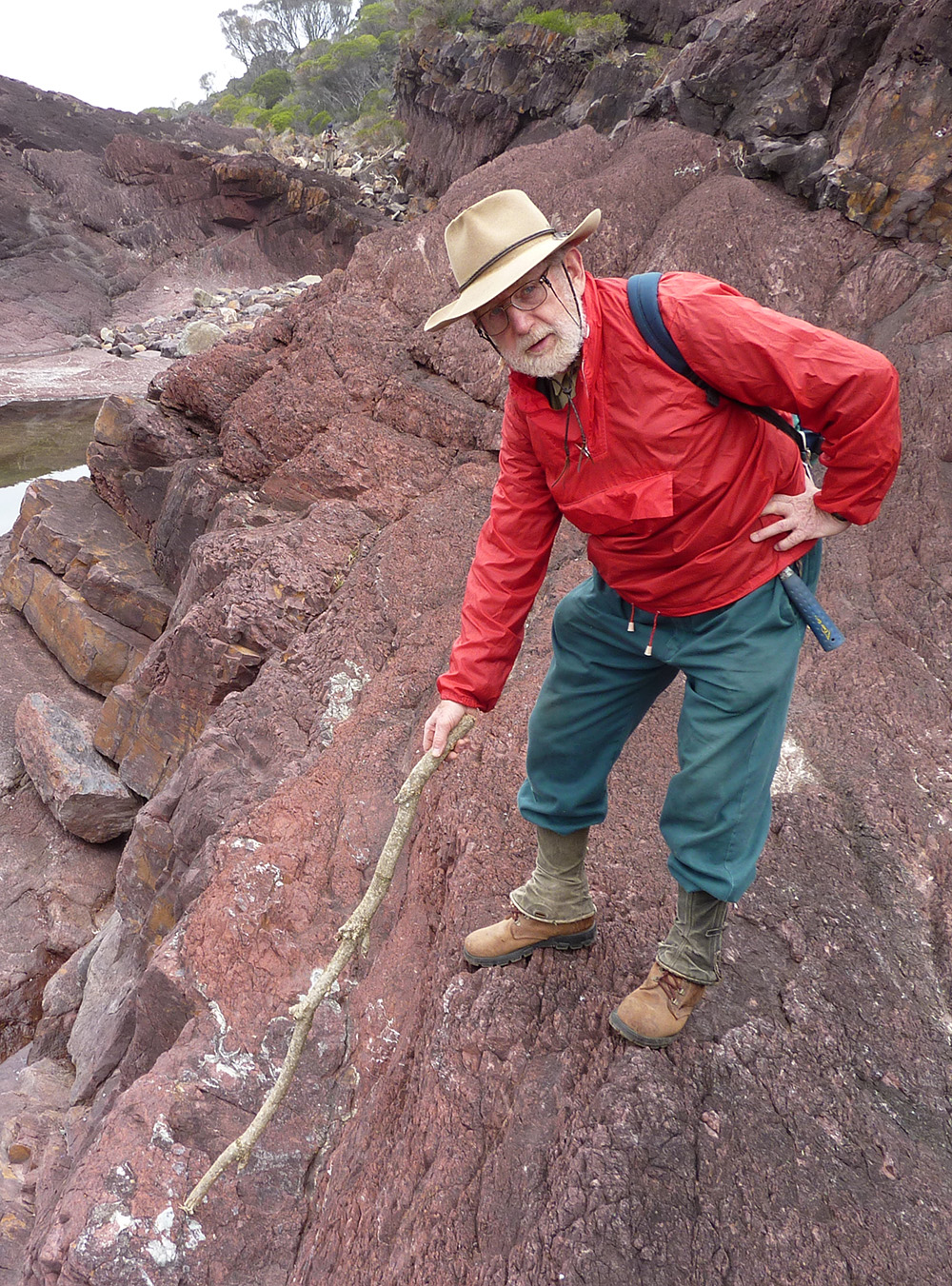
Geologist and Clarke Medalist Dr Keith Crook

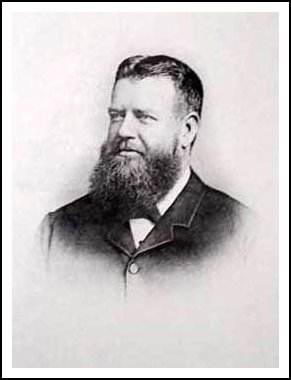
Founding president RAHS Dr Andrew Houison

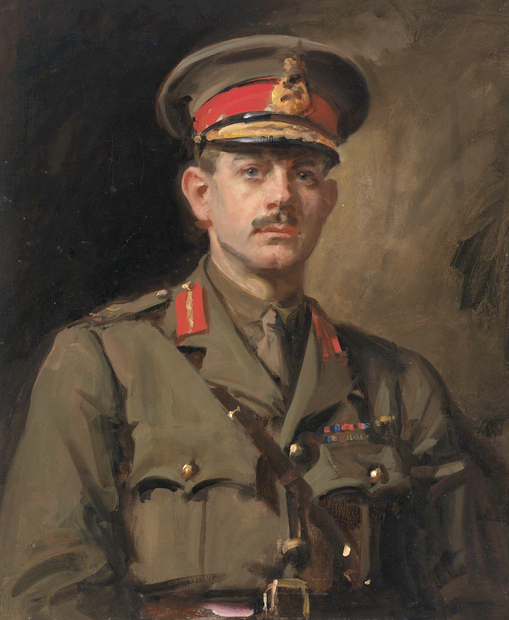
Major General Sir Iven Mackay KBE CMG DSO VD

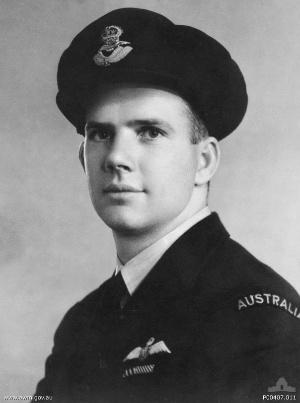
Squadron Leader Adrian Goldsmith DFC DFM

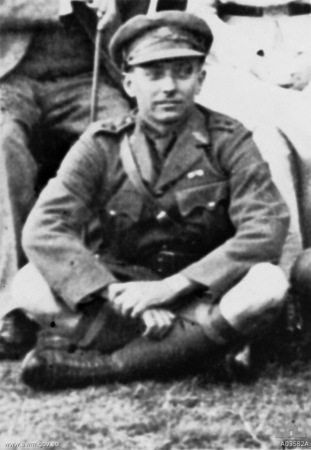
Captain Oliver Woddward CMG MC

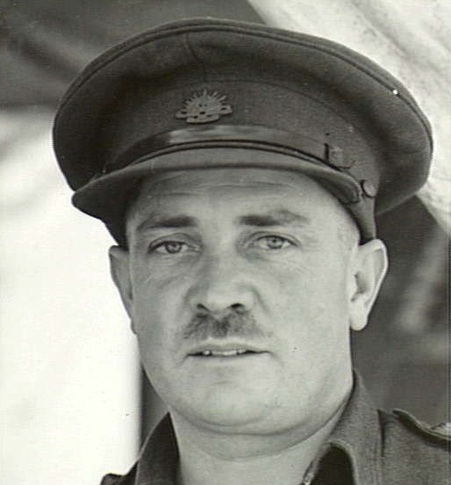
Lieutenant Colonel Bert Locke OBE

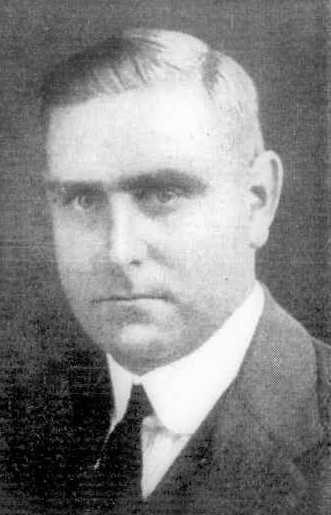
Chairman of AMP Sir Cecil Hoskins

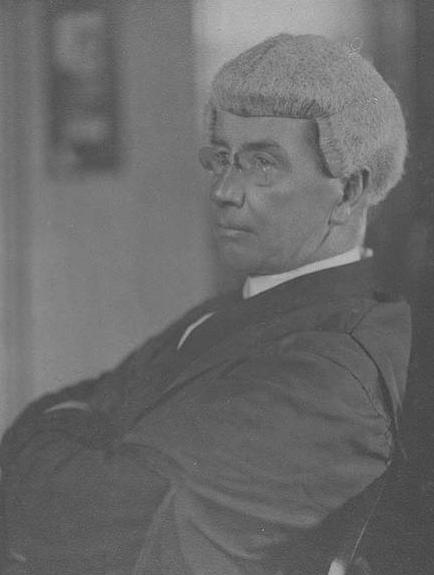
District Court Judge Herbert Curlewis

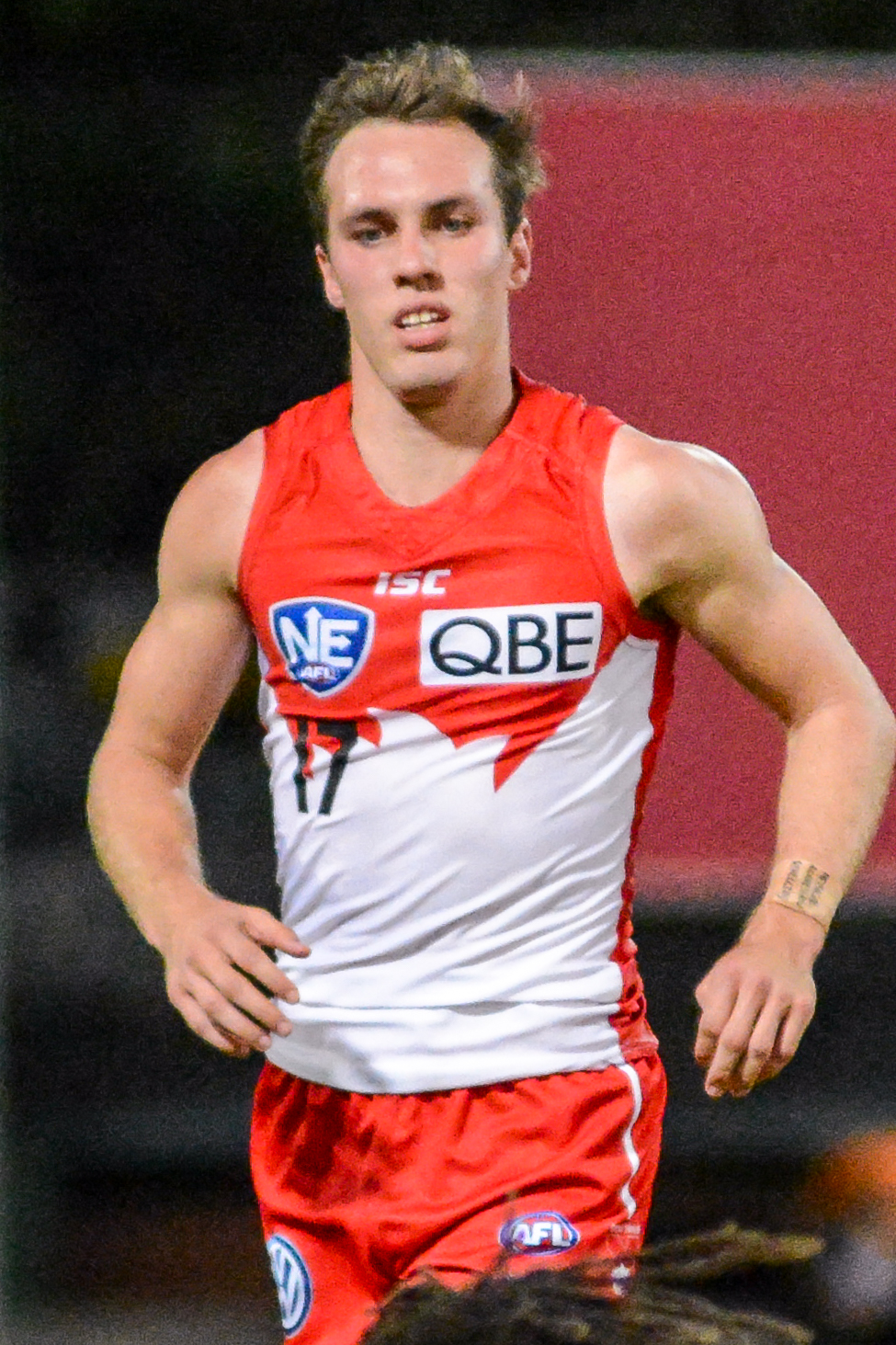
Australian Rules player Jack Hiscox

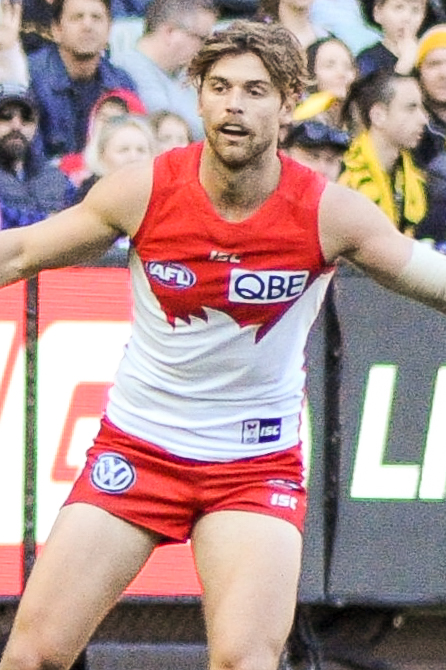
Australian Rules player Dane Rampe

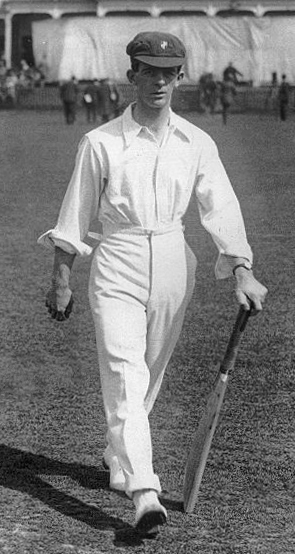
Cricket and rugby International Johnny Taylor

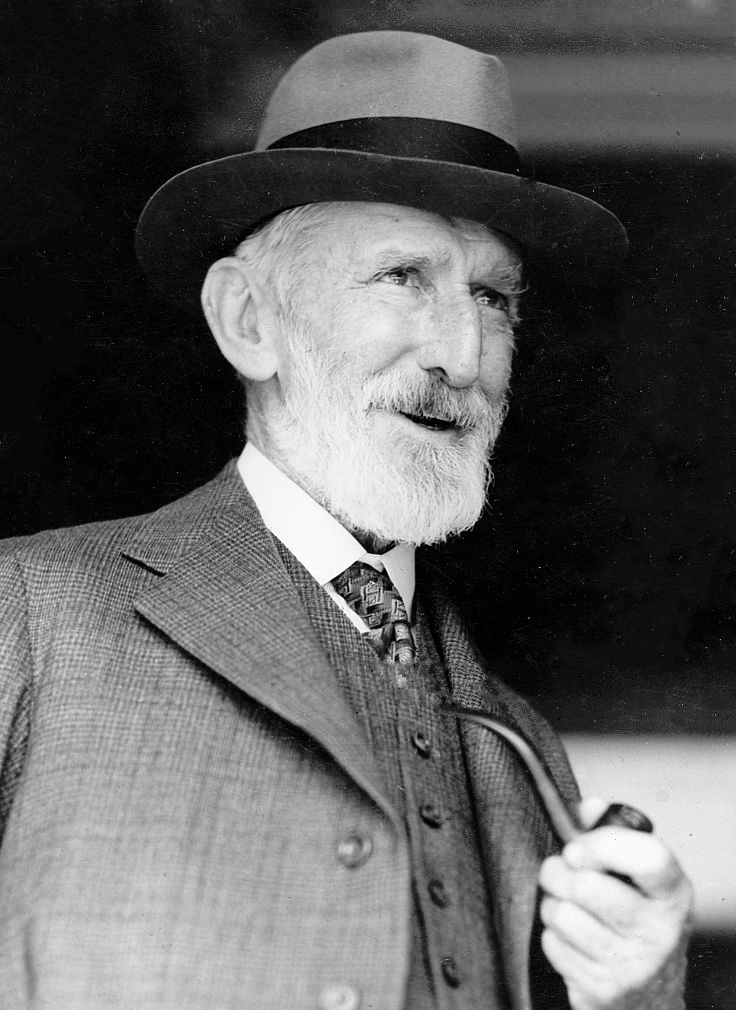
Cricket International Tom Garrett

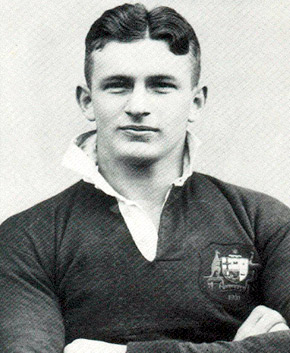
Wallaby Captain and Coach Dave Cowper

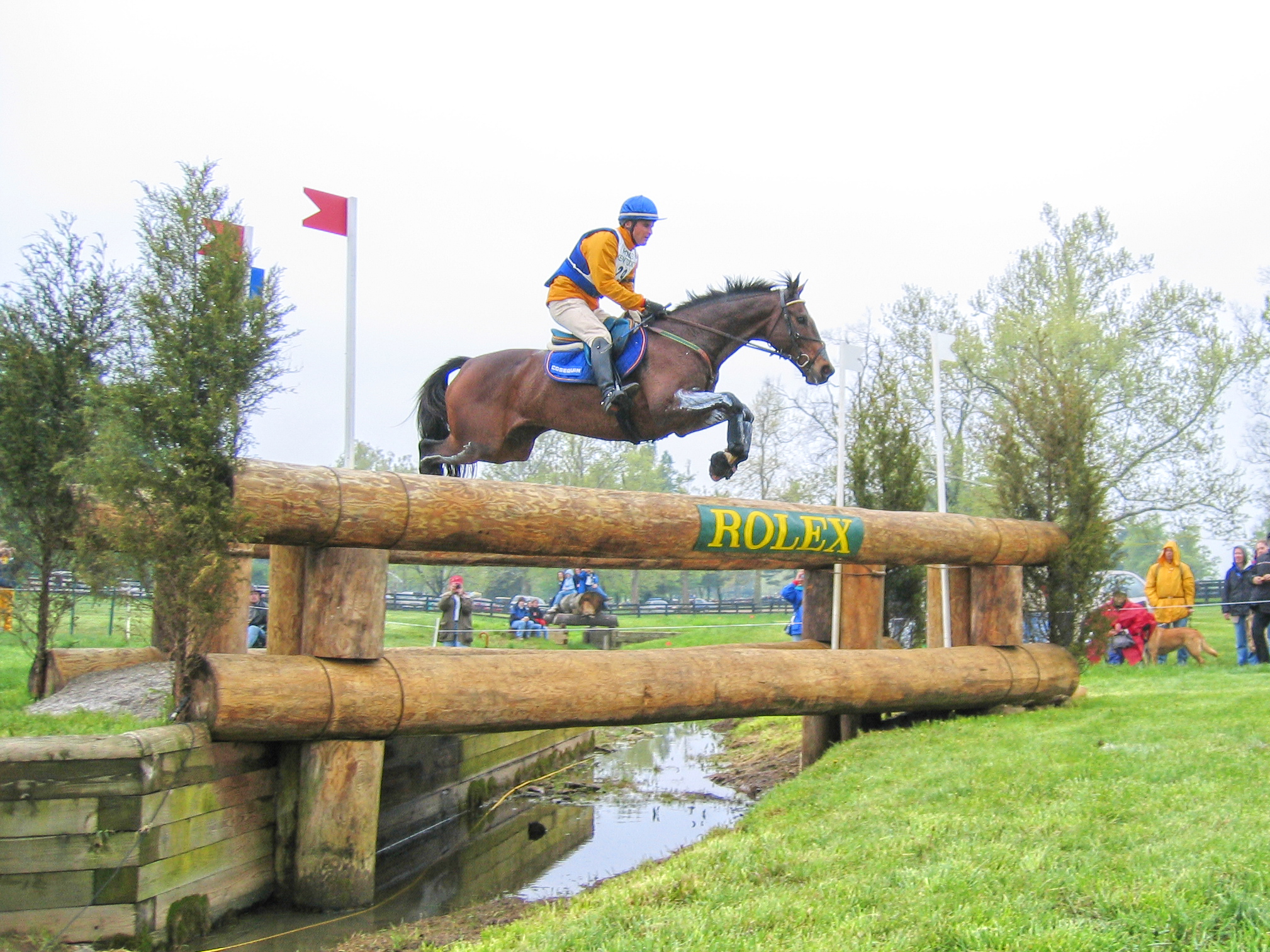
Olympic equestrian gold medallist Phillip Dutton

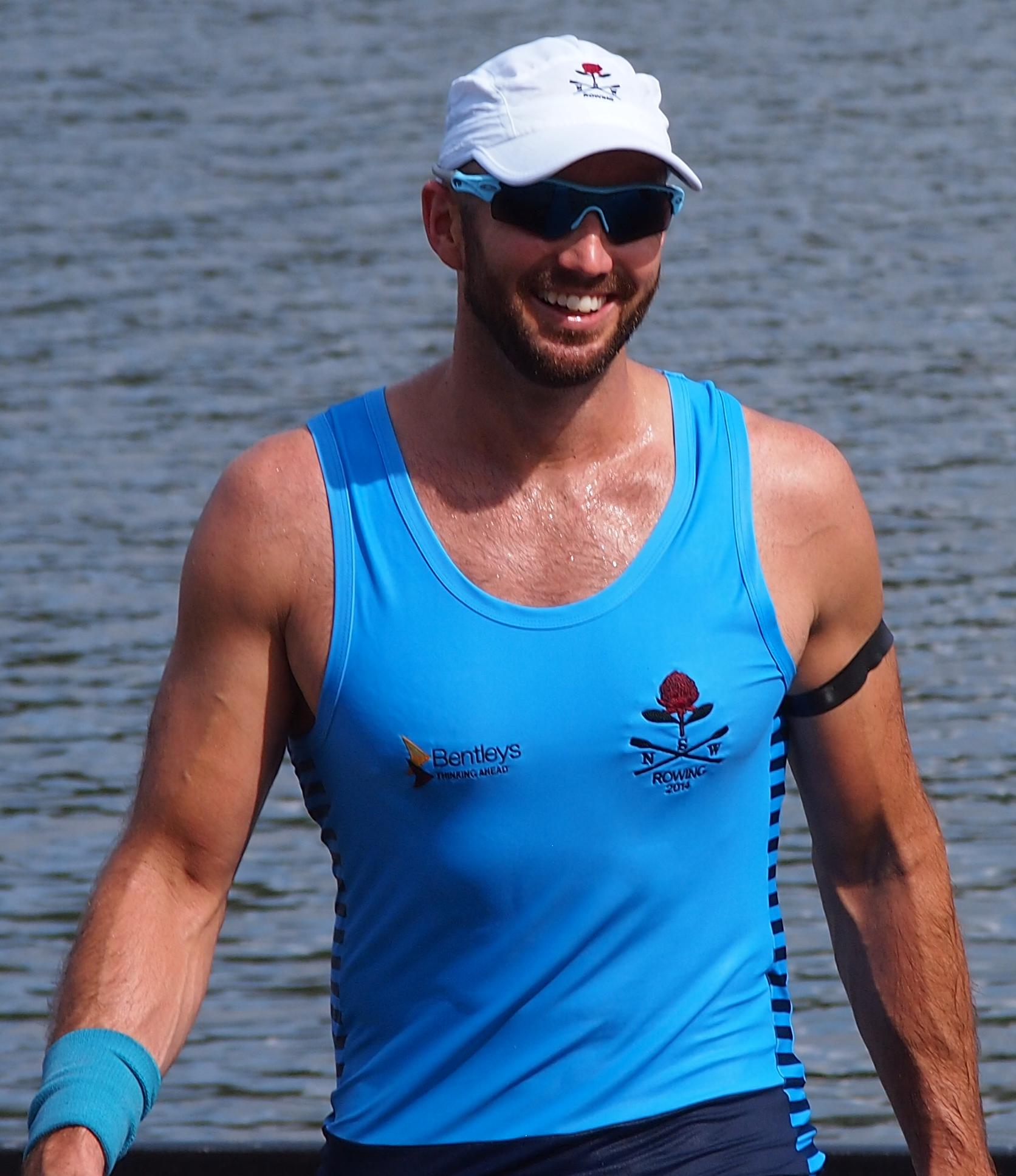
Olympic rowing silver medallist James Chapman

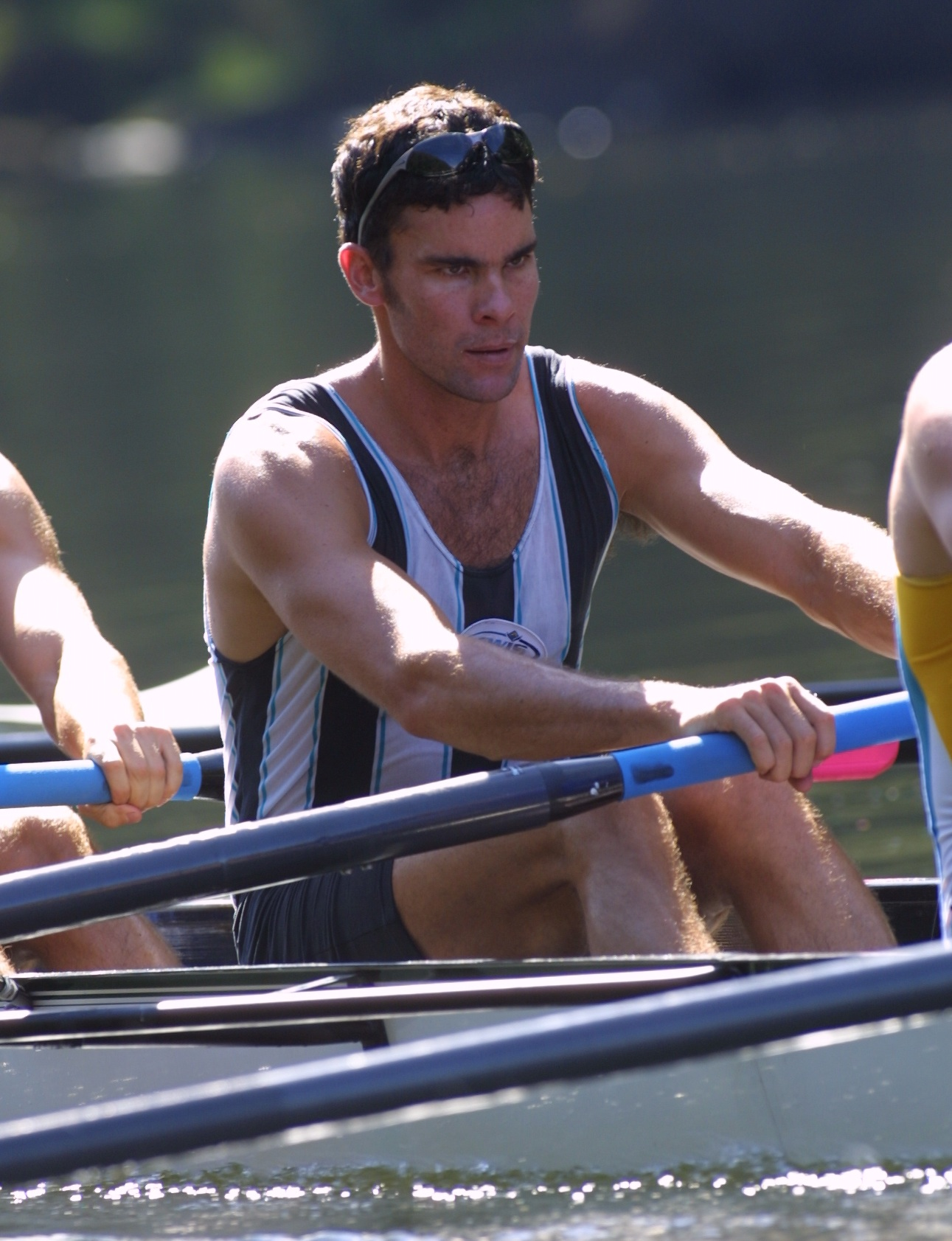
Olympic rowing bronze medallist Geoff Stewart

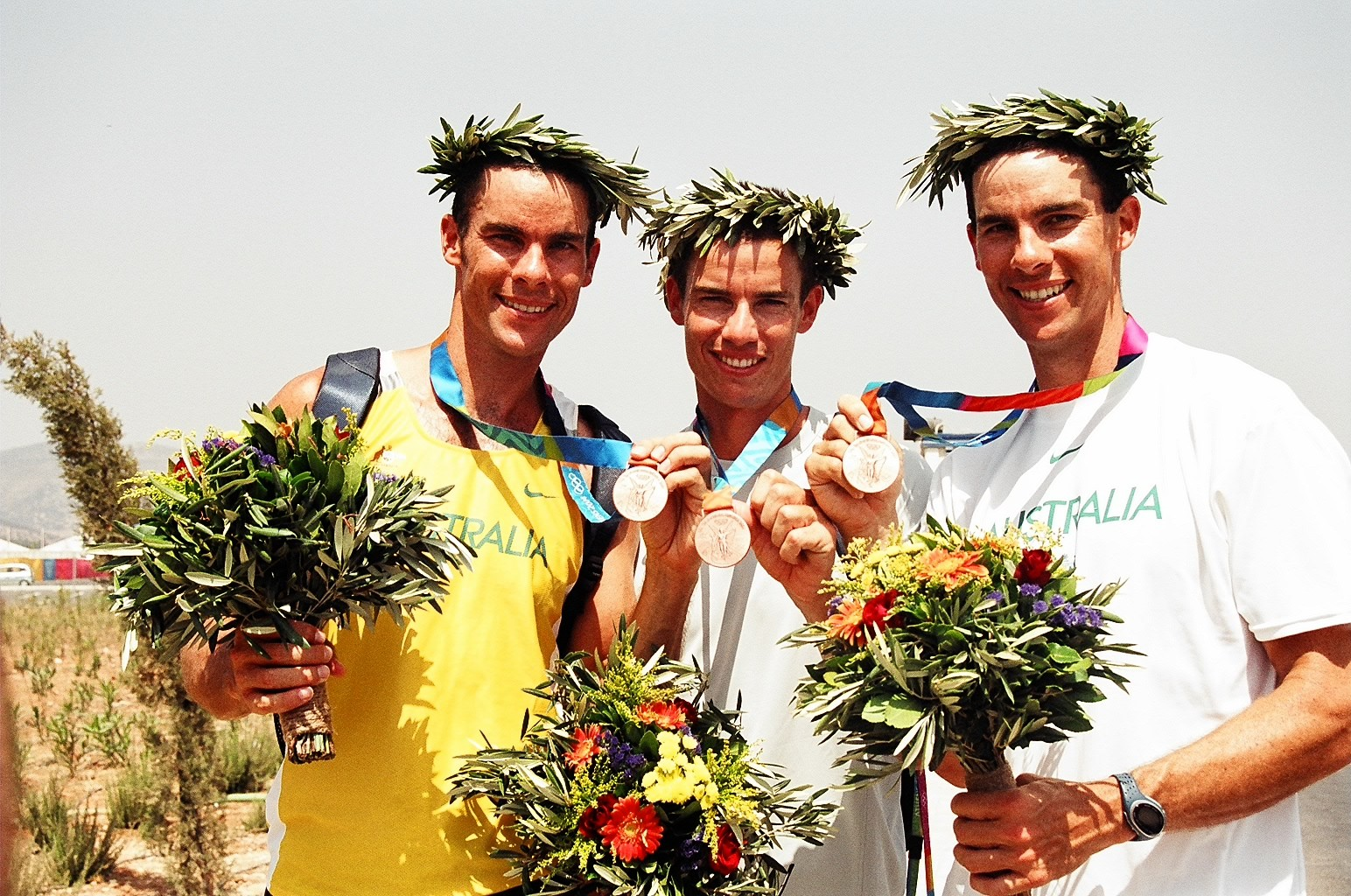
Stewart Brothers Bronze medallists Athens Olympics

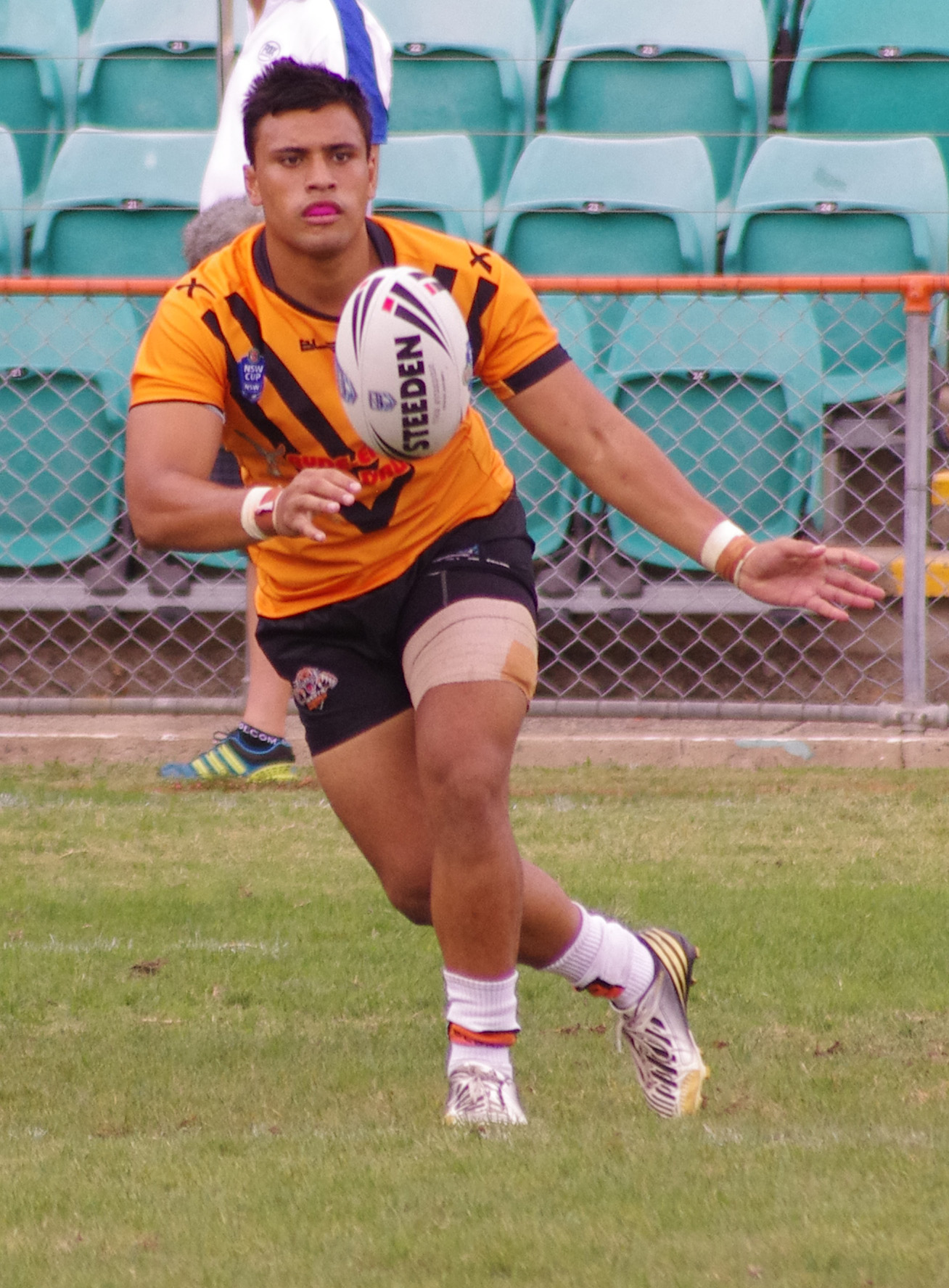
Rugby league player Joel Luani

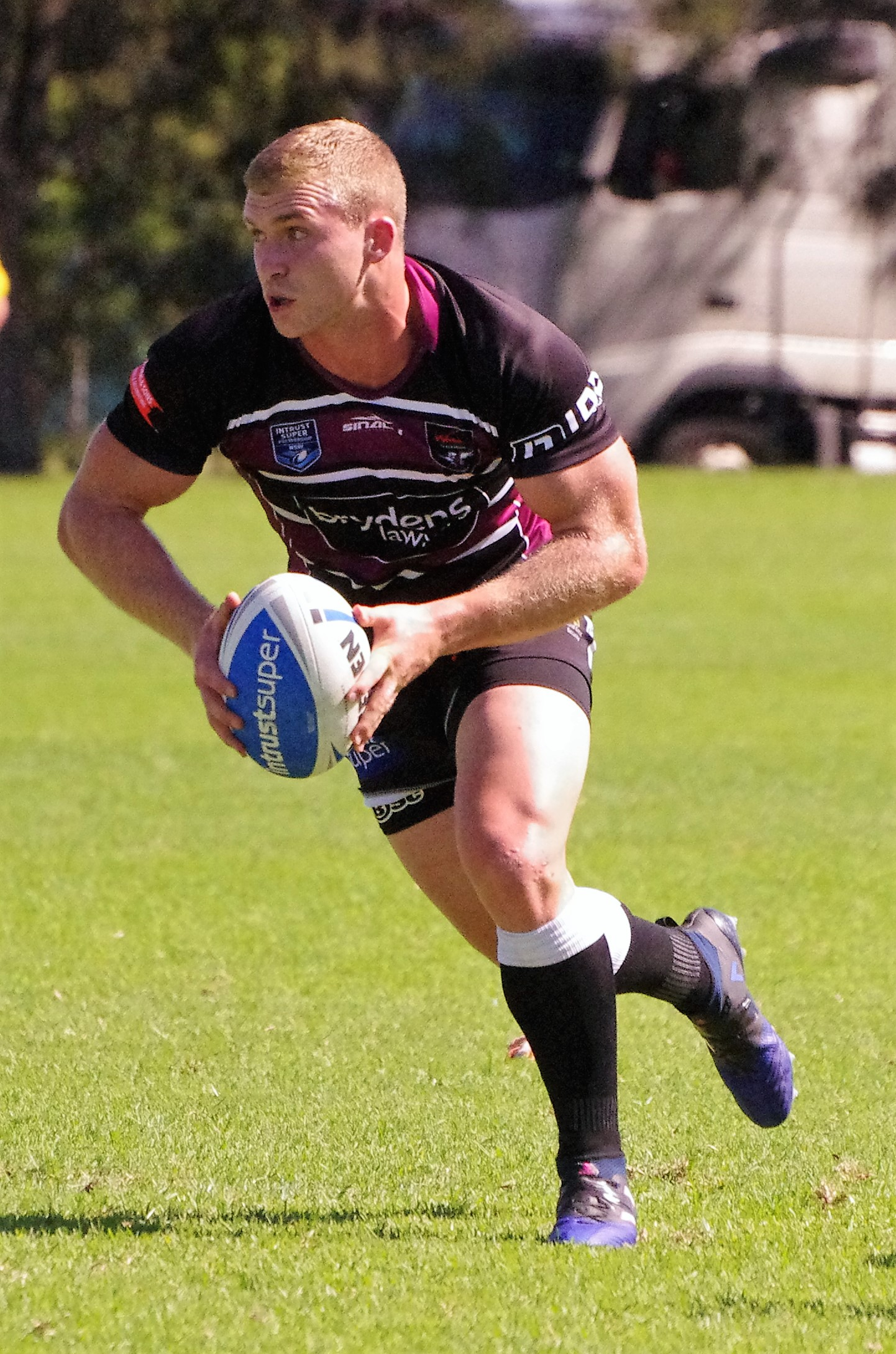
Rugby league player Joey Lussick

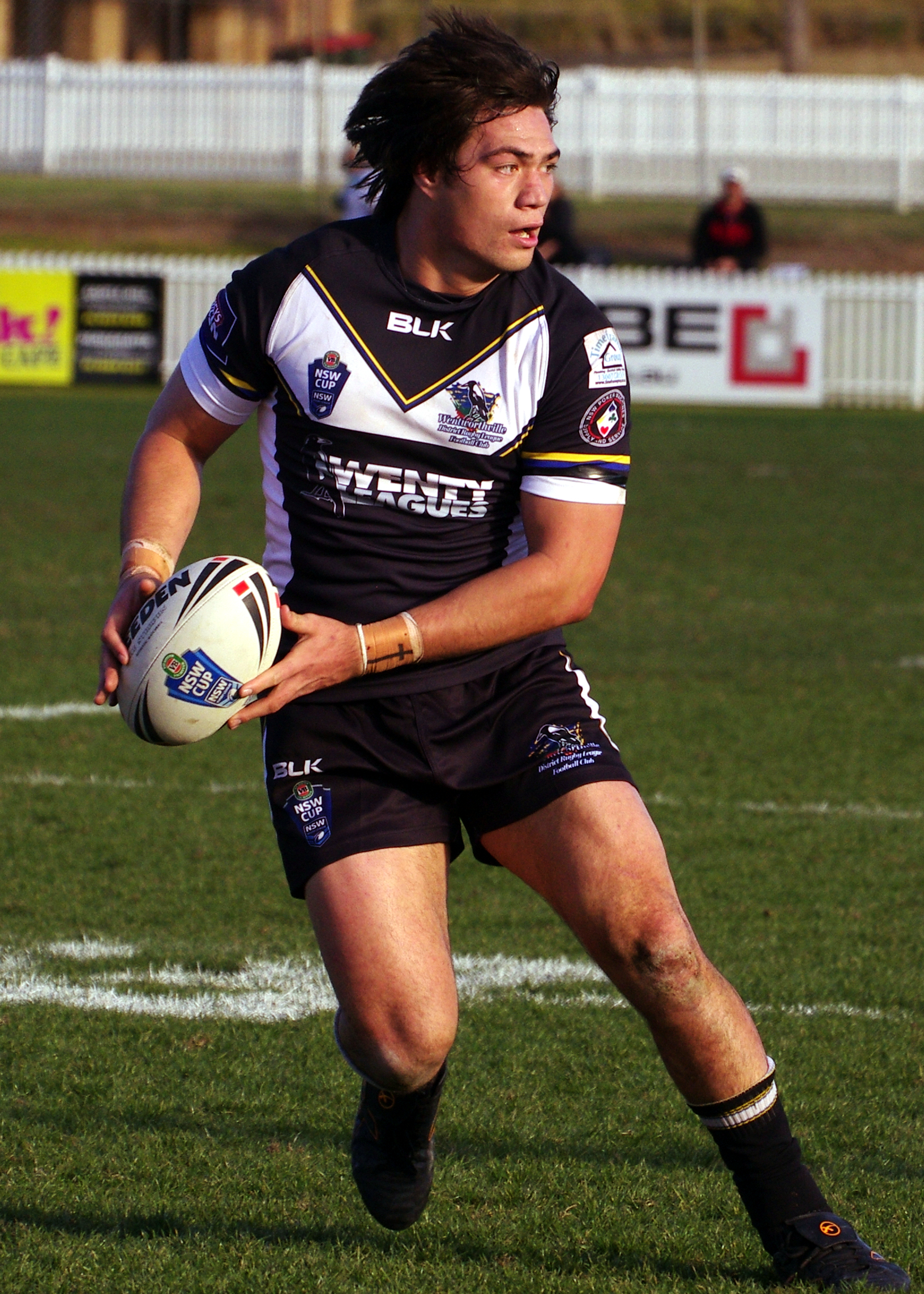
Rugby league player Tepai Moeroa

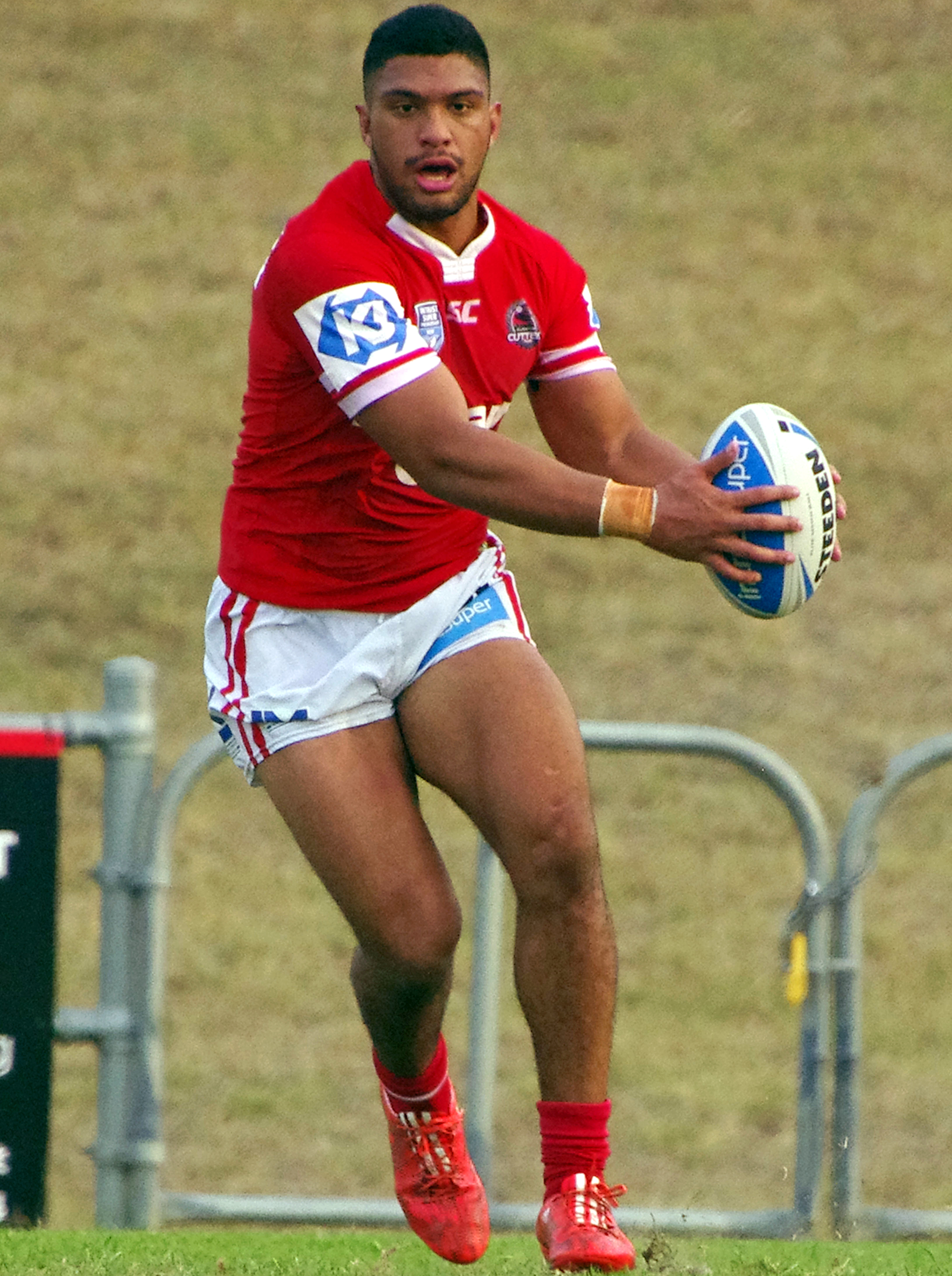
Rugby league player Taane Milne

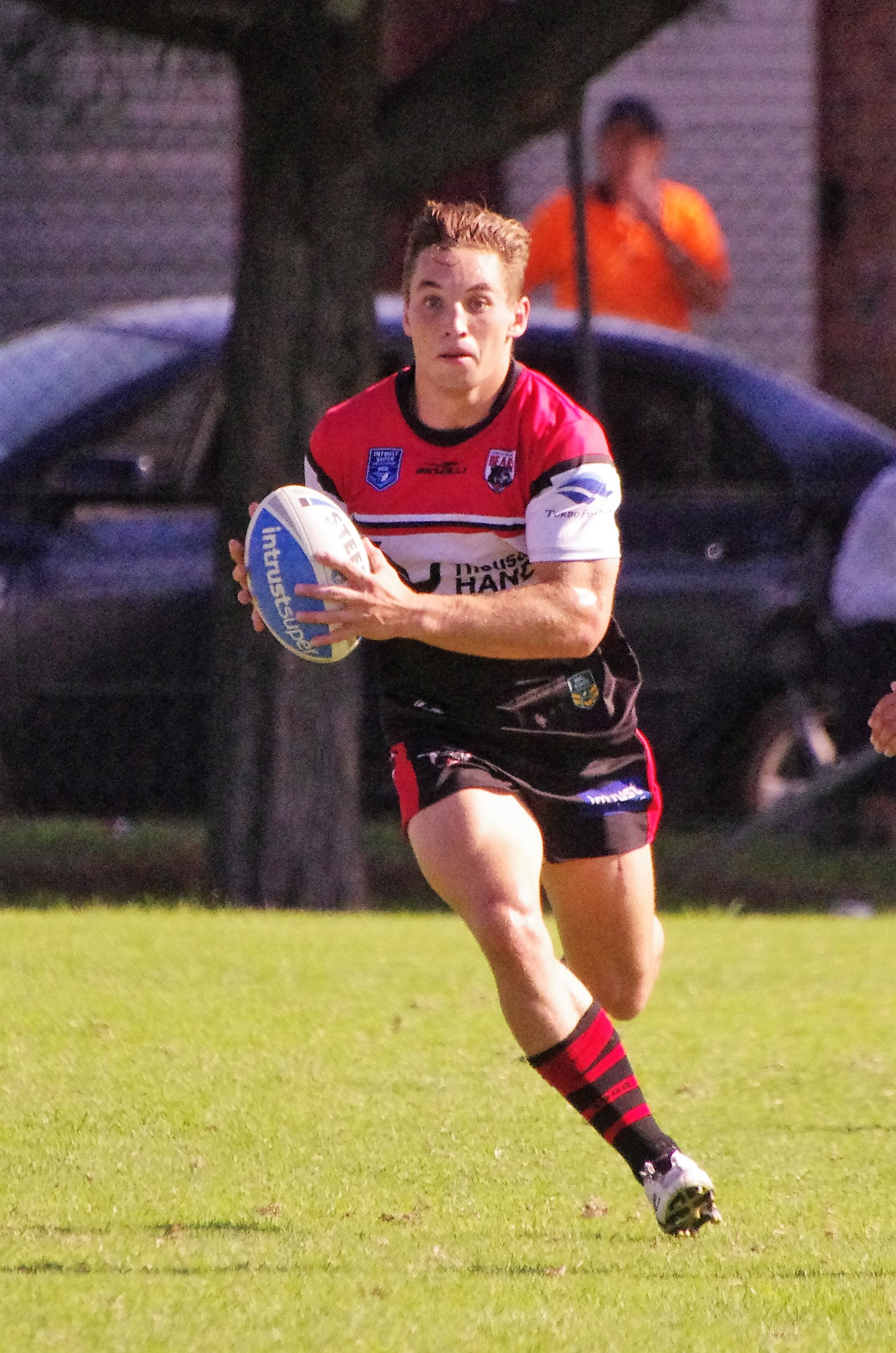
Rugby league player Cameron Murray

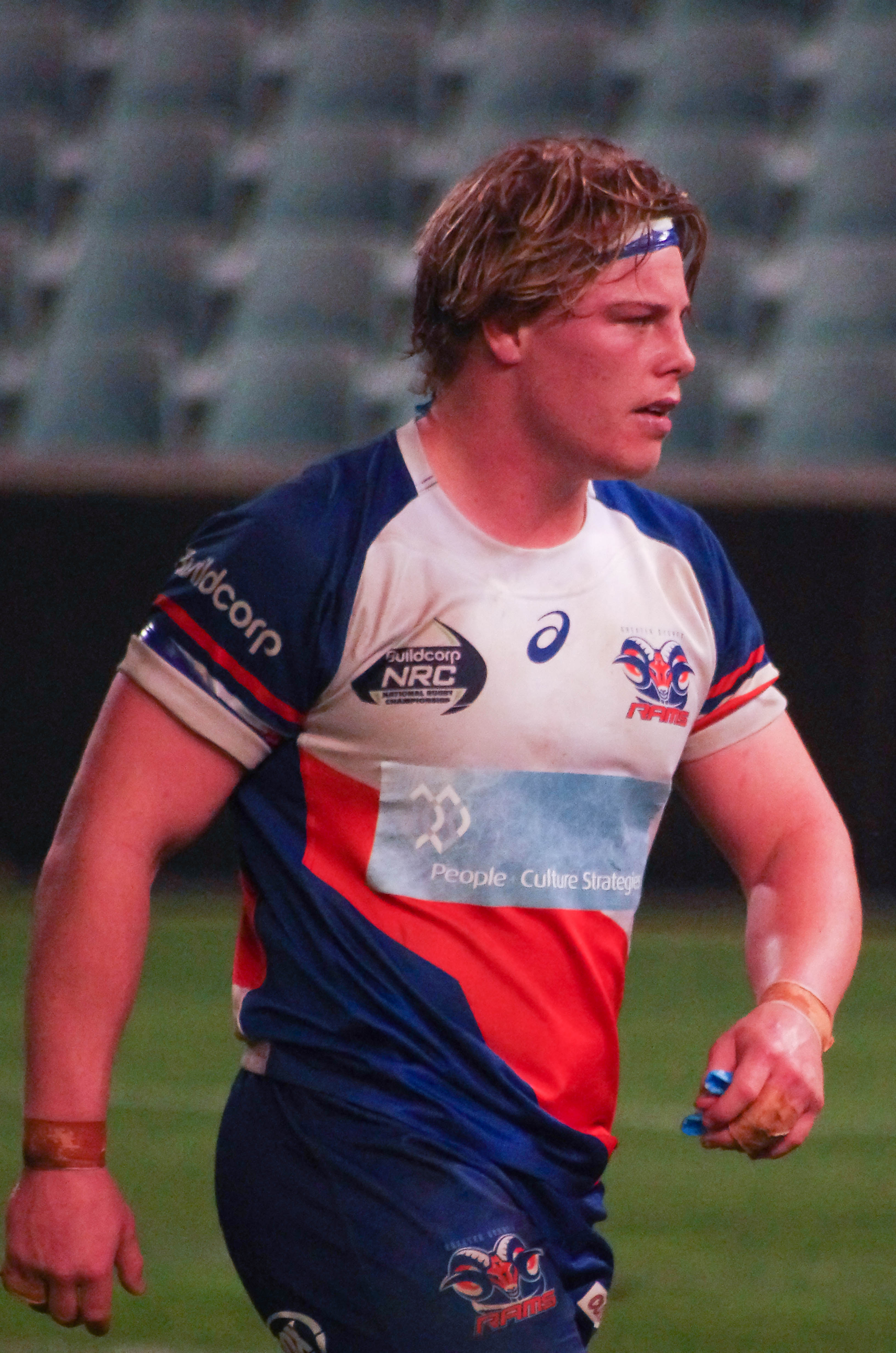
Rugby union player Hugh Roach

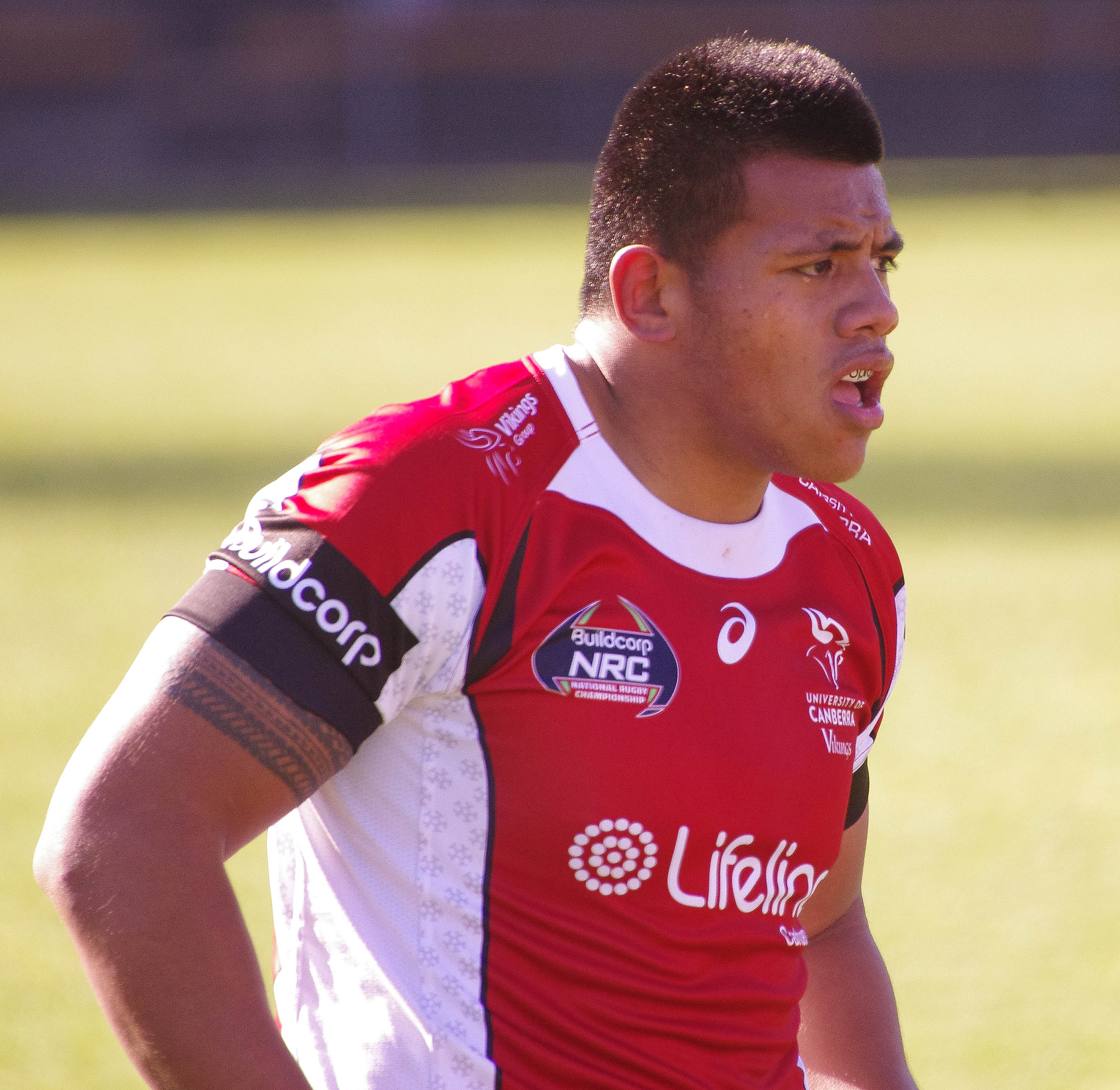
Rugby union player Allan Alaalatoa

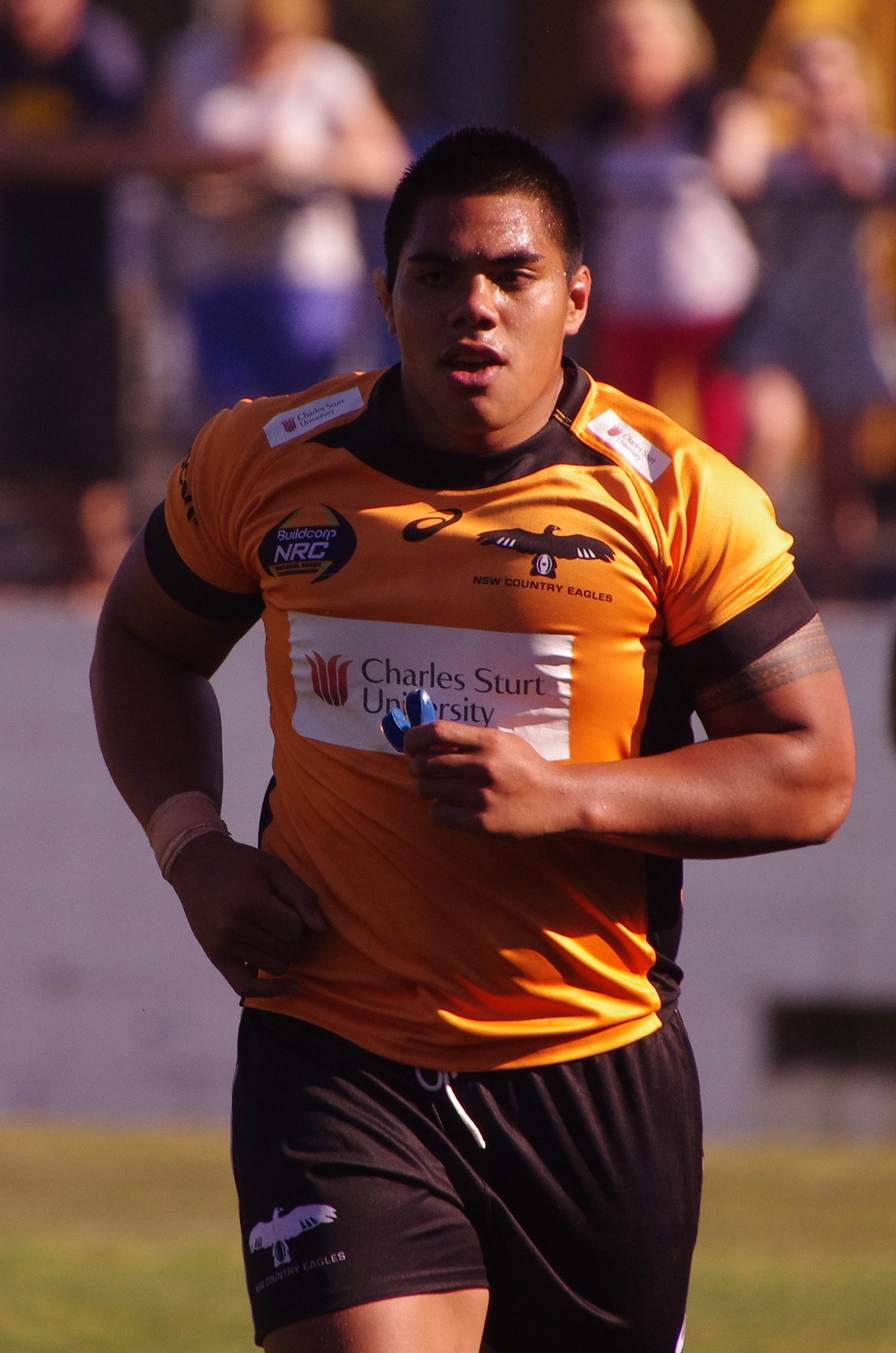
Rugby union player Michael Alaalatoa

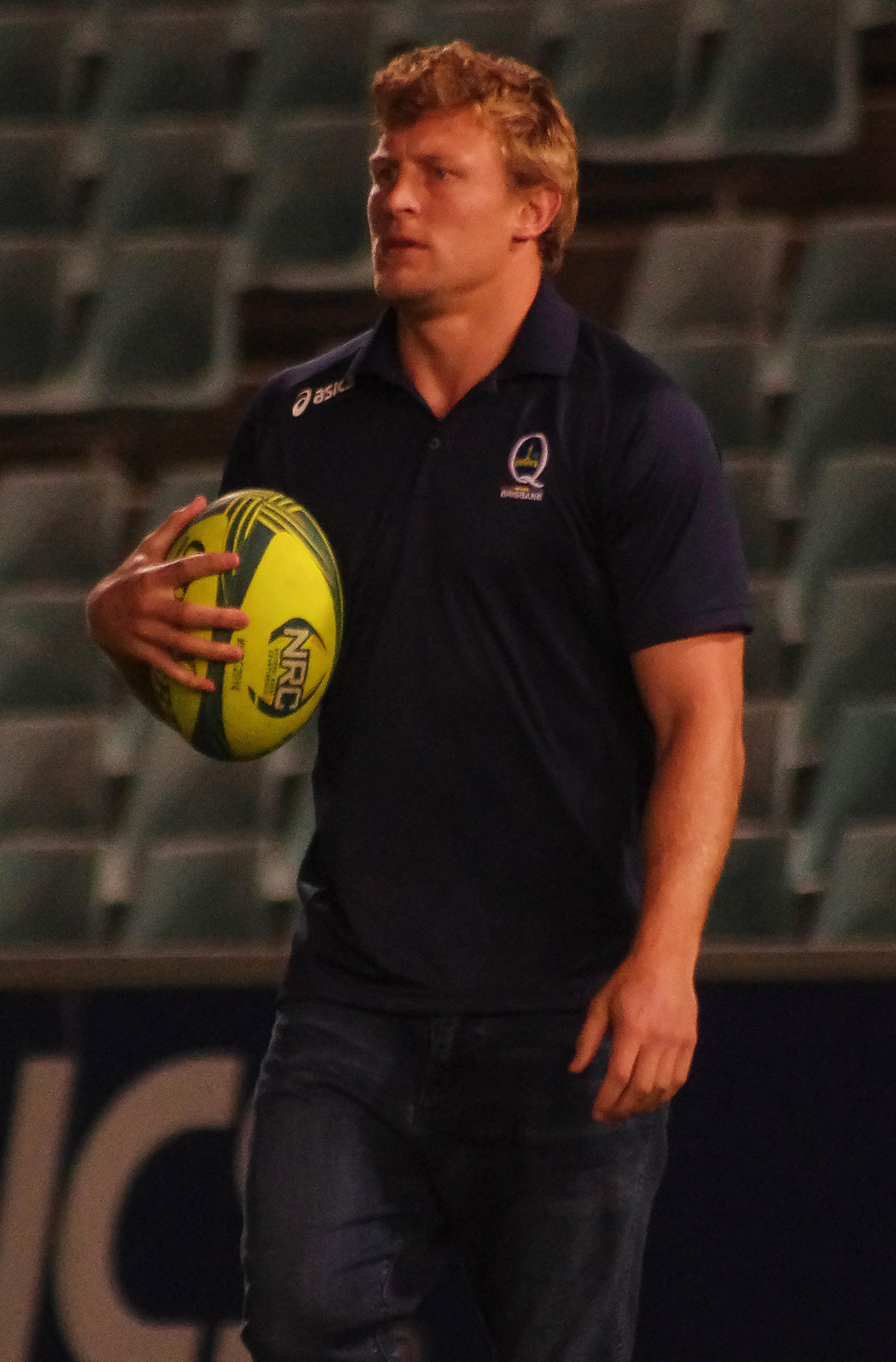
Rugby union player Lachie Turner

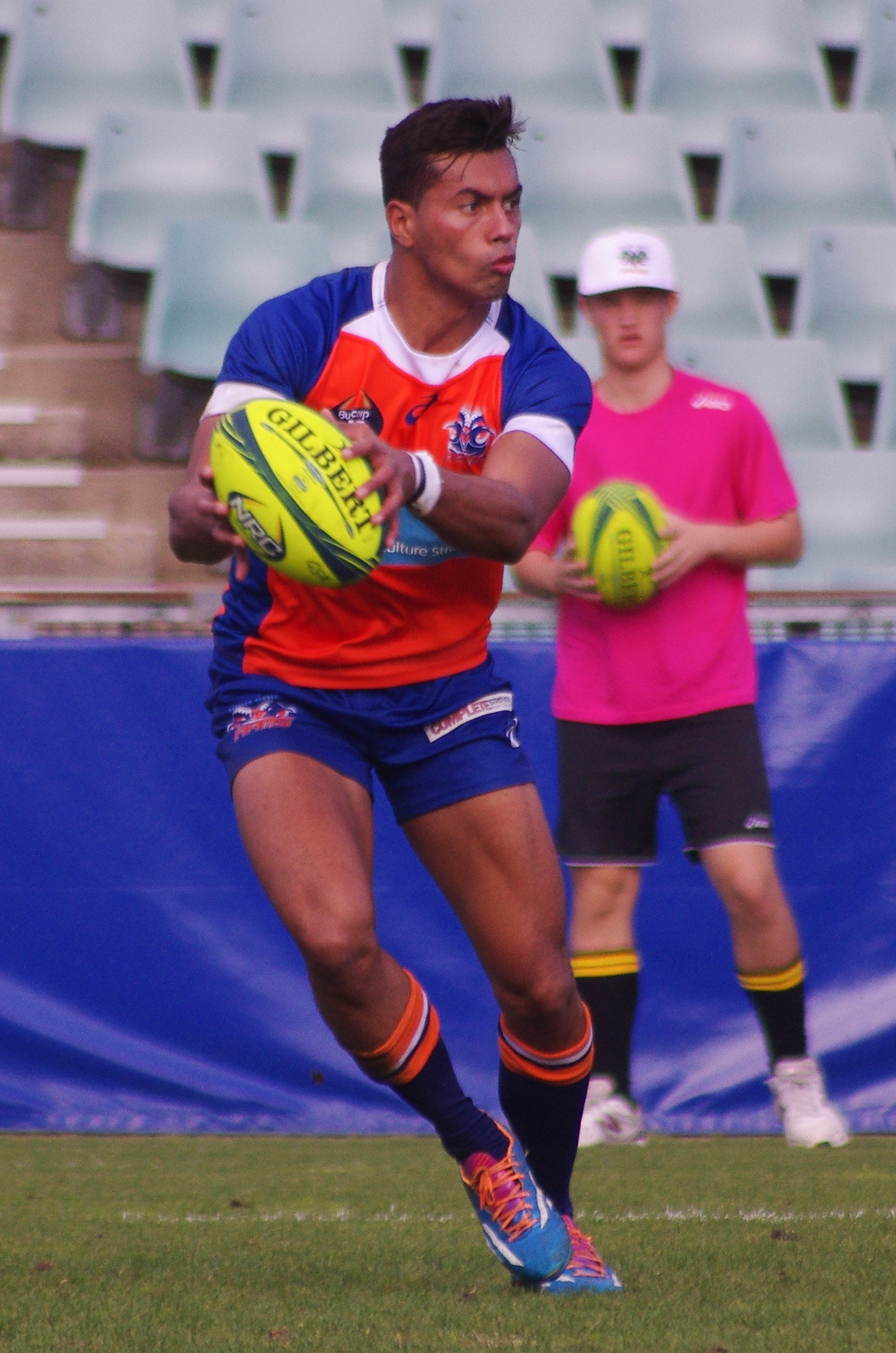
Rugby union player Ben Volavola

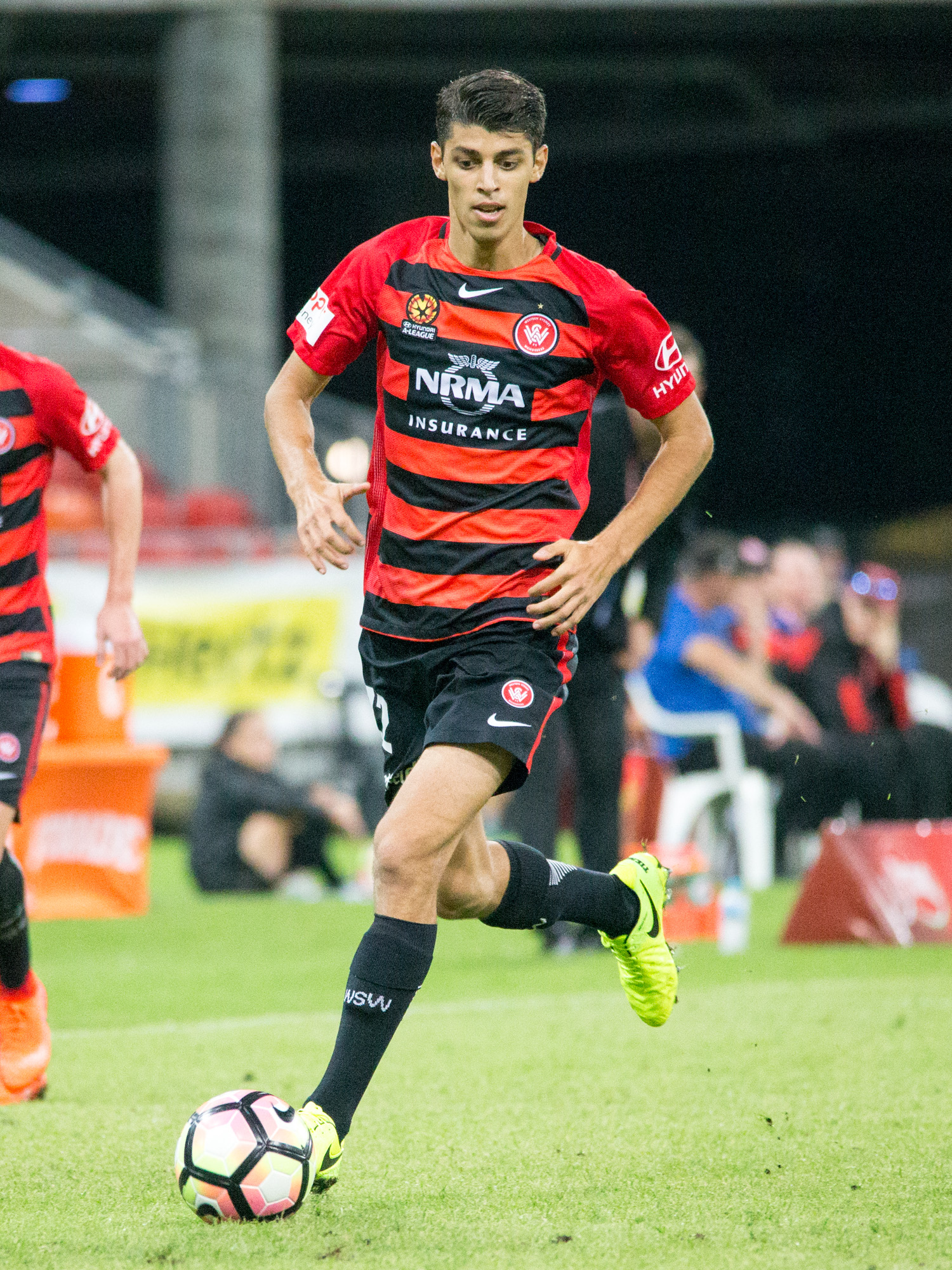
Footballer Jonathan Aspro

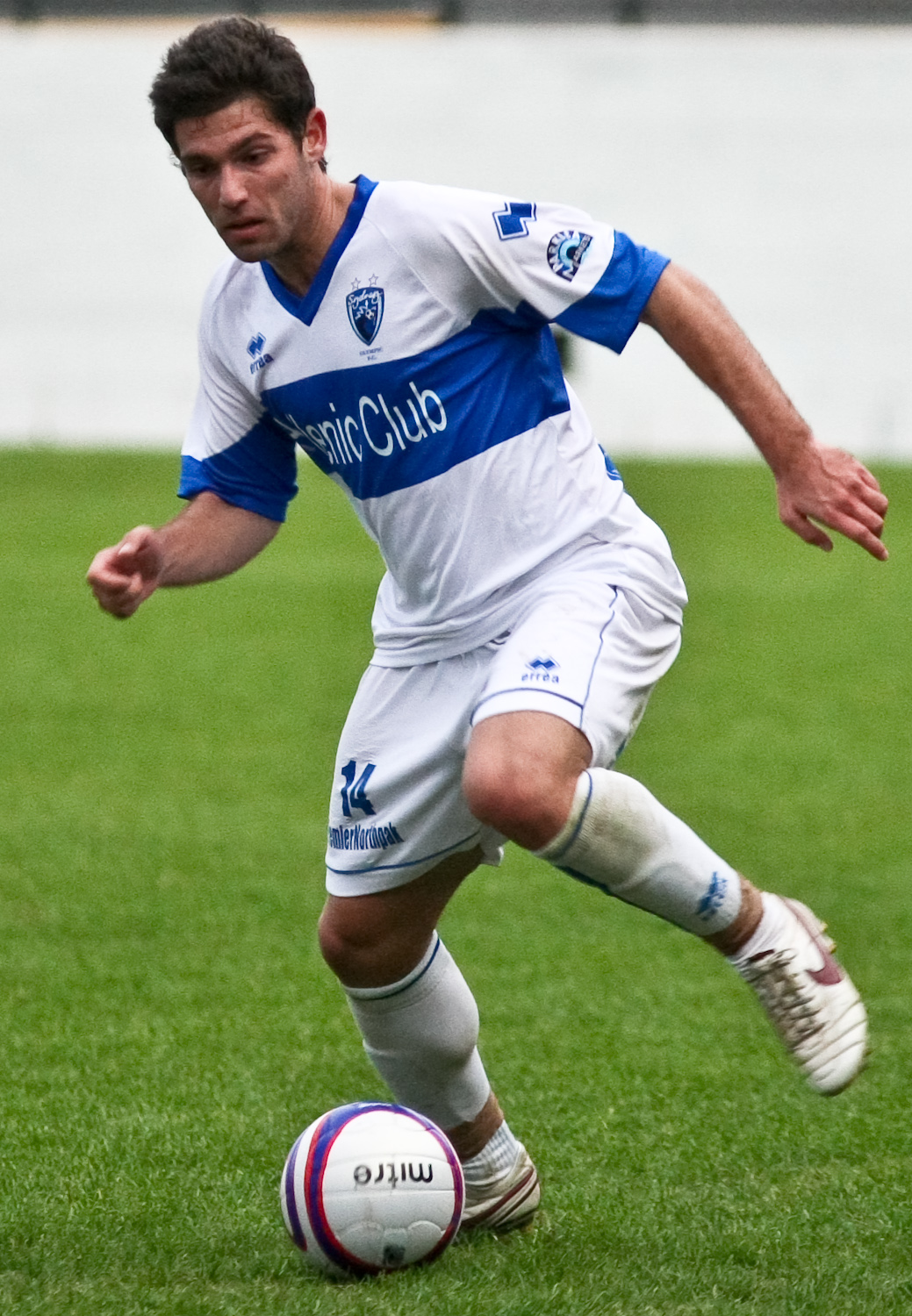
Footballer Chris Triantis

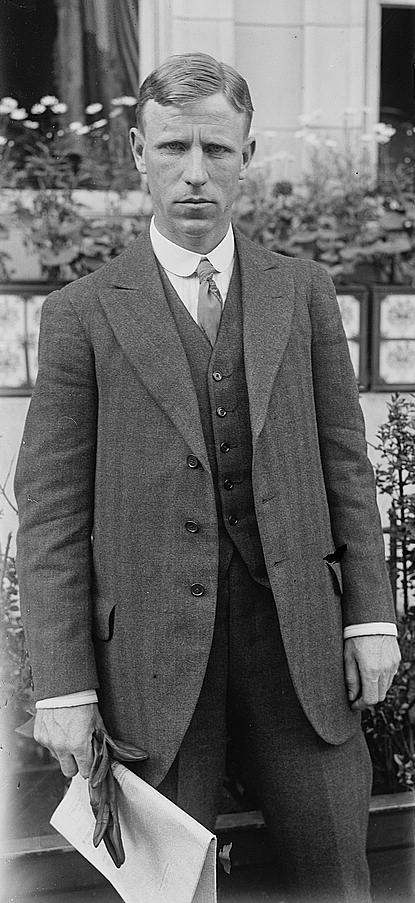
Davis Cup Team Captain Stanley Doust

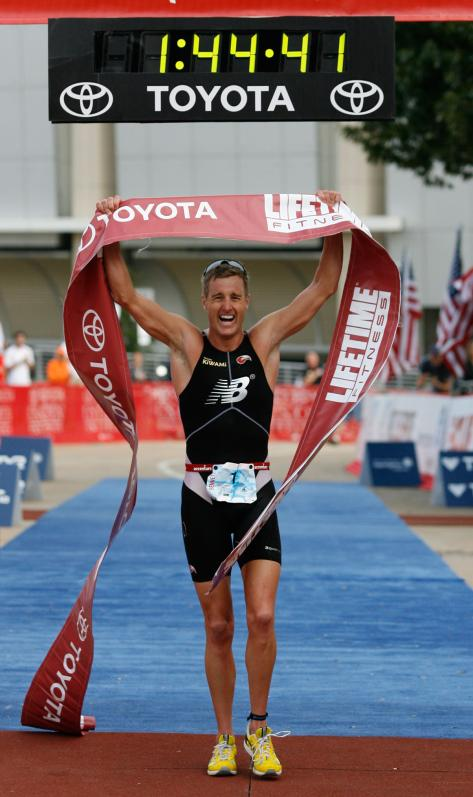
World Cup-winning Triathlete Greg Bennett

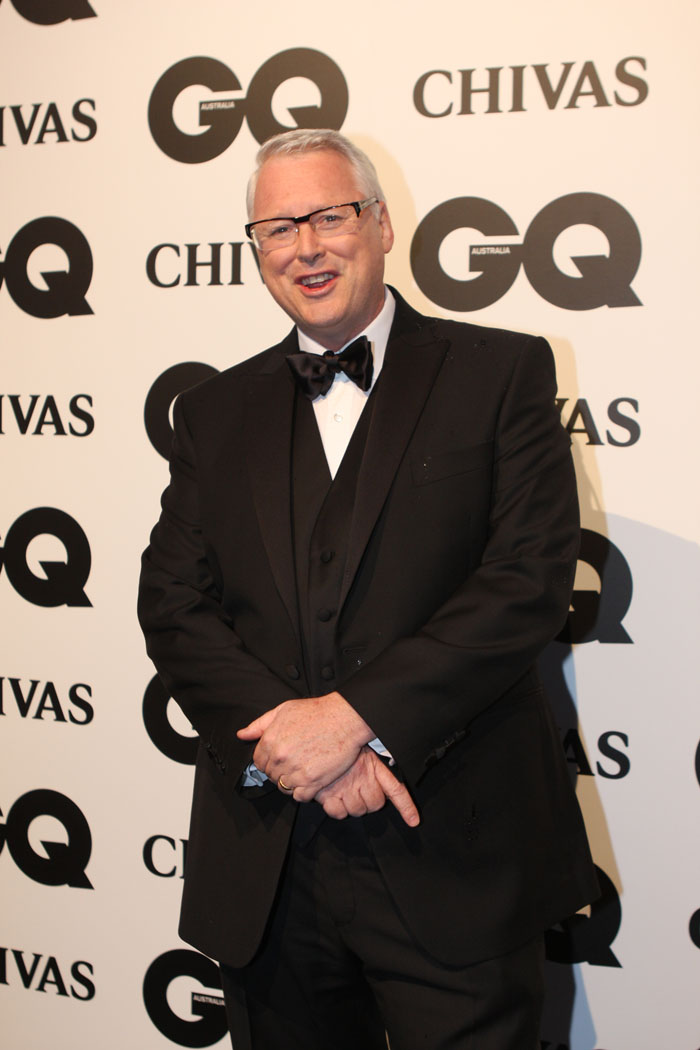
Journalist and TV presenter Tony Jones

Chef Neil Perry AM

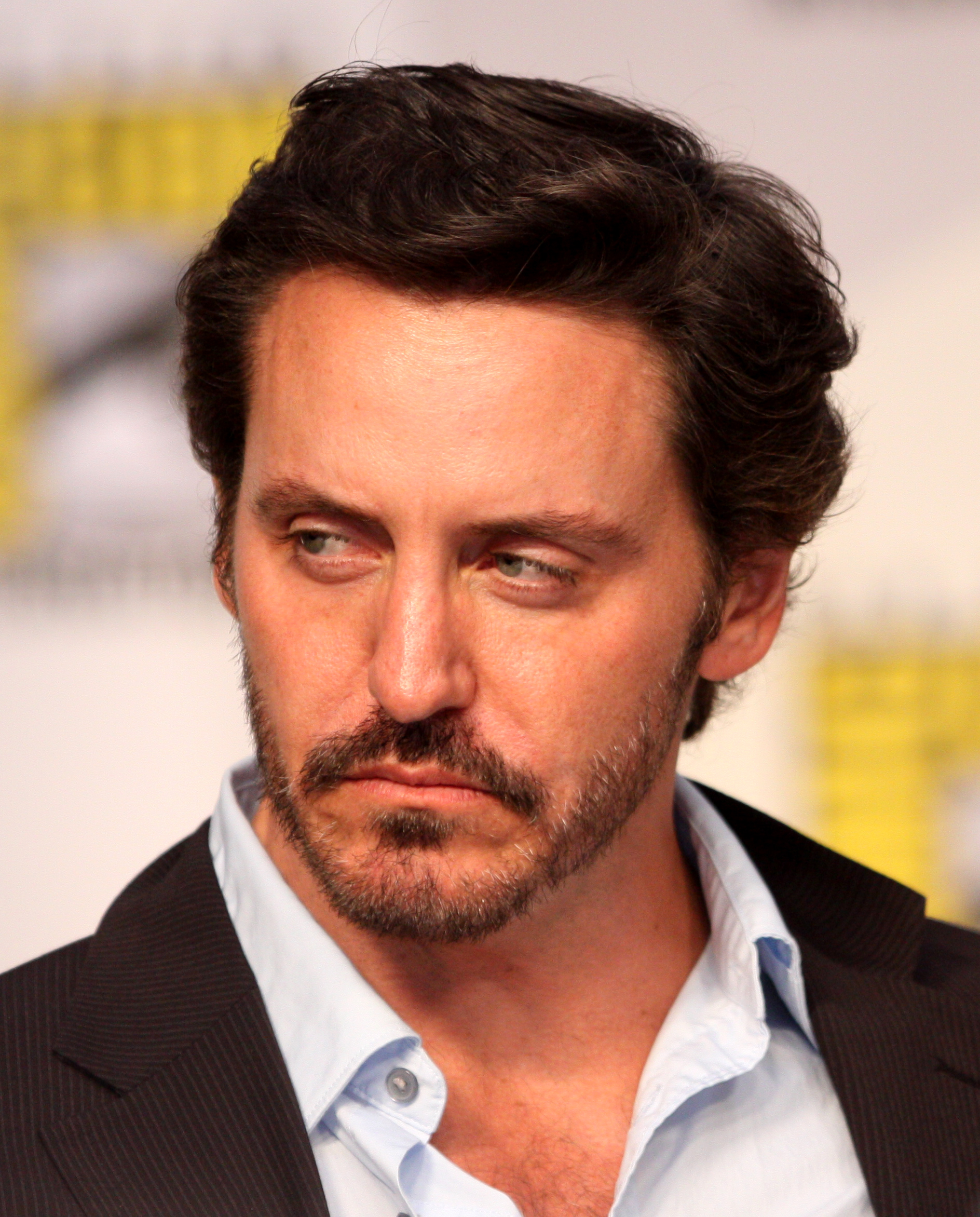
Actor Charles Mesure

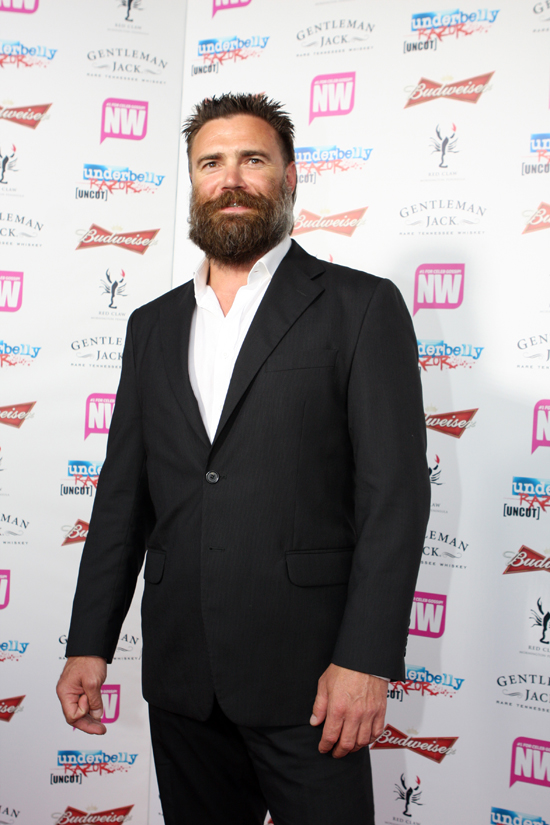
Actor Jeremy Lindsay Taylor

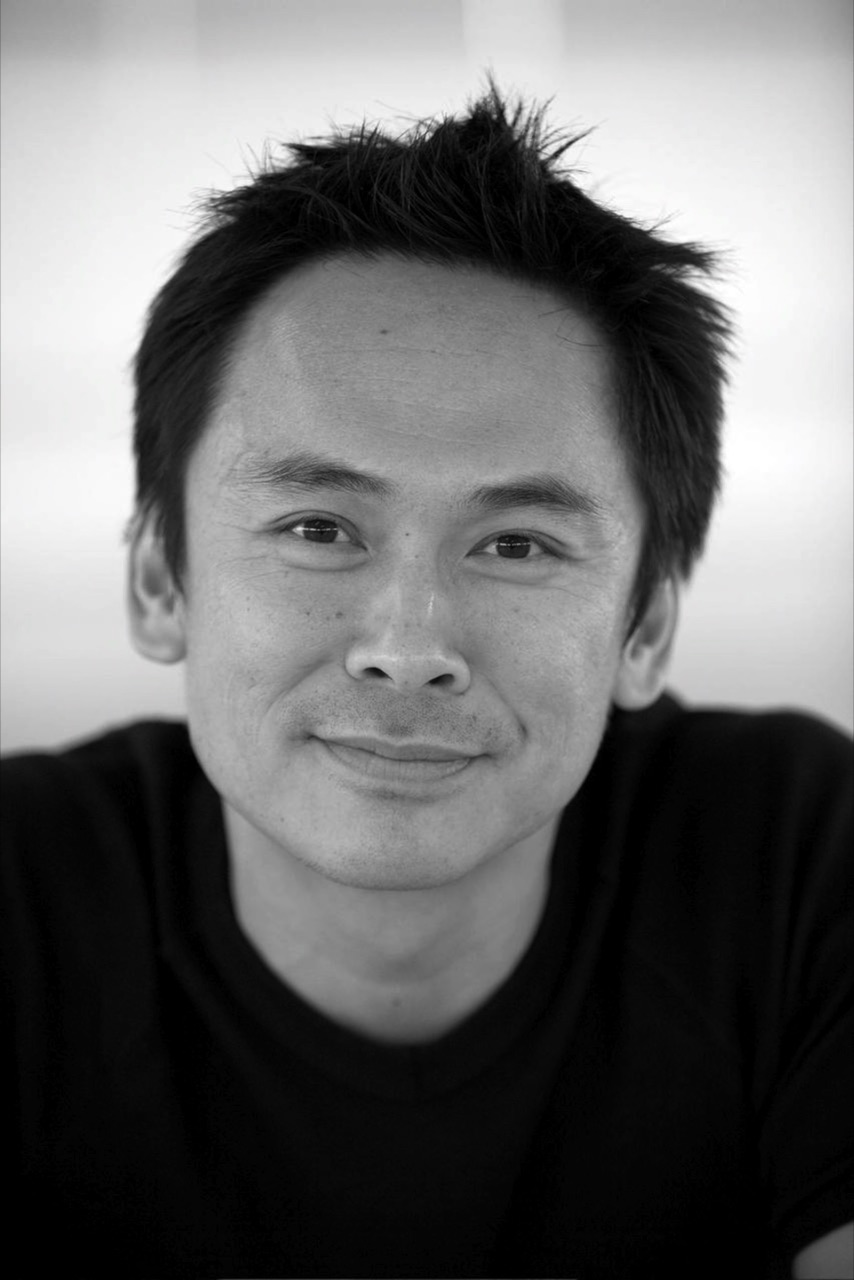
Actor and director Darren Yap

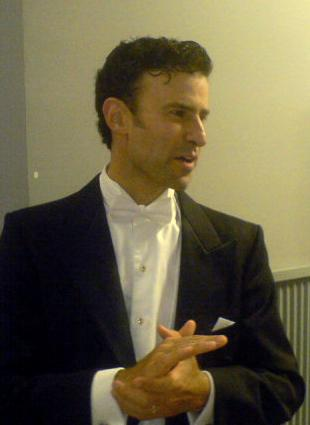
Countertenor Toby Cole

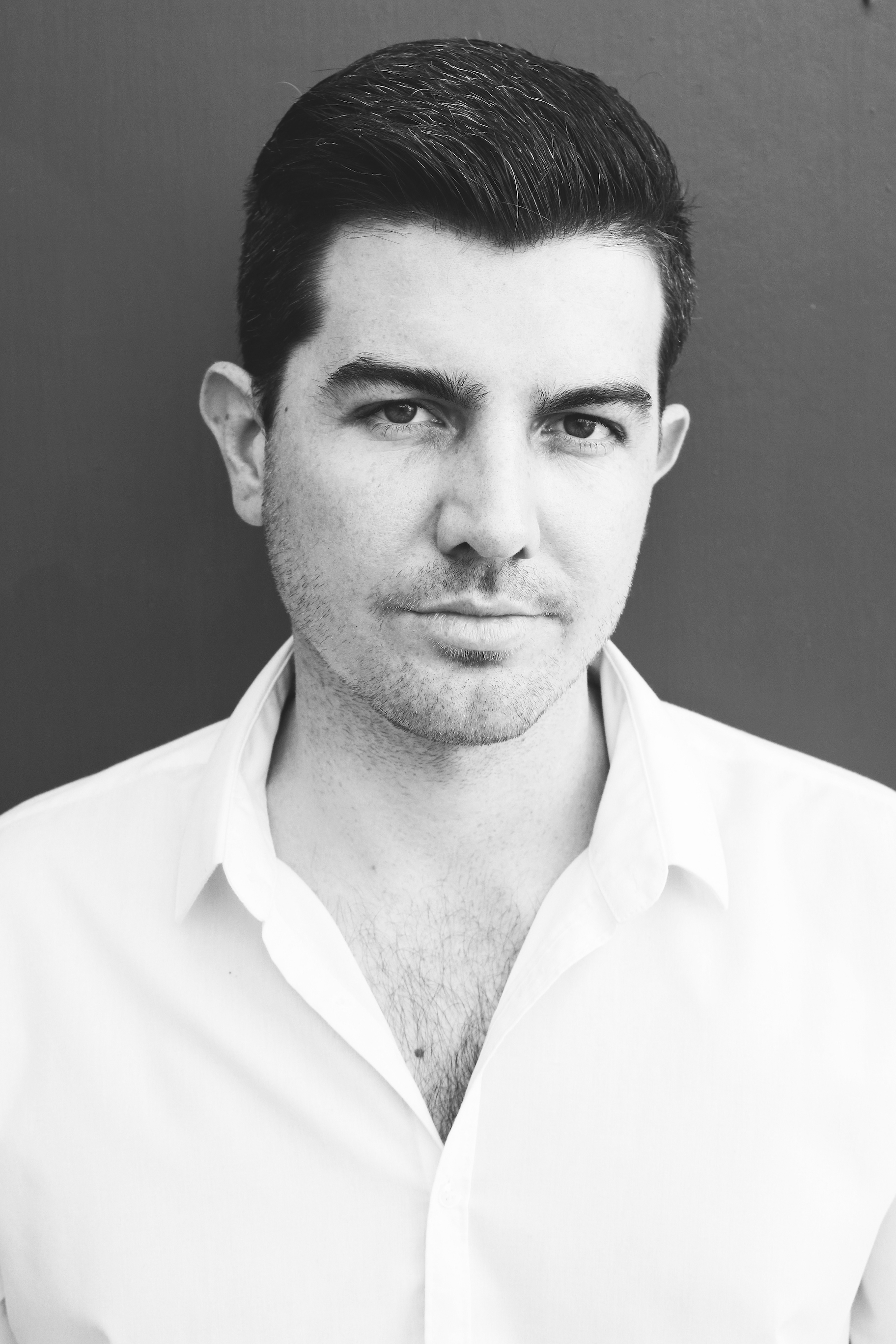
Bass–baritone James Olds

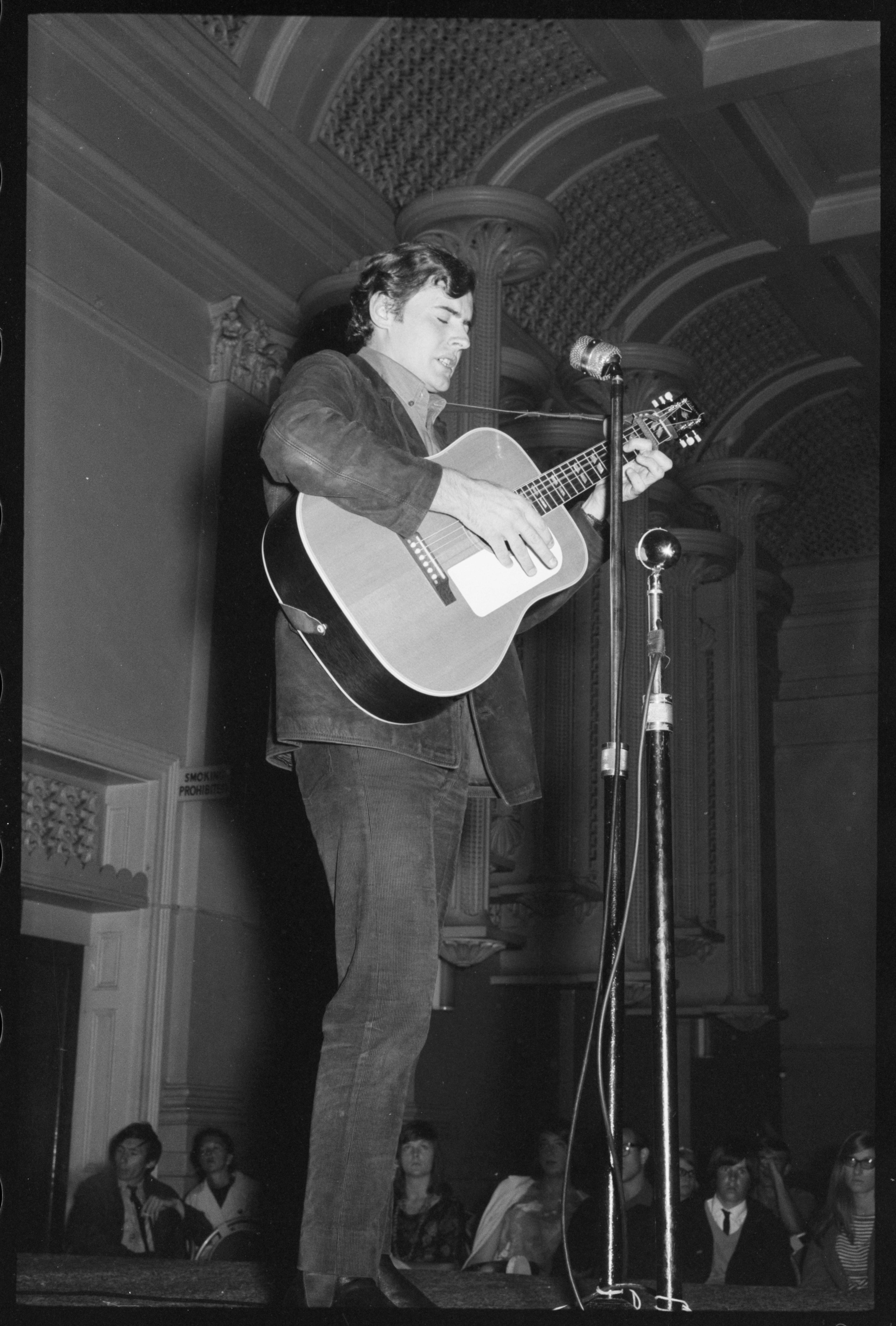
Folk singer Gary Shearston

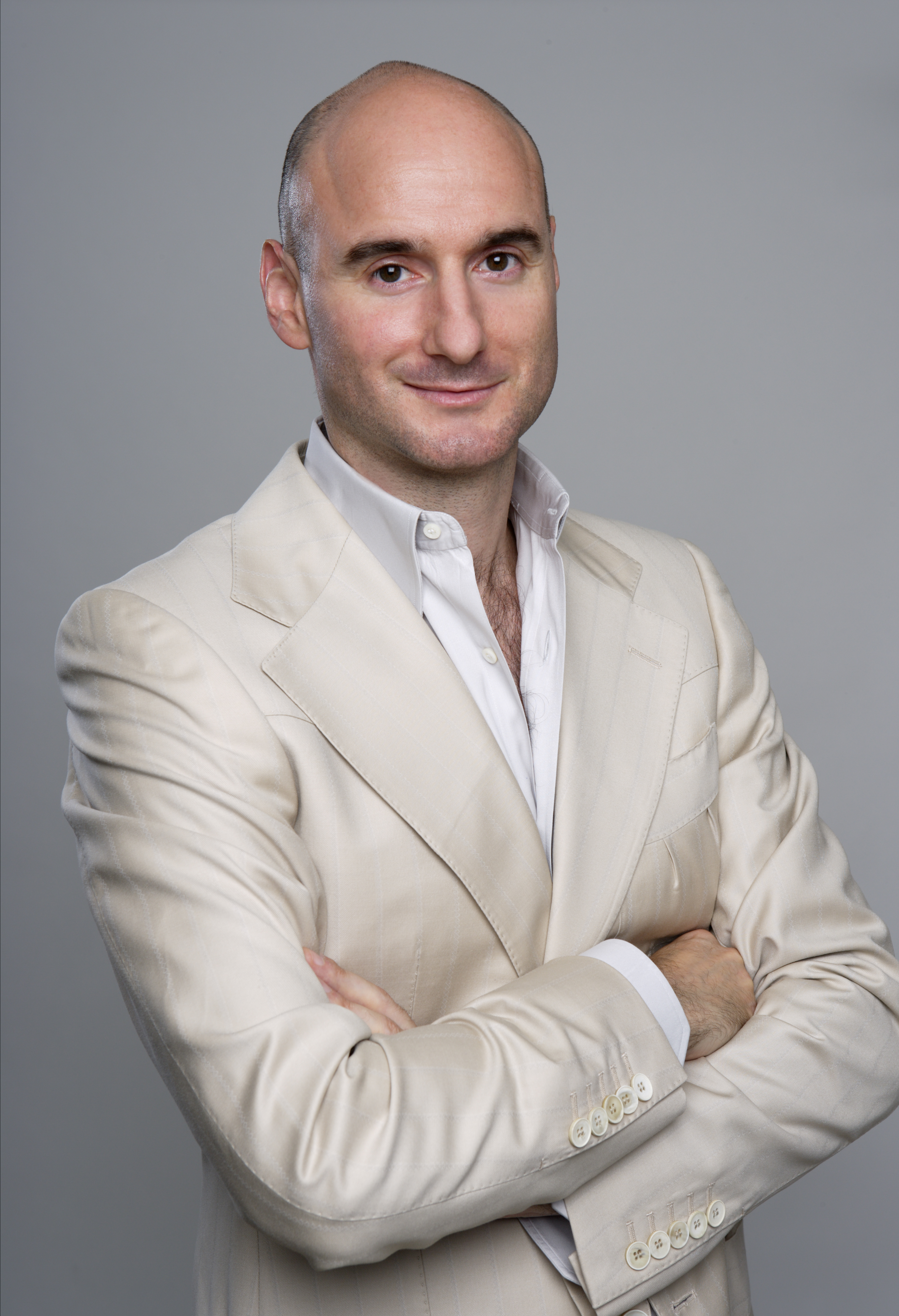
Art critic Benjamin Genocchio

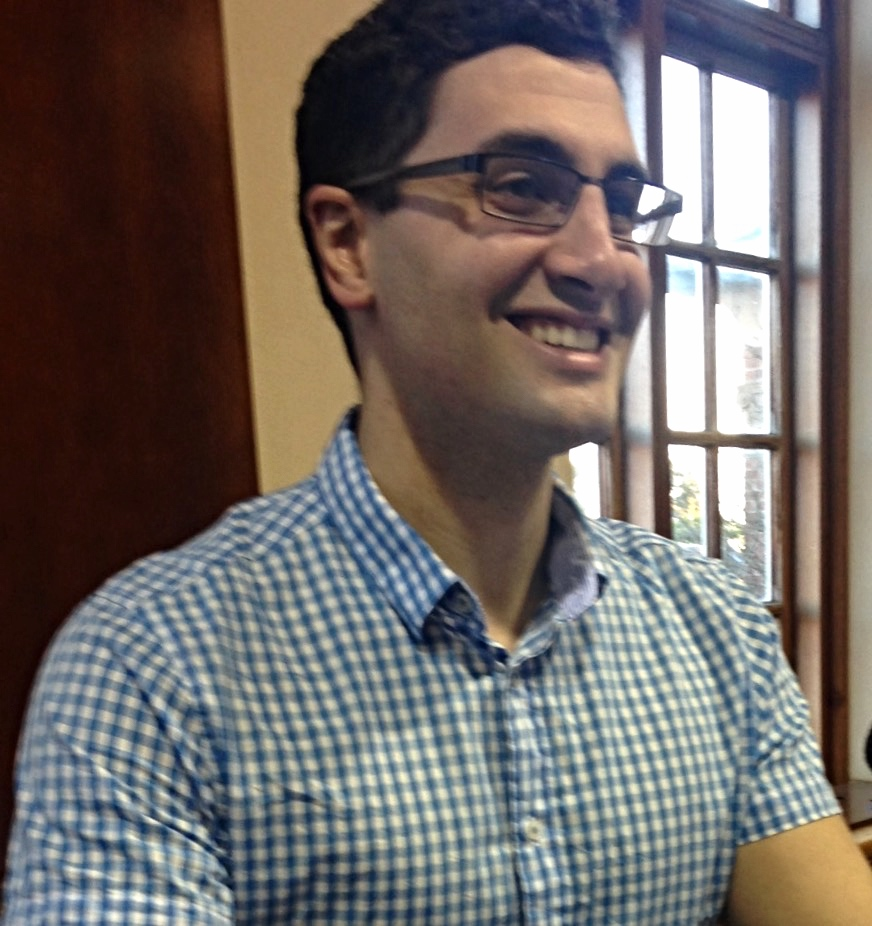
Author Will Kostakis

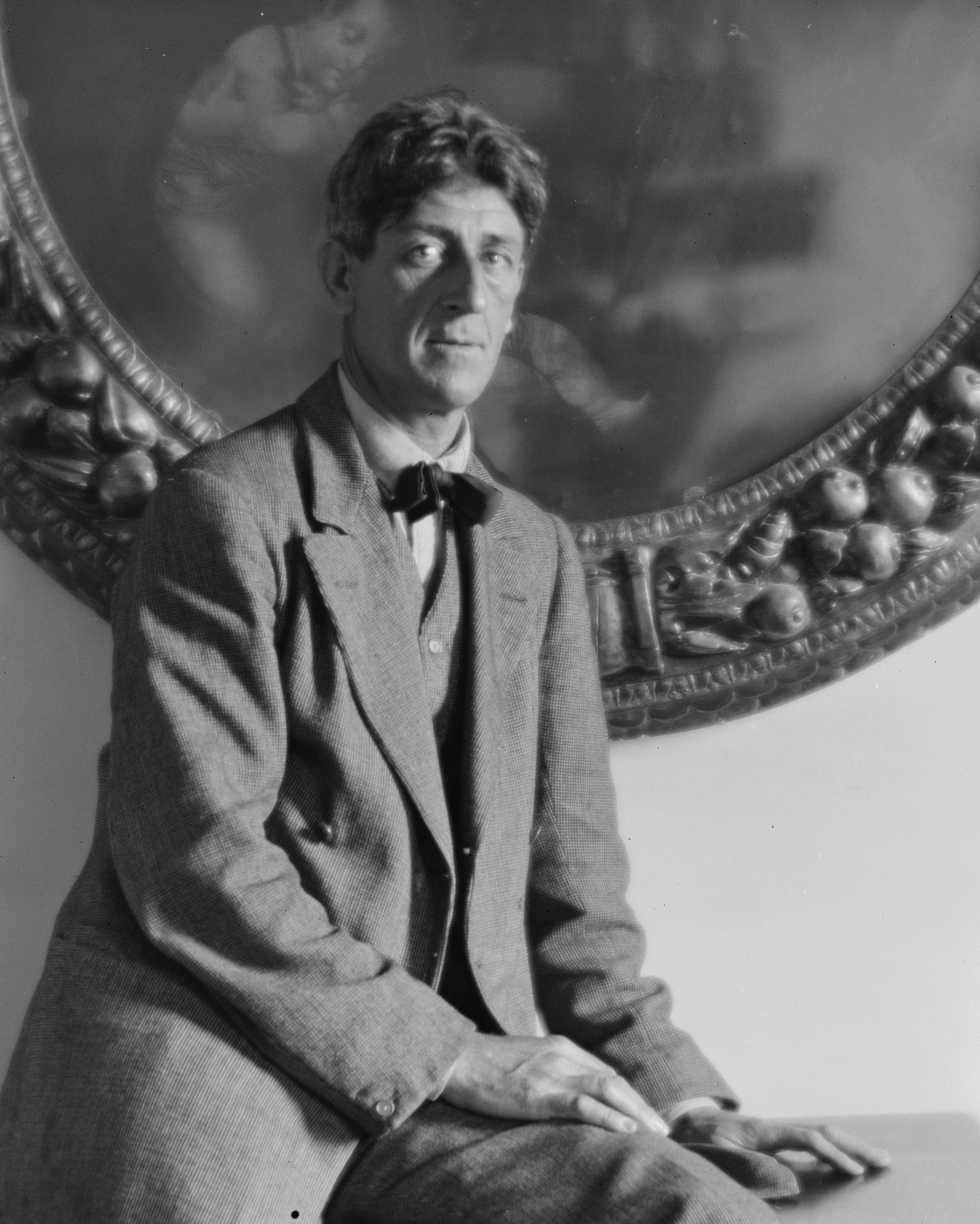
Architect William Hardy Wilson

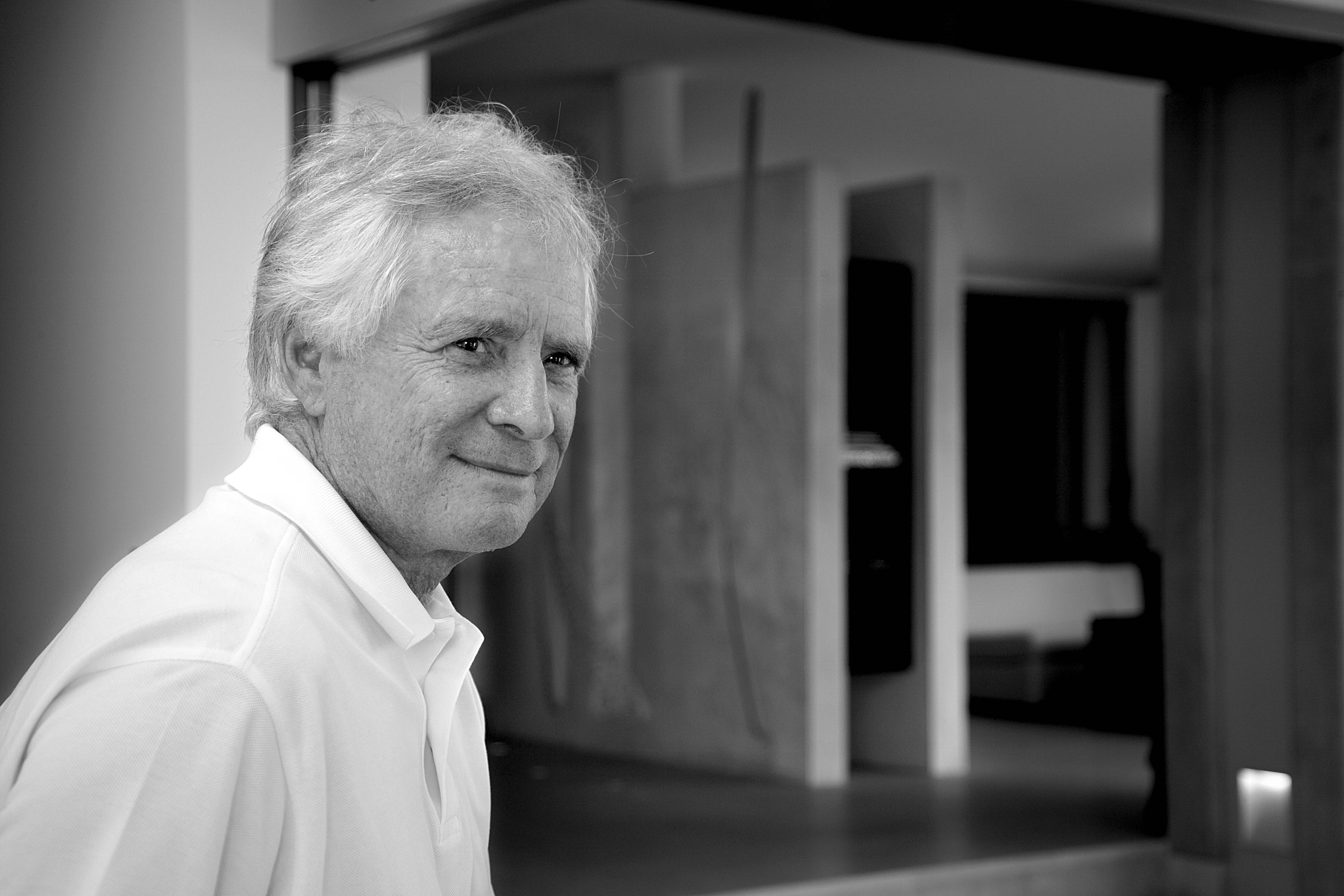
Architect Alex Popov

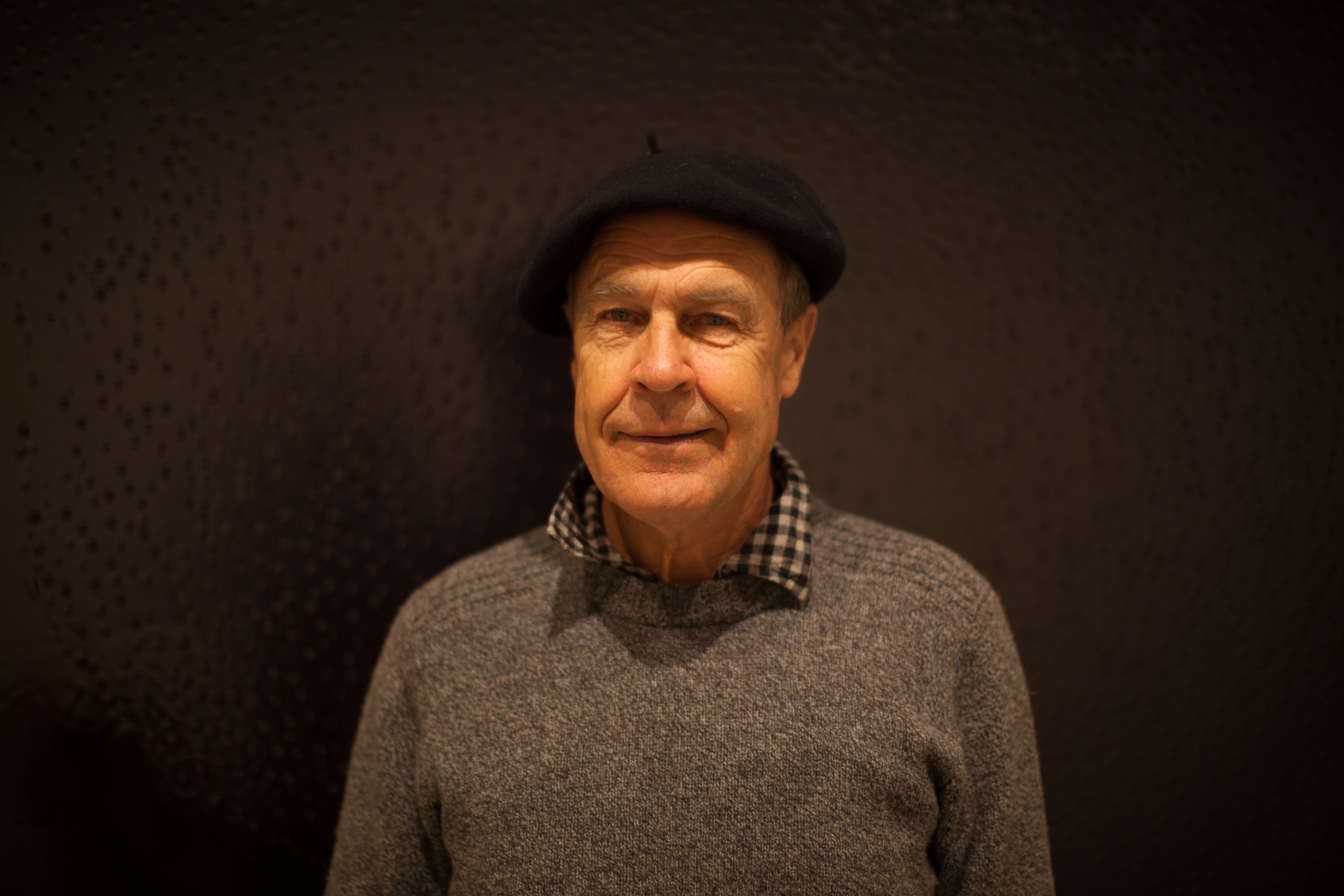
Architect Colin Still

== Royalty, viceroys & chiefs ==
- HM King Tāufaʻāhau Tupou IV (1934–1938) – former King of Tonga
- HRH Prince Viliami Tungī Mailefihi (1896–1897) – Prince Consort of HM Queen Sālote Tupou III of Tonga
- HRH Prince Fatafehi Tu'ipelehake (1941–1942) – son of HM Queen Sālote Tupou III of Tonga
- HH Prince Josefa Celua (1872–1873) – son of the King of Fiji and grandfather of;
- Ratu Sir George Cakobau GCMG GCVO OBE KStJ RVC (1927–1932) – former Governor-General of Fiji
- Ratu Josefa Lalabalavu (1874–1876) – Tui Cakau Paramount Chief of Cakaudrove Province 1879 until 1905

== Tongan nobles ==
- Hon Fotuʻa Falefā Veikune (1896–1897) – Governor of Vavaʻu 1936–1939 and Minister of Police 1939–1952
- Hon Solomone Ula Ata OBE (1896–1902) – Tongan nobleman and cousin of Queen Sālote
- The Noble Tuʻihaʻateiho (1919–1922) – Tongan nobleman and cousin of Queen Sālote
- The Noble Tuʻiʻāfitu (1953–1955) – former governor of Vavaʻu
- The Lord Luani (1972–1977) – former governor of Vavaʻu
- The Lord Vahaʻi (1955–1966) – civil servant, parliamentarian, and husband of Princess ʻElisiva Fusipala Vahaʻi
- The Lord Taumoepeau-Tupou of Toula and Kotu (1953–1962) – diplomat, cabinet minister and Life Peer

== Baronetage of England ==
- Sir Gordon Trollope Bt (1898–1901) 15th Baronet Trollope of Casewick
- Hugh Trollope (1964–1966) is the heir presumptive to the baronetcy

== Politics and government ==
=== Parliamentary service ===
==== Australia ====
- The Hon Ian Armstrong AM OBE (1949–1953) – Former Deputy Premier of New South Wales
- Jeff Bate (1918–1921) – former NSW and Commonwealth Parliamentarian and husband of Dame Zara Bate
- Henry Bate (1897–1899) – former NSW Parliamentarian
- The Hon Sir Thomas Bavin KCMG (1889–1890) – former Premier of New South Wales
- The Hon Eric Bowden (1882–1884) – former Australian Defence Minister
- Percy Colquhoun (1881–1885) – former Member NSW Legislative Assembly
- The Hon Colonel Arthur Colvin CBE MC MLC (1897–1898) – former Member NSW Legislative Council, Soldier, Surgeon and Physician
- The Hon John Cull (1962–1969) – former member of the New South Wales Legislative Assembly
- The Hon Duncan Gay AM MLC (1962–1967) – former Leader of The Nationals & Deputy Opposition Leader in the NSW Legislative Council
- The Hon Carl Glasgow (1896–1899) – former NSW Parliamentarian
- The Hon Harry Jago (1927–28) – former NSW Health Minister
- The Hon Andrew Lysaght (1888–90) – former NSW Attorney-General and Justice Minister
- The Hon Sir Charles Marr KCVO DSO MC (1895) – former Australian Health Minister
- William Rupert McCourt CMG (1899–1901) – former Clerk of the New South Wales Legislative Assembly
- The Hon Samuel Moore (1865–1869) – former NSW Secretary for Mines and Minister for Agriculture, and Secretary for Lands
- Neville Perkins OAM (1963–1969) – former Northern Territory MLA
- The Hon Lt Col Murray Robson CBE DSO (1918–1923) – former NSW Leader of the Opposition
- The Hon William Robson MLC (1882–1886) – former member NSW Legislative Council and NSW Legislative Assembly
- The Hon Richard Thompson MLC (1922–1294) – former member NSW Legislative Council
- The Hon Sir Frederick Tout MLC (1886–1890) – former member NSW Legislative Council
- Ivor Vidler CBE (1925–1928) – former Clerk of the NSW Legislative Assembly
- The Hon Winter Warden MLC (1875–1878) – former member NSW Legislative Council
- The Hon Reginald Weaver (1890–1894) – former Speaker of the New South Wales Legislative Assembly, Leader of the Opposition and Health Minister
- The Hon Robert Webster (1963–1969) – former NSW Planning Minister and Sydney Partner Korn/Ferry International
- Trent Zimmerman (1974–1986) – former Federal Member for North Sydney

==== Papua New Guinea ====
- Sir Peter Barter GCL OBE (1952–1955) – former Papua New Guinea Government Minister

==== Tonga ====
- HRH Prince Viliami Tungī Mailefihi CBE (1896–1897) – Prime Minister 1923–1941
- Hon. Solomone Ula Ata OBE (1896–1902) – Prime Minister 1941–1949
- Hon. Havea Tuiʻhaʻateiho OBE (1919–1922) – Deputy Prime Minister 1953–1960
- HRH Crown Prince Tāufaʻāhau Tungi KBE (1934–1938) – Prime Minister 1949–1965
- HRH Prince Fatafehi Tuʻipelehake CBE (1941–1942) – Prime Minister 1965–1991
- Molitoni Finau (1896–1901) – Member of the Legislative Assembly of Tonga from 1919 until 1965
- Lupeti Finau (1933–1936) – Member of the Legislative Assembly of Tonga from 1978 until 1979

==== Samoa ====
- Hon. Papaliʻi Laupepa (1951–1958) – Member of the Legislative Assembly of Samoa from 1982 until 1985 and Minister of Justice. He was the son of the paramount chief of Samoa, Malietoa Tanumafili II.

==== United States ====
- Mark Keam (1980–1984) – Member of the Virginia House of Delegates representing the 35th District

=== Local government ===
- Lancelot Bavin (1896–1899) – former Mayor of the Municipality of Willougbhy
- Daniel Bott (1991–1998) – former Mayor of the Municipality of Strathfield
- George Keith Cowlishaw (1913–1920) – former Mayor of Mosman Council
- Colonel Arthur Colvin MC (1897–1900) – former Mayor of the City of Orange
- William Dean (1875–1879) – Mayor of Windsor Shire on twelve occasions from 1893 until 1931
- David Doust (1971–1978) – former mayor of the Municipality of Burwood
- William Horner Fletcher (1865-1866) – former mayor of Manly Council
- John Fowler (1968–1971) – former Mayor of the City of South Sydney
- Ross Fowler OAM (1963–1968) – former Mayor of Penrith City Council
- Percy Hordern (1874-1878) – former mayor of Petersham
- Edward Howard (1877–1878) – former Mayor of both the City of Goulburn and the Municipality of Yass
- John Hunt (1872–1874) – former president of Hornsby Shire
- Harry Jago (1927–1928) – former mayor of Ku-ring-gai Council
- Joseph Cuthbert Kershaw (1887–1890) – former mayor of Waverley Council
- Royce Jeffrey (1923–1932) – former mayor of North Sydney Council
- Brigadier General John Lamrock CB VD (1873–1874) – former president of Colo Shire Council
- Richard Lennon (1947–1949) – former mayor of the Ku-ring-gai Council
- John Lincoln AM (1929–1934) – former mayor of North Sydney Council
- Harold T. Morgan (1882-1883) – former mayor of Municipality of Newtown
- Aubrey Murphy MBE (1902–1906) – former mayor of the Blue Mountains City Council
- Percy Nolan (1899–1902) – former mayor of Manly Council
- Walter Cresswell O'Reilly (1894–1896) – former mayor of the Ku-ring-gai Council
- Lord Livingstone Ramsay (1882–1885) – former president of Hornsby Shire
- William Robson (1882–1886) – former mayor of the Municipality of Ashfield
- Edwin Sautelle (1888–1892) – former mayor of the Municipality of Vaucluse
- John Sautelle (1885-1891) – former president of Bibbenluke Shire Council
- Robert Staines (1901–1902) – former chairman of the Shire of Banana

=== The civil service ===
- George Beal ISO (1884–1886) – former Queensland Auditor-General
- Dr John Burton (1924–1932) – former Head Department of External Affairs, High Commissioner and Founder Centre for the Analysis of Conflict
- Dr Bruce Maitland Carruthers OBE (1906–1908) – former director-general of health in Tasmania
- John Harper (1867–1869) – former Chief Commissioner of Railways and Tramways NSW
- Parker Henson (1918–1922) – former chairman Sydney County Council
- Walter Loveridge CMG (1880–1884) – former president of the Sydney Harbour Trust
- Alastair MacGibbon (1980–1985) – former chief executive Australian Cyber Security Centre
- Walter Cresswell O'Reilly (1894–1896) – former Commonwealth Film Censor
- Warren Pearson AM (1978–1982) – former chief executive officer of the National Australia Day Council
- Neville Perkins OAM (1963–1969) – former Secretary of Aboriginal Affairs NSW
- Harold Quodling (1881–1883) – former Director Queensland Department of Agriculture
- Thomas J. Roseby (1881–1883) – former Secretary of Sydney Metropolitan Water, Sewerage and Drainage Board
- James Tandy MBE (1932–1933) – former Commonwealth Director of Aboriginal Education
- Dr Don Weatherburn PSM (1964–1969) – Professor at the National Drug and Alcohol Research Centre at the University of New South Wales and former director of the NSW Bureau of Crime Statistics and Research

=== The diplomatic service ===
- Dennis Argall (1955–1959) – Australian Ambassador to China 1984–1985
- Dr Brian Babington AM (1968–1973) – Australian Delegate to the United Nations 1988–1992
- Dr John Burton (1924–1932) – Australian High Commissioner to Celyon 1951
- Jonathan Gilbert (1983–1995) – Australian Ambassador to Kuwait since 2017
- Sir Iven Mackay (1897–1900) – Australian High Commissioner to India 1943–1948
- Ric Wells (1968–1973) – Australian Ambassador to France 2011–2014
- David Yardley (1986–1996) – Australian High Commissioner to Kiribati since 2021

== The armed services ==
- Rear Admiral Gerry Carwardine AO (1947–1953) – former Commandant Australian Defence Force Academy
- Flight Lieutenant Keith Chisholm MC DFM (1930–1936) – pilot recognised for his exploits with the Polish and French resistance, after being shot down over France
- Lieutenant Clive Crowley DCM (1905–1906) – Died during World War I and letters between him and his mother were part of the inspiration for An Australian War Requiem
- Rear Admiral Bill Dovers CSC (1959–1969) – former naval officer
- Squadron Leader Adrian Goldsmith DFC DFM (1930–1933) – Second World War flying ace
- Brigadier General John Lamrock CB VD (1873–1874) – in command of the 20th Battalion, Australian Imperial Force, in the Gallipoli Campaign
- Commodore Bruce Loxton (1933–1935) – former director-general of Naval Manpower in the Royal Australian Navy and naval historian
- Lieutenant Colonel Alex Bath 'Bandy' MacDonald (1913–1916) – former Commander Darwin Mobile Force and Director Australian Cadet Corps
- Lieutenant Colonel Tom Mills MC & Bar (1919–1925) – the first of only fifteen Australian soldiers to be awarded the MC & Bar during World War II
- Major General Sir Iven Mackay KBE CMG DSO VD (1897–1900) – Commander 2nd Division, 6th Division and South West Pacific Area World War II
- Lieutenant Colonel Roy Morell DSO OBE (1903–1905) – volunteered for war service during World War I and World War II
- Major General Sandy Pearson AO DSO OBE MC (1932–1936) – Commander Australian Forces Vietnam War and former Commandant Royal Military College, Duntroon
- Captain Oliver Woodward CMG MC (1903–1904) – soldier noted for his tunnelling activities at the Ypres Salient during the First World War and the subject of the 2010 Australian war film Beneath Hill 60

== Academia, education, cultural and scientific institutions ==
=== The humanities ===
- Professor Harold Hunt (1916–1920) – former dean of the Faculty of Arts University of Melbourne
- Associate Professor Benjamin Penny (1972–1977) – Research Fellow, School of Culture, History & Language ANU College of Asia and the Pacific and Harold White Fellow at the National Library of Australia

=== The social sciences ===
- Dr Bob Howard (1950–1954) – academic specialising in international relations, former editor of the Current Affairs Bulletin
- Professor Wayne Hudson (1957–1961) – academic and visiting fellow at ANU Australian Studies Institute

=== The arts ===
- Professor Duncan Gifford (1985–1990) – professor Spanish National Academy of Contemporary Music
- Professor Simon Penny (1972–1977) (1968–1973) – professor of Studio Art, Electrical Engineering and Computer Science at the University of California, Irvine
- Professor Lyndon Watts (1992–1993) – professor of bassoon at Berne University of the Arts

=== Theology ===
- Professor Hubert Cunliffe-Jones (1917–1921) – former professor of theology at the University of Manchester

=== Legal scholarship and education ===
- Sir Carleton Allen MC KC (1900–1906) – former professor of Jurisprudence University of Oxford and Warden of Rhodes House
- Professor Bob Baxt AO (1947–1955) – former Dean of Law Monash University and former chairman Trade Practices Commission
- Jonathan Bonnitcha (1993–1998) – Associate Professor of Law University of New South Wales
- Prof Stuart Kaye (1980–1985) – Professor of Law University of Melbourne, former Dean of Law University of Wollongong and former Head of the Law School James Cook University
- Professor Christopher Roper AM (1955–1961) – former Adjunct Professor City University of Hong Kong, former Director College of Law Sydney and former Professor College of Law England and Wales

=== Mathematics, the natural sciences and engineering ===
- Harold Curlewis (1884–1893) – former Government Astronomer in Western Australia and 3898 Curlewis is named in his honour
- William Dun (1982–1886) – palaeontologist, geologist and former president Royal Society of New South Wales
- Joseph Fletcher (1865–1867) – former director of Linnean Society of New South Wales, biologist and editor
- Emeritus Professor James de Haseth (1957–1965) – Emeritus Professor of Chemistry at the University of Georgia
- Professor Roger Hawken (1893–1896) – former professor of Engineering at the University of Queensland
- Professor Chris Rodger (1968–1973) – Scharnagel Professor of Mathematical Sciences at the Auburn University
- Emeritus Professor Sever Sternhell AO (1947) – organic chemist
- Professor Walter Woolnough (1893–1894) – former professor of Geology at the University of Western Australia and Clarke Medalist

=== Medical research ===
- Professor Bernard Balleine (1974–1979) – Head, Decision Neuroscience Laboratory, School of Psychology, University of New South Wales
- Associate Professor John Carter AO (1957–1961) – endocrinologist and former president Australian Diabetes Society
- Professor Graham Colditz (1969–1972) – Niess-Gain Professor at Washington University School of Medicine
- Dr Ian Colditz (1969–1974) – Senior Principal Research Scientist, Commonwealth Scientific and Industrial Research Organisation
- Professor Greg Fulcher OAM (1963–1968) – diabetologist and former Director Chronic and Complex Medicine Network, NSLHD
- Professor Peter Green (1959–1964) – Director, Celiac Disease Center, Columbia University
- Professor Brin Grenyer OAM (1970–1980) – Professor of Psychology at the University of Wollongong and Director of the Project Air Strategy for Personality Disorders
- Dr Marshall Hatch AM (1947–1950) – Chief Research Scientist, CSIRO Division of Plant Industry and Clarke Medalist
- Dr Krishna Hort (1964–1969) – Head, Health Systems Unit, Nossal Institute for Global Health, University of Melbourne
- Dr Colin Laverty OAM (1949–1953) – gynaecological cytologist and histopathologist
- Professor Reuben Rose (1958–1966) – former Dean of Veterinary Science at the University of Sydney
- Professor Martin Stockler (1971–1978) – Professor of Oncology and Clinical Epidemiology, University of Sydney Medical School
- Emeritus Professor John Turtle AO (1947–1953) – former Kellion Professor of Endocrinology University of Sydney, Co-founder Australian Diabetes Society and former president International Diabetes Federation
- Professor Donald Wood-Smith (1944–1947) – Professor of Clinical Surgery, Columbia University New York

=== University administrators ===
- Sir Percival Halse Rogers KBE (1896–1901) – former Chancellor of University of Sydney
- Dr Cecil Purser (1879–1881) – former Deputy Chancellor of University of Sydney
- Professor Nicholas Saunders AO (1959–1962) – former vice-chancellor University of Newcastle and former Dean of Medicine Monash University and Flinders University
- Dr Louis T. Talbot (1902–1904) – former president of Biola University and eponym of the Talbot School of Theology
- The Reverend James Udy (1933) – former Master of Wesley College University of Sydney

=== Schoolmasters ===
- Dr Peter Crawley (1965–1971) – pioneer of computer use in school classrooms at Trinity Grammar School, Victoria, Knox Grammar School and St Hilda's School
- Reverend Dr Michael Scott Fletcher (1883–1886) – founding Master of Wesley College, University of Sydney and Professor of Philosophy, University of Queensland
- Ray Hille OAM (1955–1961) – former Principal of The Peninsula School
- Major General Sir Iven Mackay KBE CMG DSO VD (1897–1900) – former Headmaster of Cranbrook School and former chairman AAGPS NSW
- Sandy Phillips (1894–1898) – former Headmaster of Sydney Grammar School

=== Cultural and scientific organisations ===
- Dr George Abbott (1881–1884) – former president of the Royal Australian Historical Society
- Torrington Blatchford (1886–1890) – former Government Geologist Western Australia and executive board member of Council for Scientific and Industrial Research
- Noel Burnet (1916–1920) – founder of Koala Park Sanctuary
- Douglas Burrows MBE CBE (1932–1934) – co-founder of the Children's Medical Research Foundation
- Dr Warwick Cathro (1957–1964) – former Assistant Director-General National Library of Australia who was pivotal in the development of Trove
- Sir Richard Boyer KBE (1901–1909) – former chairman Australian Broadcasting Commission
- Dr Colin Branch (1951–1952) – former chairman of the Minerals and Energy Research Institute of Western Australia
- Sir Ian Clunies Ross (1912–1916) – former chairman CSIRO
- Sir Talbot Duckmanton CBE (1934–1938) – former general manager Australian Broadcasting Commission
- Tim Hart (1977–1979) – Director of Information, Multimedia and Technology Melbourne Museum and Director Royal Exhibition Building
- Dr Andrew Houison (1863–1865) – founding president of the Royal Australian Historical Society
- Frank Howarth AM PSM (1963–1969) – Chair of NSW Heritage Council and Former Director Australian Museum and Royal Botanic Gardens, Sydney
- Howard McKern (1931–1935) – former Deputy Director Museum of Applied Arts and Sciences
- Walter Cresswell O'Reilly (1894–1896) – founding president of the National Trust of Australia (NSW)
- Jim Service AO (1945–1949) – former chairman National Museum of Australia and National Gallery of Australia Foundation
- Ian Stephenson (1965–1972) – curator at the University of New England and former Director Canberra Museum and Gallery and Historic Places ACT

==== Royal Society of New South Wales ====
- Associate Professor Ronald Aston (1912–1918) – President, 1948
- Professor Bernard Balleine (1974–1979) – Fellow
- Dr Keith Crook (1944–1949) – Clarke Medal for Geology, 1983
- Joseph James Fletcher (1865–1867) – Clarke Medal for Biology, 1921
- Dr Marshall Hatch AM (1947–1950) – Clarke Medal for Botany, 1973
- Dr Donald Hector AM (1957–1967) – President, 2012–2015
- Howard McKern (1931–1935) – President, 1963
- Dr Gordon Packham (1943–1947) – Clarke Medal for Geology, 2001
- Professor Henry Priestley (1898–1901) – President, 1942
- William Sutherland Dun (1882–1886) – President, 1918
- Professor Walter George Woolnough (1893–1894) – Clarke Medal for Geology, 1933 and president, 1926

== The professions ==
=== Religion ===
- Major Cyril Bavin OBE (1893–1895) – former Methodist missionary in Fiji and General Secretary to the YMCA Migration Department
- Reverend Anthony Brammall (1973–1978) – Vice-Principal of the Sydney Missionary and Bible College
- Reverend Alex Campbell OBE (1891–1901) – former chairman Congregational Union of Australia and New Zealand and president Sydney City Mission
- Reverend Prof Hubert Cunliffe-Jones (1917–1921) – former chairman of the Congregational Union of England and Wales
- Reverend Lionel B. Fletcher D.D. (1877–1954) – Evangelist and Congregational minister
- Reverend Simon Hansford (1971–1980) – Moderator Synod of New South Wales and the ACT of the Uniting Church in Australia
- Gary Hill (1973–1978) – Executive Director The Crusader Union of Australia
- Reverend Dr David Manton OAM (1949–1953) – former Moderator New South Wales Synod, Uniting Church in Australia
- Right Reverend David Mulready (1960–1964) – former Anglican Bishop of North-West Australia
- Right Reverend John Stewart (1953–1954) – former Bishop of the Eastern Region and Vicar General of the Anglican Diocese of Melbourne
- Reverend Gloster Udy OAM MBE (1933) – Uniting Church in Australia Minister

=== Law ===
==== Judges ====
- The Hon. Justice Kenneth Asprey CMG KC (1914–1922) – former NSW Supreme Court Judge and Voyager Royal Commissioner
- The Hon. Sir Thomas Bavin KCMG (1889–1890) – former judge of the Supreme Court of New South Wales
- The Hon. Justice Cecil Cook (1912–1920) – former judge of the Industrial Commission of New South Wales
- His Honour Judge Herbert Curlewis (1881–1887) – former judge of the District Court of New South Wales; husband of Ethel Turner
- The Hon. Garry Downes AM KC (1956–1960) – former Federal Court Judge, President Administrative Appeals Tribunal and former president Union Internationale des Avocats
- His Honour Judge David Edwards (1889–91) – former judge of the District Court of New South Wales, NSW Electoral Commissioner and Royal Commissioner
- The Hon. Roger Gyles AO KC (1950–1954) – former Federal Court Judge, Royal Commissioner Building Industry in New South Wales and former president NSW Bar Association and Australian Bar Association
- The Hon. Justice Sir Percival Halse Rogers KBE (1896–1901) – former judge of the Supreme Court of New South Wales
- His Honour Dr John Lincoln AM (1929–1934) – judge of the District Court of New South Wales
- The Hon. Justice Edwin Lusher KC (1925–1931) – former judge of the Supreme Court of New South Wales
- The Hon. Justice Leycester Meares AC CMG KC (1924–1926) – former judge of the Supreme Court of New South Wales, chairman of the New South Wales Law Reform Commission
- The Hon. Master William Parker (1883–1887) – former NSW Master in Equity and Lunacy
- The Hon. Angus Talbot (1949–1953) – former judge of the Land and Environment Court of New South Wales
- The Hon. Justice Richard White (1967–1972) – NSW Supreme Court Judge
- The Hon. Horton Williams KC (1947–1950) – former Supreme Court of South Australia Judge
- The Hon. Justice George Wright (1934–1935) – former Supreme Court of Western Australia Judge

==== Other legal professionals ====
- Arthur E. Abbott (1888–1894) – former senior partner Garland, Seaborn, Abbott and president of the Law Society of New South Wales
- Ian Barker KC (1948–1952) – former Solicitor-General of the Northern Territory, and former president New South Wales Bar Association
- Percy Dawson (1881–1883) – founding partner of one of the firms that became Ashurst Australia
- Stuart Fuller (1979–1984) – former global managing partner King & Wood Mallesons and Global Head of Legal Services, KPMG
- Milton Love (1852–1924) – stipendary magistrate
- Alan Loxton AM (1931–1933) – former senior partner Allen, Allen and Hemsley and President of the Law Society of New South Wales
- Reginald Kerr Manning (1878–1882) – established and edited with George Rich The Bankruptcy and Company Law Cases of New South Wales.
- John Nelson (1951–1953) – former partner Gadens and president of the Law Society of New South Wales
- A.B. Shand KC (1880–1881) – Sydney barrister and Royal Commissioner
- John J. Watling (1912–1918) – former partner Sly & Russell and President of the Law Society of New South Wales
- David Wilson KC (1891–1896) – Sydney barrister, former owner of Tocal and furniture maker

=== Medicine ===
- Dr George Henry Abbott (1881–1884) – surgeon and former Fellow of the University of Sydney Senate
- Dr Alan Colwell (1900–1910) – former president of the Australian College of Radiologists
- Dr Stanley Devenish Meares CBE (1921–1924) – former president Australian Council Royal College of Obstetricians and Gynaecologists
- Harry Critchley Hinder (1881–1883) – surgeon and former president of the NSW Branch of the British Medical Association
- Sir Keith Jones (1924–1927) – surgeon and former president of the Australian Medical Association
- Sir Herbert Maitland (1883–1887) – surgeon and early specialist in rhinoplasty
- Sir William Morrow DSO ED (1919–1921) – former president Royal Australasian College of Physicians
- John Moulton OAM (1949) – former Wallabies team doctor and surgeon
- Dr Herbert Russell Nolan (1880–1885) – performed the first appendicectomy in Australia
- Bob Norton OBE (1933–1940) – former president of the Royal Australasian College of Dental Surgeons
- Dr Hugh Pearson MBE (1931–1936) – surgical urologist, instrumental in the foundation of the Australian Kidney Foundation
- Professor Bill Pomroy (1965–1971) – Professor of Veterinary Parasitology at the Massey University
- Dr Cecil Purser (1879–1881) – former chairman of the Royal Prince Alfred Hospital
- Brian Sommerlad (1954–1958) – honorary consultant plastic surgeon who was a co-founder in 2007 and is now chairman of the UK charity CLEFT which funds research into the causes and treatment of clefts and supports cleft centres in several low-resource countries
- Dr Frank Tidswell (1881–1884) – former director New South Wales Government Bureau of Microbiology and Director of Pathology at the Royal Alexandra Hospital for Children
- Dr C. Savill Willis (1894) – former principal medical officer of the Education Department of NSW

== Business ==
=== Advertising ===
- Chris Mort (1970–1975) – former chairman and CEO McCann Erickson Australia

=== Art and antiques ===
- Peter Cook (1940–1942) – former proprietor Grafton Galleries, Double Bay, and presenter on ABC Television's For Love or Money.
- Barry Stern (1948–1949) – former proprietor Barry Stern Galleries Paddington.

=== Banking and financial services ===
- Sir Frederick Tout (1886–1890) – former chairman of Bank of NSW

=== Business disability advocacy ===
- Dr Mark Bagshaw (1971–1974) – disability reform advocate

=== Business investment ===
- Bee Taechaubol (1987–1992) – private equity investor

=== Broadcasting and entertainment ===
- Bruce Bond (1944–1946) – finance and business broadcaster
- Peter Bush (1964–1970) – former chairman of Nine Entertainment
- Reg Lane (1912–1914) – founded Macquarie Radio Network and former general manager of 2GB
- David Leckie AM (1962–1968) – former CEO Nine Network and former managing director Seven Network
- Garth Barraclough OBE (1924–1928) – former chairman EMI

=== Building ===
- Richard Crookes (1956–1961) – founded Richard Crookes Constructions in 1976
- Ben Cottle (1974–1981) – founder and managing director of FDC Construction
- John Cooper (1961–1967) – board member and general manager of Concrete Constructions
- Phil Kearns AM (1979–1984) – Chief Executive Officer and Managing Director of AVJennings
- Alex Rigby AM ED (1929–1933) – past president of the Australian Institute of Building 1970–1972 and Director of Kell & Rigby 1952–1984

=== Computing ===
- Ian Diery (1958–1967) – former vice-president Apple Inc.

=== Farming and grazing ===
- Deuchar Gordon (1882) – Manar, Braidwood
- Hugh Munro (1874–1878) – Keera, Bingara
- Hunter White (1883–1885) – Havilah, Mudgee, New South Wales

=== Food and beverage production ===
- Geoffrey H. Arnott (1918–1920) – former chairman Arnott's Biscuits
- Halse Rogers Arnott (1891–1895) – medical practitioner and former chairman Arnott's Biscuits Holdings
- Garth Barraclough OBE (1924–1928) – former chairman Arnott's Biscuits Holdings
- Peter Bush (1964–1970) – former CEO McDonald's Australia
- Owen Howell-Price (1938–1944) – director and former chairman Dairy Farm South Asia and CEO Woolworths
- David Johnson (1947–1950) – former CEO Campbell's
- Bert Locke OBE (1920–1925) – former chairman Tooheys

=== Horticulture ===
- Myles Baldwin (1991–1996) – garden designer and horticulturist
- Alf Ellison (1918–1920) – camellia breeder after whom the camellia japonica A.O. Ellison is named
- Ben Swane AM (1941–1944) – former proprietor of Swane's Nurseries, Dural, and gardening presenter on ABC Radio Sydney

=== Insurance ===
- Cecil Hoskins (1903–1906) – former chairman of AMP
- John Lawes (1916–1926) – former chairman of QBE Insurance
- Jim Millner AM (1933–1937) – former president NRMA

=== Mining ===
- Oliver Woodward CMG MC (1903–1904) – former general manager and Director of North Broken Hill Mines

=== Optometry ===
- Filmer Sceats (1915—1917) — Canberra and Sydney optometrist

=== Property and real estate development ===
- William Boyce Allen (1865–1867) – one of the first sworn valuers under the Real Property Act in New South Wales
- Bert Locke OBE (1920–1925) – former chairman, Lendlease
- Jim Service AO (1945–1949) – former chairman, JG Service; former chairman, ACTEW; and former deputy chairman, Australand Property Group

=== Racehorse owners and breeders ===
- Alf Ellison (1918–1920) – Star Kingdom, Baramul Stud
- Hunter White (1883–1885) – Rogilla, Havilah Stud

=== Restaurateurs, chefs and sommeliers ===
- Andrew Cibej (1982–1987) – chef and restaurateur, Vini, Berta and 121BC Cantina & Enoteca
- Con Dedes – restaurateur Sydney Rowing Club, Abbotsford, and Kirribilli Club, Dedes on the Wharf, Deckhouse, Dedes at the Point, Flying Fish, Pyrmont, Flying Fish & Chips at The Star, Sydney
- Ned Goodwin (1981–1987) – Master of Wine, sommelier, wine-writer and TV presenter
- Neil Perry AM (1968–1973) – chef and restaurateur Rockpool, food-writer and TV presenter LifeStyle Food

=== Importing, wholesaling and retailing ===
- Preston Lanchester Gowing (1891–1899) – former chairman Gowings
- Percy Hardy (1882–1888) – former managing director Hardy Brothers
- Walter Hardy (1877–1880) – former managing director Hardy Brothers
- Edward Lloyd Jones (1885–1887) – former chairman David Jones
- Jim Millner AM (1933–1937) – Former chairman, Soul Patts
- Robert Millner AO (1959–1968) – chairman, Soul Patts
- Arthur Shorter (1898–1900) – former managing director Shorters
- Arthur H. Way (1879–1881) – former chairman of E. Way & Co. department store in Pitt Street, Sydney
- Mervyn Winn (1920–1924) – former chairman of Winns department stores in Sydney and Newcastle

=== Telecommunications ===
- Robert Millner AO (1959–1968) – chairman, TPG Telecom

=== Forests ===
- Herbert Dadswell (1915–1920) – CSIRO chief of forest products
- Edward Julius (1880–1883) – South Australian Conservator of Forests

=== Wool ===
- Keith Chisholm MC DFM (1930–1936) – woolbuyer
- George Le Couteur OBE (1931–1934) – woolbroker
- Tom Mills MC (1919–1925) – woolbuyer
- Sir Gordon Trollope Bt (1898–1901) – woolbroker

== Philanthropy ==
- Douglas Burrows MBE CBE (1932–1934) – the Sydney Medical School Foundation's Douglas Burrows Chair of Paediatrics and Child Health was established in 1983 in his honour having been Chairman of the Royal Alexandra Hospital for Children and a significant financial supporter
- Elliston Campbell (1902–1908) – through a bequest funded the Adyar Library and Research Centre in Madras, India, and the Campbell Theosophical Research Library for the Theosophical Society, Sydney
- Carlyle Greenwell (1897–1901) – endowed the Carlyle Greenwell Research Fund in Anthropology and Archaeology at the University of Sydney
- Edwin Cuthbert Hall (1886–1891) – endowed the Edwin Cuthbert Hall Chair of Middle Eastern Archaeology at the University of Sydney
- Mervyn Horton AM (1930–1935) – $8 million of contemporary art Art Gallery of New South Wales via the Mervyn Horton Bequest
- George Johnson (1913–1915) – $15 million George and Nerissa Johnson Bequest for the arts
- Dr Colin Laverty OAM (1949–1953) – benefactor of funds and art works to National Gallery of Australia, National Gallery of Victoria, Biennale of Sydney and Gold Coast City Art Gallery
- Colonel Thomas Millner MC VD (1897–1901) – benefactor of TG Millner Field, home ground of Eastwood Rugby Club
- Dr Mitchell Notaras (1948–1952) – endowed the Mitchell J. Notaras Scholarship for Colorectal Medicine at the University of Sydney
- The Hon Justice Leycester Meares AC CMG KC (1924–1926) – benefactor of Kidsafe
- Clive Ramaciotti (1894–1900) – together with his sister, endowed the Clive and Vera Ramaciotti Foundation for Biomedical Research
- Robert Storr (1935–1936) – a banker who endowed, via a bequest, the Robert W. Storr Chair for Hepatic Medicine at the University of Sydney
- Hunter White (1883–1885) – supported post-war repatriation with substantial gifts of land and the Church of England

== Club presidents ==
- Charles Challice (1927–1932) – chairman of the Cabbage Tree Club 1961–1962
- The Hon. Justice Cecil Cook (1912–1920) – president of the University Club 1957–1960
- Clive Curlewis (1884–1890) – former president of Palm Beach Surf Life Saving Club
- Alf Meares (1919–1920) – president of the Schools Club 1933–1935
- Fred Meares (1898–1900) – president of Sydney Rowing Club1954–1964
- Richard Eve (1895–1898) – president of the Schools Club 1943–1945
- William Deuchar Gordon (1882–1884) – president of the Australian Club 1936–1939
- The Hon. Justice Sir Percival Halse Rogers KBE (1896–1901) – president of the University Club 1935–1945
- Eric Sydney Kelynack (1893–1898) – founding President of the Schools Club 1926–1928
- Alan Loxton AM (1931–1933) President of the Australian Club 1987 – 1990
- Sir William Morrow DSO ED (1919–1921) – president of the Australian Club 1972–1975
- Tim Peken OAM (1953–1957) – president of the University & Schools Club 1993–1996
- Bill Picken (1958–1967) – chairman of the Sydney Turf Club 2008–2010
- Doug Stewart (1910–1919) – president of the Schools Club 1937–1939
- Stephen Ward (1951–1956) – president of the Ski Club of Australia 1980–1982

== Sport ==
=== Sporting administrators ===
- Andrew Jones (1978–1990) – former CEO of Racing Victoria and Cricket NSW

=== Athletics ===
- Nigel Barker (1895–1901) – Olympic Games bronze medallist Athletics
- Morgan McDonald (2008–2013) – 2017 World Championships in Athletics distance runner
- Josh Ralph (2004–2009) – 2014 Commonwealth Games
- Stephen Wilson OAM (1984–1987) – Paralympic Games gold medallist Athletics

=== Australian Rules ===
- Dane Rampe (2003–2008) – Sydney Swans player in the Australian Football League
- Jack Hiscox (2007–2012) – Sydney Swans player in the Australian Football League

=== Badminton ===
- Raymond Tam (1995–2004) – Badminton 2014 Commonwealth Games

=== Basketball ===
- Grant Anticevich (2015–2017) – NBL and college basketball player
- Nick Kay (2009–2010) – 2018 Commonwealth Games Basketball gold medalist
- Ray Rosbrook (1915–1939) – former coach of the New South Wales Basketball Team

=== Boxing ===
- Nikita Tszyu (2011-2015) – Light middleweight professional boxer
- Tim Tszyu (2007–2012) – Light middleweight professional boxer and Australian National Boxing Federation's super middleweight champion.

=== Cricket ===
- George Bayly (1874–1875) – New Zealand cricketer
- Tim Caldwell OBE BEM (1927–1930) – former chairman Australian Cricket Board and NSW Sheffield Shield cricketer
- James Cleeve (1881–1884) – former NSW Sheffield Shield cricketer
- Edwin Evans (1865–1866) – former Australian Test cricketer
- Sam Everett (1917–1918) – former NSW Sheffield Shield cricketer
- Tom Garrett (1867–1872) – former Australian Test cricketer
- Arthur Hoskings (1885–1886) Western Australian and North American representative cricketer CEO
- Alan McGilvray AM MBE (1923–1924) – ABC cricket commentator
- Lawrence Neil-Smith (2012–2017) – Tasmanian cricketer
- Johnny Taylor (1906–1915) – former dual international test cricketer and Wallaby

=== Equestrian ===
- Phillip Dutton OAM (1976–1979) – 1996 and 2000 Summer Olympics equestrian dual gold medallist for Australia and 2016 Summer Olympics equestrian Bronze Medallist for USA.
- Shane Rose (1978–1983) – 2008 Summer Olympics equestrian silver medallist and 2016 Summer Olympics equestrian bronze medallist

=== Fishing ===
- Harry Andreas (1891–1895) – Big-game fisherman who pioneered the sport in New Zealand
- Sir Herbert Maitland (1883–1887) – regarded as the father of big-game fishing in Australia

=== Golf ===
- Prosper Ellis (1908–1912) – golf course architect and amateur scratch golfer

=== Hockey ===
- Jett Leong (2023 – ) Represented NSW in field & Indoor hockey & Australia in Indoor Hockey

=== Ice Hockey ===
- Arthur Cuthbertson (1900–1906) – represented NSW in the first two Goodall Cup finals

=== Judo ===
- Warren Richards (1960–1966) – 1976 Summer Olympics judo

=== Rowing ===
- Roy Barker (1894–1900) – 1912 Summer Olympics rowing
- Vern Bowrey (1960–1965) – 1972 Summer Olympics rowing
- Stuart Carter (1971–1976) – 1976 Summer Olympics rowing
- James Chapman (1992–1997) – 2012 Summer Olympics rowing silver medalist
- Tom Chessell (1929–1931) – 1952 Summer Olympics rowing bronze medallist
- Howard Croker OAM (1954–1956) – founder of Croker Oars
- Sam Hardy (2003–2013) 2019 World Rowing Championships bronze medalist
- Steve Handley (1969–1974) – 1980 Summer Olympics rowing
- Rob Jahrling (1991–1992) – 2000 Summer Olympics rowing silver medallist
- Judge Fred Kirkham (1945–1953) – 1956 Summer Olympics rowing bronze medallist
- Matthew Long (1988–1993) – 2000 Summer Olympics rowing bronze medallist
- Kim Mackney (1961–1966) – 1972 Summer Olympics rowing
- Michael Morgan OAM (1957–1964) – 1968 Summer Olympics rowing silver medallist
- Geoff Stewart (1984–1991) – 2000 and 2004 Summer Olympics dual rowing bronze medallist
- James Stewart (1984–1991) – 2000 and 2004 Summer Olympics dual rowing bronze medallist
- Stephen Stewart (1985–1995) – 2004 Summer Olympics rowing bronze medallist
- Richard Wearne (1981–1989) – World Rowing Championships silver and bronze medallist

=== Rugby Union ===
- Allan Alaalatoa (2010–2011) – current ACT Brumbies player
- Eric Bardsley (1918–1923) – former Wallaby
- Scott Bowen (1985–1990) – former Wallaby and Head Coach Eastern Suburbs Rugby Club
- James Brown (1947–1951) – former Wallaby
- Harry Bryant (1917–1923) former Wallaby
- Adam Byrnes (1987–1999) – former Russian Bears, former Melbourne Rebels, Queensland Reds player
- Alan Cameron (1945–1948) – former Wallaby captain
- John Carroll (1946–1949) – former Wallaby
- James Cleeve (1881–1882) – inter-colonial rugby union player
- John Cleeve (1881–1882)) – inter-colonial cricket player
- Percy Colquhoun (1881–1885) – inter-colonial rugby union player
- Dave Cowper (1923–1927) – former Wallaby captain, coach and chairman of selectors
- Sydney Fallick (1882–1885) – inter-colonial rugby union player
- Nick Farr-Jones AM (1974–1979) – former Rugby World Cup winning Wallaby captain
- Vunipola Fifita (2012–2014) – current Brumbies player
- Aub Hodgson (1924–29) – former Wallaby
- Peter Jorgensen (1980–1986) – former Wallaby
- Bruce Judd (1920–1924) – former Wallaby
- Phil Kearns AM (1979–1984) – former Rugby World Cup winning Wallaby and captain
- Bayley Kuenzle (2010–2016) – current Western Force player
- John Lamb (1924–1925) – former Wallaby
- Reg Lane (1912–1914) – claimed one international rugby cap for Australia as a Waratah
- Nathan Lawson (2010–2016) – member of the men's rugby seven's squad at the Tokyo 2020 Olympics.
- Dr Eden Love (1921–1927) – former Wallaby
- Larry Newman (1909–1921) – former Wallaby
- Graeme Macdougall (1953–1958) – former Wallaby
- Stuart Macdougall (1955–1965) – former Wallaby
- George Mackay (1919–1922) – claimed one international rugby cap for Australia as a Waratah
- Bill McLaughlin (1929–1930) – former president of the Australian Rugby Union and Wallaby
- Tepai Moeroa (2011–2013) – Parramatta Eels 2014–2019, Waratahs 2020–present.
- James Egan Moulton Jnr (1882–1888) – played for NSW against the 1888 British Lions Team and against Queensland in inter–colonial games
- Earle Page (1922–1927) – selected for Combined Australian Universities and as a reserve for NSW
- Bryan Palmer (1915–1916) – former Wallaby coach and Waratahs player
- Tom Perrin (1924–1927) – former Wallaby
- Christian Poidevin (2005–2016) – current LA Giltinis player
- Roy Prosser (1949–1959) – former Wallaby
- David Pusey (1987–1996) – former Brumbies, Western Force and Munster Rugby player
- Hugh Roach (1998–2010) – current Waratahs player
- Alan Thorpe (1914–1915) – former Wallaby
- William Tasker (1906–1911) – former Wallaby
- Hugh Taylor (1906–1913) – former Wallaby
- James Turner (2011–2016) — current NSW Waratahs player
- Lachlan Turner (2000–2005) – former Wallaby
- John Williams (1953–1958) – former Wallaby

=== Rugby League ===
- Brian James (1955–1960) – former Kangaroos representative player
- Oriel Kennerson (1937–1940) – Former rugby league player at Newtown Jets
- Joel Luani (2008–2010) – Former NRL player at Wests Tigers
- Joey Lussick (2011–2013) – Current NRL player at Parramatta Eels and former player at Manly Warringah Sea Eagles
- Taane Milne (2011–2013) – Current Super League player at Huddersfield Giants, former NRL player at South Sydney Rabbitohs and St. George Illawarra Dragons
- Tepai Moeroa (2011–2013) – Former NRL player at Parramatta Eels and Melbourne Storm, former player at NSW Waratahs
- Cameron Murray (2010–2015) – Current NRL player and Captain of South Sydney Rabbitohs
- Bailey Simonsson (2014–2016) – Current NRL player at Parramatta Eels and former player at Canberra Raiders
- Toluta'u Koula (2015–2020) – Current NRL player at Manly Warringah Sea Eagles
- Jesse McLean (2021–2022) – Current NRL player at Penrith Panthers
- Heamasi Makasini (2021–2025) – Current NRL player at Wests Tigers

=== Football ===
- Chris Triantis (1999–2004) – current player Sydney Olympic FC
- Jonathan Aspropotamitis (2009–2014) – current player Western Sydney Wanderers FC
- Declan Carmichael (2018-2023) - played for St George City and captained Newington to an AAGPS Plate victory in 2023

=== Sailing ===
- Tony Fisher (1942) – 1973 Sydney to Hobart Yacht Race line honours winning skipper
- David Forbes OAM (1943–1949) – 1972 Summer Olympics sailing gold medalist
- Edward Psaltis (1973–1978) – 1998 Sydney to Hobart Yacht Race handicap winning skipper
- David Witt (1984–1989) – ocean racer and Scallywag skipper
- Garth Bickford (2014–2021) – 2023 Brisbane to Gladstone Race overall winner

=== Tennis ===
- Ashley Campbell (1893–1898) – dual Australian Open men's doubles champion
- Percy Colquhoun (1881–1885) – inter-colonial tennis player
- Albert Curtis (1889–1892) – 1896 Queensland doubles champion 1897 NSW Singles Championship 1905 runner-up in the singles final of the inaugural Australasian Championships
- Stanley Doust (1887–1895) – former Australia Davis Cup team captain and Wimbledon doubles finalist
- Ernest Hicks (1891–1894) – player and manager of the 1913 Australia Davis Cup team
- Thomas Hicks (1885–86) – player and administrator who managed Australasia's participation in early Davis Cup competitions

=== Triathlon ===
- Greg Bennett (1984–1989) – world series champion 2002 and 2003, Australian National Champion 1998, 1999, 2000. Summer Olympics 2004 and 2008 triathlete

=== Water polo ===
- James Clark (2003–2008) – 2012 Summer Olympics water polo
- Anthony Hrysanthos (ON 2013) – 2020 Summer Olympics water polo

== The arts, architecture and the media ==
=== Actors, presenters and directors ===
- Stuart Bocking (1981–1986) – 2UE night shift presenter
- William Carter (1913–1918) – silent film actor who starred in Those Who Love (1926)
- Arthur Dignam (1955–1956) – actor in The Devil's Playground and the original Australian production of Jesus Christ Superstar
- Eden Gaha (1981–1986) – television personality, producer and President of Shine America
- Matt Holmes (1981–1993) – actor in Blue Heelers and Sea Patrol
- John Kachoyan (1995–2000) – creative director at the MKA: Theatre of New Writing and Director in Residence, Bell Shakespeare
- Alexander Lewis – musical theatre actor with New York's Metropolitan Opera and The Juilliard School
- Ben Lewis – actor portraying the Phantom in the Australian production of Andrew Lloyd Webber's Love Never Dies
- Charles Mesure (1982–1987) – actor in Hercules: The Legendary Journeys, Xena: Warrior Princess and Outrageous Fortune
- Maurice Parker (1969–1979) – presenter in Simon Townsend's Wonder World and television producer
- Jeremy Lindsay Taylor (1983–1991) – actor in Heartbreak High, Something in the Air and Sea Patrol
- Andrew Tighe (1964–1973) – theatre director and actor for the Sydney Theatre Company
- Sandy Winton (1983–1988) – actor playing Michael Williams in Neighbours
- Darren Yap (1980–1985) – theatre director, actor and associate director for the Sydney 2000 Olympic Ceremonies

=== Visual arts ===
- Leslie Board (1893–1896) – artist represented in the AGNSW and chief scenic designer of J.C. Williamson's
- Simon Fieldhouse (1963) – artist
- Rogey Foley (aka Ellis D Fogg) (1957–1959) – Lumino kinetic sculptor
- Frank Hinder AM (1916–1918) – Blake Prize winning artist
- Hal Holman OL OAM (1932) – former senior artist for Papua New Guinea and designer of the National Crest
- Mervyn Horton AM (1930–1935) – founding editor of Art in Australia
- Greg Louden (2000–2006) – Academy Award-winning visual effects artist
- Dave Morley (1982–1991) – AACTA Award winning visual effects artist
- Simon Penny (1968–1973) – interactive media artist
- Andrew Stark (1976–1981) – street photographer and author
- Quinton Tidswell (1923–1924) — artist known for his architectural works on paper
- Graeme Townsend (1963–1970) — artist who uses wildlife as an inspiration

=== Literature ===
- Professor Leslie Allen (1894–1899) – former professor of English at the Royal Military College, Duntroon, Chairman Literature Censorship Board and poet
- John Gunn (1937) – winner of the Children's Book of the Year Award: Older Readers
- Will Kostakis (1995–2006) – Sydney Morning Herald Young Writer of the Year
- Leslie Alfred Redgrave (1899–1902) – novelist and non-fiction writer

=== Journalism and other writing ===
- Malcolm Brown (1963–1964) – crime writer and former Sydney Morning Herald journalist
- Peter Charley (1973–1974) – Walkley Award-winning executive producer for Al Jazeera North American investigative unit
- Patrick Cook (1962–1967) – satirist, cartoonist and AFI Award winning screenwriter
- W. Leslie Curnow (1882–1886) – journalist with the Sydney Morning Herald and the London Times and Spiritualist
- Graham Davis (1966–1971) – Walkley and Logie Award-winning investigative journalist
- Barry Divola (1972–1977) – rock and roll journalist and Sydney Morning Herald columnist
- Charles Brunsdon Fletcher – former editor of the Sydney Morning Herald
- Benjamin Genocchio (1981–1986) – former Art critic for the New York Times
- Greg Haddrick (1973–1978) – Logie and AWGIE Award-winning screenwriter, TV producer and creator of Underbelly
- Peter Holder (1974–1982) – journalist and managing director of Daily Mail Australia
- Christian Jantzen (1986–1995) – 2UE presenter
- Greg Jennett (1985–1986) – ABC Television political correspondent and presenter of Capital Hill ABC News 24
- Tony Jones (1970–1974) – Walkley Award-winning host of Lateline and Q & A on ABC TV
- Christopher Lee (1962–1964) – AFI Award and AWGIE Award-winning screenwriter of Secret Life of Us
- David McGonigal (1966–1967) – polar regions writer and photographer
- Warwick Moss (1958–1965) – actor, television personality, and New South Wales Premier's Literary Award winning writer
- Sydney Elliott Napier (1882–1885) – writer, poet & lawyer
- Nick Olle (1990–1995) – journalist, producer Dateline on SBS TV'
- Max Solling OAM (1955–1959) – urban and sports historian
- Frank Walker Snr (1934–1936) – journalist and author
- Frank Walker Jnr (1967–1972) – author and journalist
- Mark Whittaker (1978–1983) – author and Walkley Award-winning journalist for The Australian

=== Musicians and composers ===
- Keith Asboe (1945) – organist and composer
- Matt Bruce (2002–2007) – violinist and concertmaster of the Australian Brandenburg Orchestra
- Thomas Champion (2002–2007) – member of The Preatures
- Tobias Cole (1976–1988) – countertenor
- Duncan Gifford (1985–1990) – international award-winning concert pianist
- David Hansen – countertenor
- Graham Lowndes (1958–1961) – singer and songwriter of Mouthmusic and Survival's a Song.
- Brett McKern (1981–1990) – organist and composer
- Jack Moffitt (2002–2007) – member of The Preatures
- James Olds (1998–2003) – bass-baritone
- David Rumsey (1947–1955) – organist and composer
- Alan Sandow (1964–1968) – Sherbet drummer
- Stephen Rae (1972–1979) – AFI Award-winning film and TV musician and composer
- Gary Shearston (1950–1955) – Australia's best selling folk singer
- Lyndon Watts (1992–1993) – principal bassoonist at the Munich Philharmonic

== Architects and engineers ==
- Arthur Anderson (1881–1883) – founder and first president of the Federal Council of the Australian Institute of Architects
- Ken Branch (1920–1925) – architect in partnership with David Gillespie
- Andrew Benn (1988–1993) – 2014 Architecture Award NSW Australian Institute of Architects
- Henry Budden CBE (1886–1888) – Sir John Sulman Medal winning architect
- Hedley Norman Carr (1921–1922) – Royal British Institute of Architects bronze medal-winning architect
- Douglas Gardiner (1918–1922) – partner in Bates Smart & McCutcheon
- Carlyle Greenwell (1897–1901) – partner in Kent Budden & Greenwell
- William Hardwick (1873–1877) – former Principal Architect (Western Australia)
- Eric Heath – architect of the former Plaza Theatre, Sydney
- Edward Hewlett Hogben (1889–1891) – architect of Leuralla and the 1911 frontage of the Carrington Hotel, Katoomba
- Archer Hoskings (1881–1883) – Sydney, London, Perth and Johannesburg based architect
- Harry Jefferis (1883–1885) – Western Australian architect
- Peter Kaad (1911–1914) – designer of the Rural Bank Building, Martin Place
- Alan Nangle (1924–1926) – architect of the War Memorial Chapel at Trinity Grammar School Summer Hill
- William Monks (1883–1885) – Southern NSW architect
- Alex Popov (1958–1960) – Wilkinson Award and Robin Boyd Award winning Architect
- Edwin Sautelle (1886–1892) – engineer who designed the suspension bridge at Parsley Bay and the stone gates at South Head General Cemetery
- Colin Still (1950–1960) – Sir John Sulman Medal winning Architect
- Lord Livingstone Ramsay (1882–1885) – active in the northern suburbs of Sydney and in the RAS and President of Hornsby Shire
- Stanley Rickard (1899–1900) – Sydney and Los Angeles-based architect
- Thomas Tidswell (1881–1886) – designer of the Lyne Park Harbour Baths, Rose Bay
- Colonel Alfred Warden (1884–1887) – soldier, military engineer and architect
- William Hardy Wilson (1893–1897) – architect, artist and author

=== Buildings designed by Old Newingtonian architects ===
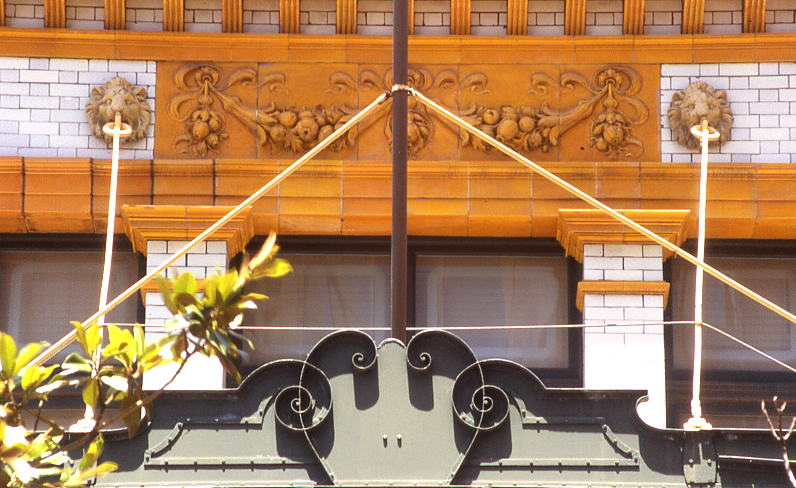
Former Mark Foy's Building, Liverpool Street, Sydney, designed by Arthur Anderson

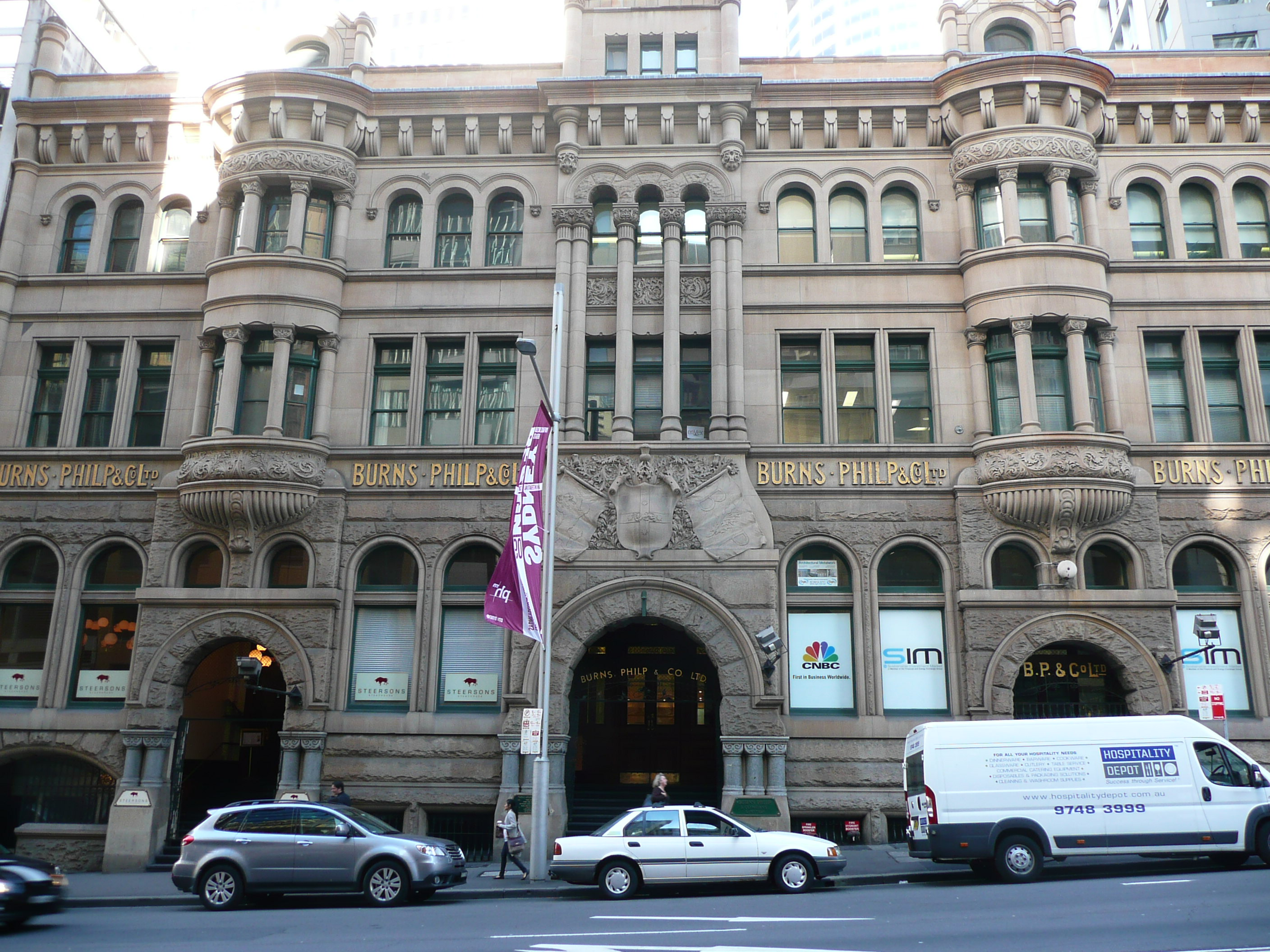
Former Burns Philp Building, Sydney, designed by Arthur Anderson

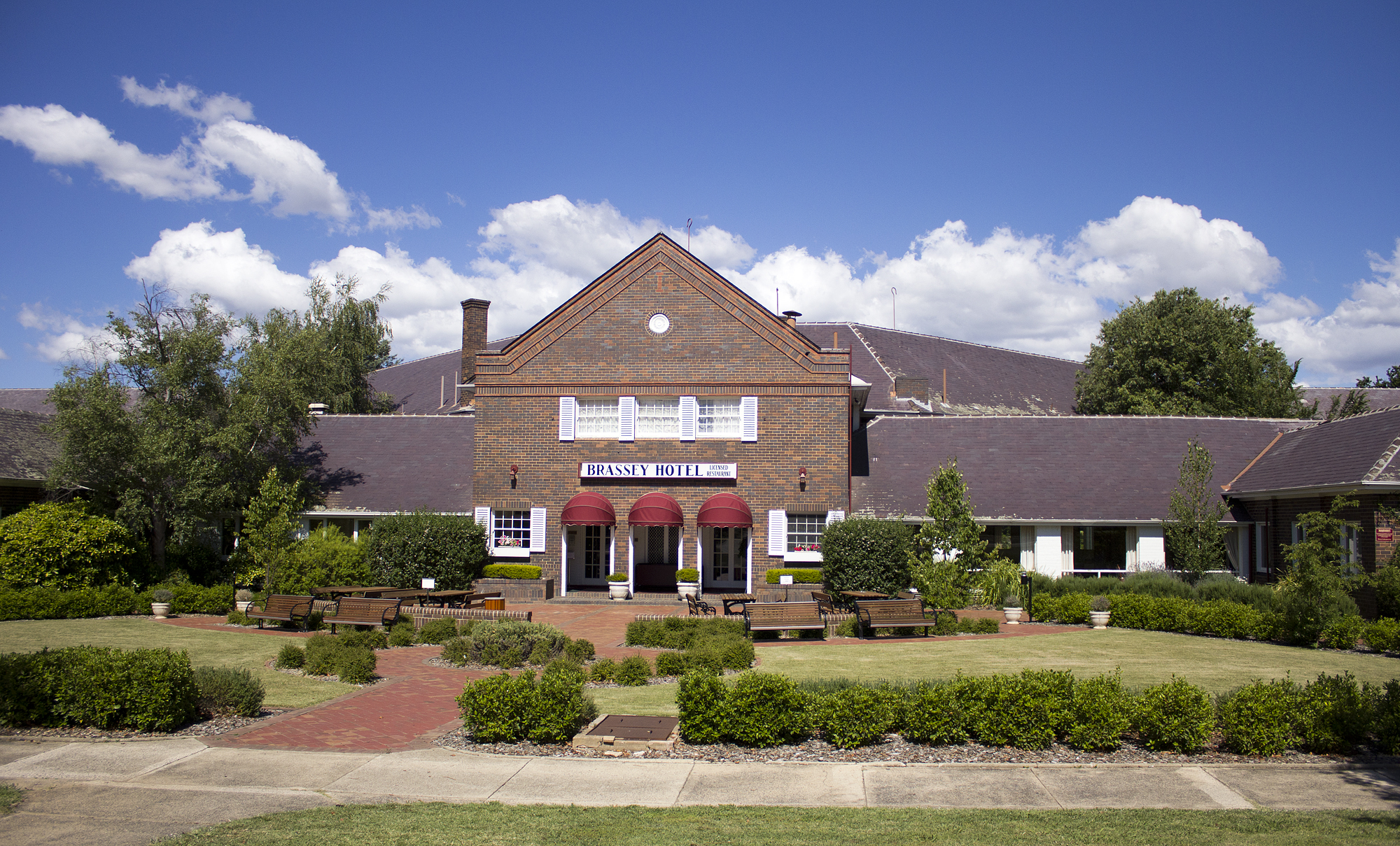
Brassey Hotel, Barton, Australian Capital Territory designed by Henry Budden

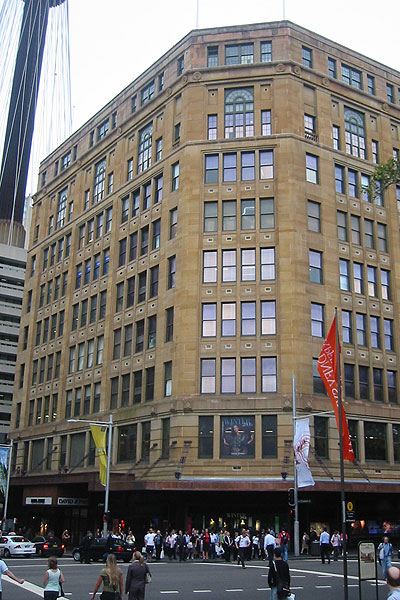
David Jones, Elizabeth Street, Sydney, designed Henry Budden

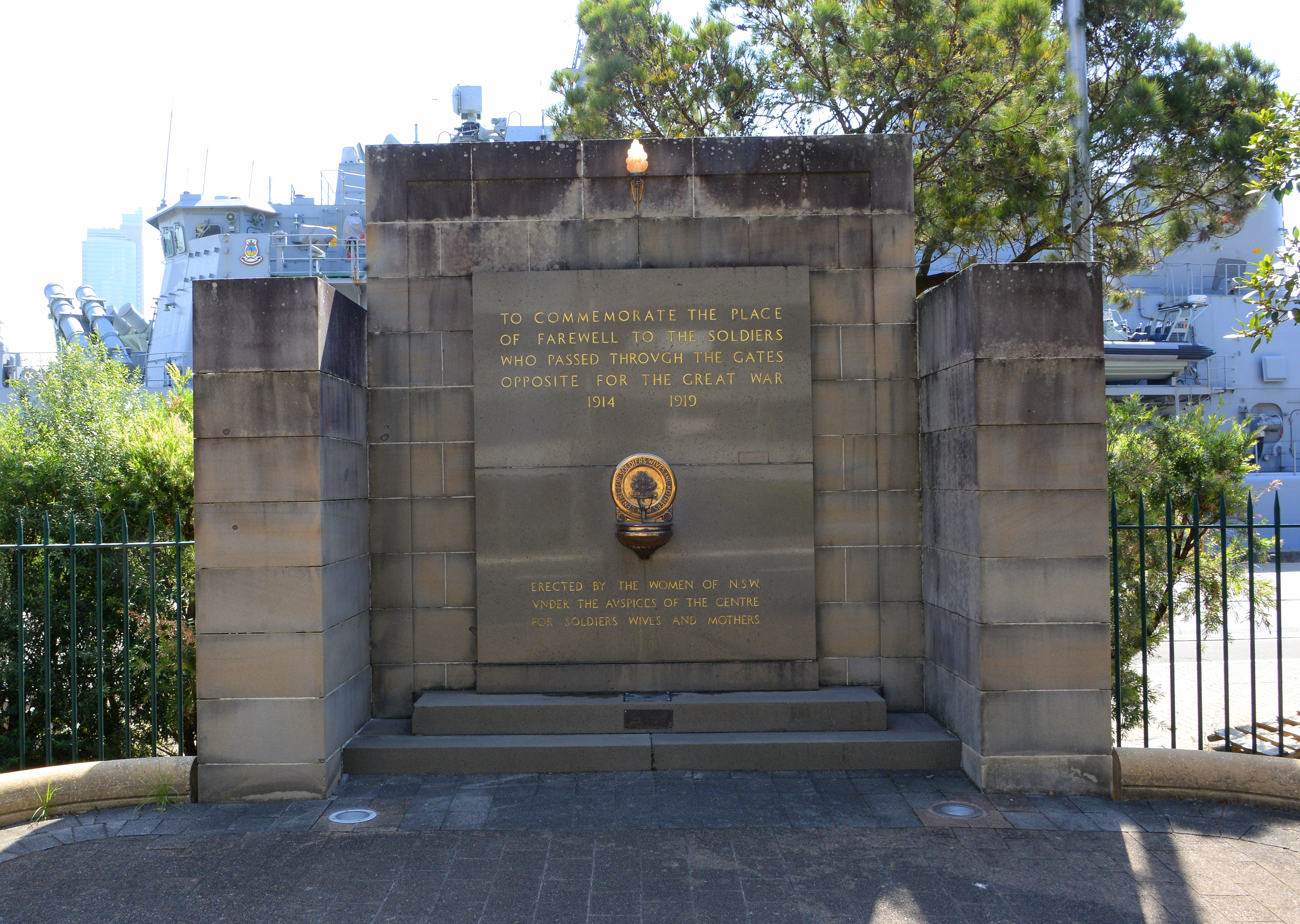
Mothers and Wives Memorial to Soldiers, Woolloomooloo designed by Budden and Greenwell

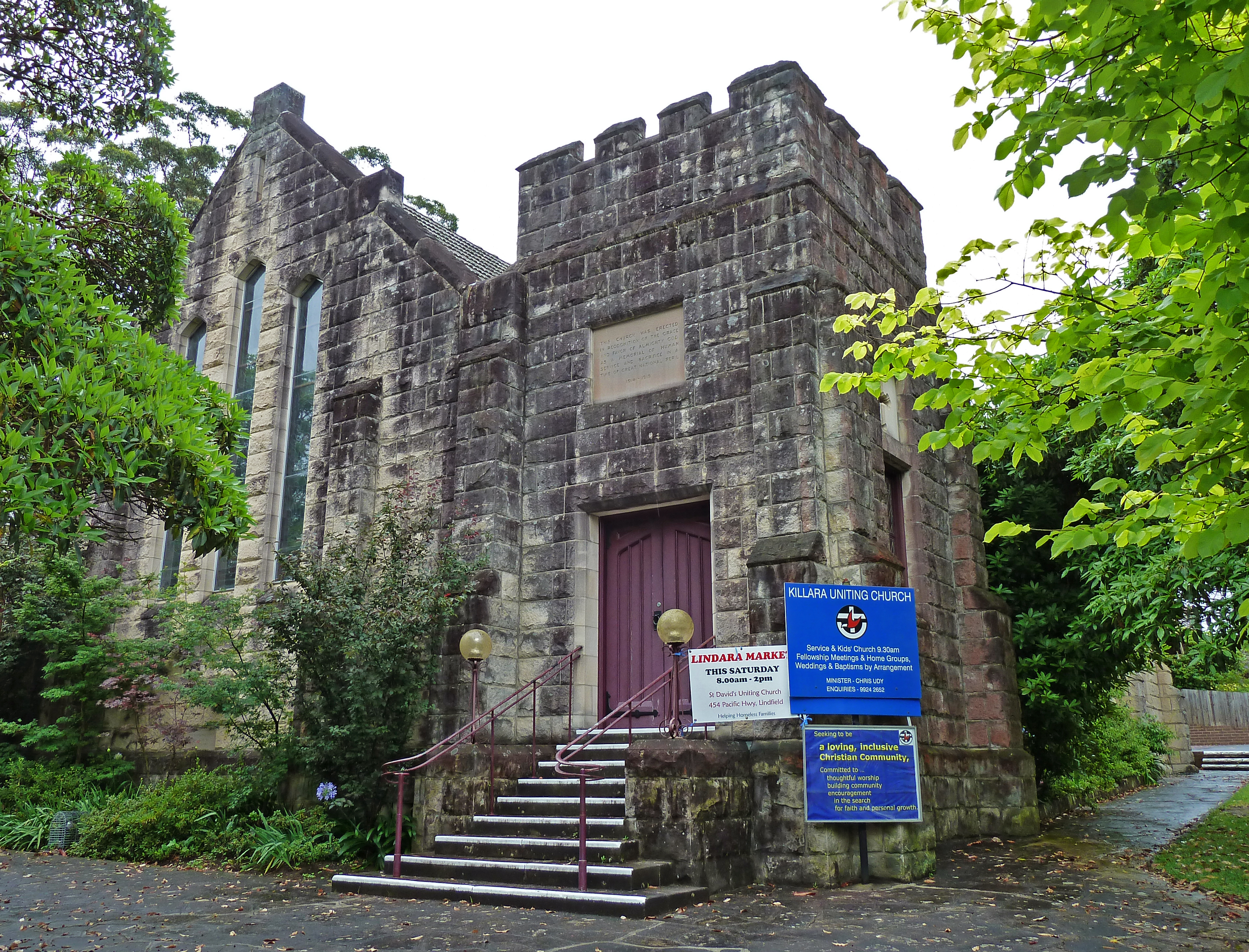
Killara Uniting Church designed by Carlyle Greenwell

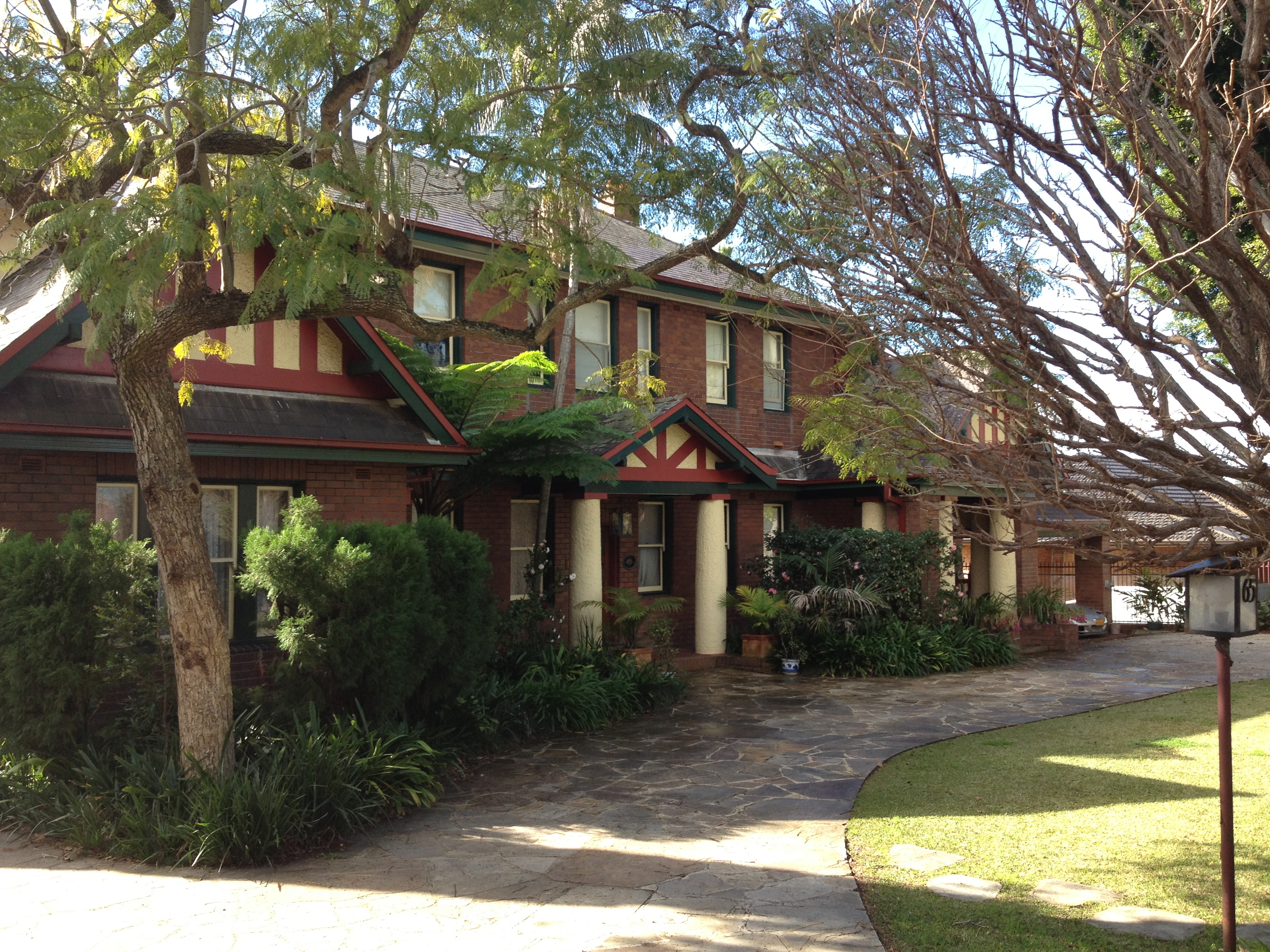
65 Woodside Avenue, Strathfield, designed by Carlyle Greenwell

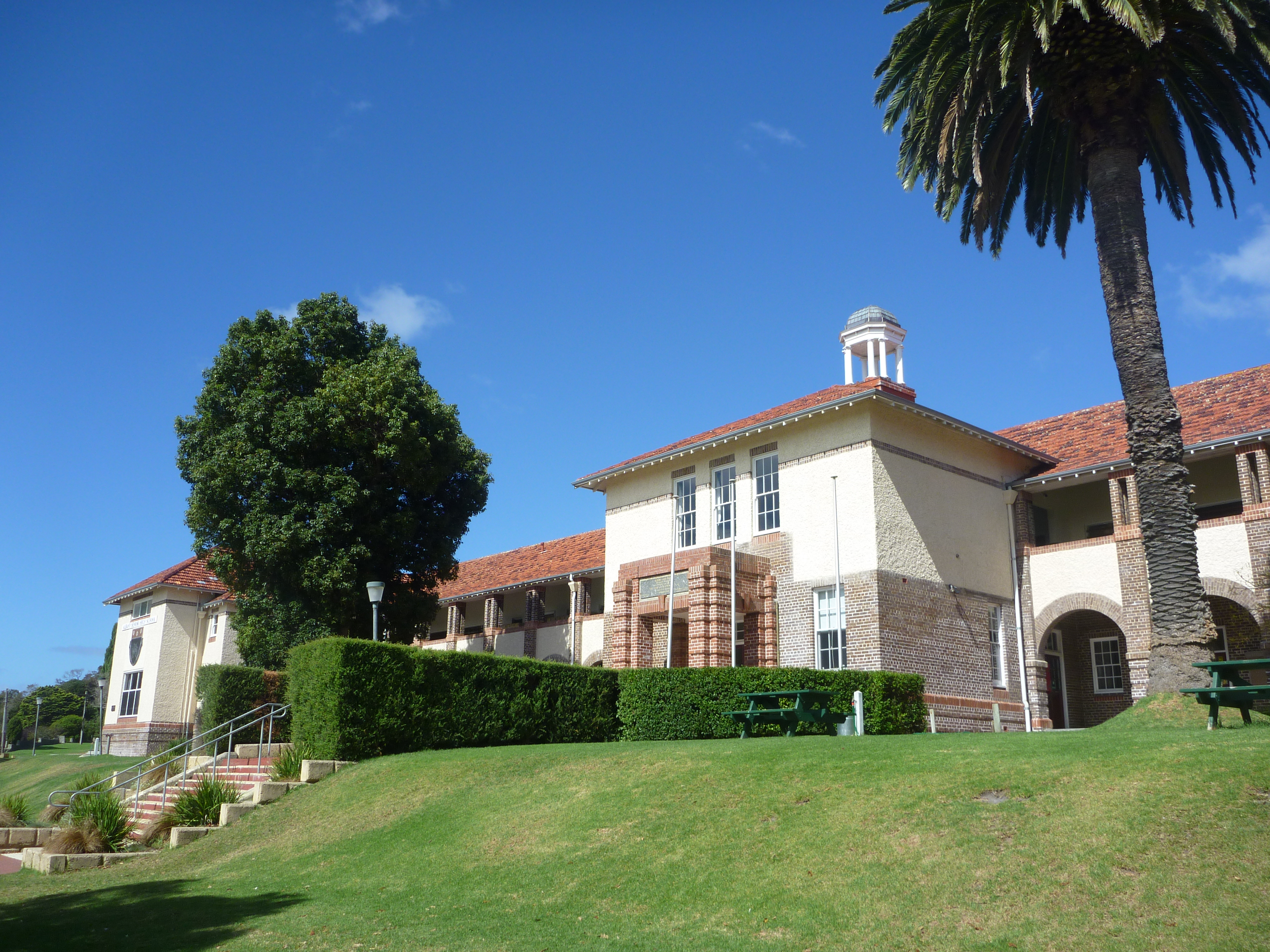
Albany Senior High School, Western Australia designed by William Hardwick

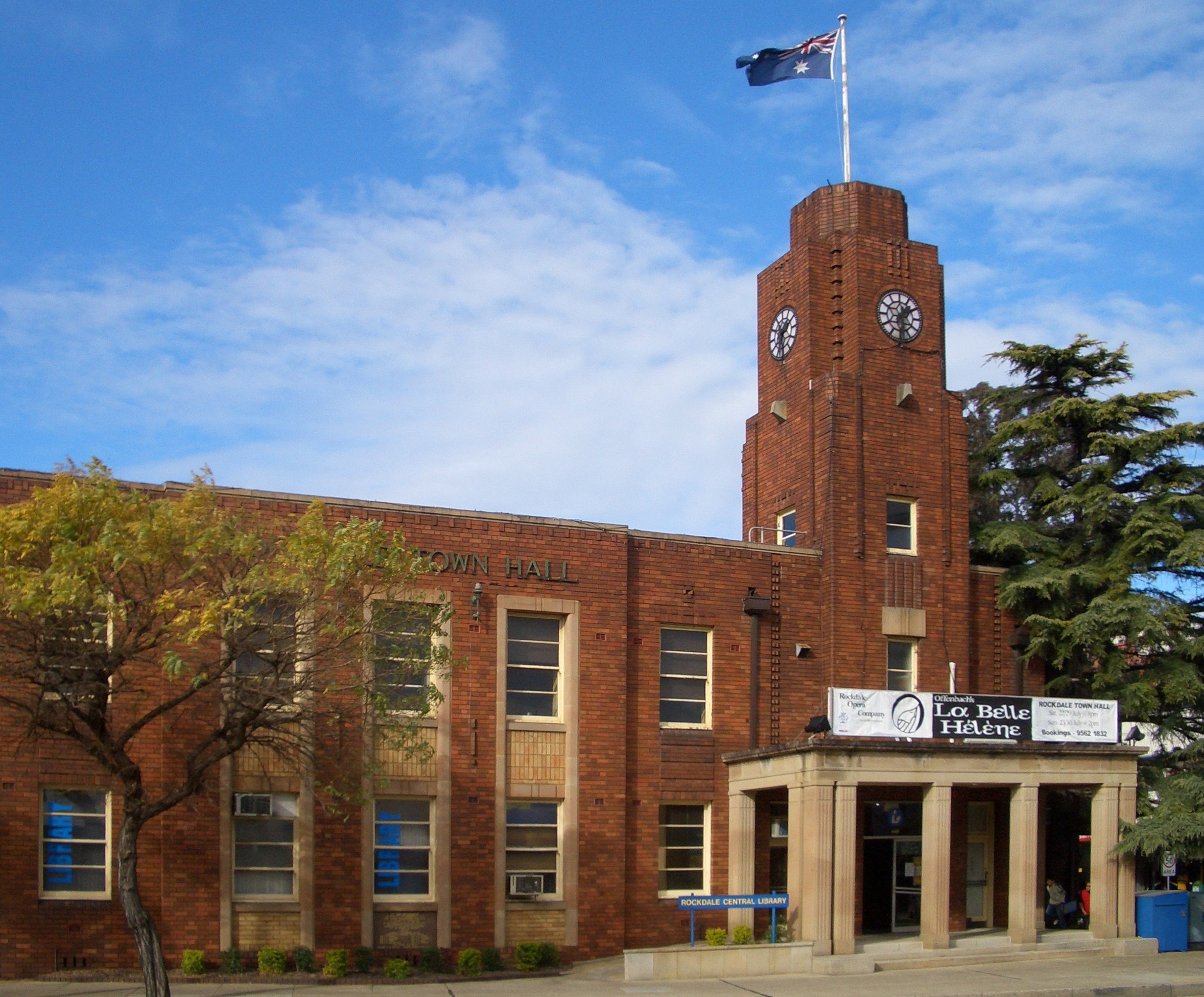
Rockdale Town Hall designed by Douglas Gardiner

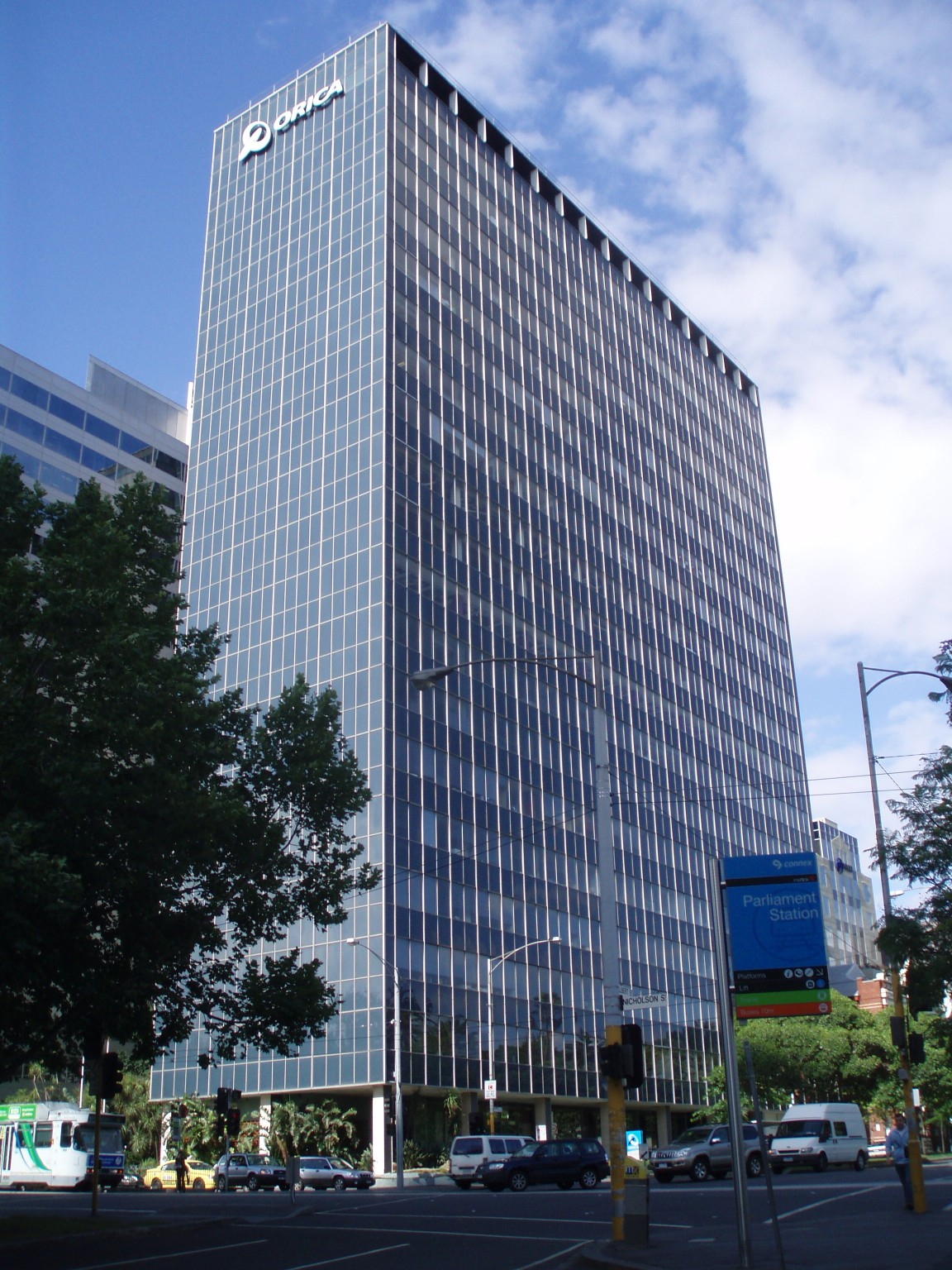
Orica House, Melbourne, detail and documentation by Douglas Gardiner

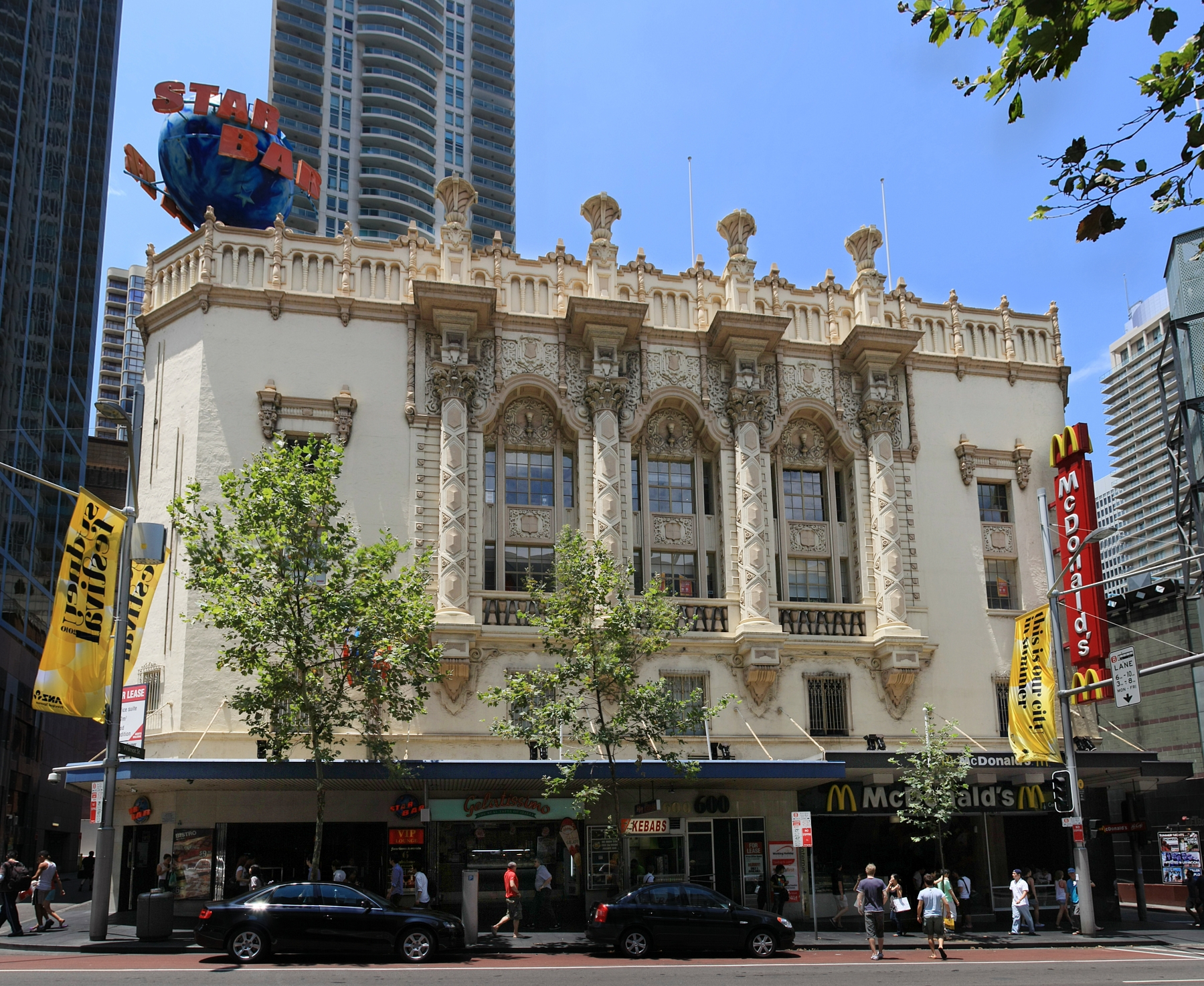
Former Plaza Theatre, Sydney, designed by Eric Heath

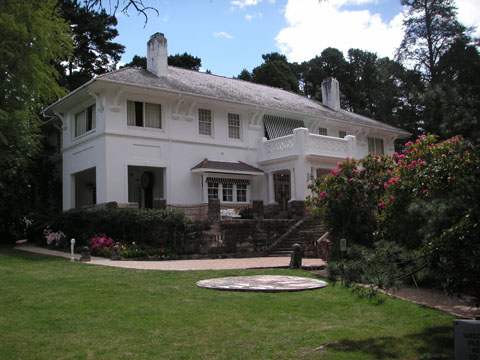
Leuralla, Leura designed by Edward Hewlett Hogben

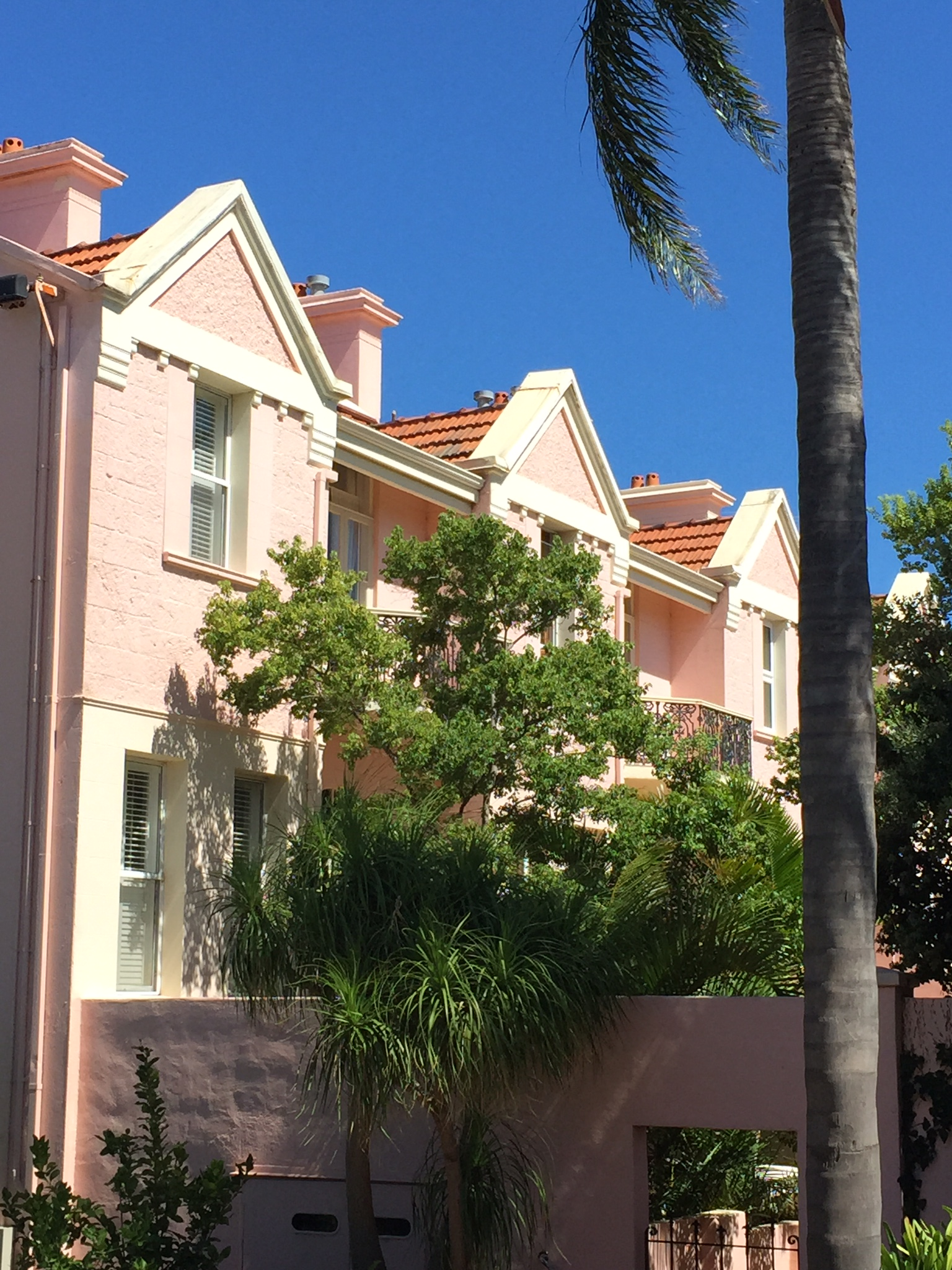
Matheson's Terrace Claremont designed by Archer Hoskings

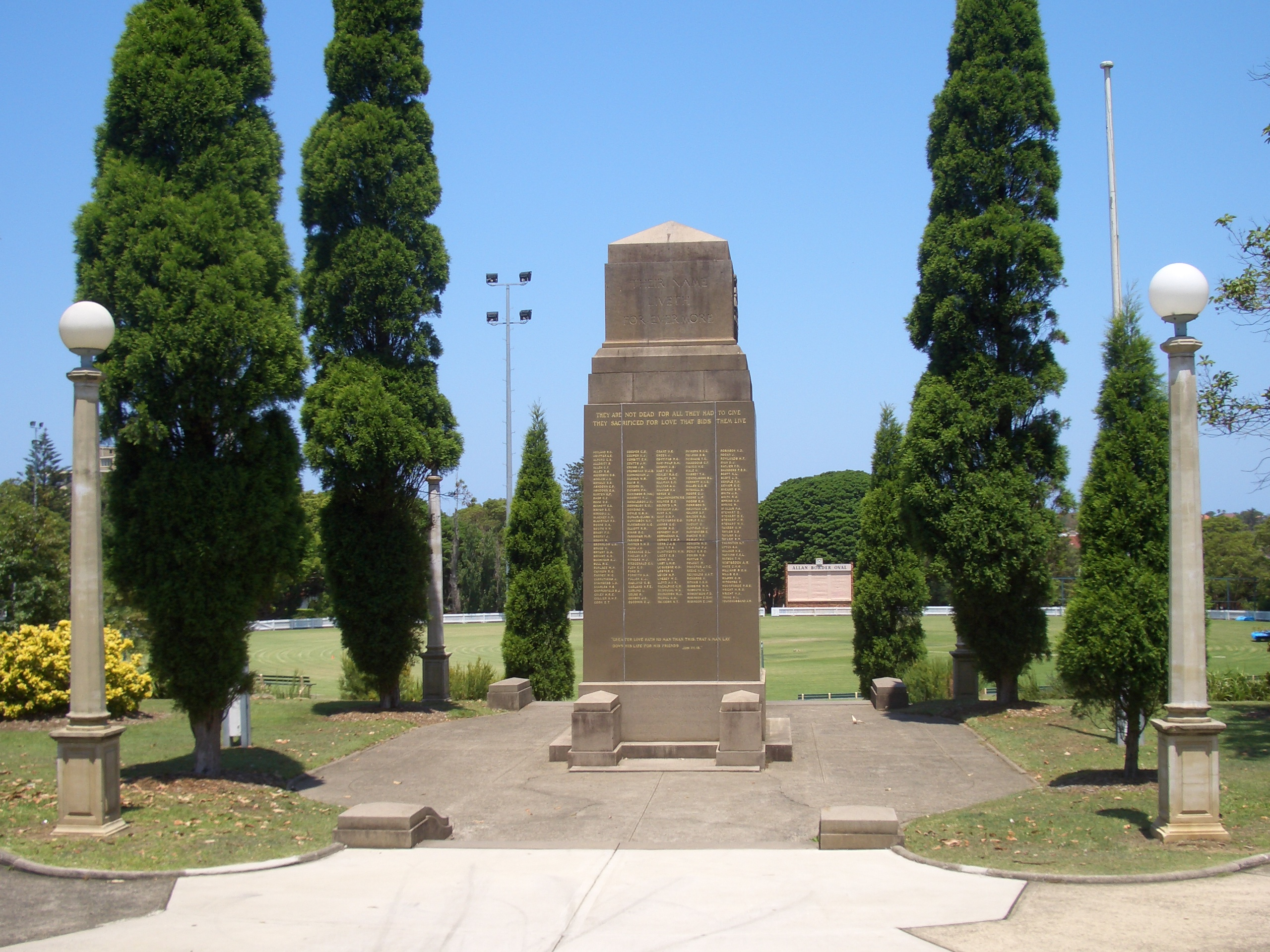
Mosman War Memorial, Allan Border Oval, Mosman designed by Peter Kaad

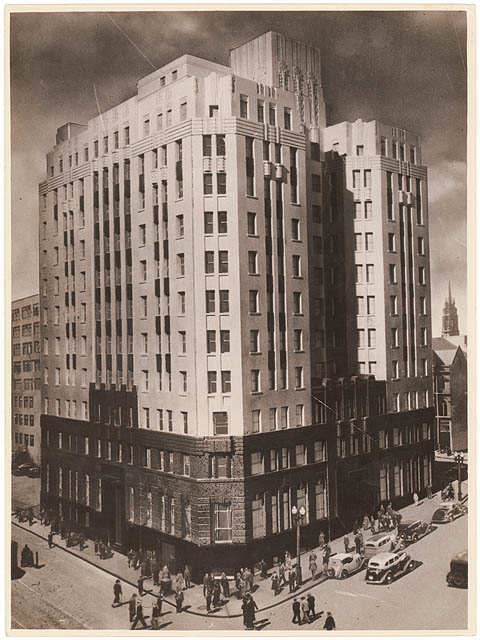
Rural Bank Building, Martin Place, designed by Peter Kaad

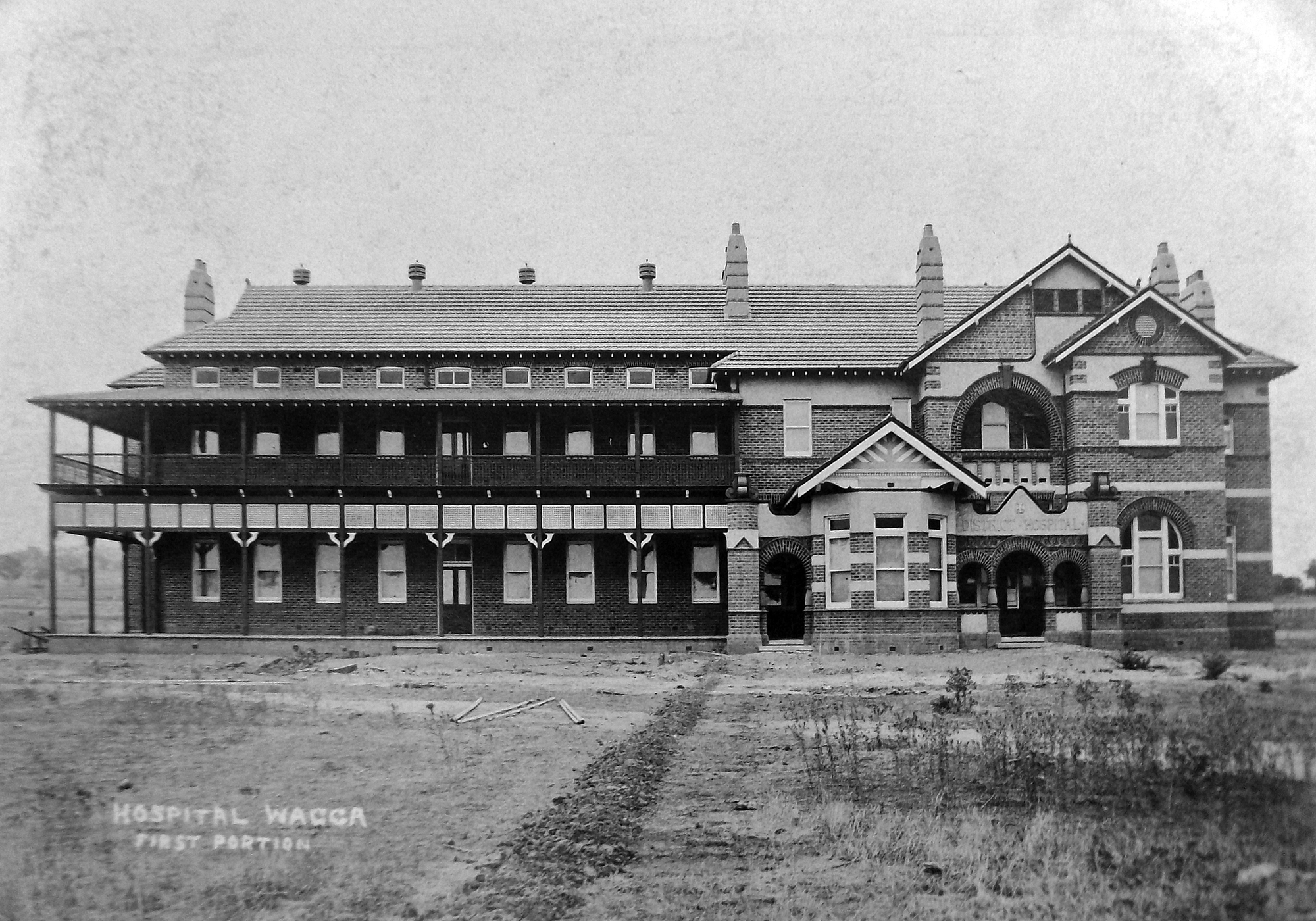
Wagga Wagga District Hospital, Nurses quarters and kitchens, designed by William Monks

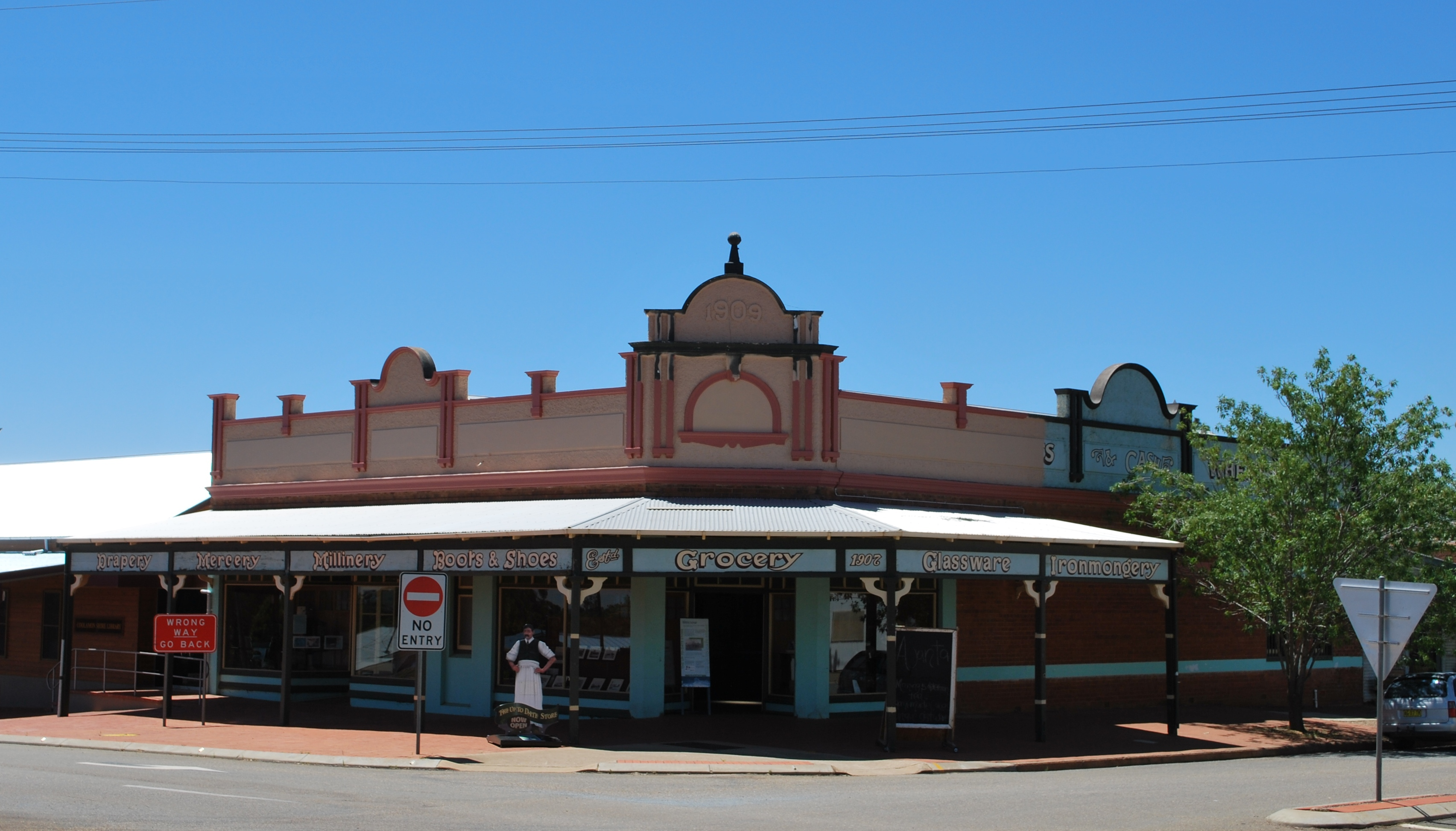
Up-To-Date Store, Coolamon, designed by William Monks

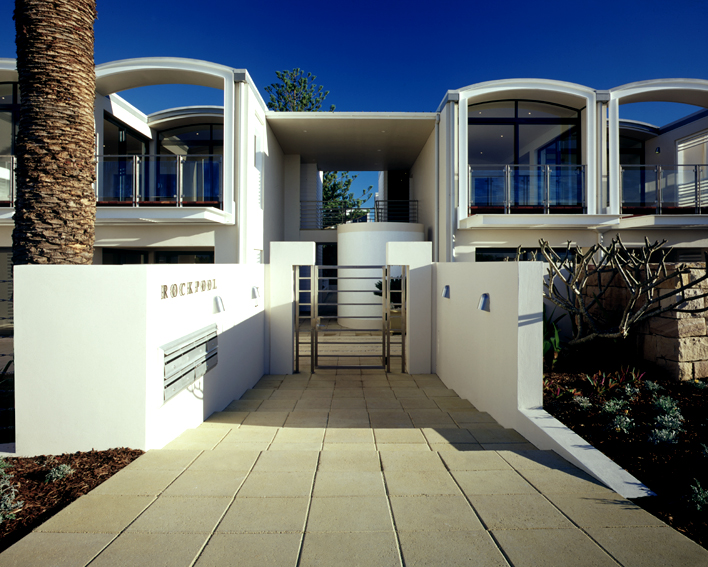
Rockpool Apartments, Mona Vale, designed by Alex Popov

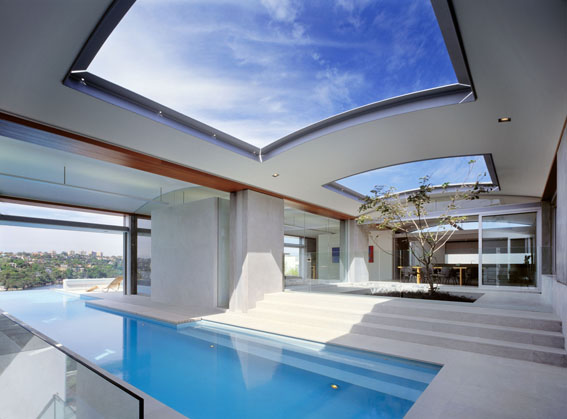
House, Northbridge, designed by Alex Popov

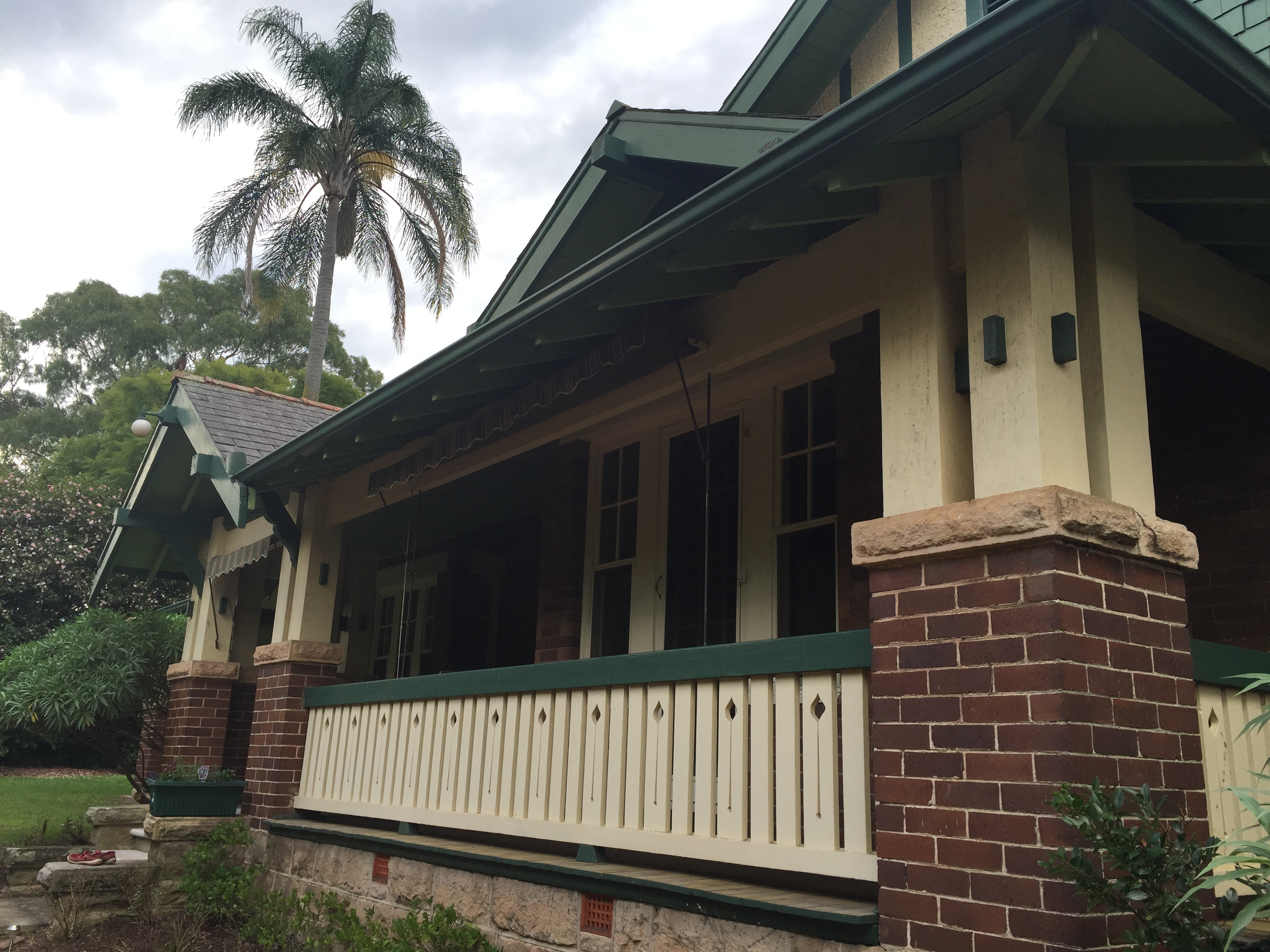
Vessey house Epping designed by Lord Livingstone Ramsay

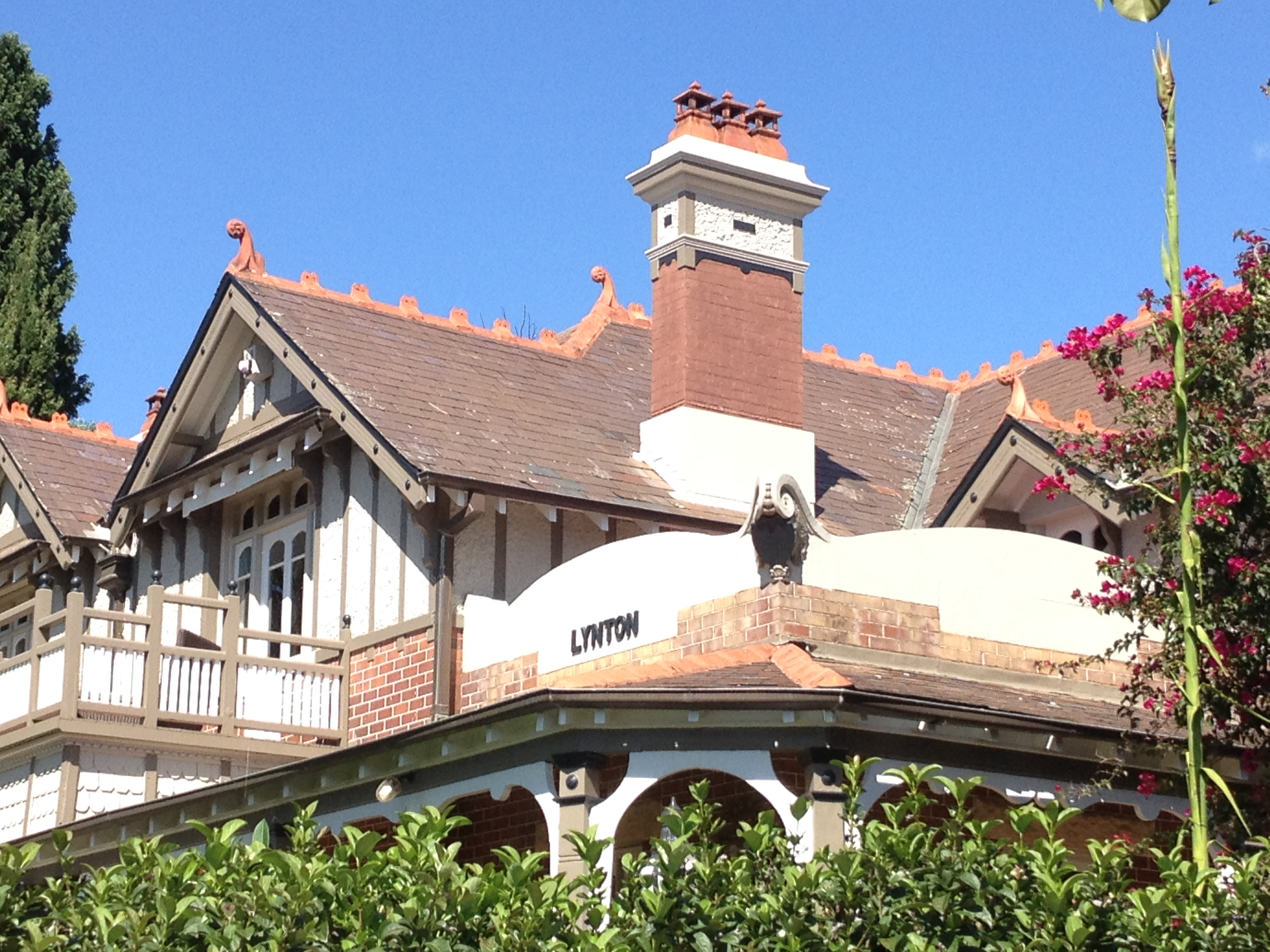
Lynton, Burwood, designed by Stanley Rickard

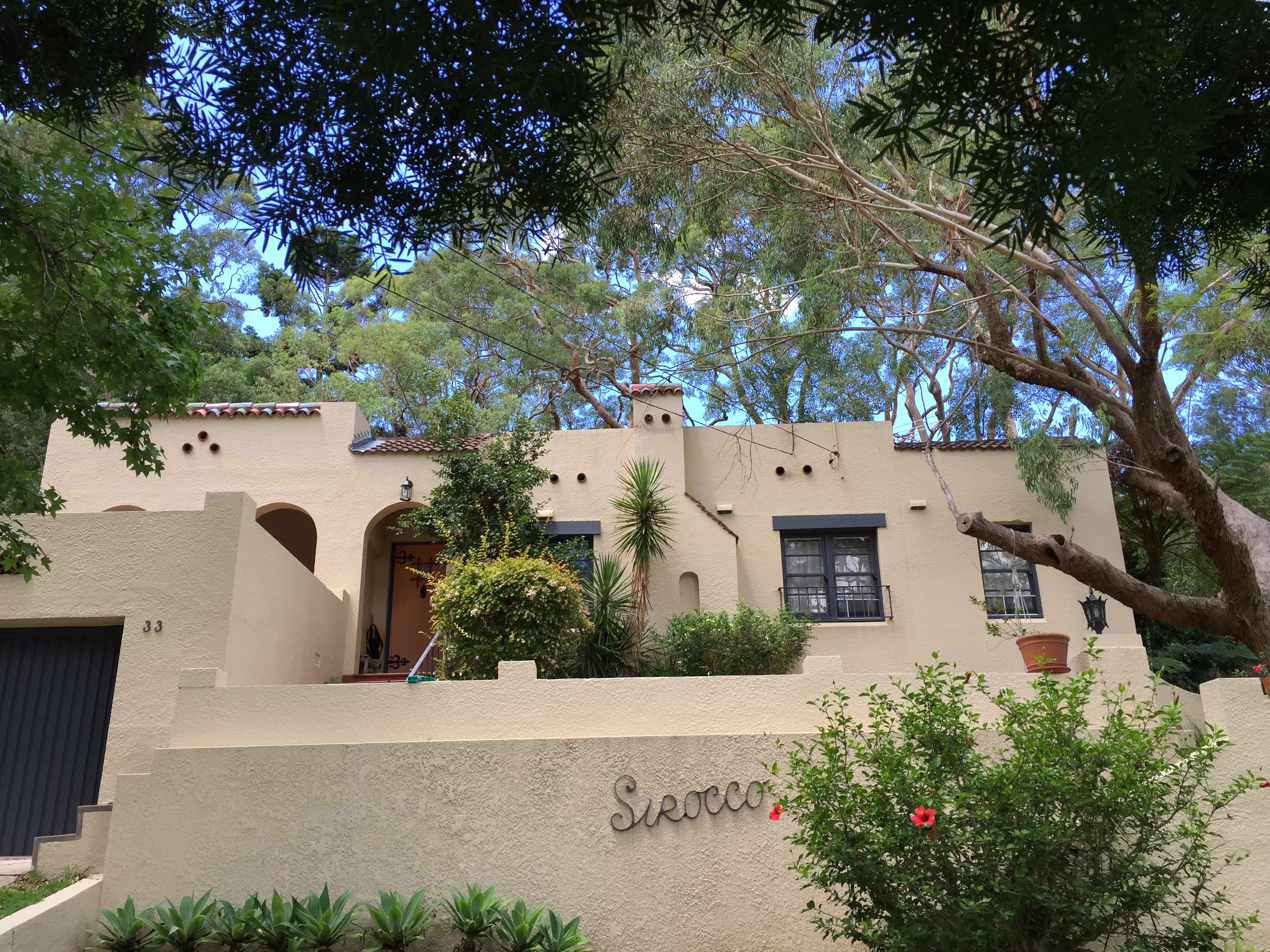
Sirocco, Roseville, designed by Stanley Rickard

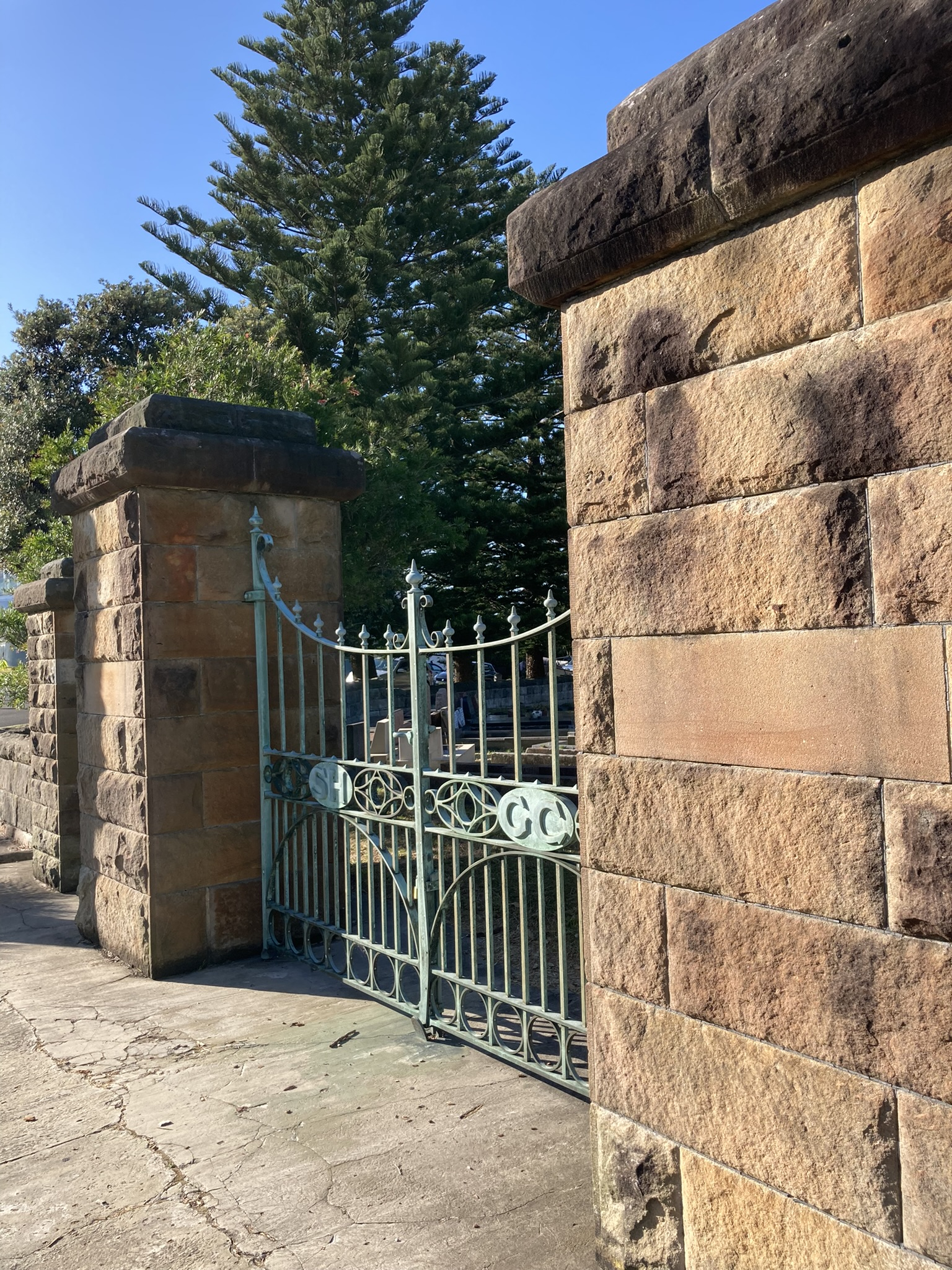
Stone Gates South Head General Cemetery designed Edwin Sautelle

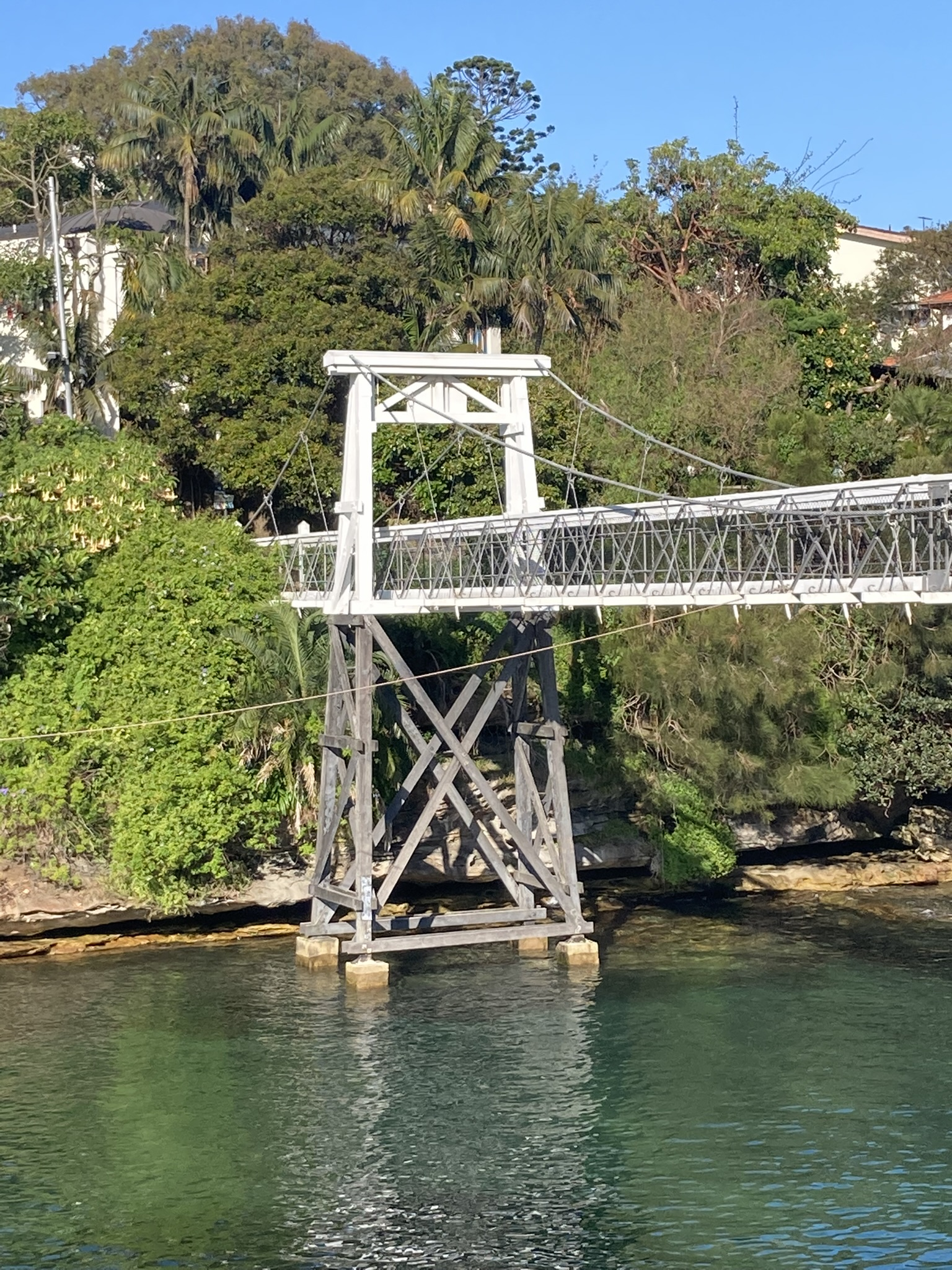
Parsely Bay suspension bridge, Vauclse designed by Edwin Sautelle

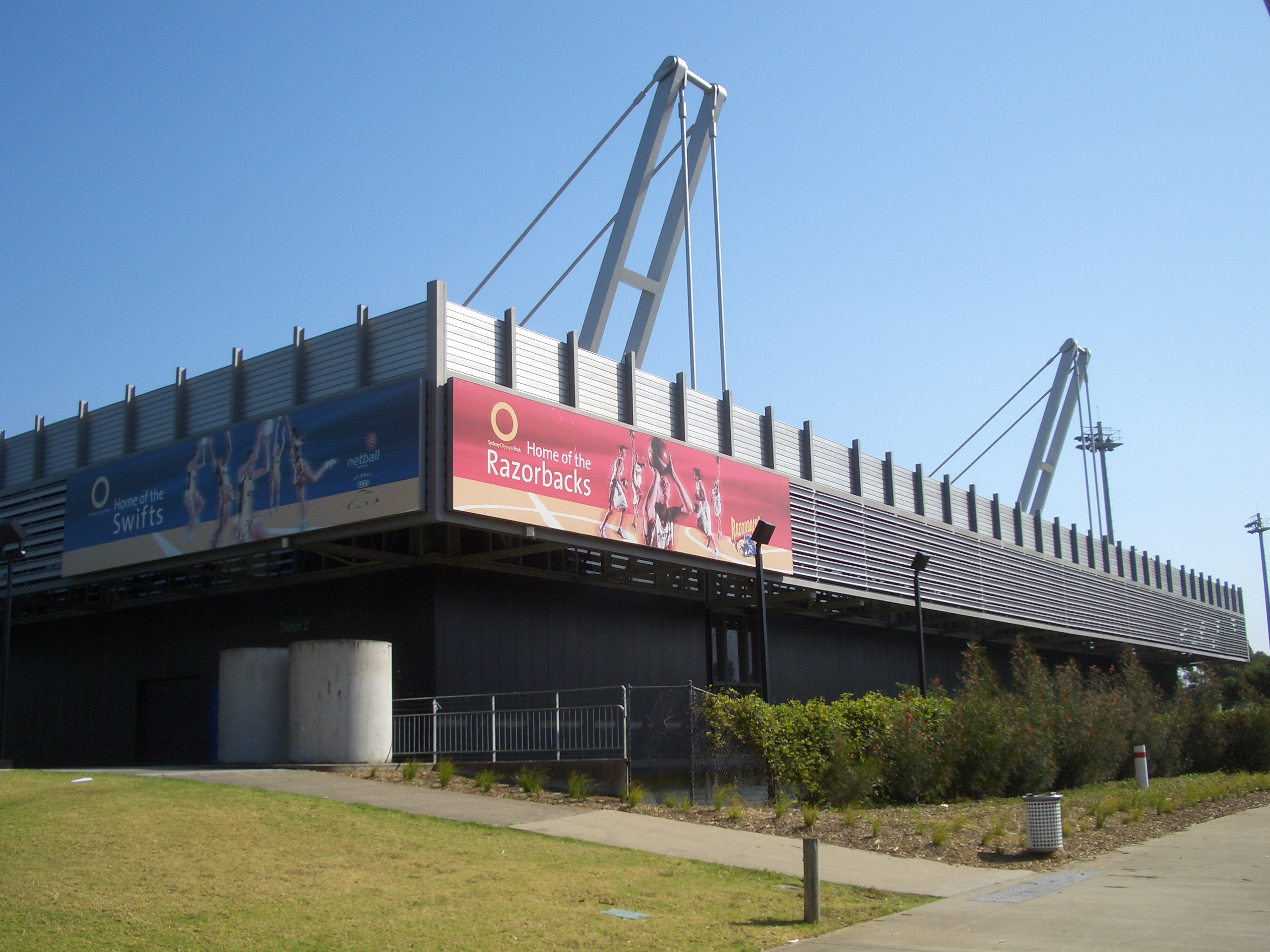
State Sports Centre, Sydney Olympic Park designed by Colin Still

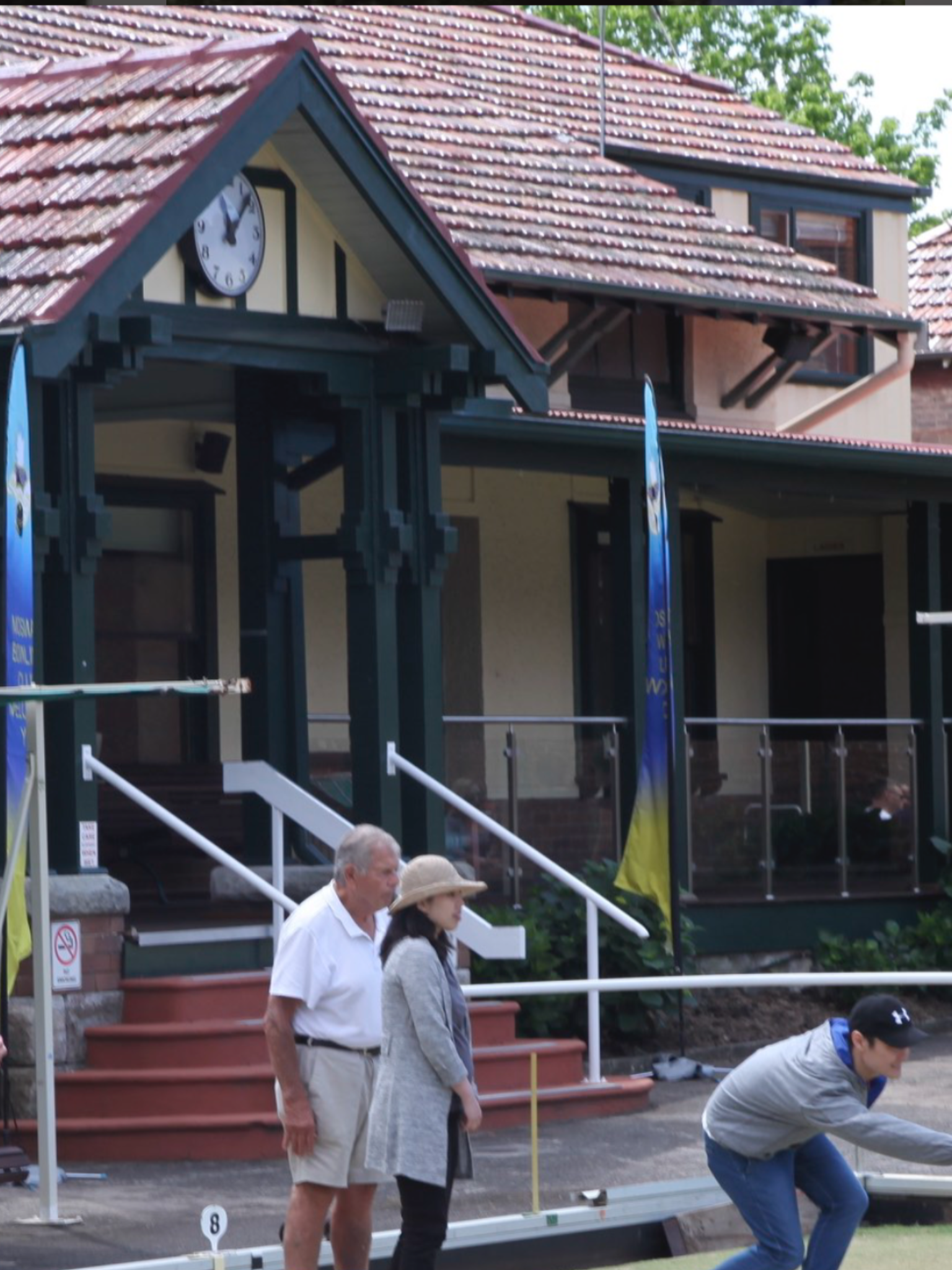
Mosman Bowing Club was designed by Thomas Tidswell

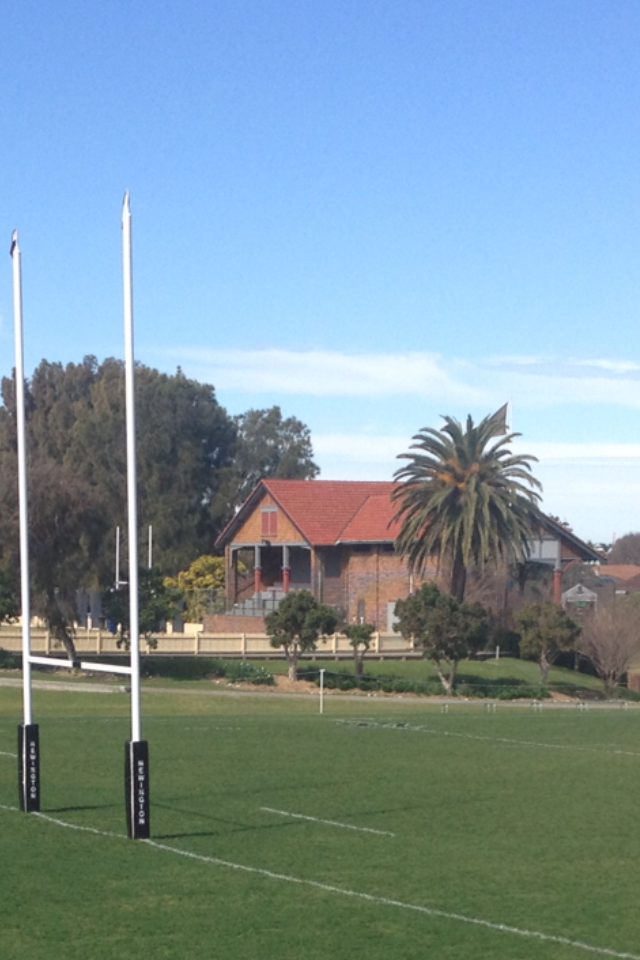
Glasson Pavilion, Newington College, Stanmore, designed by Alfred Warden

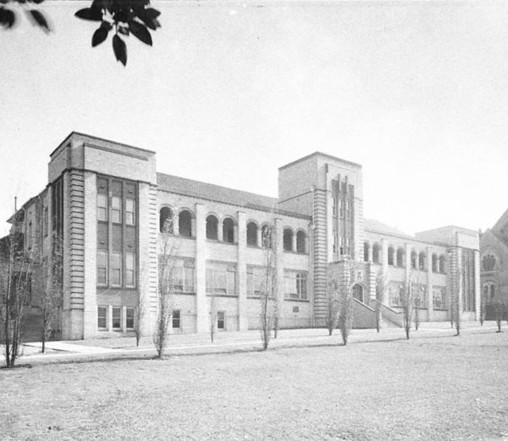
Former Wyvern House, Stanmore, designed by Alfred Warden

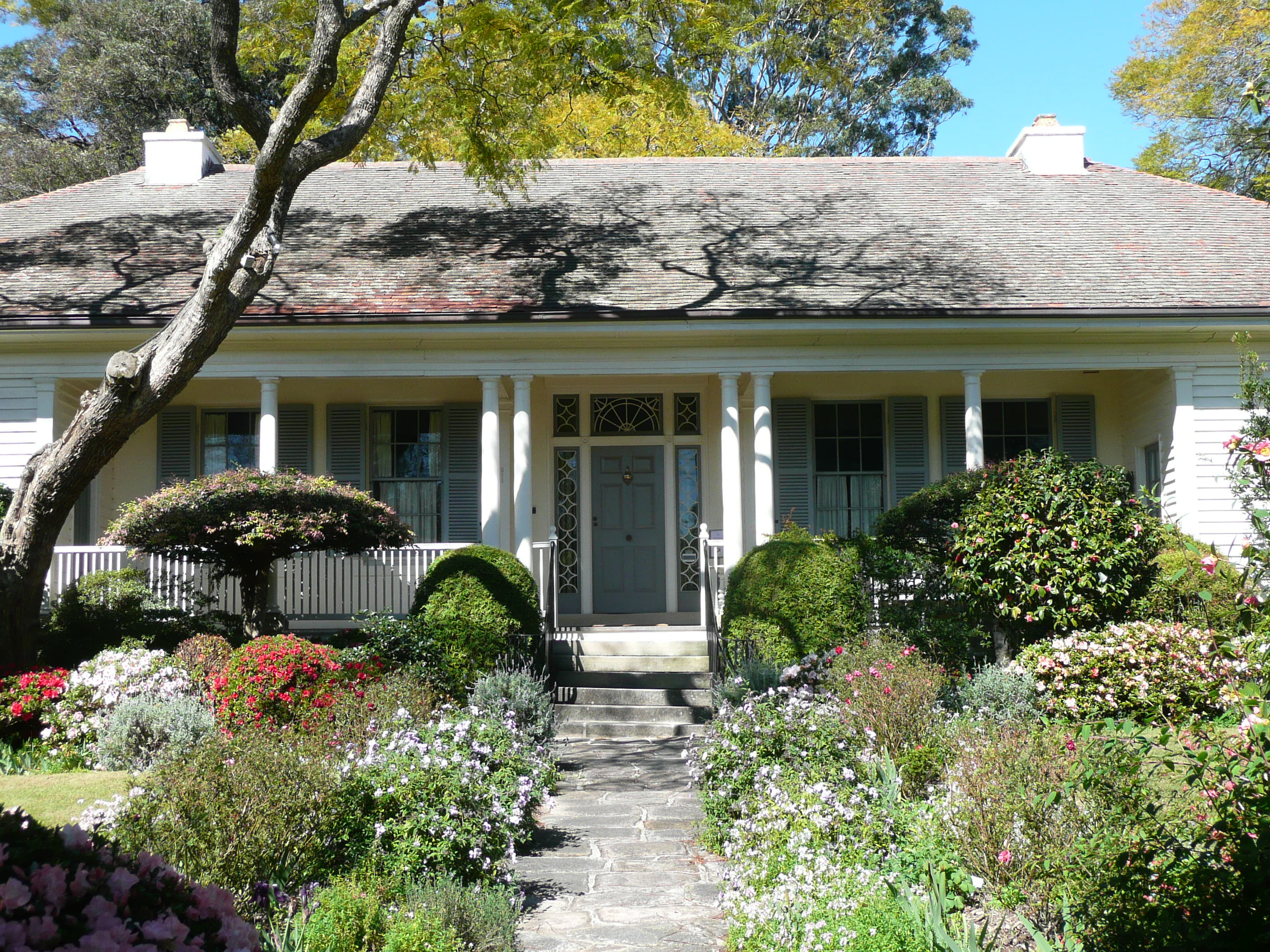
Eryldene, Gordon, designed by William Hardy Wilson

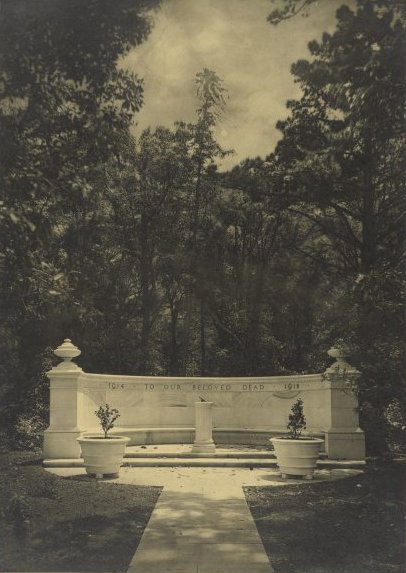
War Memorial, Newington College, Stanmore, designed by William Hardy Wilson

== See also ==
- Newington College
