= Gideon Haigh bibliography =

List of the published work of Gideon Haigh, Australian journalist, cricket writer, and historian.

== Books ==
=== Works on cricket ===
Year	Title	Publisher	ISBN	Notes
1993	The Cricket War: the Inside Story of Kerry Packer's World Series Cricket	Text Publishing	ISBN 1863720278	
1994	The Border Years	Text Publishing	ISBN 1875847065	
1995	One Summer Every Summer: An Ashes Journal	Text Publishing	ISBN 1875847189	
1996	On Top Down Under: the Story of Australia's Cricket Captains	Wakefield Press	ISBN 1862543879	Revised and updated edition of the original edition by Ray Robinson, published by Cassell Australia in 1975.
1996	Gideon Haigh's Australian Cricket Anecdotes	Oxford University Press	ISBN 0195539362	Editor
1997	The Summer Game: Australian Test Cricket 1949-71	Text Publishing	ISBN 1875847448	
1999	Mystery Spinner: the Story of Jack Iverson	Text Publishing	ISBN 1876485205	
1999	Wisden Cricketers' Almanack Australia 1999-2000	John Wisden & Co	ISBN 1864980621	Editor
2000	Wisden Cricketers' Almanack Australia 2000-2001	Hardie Grant Books	ISBN 1876719338	Editor
2001	The Big Ship: Warwick Armstrong and the Making of Modern Cricket	Text Publications	ISBN 1876485981	
2002	Many a Slip: a Diary of a Club Cricket Season	Aurum Press	ISBN 1854108719	
2002	The Vincibles: a Suburban Cricket Odyssey	Text Publishing	ISBN 1877008354	
2002	Endless Summer: 140 Years of Australian Cricket in Wisden	Hardie Grant Books	ISBN 1740660099	Editor
2004	Game for Anything: Writings on Cricket	Black Inc.		
2005	Ashes 2005: the Full Story of the Test Series	Aurum Press	ISBN 184513138X	
2006	Peter the Lord's Cat: and Other Unexpected Obituaries from Wisden	Aurum Press	ISBN 1845131630	Editor
2006	The Book of Ashes Anecdotes	Mainstream	ISBN 1845962575	Editor
2006	Silent Revolutions: Writings on Cricket History	Black Inc.	ISBN 9781863953108	
2007	All Out: the Ashes 2006-07	Black Inc.	ISBN 9781863953900	
2007	Inside Story: Unlocking Australia's Cricket Archives	Cricket Australia	ISBN 9781921116001	With David Frith
2007	Parachutist at Fine Leg: and Other Unusual Occurrences from Wisden	Aurum Press	ISBN 9781845132569	Editor
2008	Inside Out: Writings on Cricket Culture	Globe Press	ISBN 0522855539	
2009	The Ultimate Test: the Story of the 2009 Ashes Series	Aurum Press	ISBN 9781845134495	
2011	Out of the Runnings: the 2010-11 Ashes Series	Viking	ISBN 9780670076017	
2012	On Warne	Viking	ISBN 9780670076604	
2013	Uncertain Corridors: Writings on Modern Cricket	Penguin	ISBN 174348352X	
2014	Ashes to Ashes: How Australia Came Back and England Came Unstuck, 2013-14	Simon and Schuster	ISBN 9781471131738	
2016	Stroke of Genius: Victor Trumper and the Shot That Changed Cricket	Simon and Schuster UK	ISBN 1471146804	
2017	An Eye on Cricket	Wilkinson Publishing	ISBN 9781925642216	
2018	Crossing the Line: How Australian Cricket Lost Its Way	Slattery Media Group	ISBN 9781921778940	
2018	Shadows on the Pitch: The Long Summer of 2017-2018	Wilkinson Publishing	ISBN 9781925642520	
2019	The Standard Bearers: Australia v India, Pakistan and Sri Lanka 2018-19	Wilkinson Publishing	ISBN 9781925642933	
2022	The All-Rounder: the Inside Story of Big Time Cricket	HarperCollins Australia	ISBN 9781460714201	Dan Christian with Gideon Haigh
2022	Sultan: a Memoir	Hardie Grant	ISBN 9781743798690	Wasim Akram with Gideon Haigh
2023	On the Ashes: the Greatest Sporting Contest of All Time	Allen & Unwin	ISBN 9781761470028	
2023	Ashes 2023: a Cricket Classic	Scribe Publications	ISBN 9781761380907	
2024	The One Indiscretion of His Life: William Carkeek, Cricketer, Footballer, Worker	Archives Liberation Front		

=== Works on other topics ===
Year	Title	Publisher	ISBN	Notes	Ref
1987	The Battle for BHP	Information Australia with Allen & Unwin Australia	ISBN 0949338400		
1999	One of a Kind: the Story of Bankers Trust Australia 1969-1999	Text Publishing	ISBN 1876485124		
2003	The Uncyclopedia: Everything You Never Knew You Wanted To Know	Text Publishing	ISBN 1877008877		
2005	Fat Cats: the Strange Cult of the CEO	Thunder's Mouth Press	ISBN 1560256397		
2005	Asbestos House: the unauthorised story of James Hardie Industries	Scribe Publications	ISBN 1920769625		
2008	The Racket: How Abortion Became Legal in Australia	Melbourne University Publishing	ISBN 9780522855784		
2012	The Office: a Hardworking History	Melbourne University Publishing	ISBN 9780522855562		
2012	The Deserted Newsroom	Penguin	ISBN 9780143569367		
2013	End of the Road?	Penguin Australia	ISBN 9780143570875		
2015	Certain Admissions: a Beach, a Body, and a Lifetime of Secrets	Viking	ISBN 9780670078318		
2018	A Scandal in Bohemia: the LIfe and Death of Mollie Dean	Hamish Hamilton	ISBN 9780143789574		
2019	This is How I Will Strangle You	Wilkinson Publishing	ISBN 9781925927207		
2020	The Momentous, Uneventful Day: a Requiem for the Office	Scribe Publications	ISBN 9781922310491		
2021	The Brilliant Boy: Doc Evatt and the Great Australian Dissent	Simon and Schuster	ISBN 9781760856120		
2022	The Night Was a Bright Moonlight and I Could See a Man Quite Plain : An Edwardian Cricket Murder	Scribner	ISBN 9781761108266		
2022	An Unfinished Masterpiece	Parliament of Victoria	ISBN 9780645261912	With Peter Elliott	
2023	The Girl in Cabin 350: Dossier of a Disappearance	Archives Liberation Front	ISBN 9780005511442		
2024	My Brother Jaz	Melbourne University Publishing	ISBN 9780522880830		
2025	Who Is Wallace? The Enigma of the World's Oldest Prisoner	Archives Liberation Front	ISBN 9780646726922		
2026	A Grateful Son	HarperCollins	ISBN 9781460765111	Co-author with Josh Frydenberg	

== Essays and book reviews ==
- Haigh, Gideon (February 2006). "How Google is making us stupid". The Monthly.
- — (March 2009). "Vanity fare". The Monthly. 43: 54–55. Review of Michael Wolff, The man who owns the news.
- — (April 2009). "The pursuit of usable beauty : Damien Wright & his table". The Monthly. 44: 42–49.
- — (June 2011). "Tickle time". Australian Book Review. 332: 21–22. Review of Lindsay Tanner, Sideshow : dumbing down democracy.
- — (October 2022). "The daily Dan : a timely political biography". Australian Book Review. 447: 12, 14. Review of Sumeyya Ilanbey, Daniel Andrews : the revealing biography of Australia's most powerful premier.
