= Hunter White =

Australian pastoralist, racehorse owner and breeder

- Born: 4 October 1867; Denman, New South Wales
- Died: 1 March 1947 (aged 79); Double Bay, New South Wales
- Education: Newington College; St Paul's College, University of Sydney
- Occupation: Pastoralist
- Spouse(s): Leila Ethel White (née Arguimbau)
- Children: 1 daughter and 2 sons
- Parent(s): Henry Charles White and Isabella Mary Ann (née Lowe)

Henry Hunter White (4 October 1867 – 11 March 1947) was an Australian pastoralist, racehorse owner and breeder. He was a noted philanthropist who supported post-war repatriation with substantial gifts of land and the Church of England in New South Wales. He was born into a socially prominent rural family who had arrived in Sydney in 1826 and owned the Merino sheep and North Devon cattle property Havilah.

== Birth and early life ==
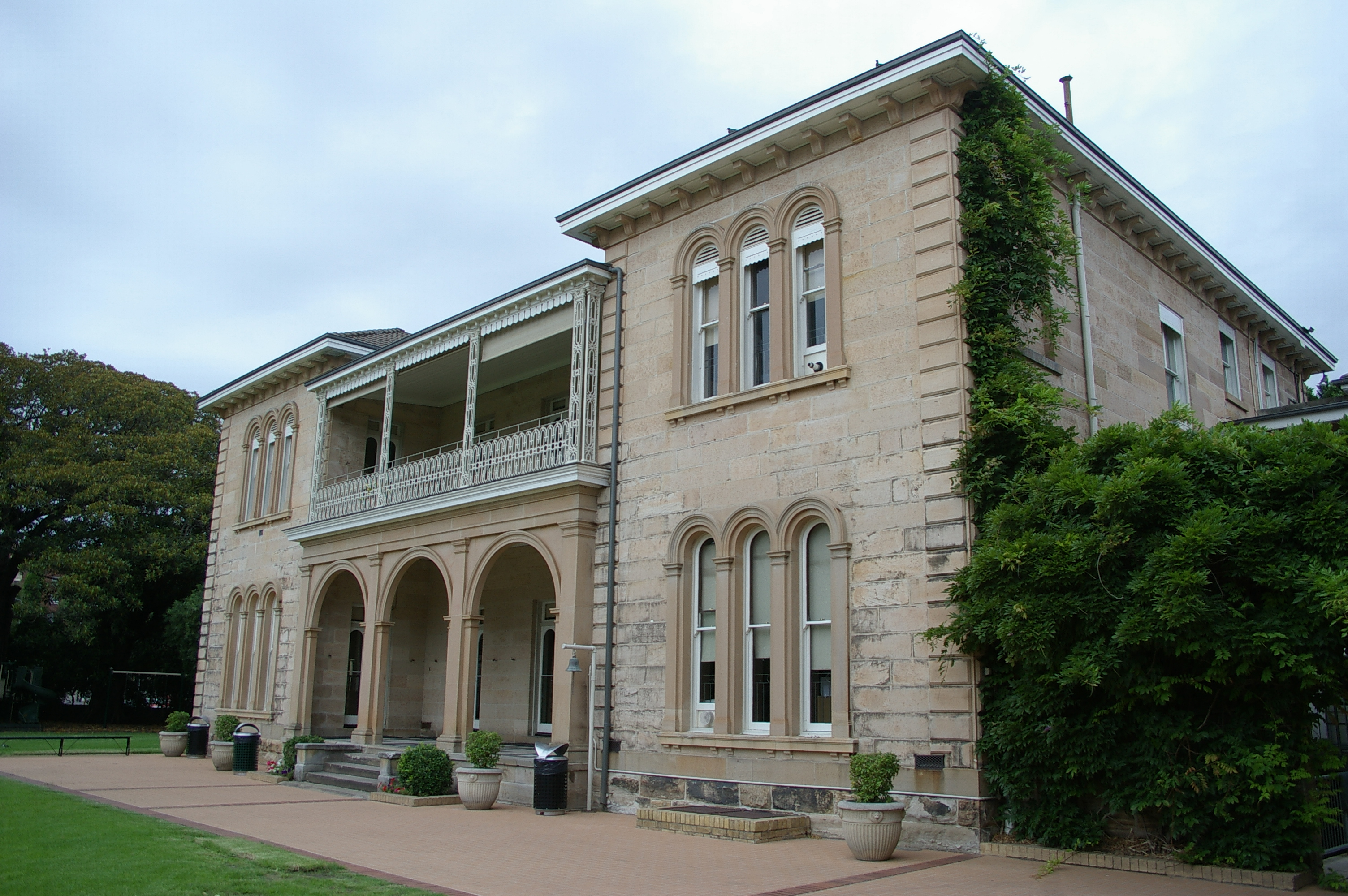
Fiona Edgecliff

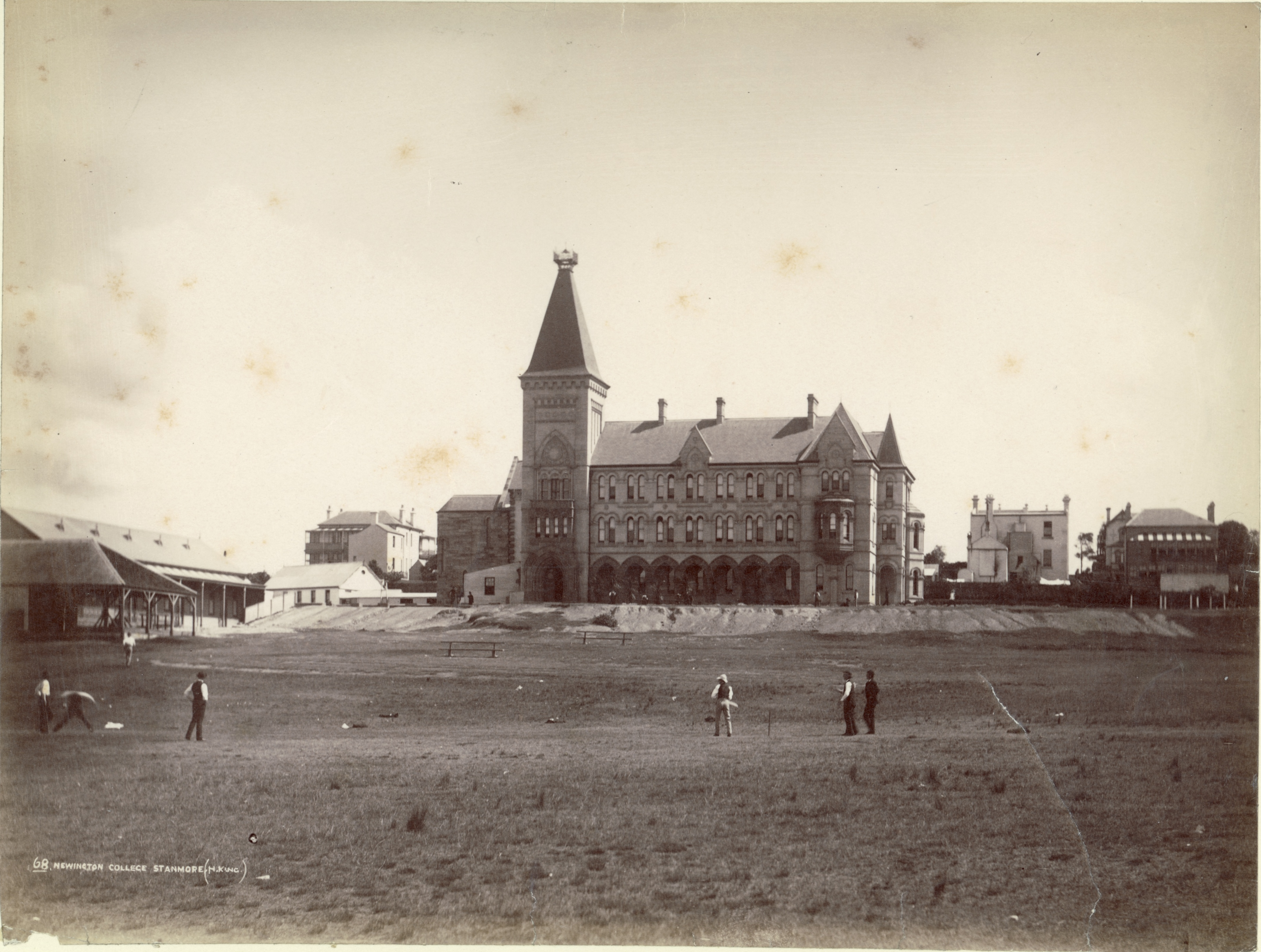
Newington College

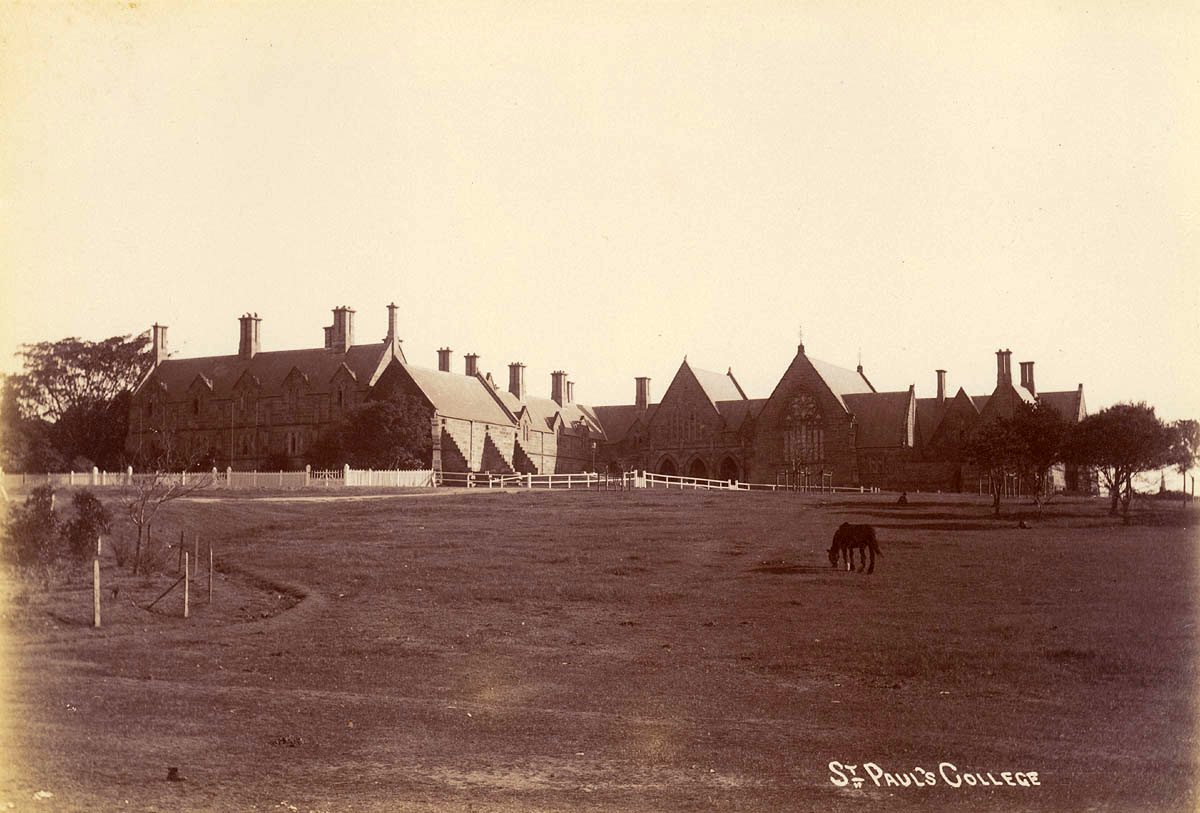
St Paul's College

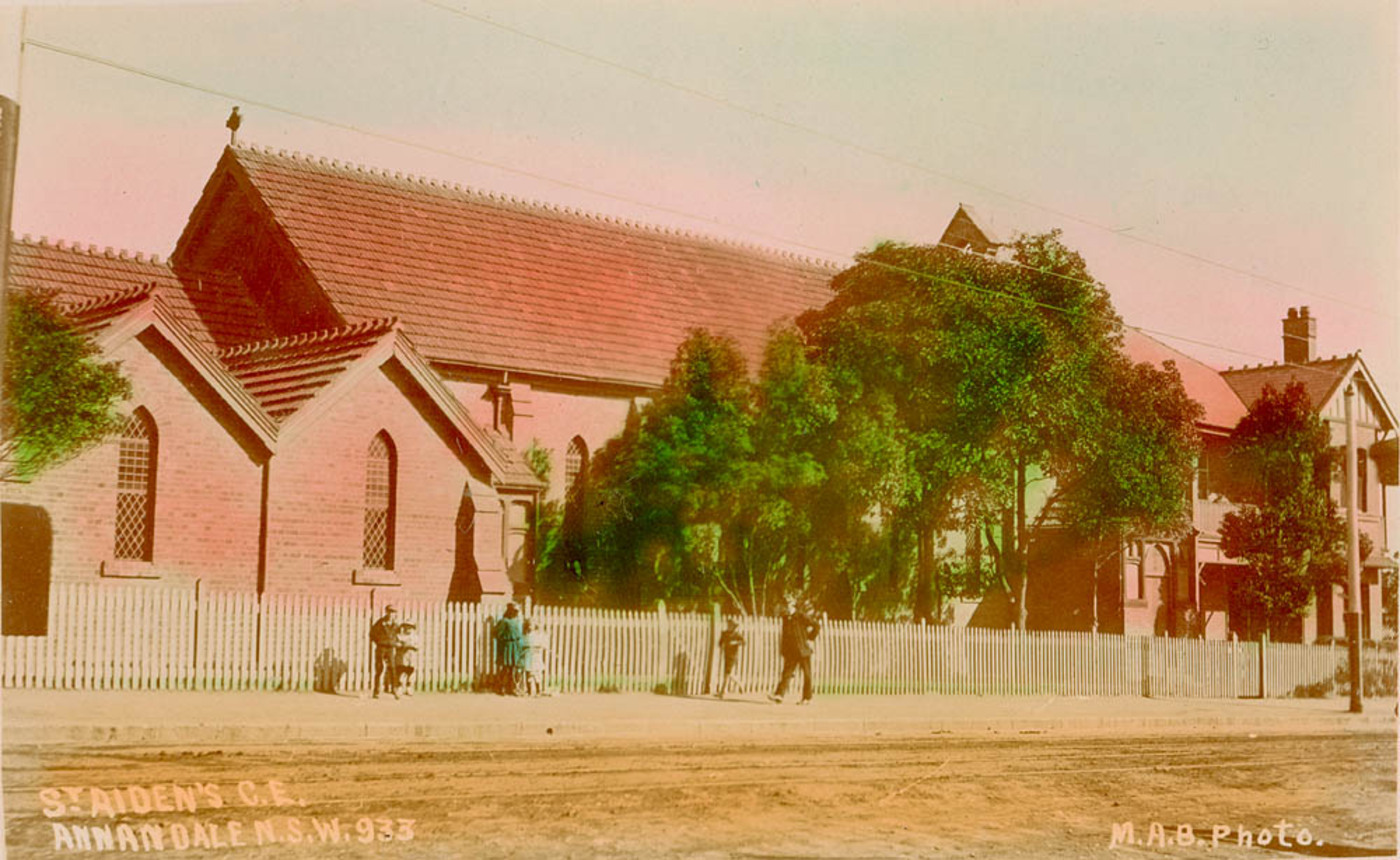
St Aidens Annandale

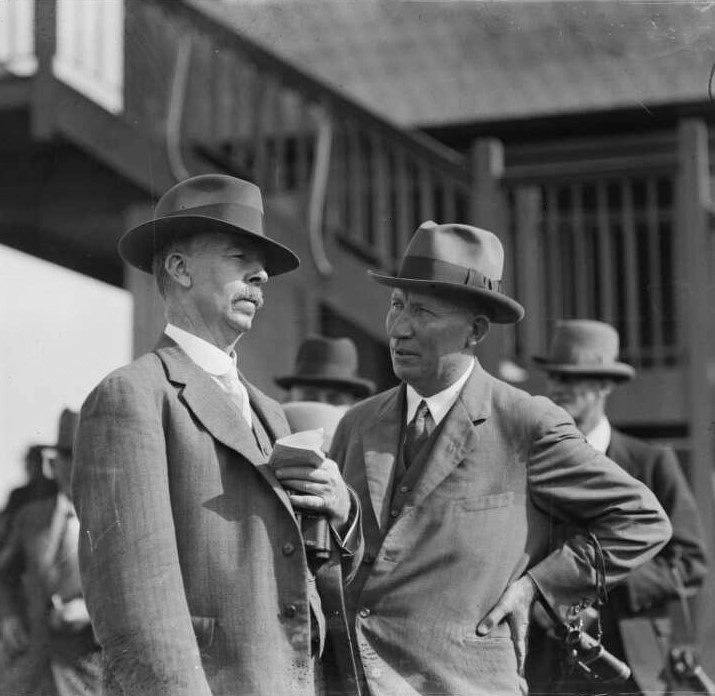
Hunter White and Frank Marsden at the races

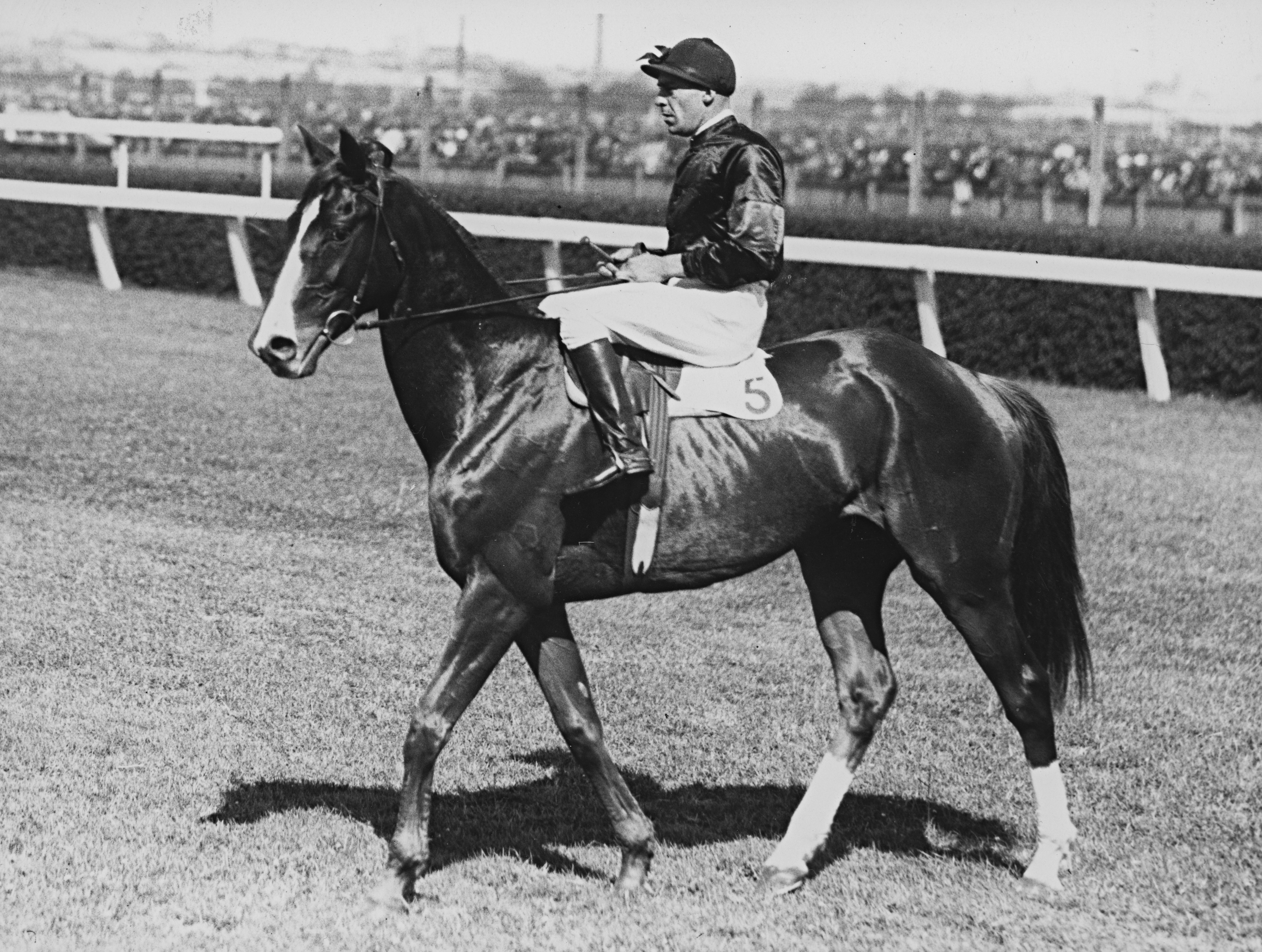
Rogilla 1933

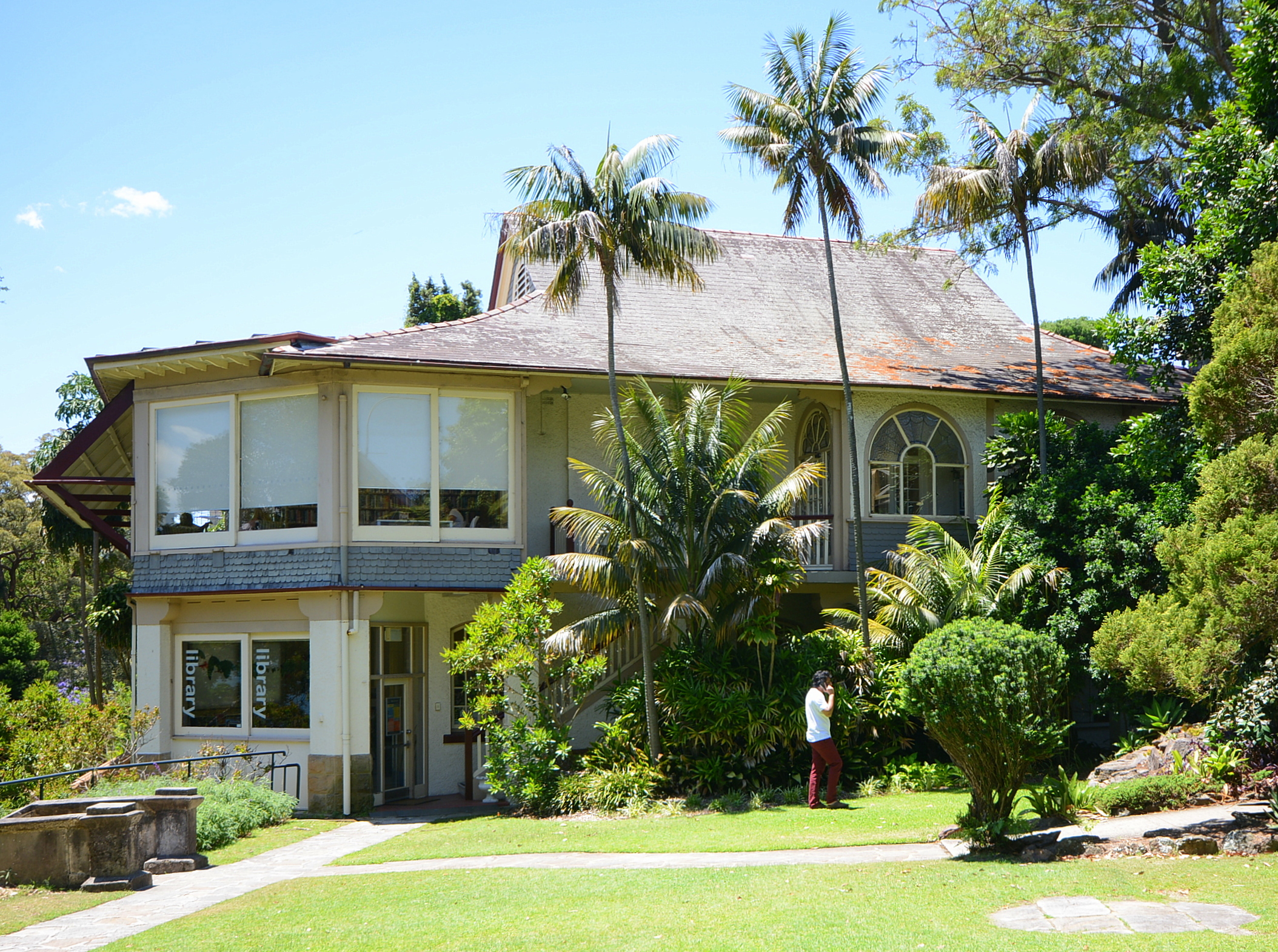
St Brigid's Double Bay

White was born at Woodlands, near Denman, New South Wales. He was the son of Henry Charles White and his first wife, Isabella Mary Ann (née Lowe). Woodlands, an historic stud and homestead, had been bought by White's grandfather, James White circa 1860 and passed in to his father's hands in 1868. White was tutored privately in the country and at Fiona, in Edgecliff, when his father rented the house as a Sydney residence. On 18 April 1875 White’s mother, Isabella, died suddenly after the birth of her sixth child. Whilst on holiday in Tasmania in 1877 his father married again. The White family moved from Woodlands to Havilah in 1879. The new Mrs White brought her two sisters to live at Havilah and subsequently bore Henry Charles White five children. The children of the first marriage became unsettled and the daughters were sent to school in France. Hunter White commenced at Newington College in 1883 during the presidency of the Rev Joseph Horner Fletcher and the last year of the headmastership of Joseph Coates. On enrolment at Newington his registration card says his previous education had been at Hutchins School in Hobart but the register of that school does not show White as a student. He was a candidate admitted to matriculation in the Lent term of 1886 after which he went up to the University and was a resident of St Paul's College, University of Sydney. He stayed up at the University until 1889 although at the time of his death The Pauline, the magazine of his college, didn’t mention his academic record but spoke of White coming from “one of the wealthiest and most influential pastoral families in the state.”

== Marriage and children ==
On 19 May 1897, White married Leila Ethel Arguimbau. Known as Lily, the bride was the daughter of Narcissus George Arguimbau, a Knight of the Legion of Honour. Her brothers were all Old Newingtonians as was the groom. The wedding ceremony was at St Aidan's Church of England in Annandale and a reception was held in the Arguimbau family home, Cliveden, on neighbouring Johnston Street. The couple had three children: Constance White (1898–1978 ); Peter White (1901–1970); and Henry Charles Hunter White (1905–1988).

== Philanthropic gifts ==
After World War I, White donated 3470 acres of well improved freehold land to resettle returned soldiers. White built Havilah Memorial Church in 1905 in memory of his father. It was designed by the local architect Harold Hardwick and built of stone. Three years later he gifted it to the Church of England. In 1921, St John's Church of England, Mudgee, founded a hostel to give girls residential accommodation whilst they were educated at Mudgee High School. The venture was housed at Bleak House, an 1860s mansion in Market Street, and the building and grounds were made available rent-free for three years by White. He later gave the property to the church. Due to financial difficulties the hostel closed in 1935 and the proceeds of the subdivision and sale of Bleak House were gifted, with White's permission, to the Church of England Diocese of Sydney.

== Horse racing ==
From 1900 until his death, White was a member of the Australian Jockey Club and was an elected member of the committee from 1910 through to his retirement in 1940. He also served as a member of the Western Districts Racing Association executive. He was the breeder and owner of Rogilla, the chestnut Australian Thoroughbred gelding. Rogilla won in each of the six seasons that he raced as a three-year-old to an eight-year-old. An outstanding galloper, Rogilla won on wet or dry tracks recording 26 wins from 4½ furlongs to 2 miles. White also owned Haxton, Open Air and Vigaro. He imported the sires Roger de Busli, Tippler, Buoyant Bachelor and Fresco.

== Later life and death ==
In 1919 White bought St. Brigid's at 548 New South Head Road, Double Bay, as his Sydney residence. The house was designed by the English architect Frederick Moore Simpson and built in 1897. On his death, White left an estate valued at £354,968. St Brigid's was purchased by Woollahra Council in 1951 and was the home of Woollahra Municipal Library from 1957 until 2016. In 2021 St Bridgid's became the Woollahra Gallery at Redleaf whilst Havilah remains in the ownership of the White family.
