= Ken Eastwood =

Australian cricketer

Personal information
- Full name: Kenneth Humphrey Eastwood
- Born: 23 November 1935 (age 90); Chatswood, New South Wales, Australia
- Batting: Left-handed
- Bowling: Slow left-arm wrist-spin

International information
- National side: Australia
- Only Test (cap 256): 12 February 1971 v England

Domestic team information
- Years: Team
- 1959/60–1971/72: Victoria

Career statistics
Competition	Test	FC	LA
Matches	1	42	4
Runs scored	5	2,722	139
Batting average	2.50	41.87	34.75
100s/50s	0/0	9/8	0/1
Top score	5	221	69
Balls bowled	40	616	0
Wickets	1	6	–
Bowling average	21.00	63.83	–
5 wickets in innings	0	0	–
10 wickets in match	0	0	–
Best bowling	1/21	1/10	–
Catches/stumpings	0/–	27/–	2/–
- Source: Cricinfo, 15 July 2020

Kenneth Humphrey Eastwood (born 23 November 1935) is a former Australian cricketer who played one Test in 1971.

A left-handed opening batsman, Ken Eastwood played first-class cricket for Victoria from 1959–60 to 1971–72. In 1969–70, when Victoria won the Sheffield Shield, he was their leading batsman, with 584 runs at an average of 41.71. In the 1970-71 Sheffield Shield, he scored 737 runs at an average of 122.83, with three centuries and a top score of 221 against South Australia.

Eastwood replaced Bill Lawry in the Test team for the final match of the series against England in 1970-71, although Lawry had been the Test captain since 1968. Eastwood failed with the bat, scoring five and a duck, but took one wicket, that of Keith Fletcher, with his left-arm unorthodox spin.

In a booklet about Eastwood produced by the Australian Cricket Society, it was revealed that although Eastwood played only one Test, he ended up with two caps. He was given two caps to try for size, and no one ever asked him to return the unused one.

== See also ==
- One-Test wonder
