= Tom Garrett (cricketer) =

Australian cricketer

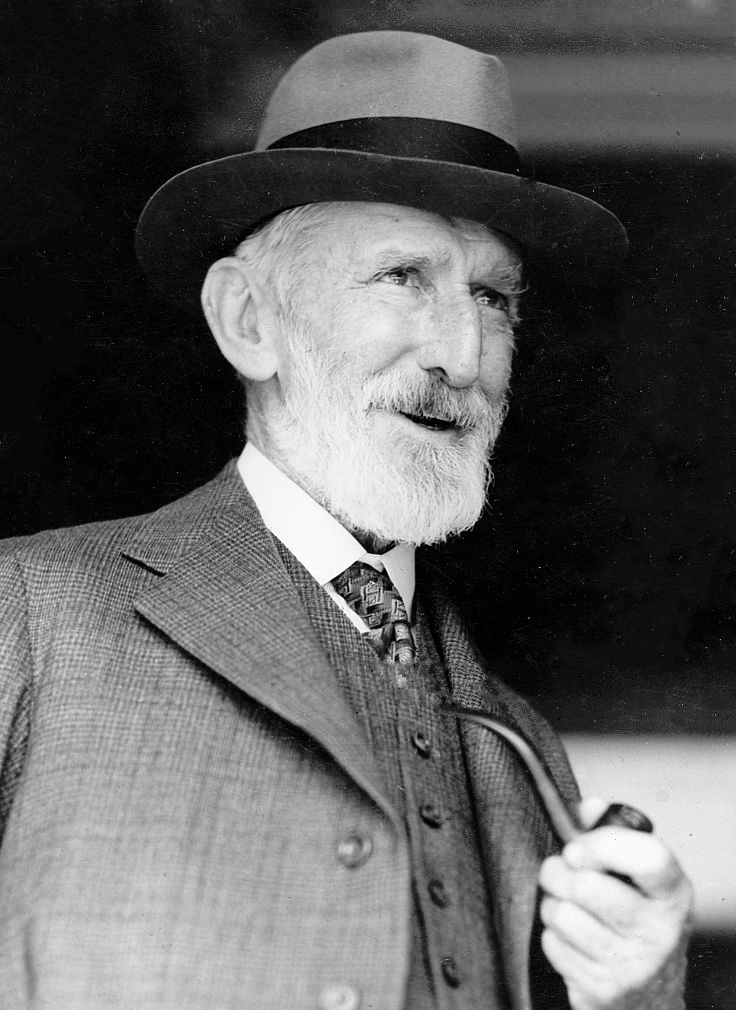
- Tom Garrett in 1937

Personal information
- Born: 26 July 1858; Wollongong, Colony of New South Wales
- Died: 6 August 1943 (aged 85); Sydney, New South Wales
- Batting: Right-handed
- Bowling: Right-arm fast medium
- Relatives: Hubert Garrett (son)

International information
- National side: Australia
- Test debut (cap 4): 15 March 1877 v England
- Last Test: 15 February 1888 v England

Career statistics
Competition	Tests	First-class
Matches	19	160
Runs scored	339	3,673
Batting average	12.55	16.18
100s/50s	0/1	2/10
Top score	51*	163
Balls bowled	2,728	24,316
Wickets	36	446
Bowling average	26.94	18.72
5 wickets in innings	2	29
10 wickets in match	0	4
Best bowling	6/78	7/38
Catches/stumpings	7/–	81/–
- Source: CricInfo, 12 March 2019

Thomas William Garrett (26 July 1858 – 6 August 1943) was an early Australian Test cricketer and, later, a distinguished public servant.

== Early life ==
Tom Garrett was the second son of a newspaper proprietor and politician who bore the same name. His mother, Mary Ann née Creagan, was his father's first wife. Garrett was educated at Newington College (1867–1872), while the school was still at Newington House, in the Sydney suburb of Silverwater. His ability as a cricketer and sprinter was encouraged by the assistant master Joseph Coates.

== Public service career ==
In 1873 he matriculated to the University of Sydney and attended lectures for several terms. In January of the next year, his father secured for him a clerkship in the New South Wales Department of Lands. He transferred to the New South Wales Supreme Court in 1876 and was admitted to practice law as a solicitor on 25 February 1882. He became registrar of probates in 1890, curator of intestate estates as well in 1896, and the public trustee in 1914. When he retired in 1924, his staff had increased from fourteen to 67, and some 25,000 estates, involving over £10 million, had passed through his office. That year, Garrett returned to private practise as a solicitor and, at 81, still attended his office daily.

== Cricket career ==
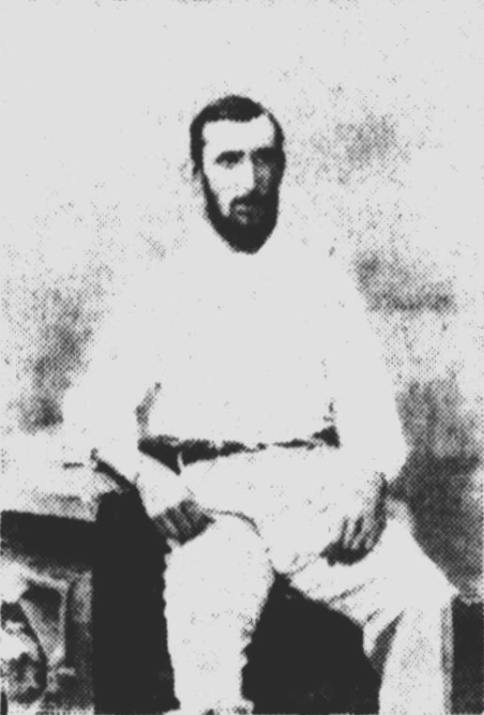
Garrett during his playing days.

A tall all-rounder, he played for New South Wales, batting and bowling right-handed. Bowling, however, was his strength. He bowled at fast-medium pace and took part in 19 Tests, scoring 339 runs at 12.55, and taking 36 wickets at an average of 26.94, with best figures of 6–78. In 160 first-class cricket matches he scored 3,673 runs at 16.18, and took 446 wickets at 18.27 runs per wicket, including 29 hauls of five wickets in an innings.

Garrett played in the first Test match, against Lillywhite's team in Melbourne in March 1877. At 18 years and 232 days is still the youngest representative to play for Australia against England. In that match on the 2nd day he scored 18 not out in the first innings, and helped sustain a crucial 43-run partnership with Charles Bannerman until the latter split his finger and retired hurt on 165. His 18 not out was, on that day, the 2nd highest test score. Garrett's score was passed later in the day by England opener, Harry Jupp. Promoted to number four in the second innings, Garrett made a duck (zero runs). Opening the bowling with John Hodges he took two wickets in the first innings (including that of top scorer, Henry Jupp). In 1878, he toured England and North America with the first representative Australian team to go overseas. He toured England again in 1882, participating in an historic Ashes match at The Oval. His last match was at Sydney in 1888.

As a bowler it was said by the all-rounder George Giffen that: "... he would keep a fine line outside the off-stump, and never minded being hit. Sometimes the ball would work a little from the pitch which victimised most of the batsmen." He would release the ball from as high a point as he could reach, taking advantage of his 6-foot-tall (1.8 m) (183 centimetre) frame. Later in his career, as his bowling fell away, he became a powerful batsman, particularly square of the wicket. He was also noted for his speed in the field: in a Sydney match in 1887 it was reported in the press that he caught a skied ball "in a display of breathtaking agility".

Garret became captain of New South Wales. He was rated highly as a skipper, especially for his skill in handling aspiring young bowlers. He was the selector nominated by New South Wales for the Australian team that toured England in 1890.

He died in 1943 and following a service at St James' Church in Turramurra was cremated at the Northern Suburbs Crematorium. At the time of his death he was Australia's oldest living Test player and the last survivor of the first Test Match.

== Descendants ==
Garrett's great-grandson is the Midnight Oil lead singer and former Australian federal politician and government minister, Peter Garrett. Trevor Garrett is a great-great-grandson

== See also ==
- History of Test cricket (to 1883)
- List of New South Wales representative cricketers

== Bibliography ==
- Pollard, Jack, Australian Cricket: 1803–1893, The Formative Years, Sydney, The Book Company, 1995. (ISBN 0-207-15490-2)
- Pollard, Jack, Australian Cricket: The Game and the Players, Sydney, Hodder & Stoughton, 1982. (ISBN 0-340-28796-9)
- Bonnell, Max, Currency Lads: The Life and Cricket of T.W. Garrett, R.C. Allen, S.P. Jones and R.J. Pope (Cricket Pub., 2001, ISBN 0-9578089-0-9).
