= Rogilla =

Australian-bred Thoroughbred racehorse

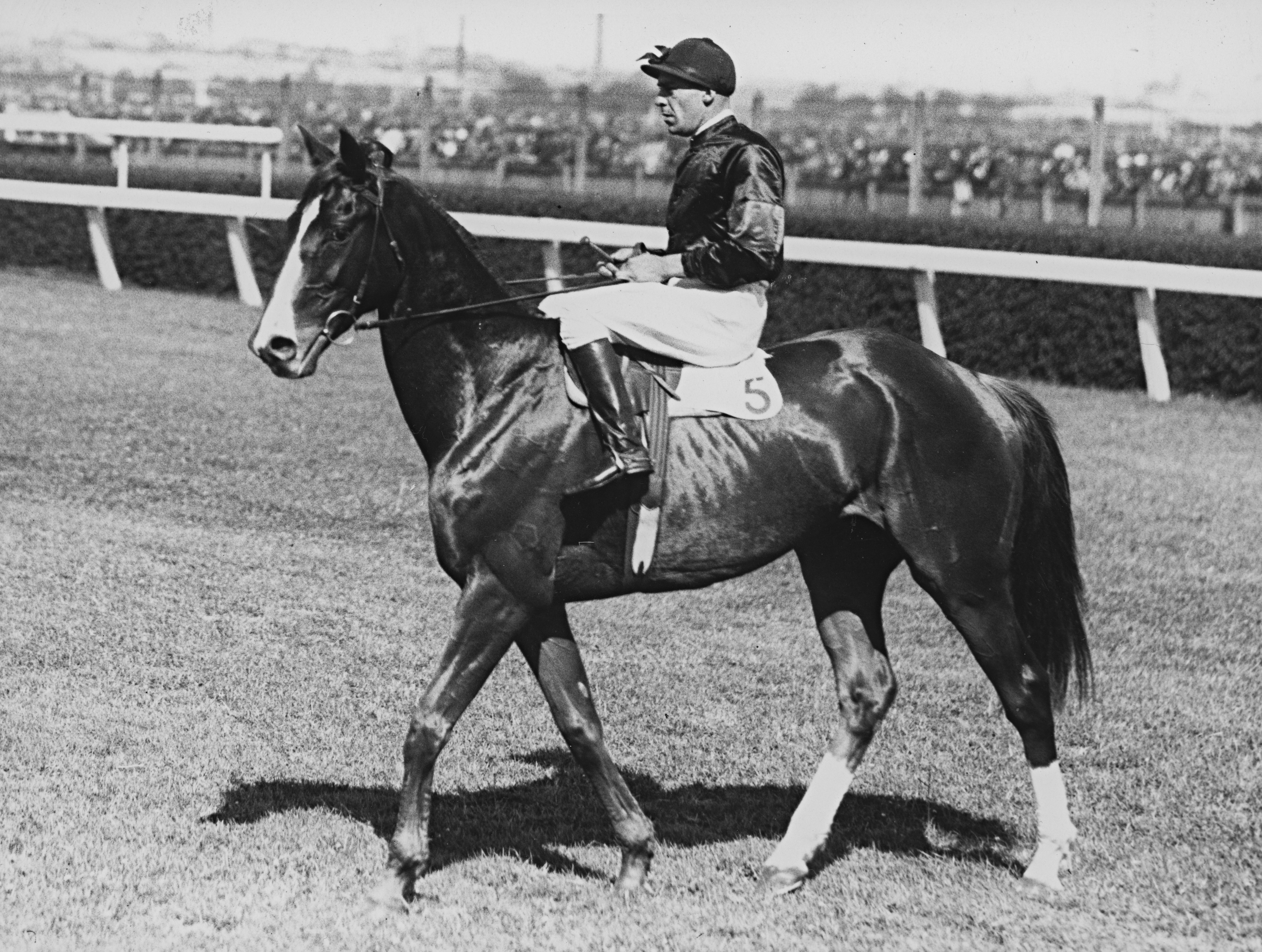
- Rogilla and Darby Munro.
- Sire: Roger de Busli (GB)
- Grandsire: Hurry On (GB)
- Dam: Speargila (AUS)
- Damsire: Brakespear (GB)
- Sex: Gelding
- Foaled: 1927
- Country: Australia
- Colour: Chestnut
- Breeder: Hunter White
- Owner: Henry White
- Trainer: Les Haigh (and lessee)
- Record: 70: 26 (5 dead-heats), 12, 11
- Earnings: £22,674 $45,348

Major wins
- Caulfield Cup (1932); Tramway Handicap (1932); Sydney Cup (1933); W S Cox Plate (1933); Melbourne Stakes (1933); C.B.Fisher Plate (1933; Randwick Plate (1933); AJC Autumn Plate (1933); Chelmsford Stakes (1933, 1934); AJC Spring Stakes (1933, 1934); AJC Kings Cup (1934); Rawson Stakes (1934); Chipping Norton Stakes (1935); Warwick Stakes (1935)

Rogilla was a chestnut Australian thoroughbred racehorse. Known as the Coalfields Champion from Newcastle, Rogilla won in each of the six seasons that he raced as a three-year-old to an eight-year-old, recording 26 wins from 4½ furlongs to 2 miles. His regular jockey was Darby Munro.

== Breeding ==
Rogilla was by Roger de Busli (GB), and his dam Speargila was by Brakespear (GB). Roger de Busli (GB) won three races from 20 starts in England. He commenced stud duties in 1925, but sired only one other winner of a principal race in Oro 1935 AJC Metropolitan Handicap.

Rogilla's dam Speargila was a racemare that won 13 races in Sydney, plus 10 other provincial and country races. Speargila was line-bred to Prince Charlie, as both Lochiel and Clan Stuart were sired by him. She was the dam of six foals, which all raced. Rogilla was the second foal.

His breeder, Hunter White of Havilah, was a well known Australian Jockey Club committeeman (1910–1940) and granted three consecutive leases to Rogilla's trainer.

== Racing career ==
Rogilla began his racing career two months short of his fourth season. His racing colours were black, with red armbands and cap. Rogilla was lightly framed and 15.3 hands tall. In 17 of the races he contested he won eight by a neck or less, lost four by a neck or less and figured in five dead heats for first.

In 1934 he defeated the champion Peter Pan in four successive meetings, including the AJC Kings Cup.

Rogilla when racing in Melbourne was stabled at Caulfield with trainer Cecil T Godby who trained the Caulfield Cup winners Purser 1924, Gaine Carrington 1933 and Northwind 1936.

J.E.(Ted) Boadle proprietor 'Star Shoeing Forge' Hamilton, Newcastle was a master blacksmith and racecourse farrier for 33 years. Originally from Grafton, he was accredited with Rogilla's success to withstand racing over multiple seasons due to the special bar shoes and bar plates he used. Rogilla was also accompanied trainer Les Haigh to Melbourne for the 1932 Caulfield Cup. Ted Boadle also put the first set of shoes on the champion Beauford, best remembered for his competition with Gloaming. In later years he was secretary of the Newcastle Farriers Association, for a 6-year period.

Trainer Les Haigh was born in 1892 at Bega. A former jockey in the Muswellbrook area, Haigh relocated his stables at 64 Everton Street Hamilton, Newcastle to Sydney. In 1934 he purchased leading Randwick trainer Frank Marsden's 10 box stables at 11 Bowral Street Kensington. The 'Gaulusville' stables were built and named soon after 1897 by Melbourne Cup winning jockey Stephen Callinan. Phar Lap began his racing career there in 1929.

Frank Marsden, originally from Gunnedah, trained Furious 1921 VRC Derby & VRC Oaks, Richmond Main 1919 AJC Derby & VRC Derby, Prince Viridis 1918 AJC St Leger & VRC St Leger, Cagou 1913 & 1917 AJC Metropolitan Handicap and the 1919 & 1922 AJC Sydney Cup winners Ian 'Or & Prince Charles.

Rogilla's racing record was 70 starts for 26 wins (including 5 dead heats), 12 seconds, 11 thirds and 21 unplaced runs.

== Image gallery ==
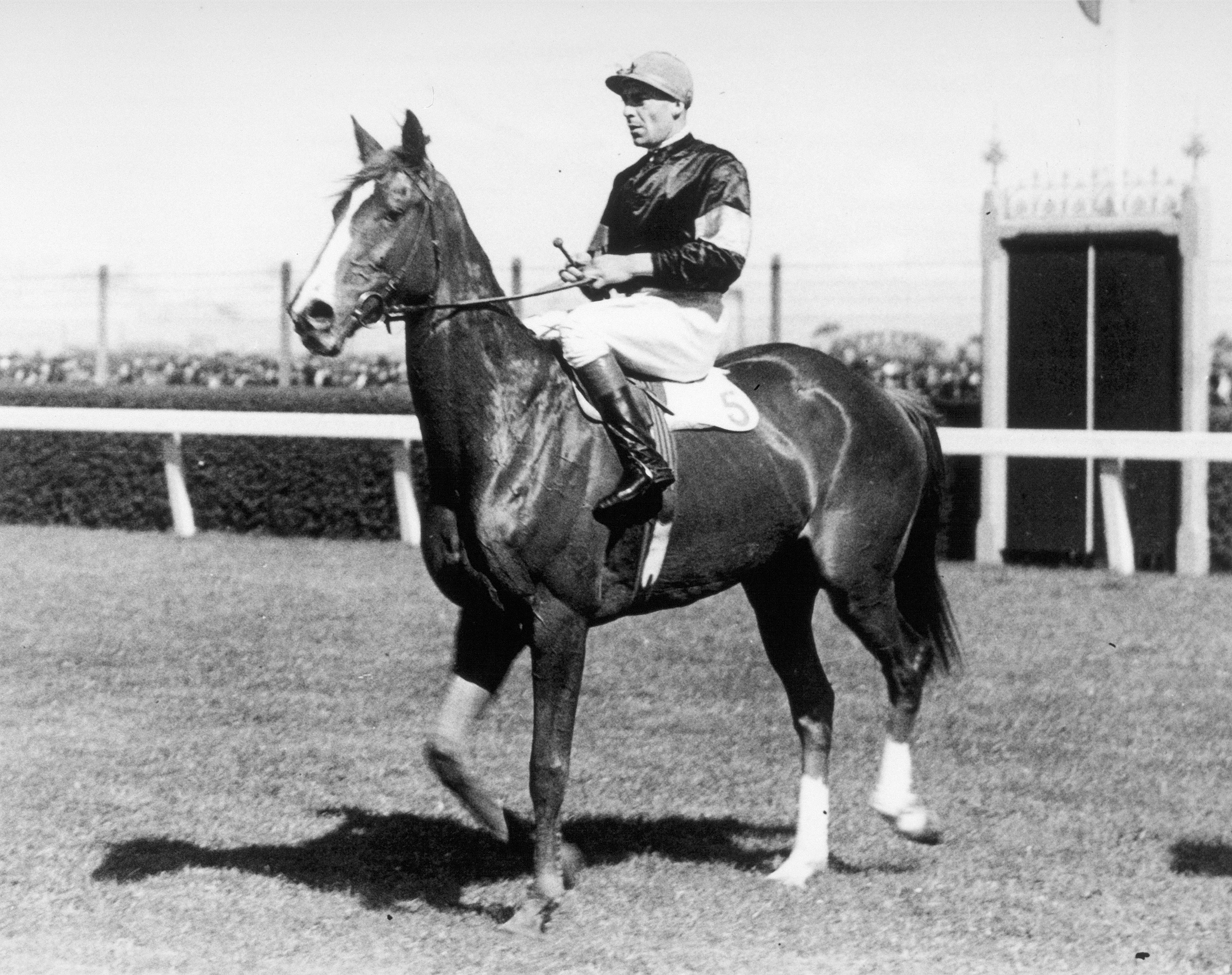
1933 VRC Melbourne Stakes winner, Rogilla & Darby Munro

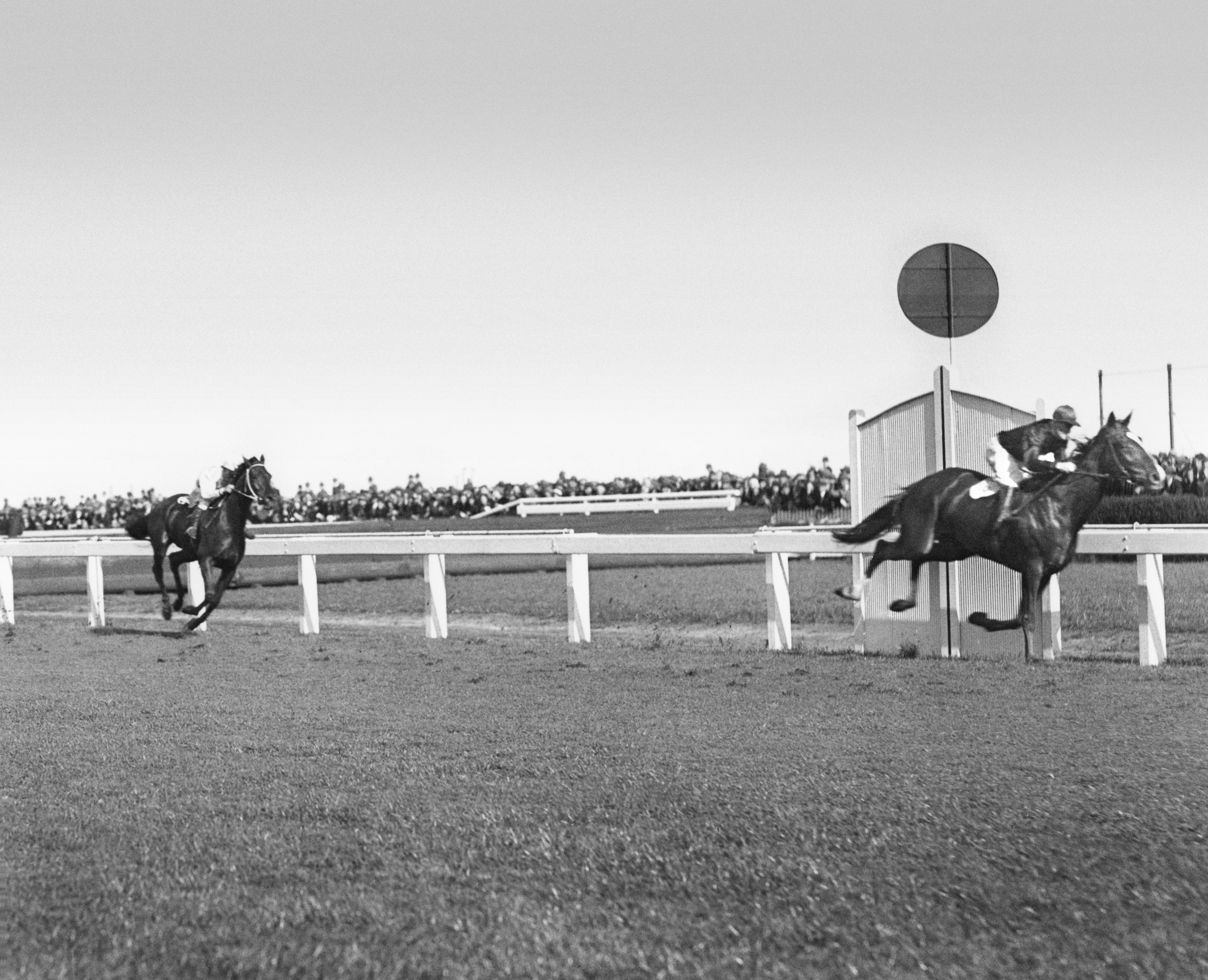
1932 VATC Caulfield Cup finish showing the winner, Rogilla

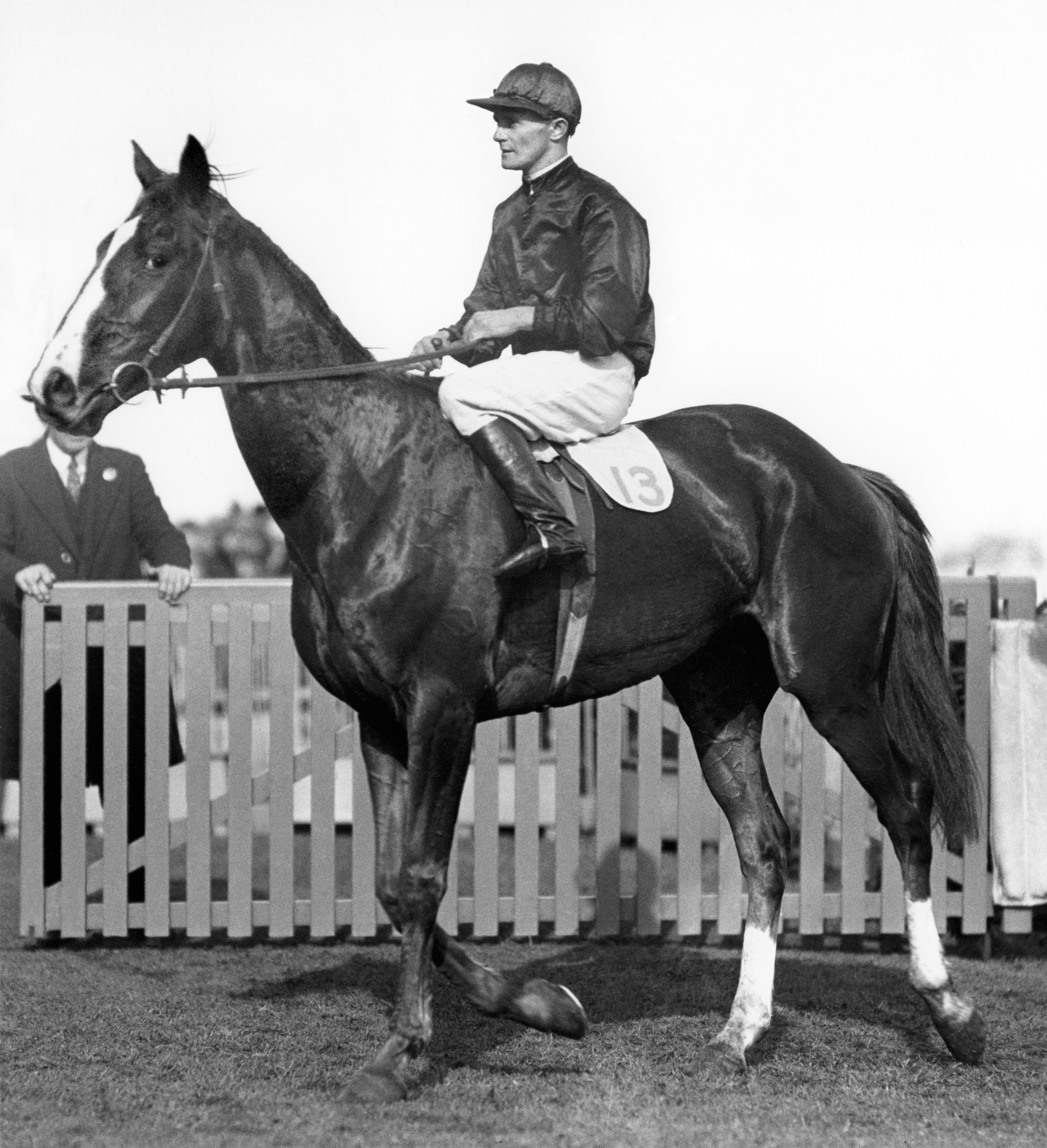
1932 VATC Caulfield Cup showing the winner, Rogilla George Robinson

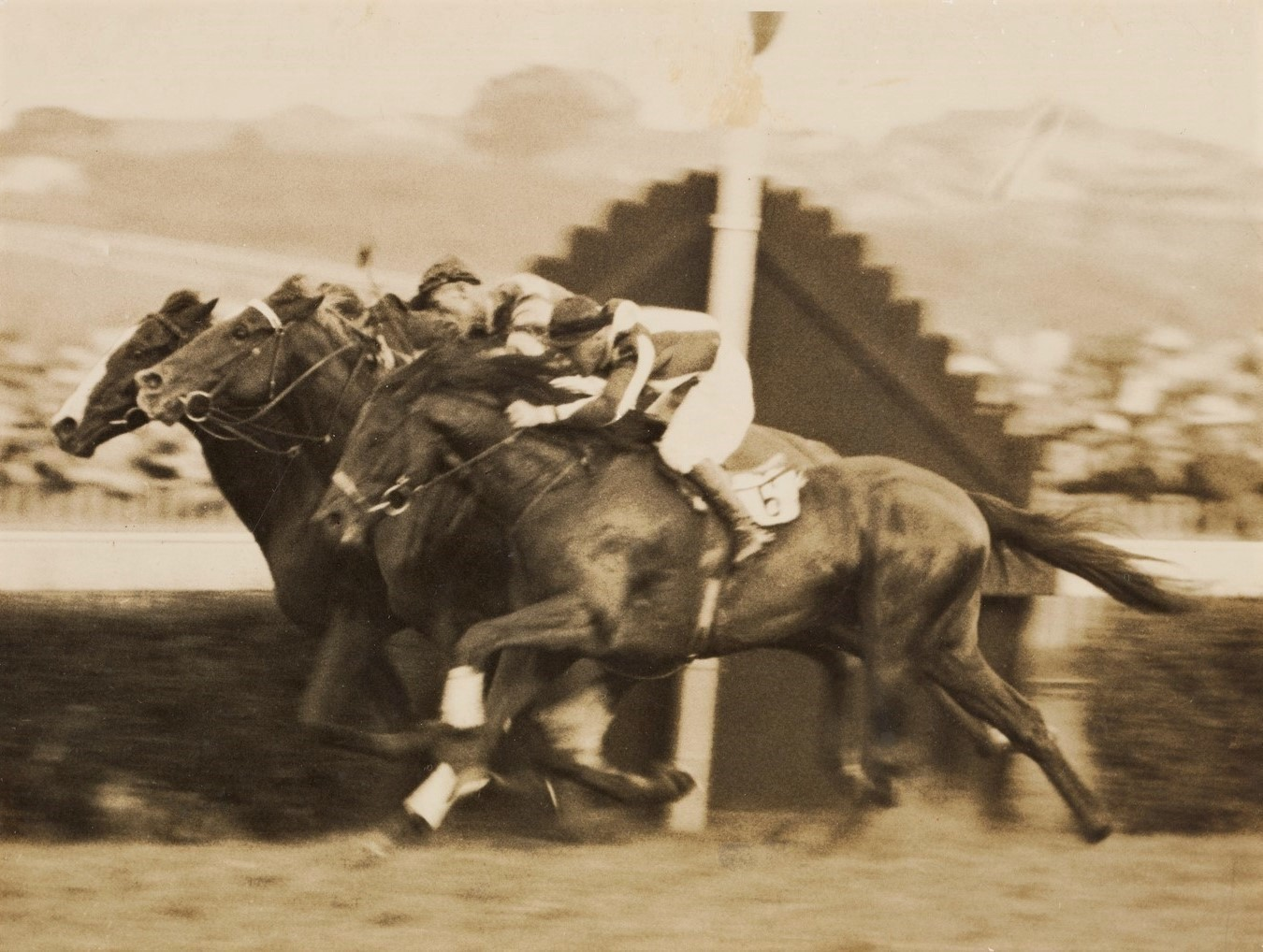
1934 AJC Kings Cup 1st Rogilla, 2nd Peter Pan, 3rd Kuvera

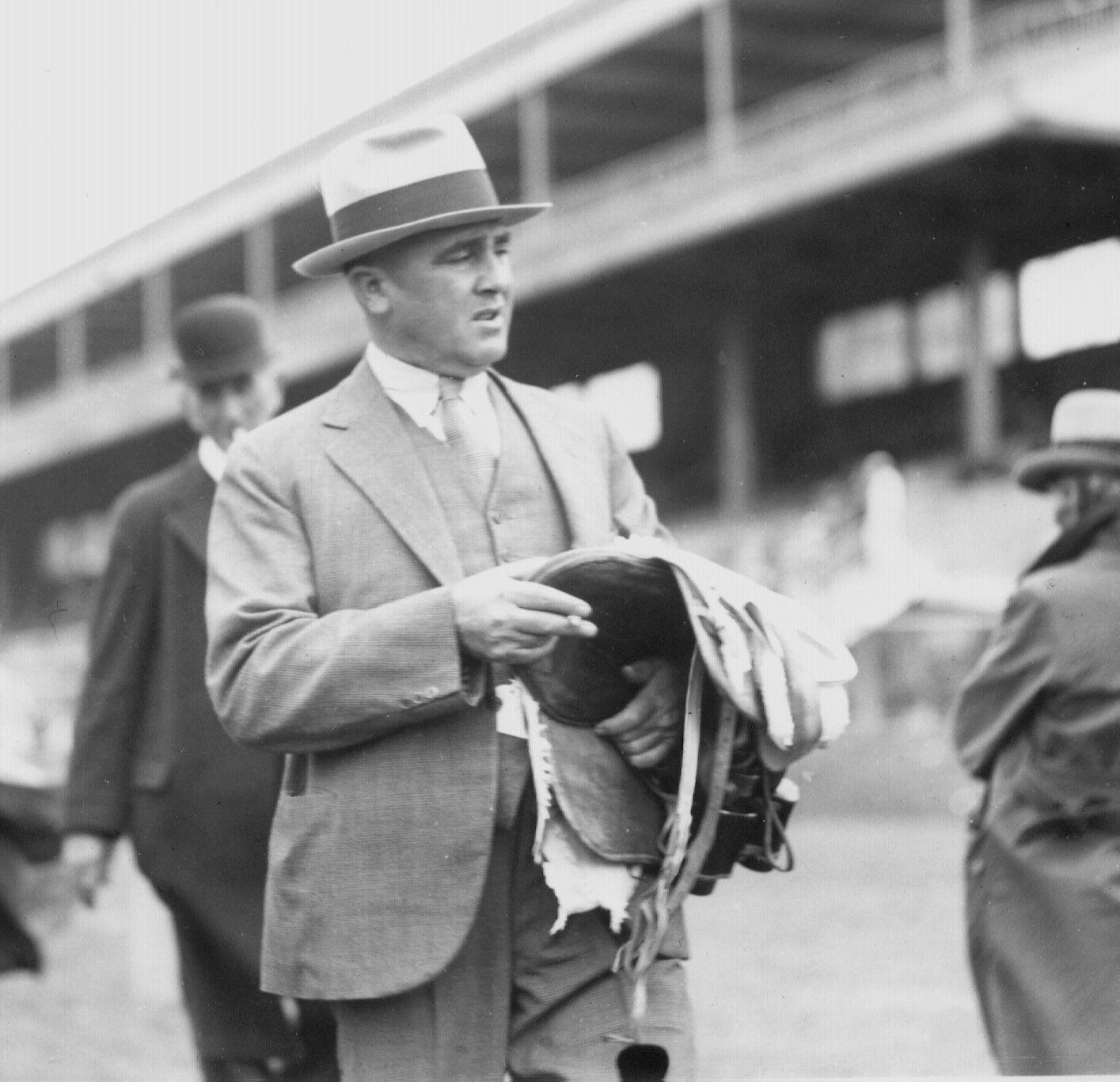
Les Haigh Randwick trainer

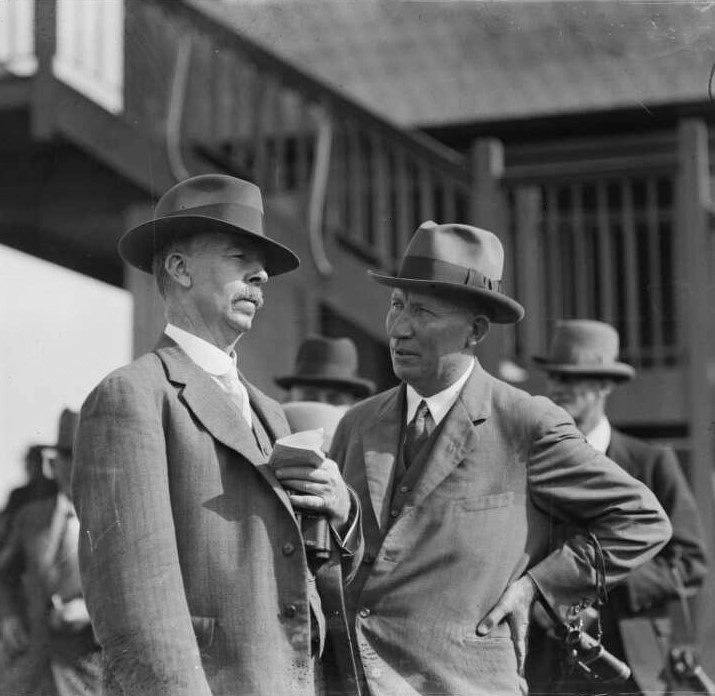
Hunter White and Frank Marsden

== 1933 and 1934 racebooks ==
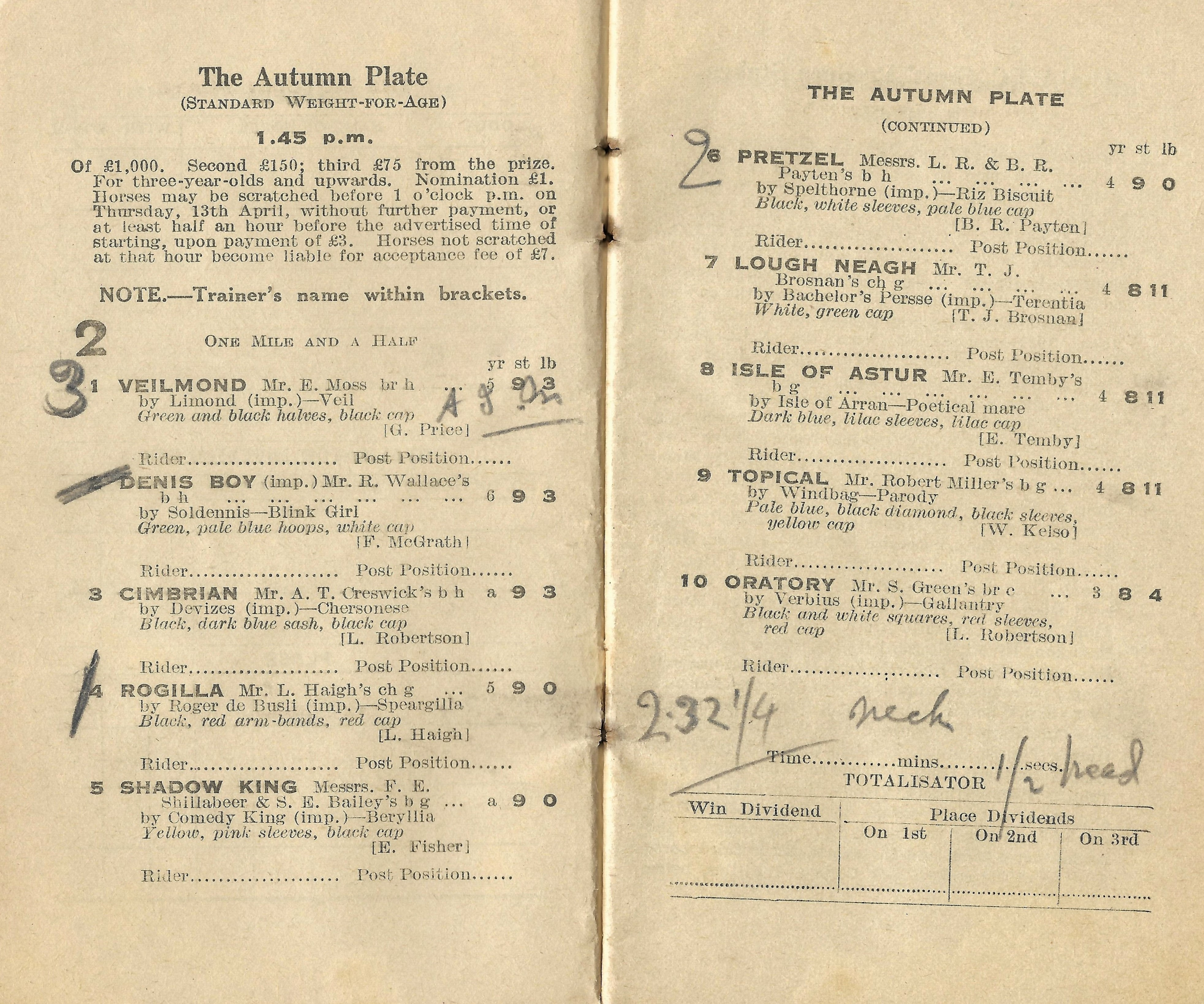
1933 AJC Autumn Plate Starters and results showing the winner, Rogilla

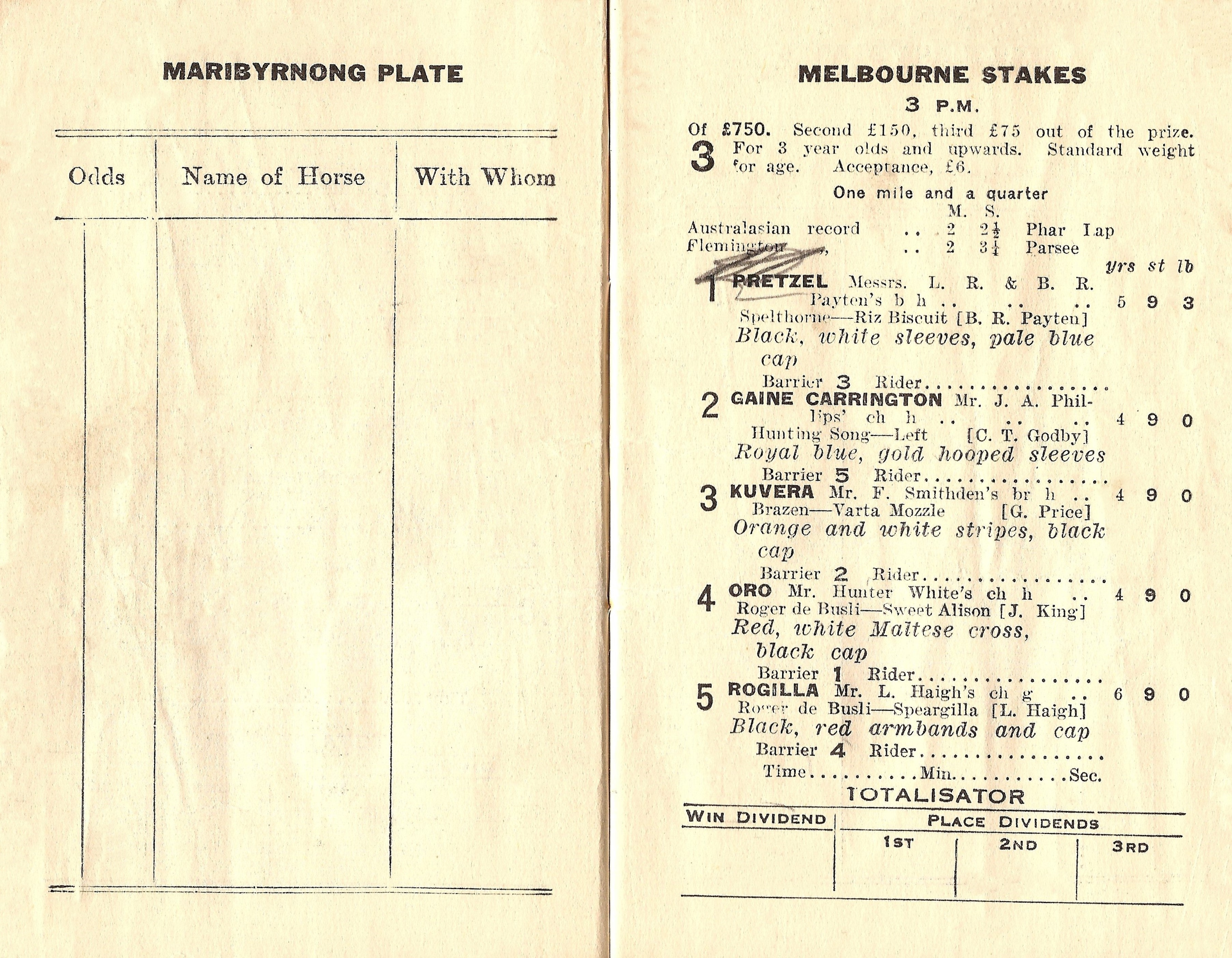
1933 VRC Melbourne Stakes showing the winner, Rogilla

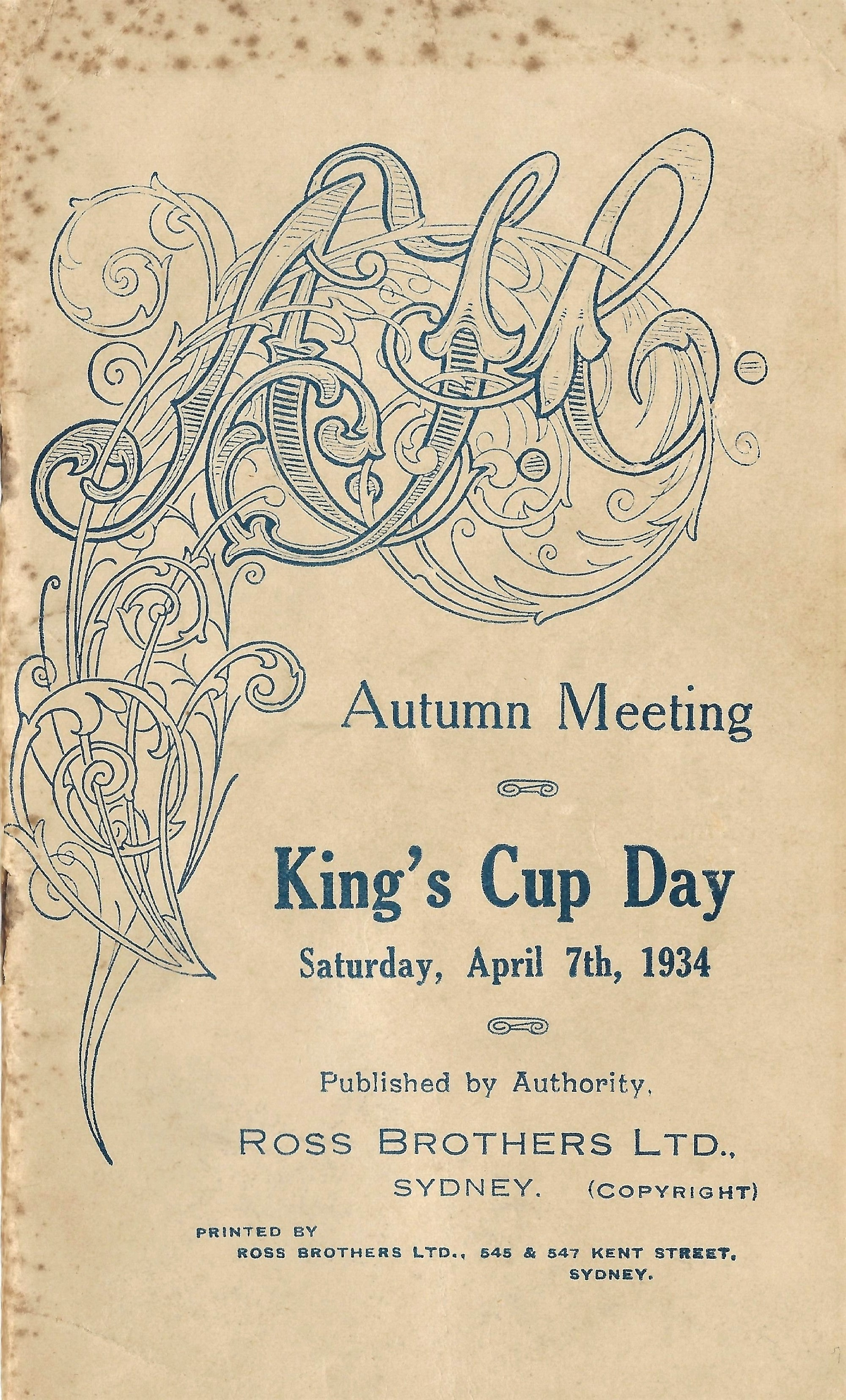
1934 AJC Kings Cup racebook front cover

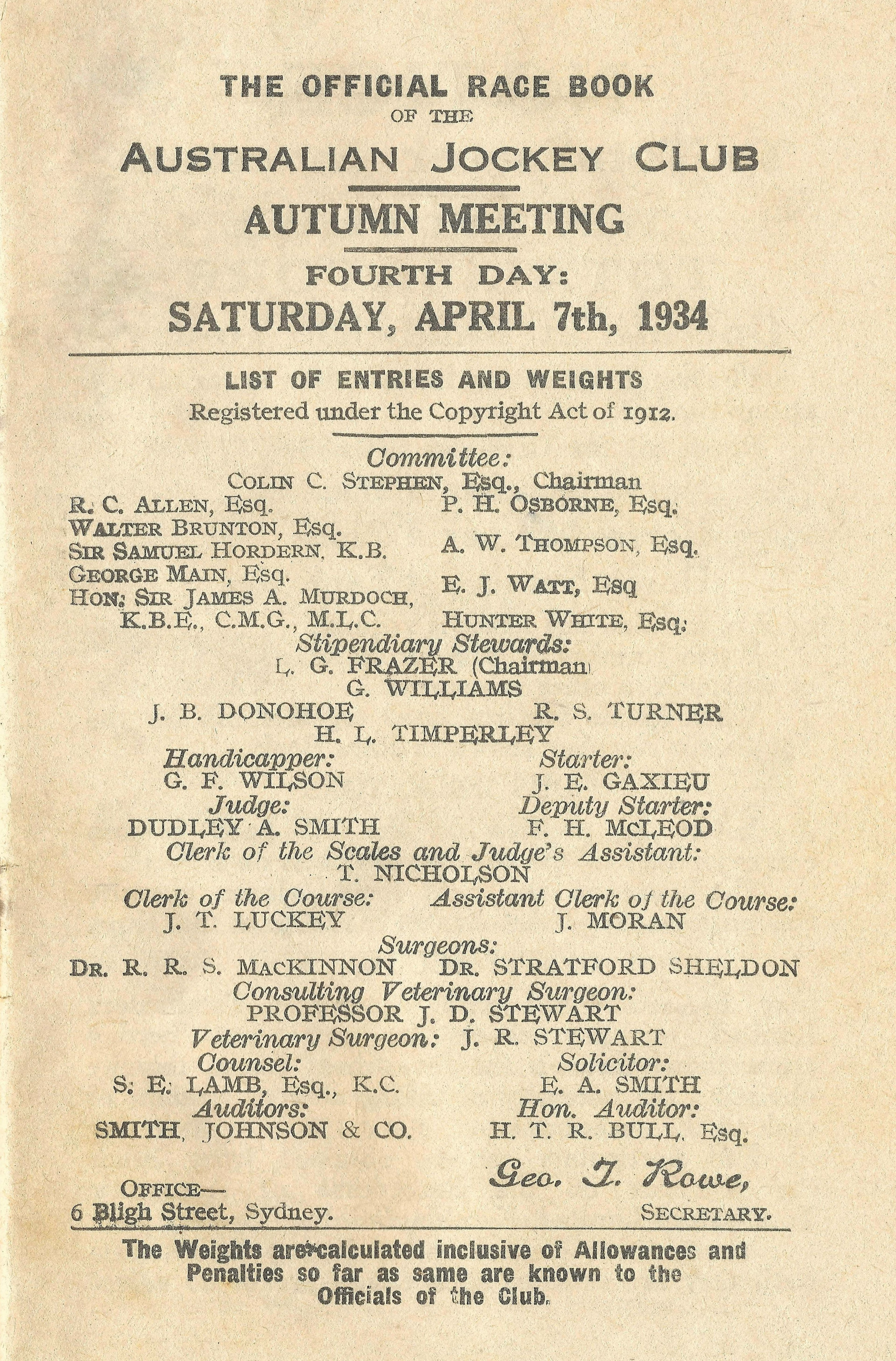
1934 AJC Kings Cup showing raceday officials

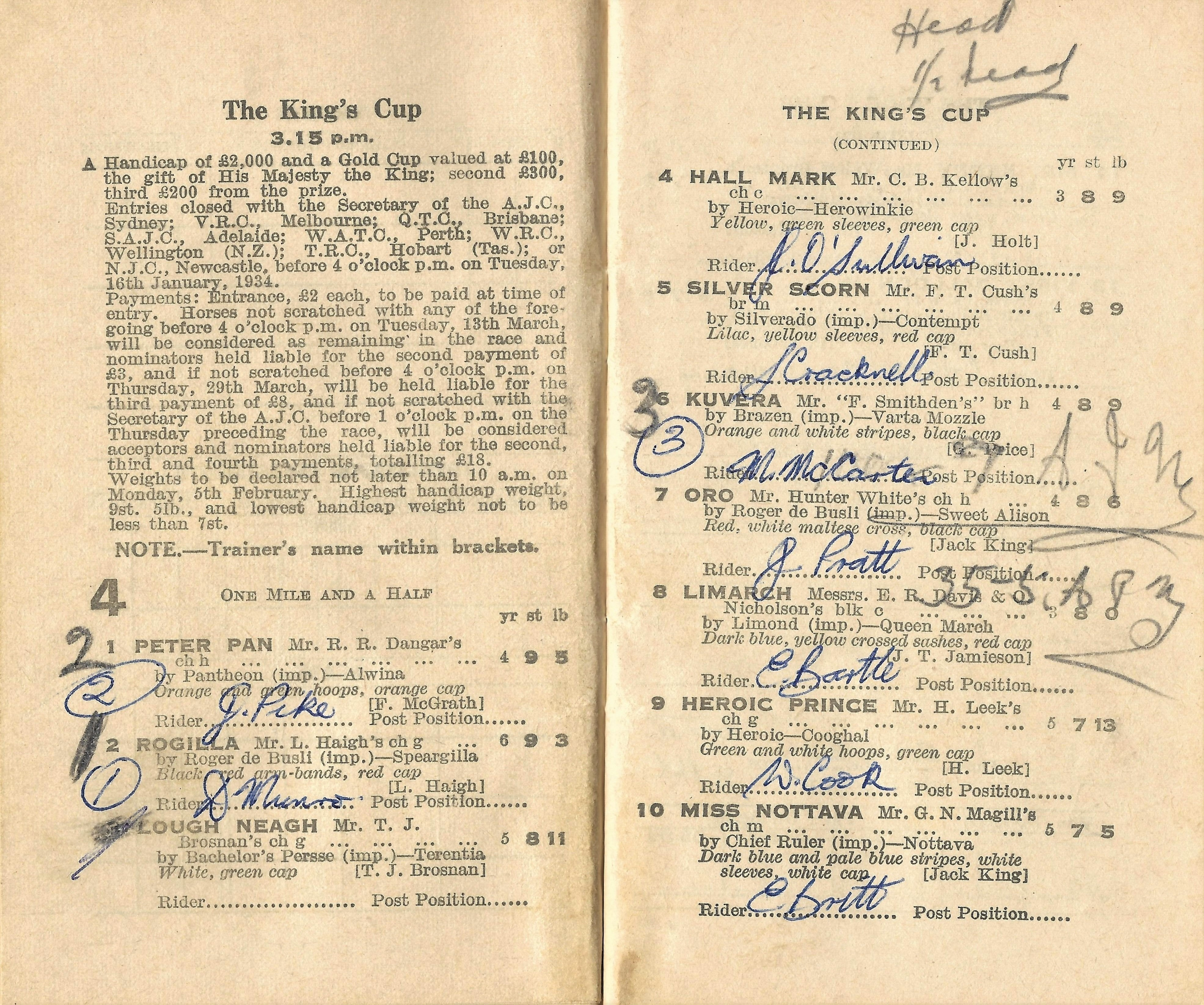
1934 AJC Kings Cup showing the winner, Rogilla

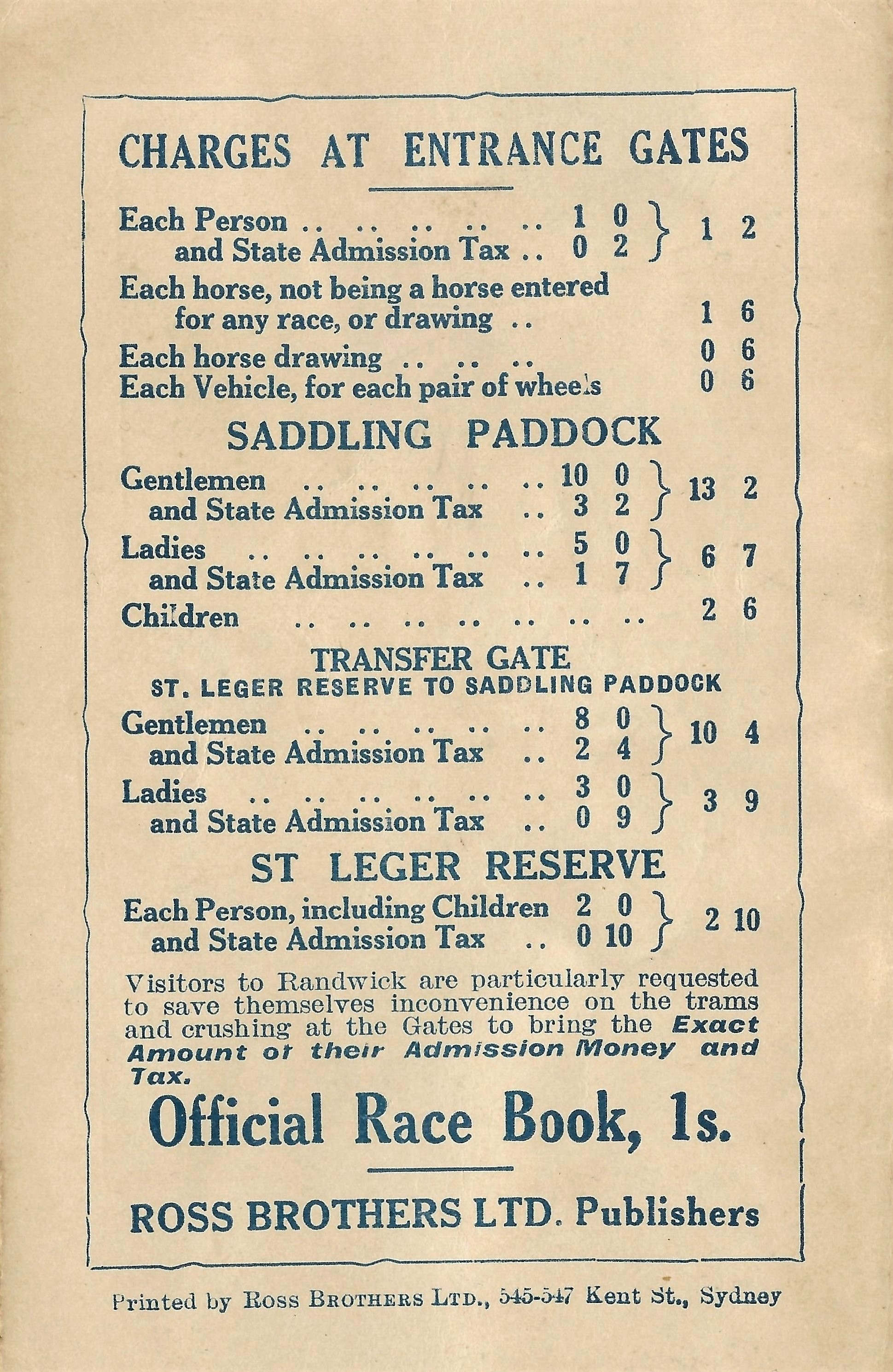
Back cover showing charges at the entrance gates

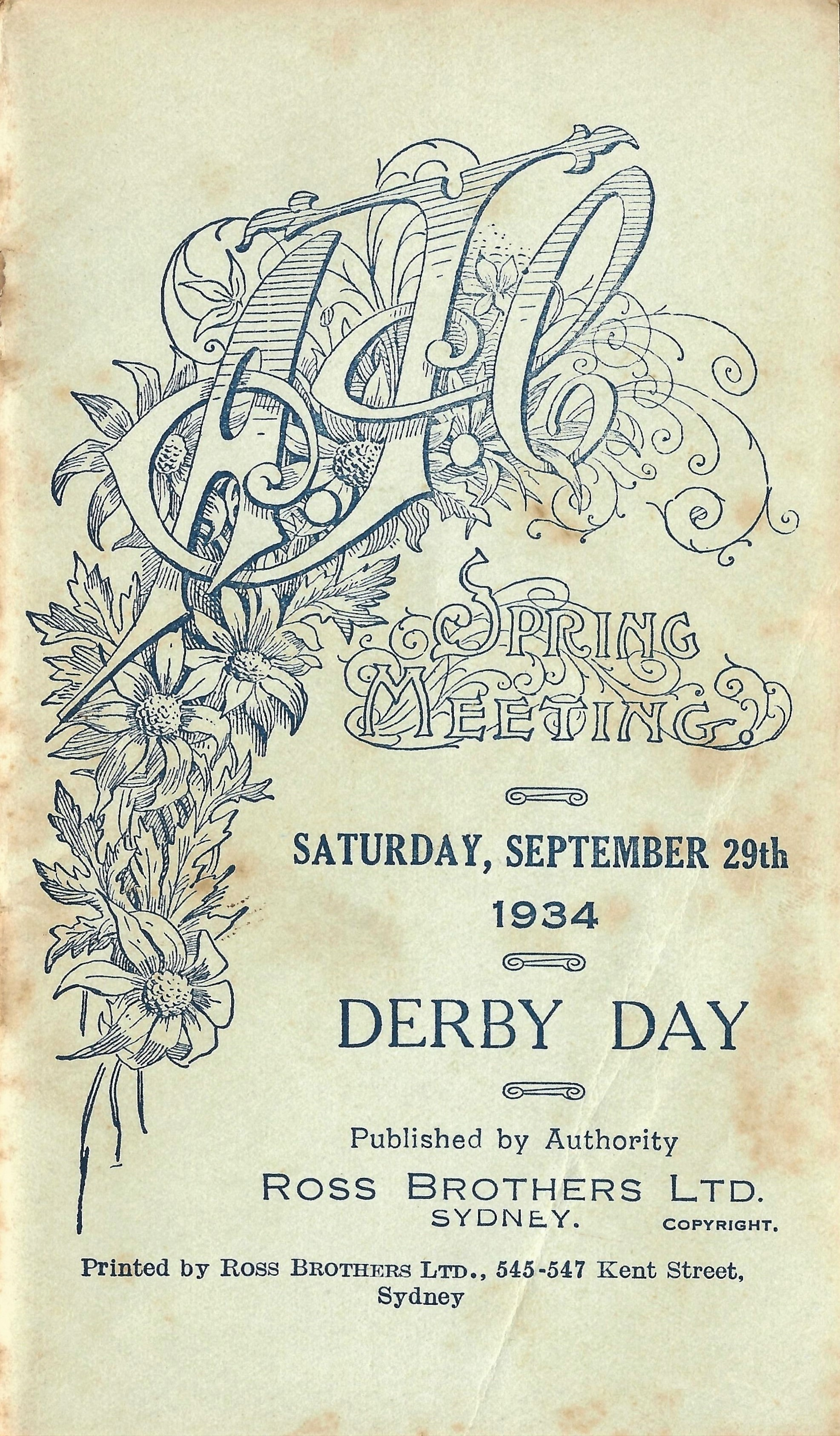
1934 AJC Spring Stakes racebook front cover

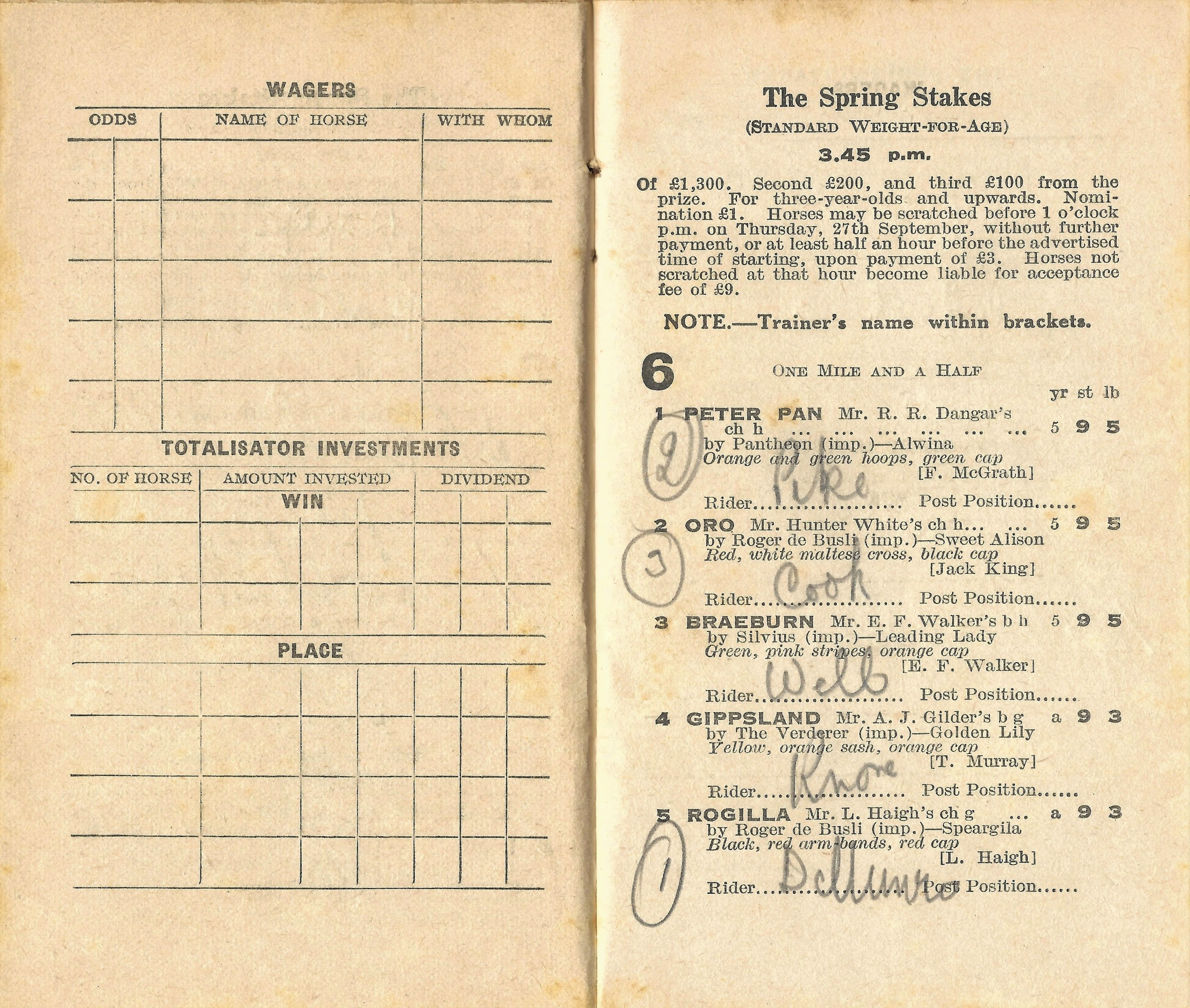
1934 AJC Spring Stakes showing the winner, Rogilla

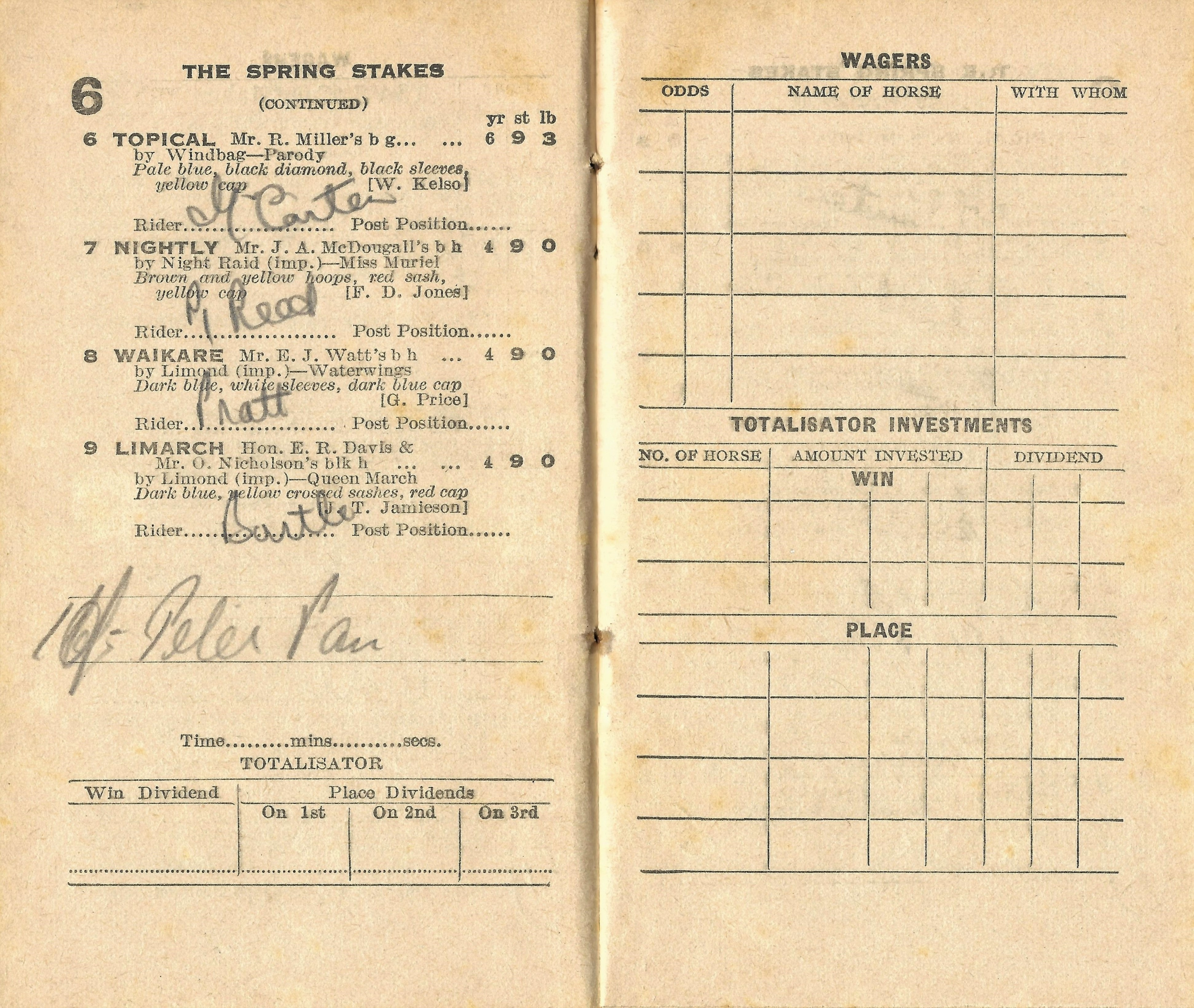
1934 AJC Spring Stakes starters and results

== Pedigree ==
Pedigree of Rogilla (AUS) (8) (Ch. g 1927)
Sire Roger de Busli (GB) Ch. 1920	Hurry On (GB) (2)	Marcovil (12)	Marco
Sire Roger de Busli (GB) Ch. 1920	Hurry On (GB) (2)	Marcovil (12)	Lady Villikins
Sire Roger de Busli (GB) Ch. 1920	Hurry On (GB) (2)	Tout Suite	Sainfoin
Sire Roger de Busli (GB) Ch. 1920	Hurry On (GB) (2)	Tout Suite	Star
Sire Roger de Busli (GB) Ch. 1920	St Genevieve	St. Amant (14)	St. Frusquin
Sire Roger de Busli (GB) Ch. 1920	St Genevieve	St. Amant (14)	Lady Loverule
Sire Roger de Busli (GB) Ch. 1920	St Genevieve	Gally Bawn	Gallinule
Sire Roger de Busli (GB) Ch. 1920	St Genevieve	Gally Bawn	Nat
Dam Speargila (AUS) (8) b. 1917	Brakespear (GB) (9)	Spearmint	Carbine (NZ)
Dam Speargila (AUS) (8) b. 1917	Brakespear (GB) (9)	Spearmint	Maid of the Mint
Dam Speargila (AUS) (8) b. 1917	Brakespear (GB) (9)	Guinea Hen	Gallinule
Dam Speargila (AUS) (8) b. 1917	Brakespear (GB) (9)	Guinea Hen	Nightmare
Dam Speargila (AUS) (8) b. 1917	Virgilia	Tartan (13)	Lochiel
Dam Speargila (AUS) (8) b. 1917	Virgilia	Tartan (13)	Colours
Dam Speargila (AUS) (8) b. 1917	Virgilia	Georgie	Clan Stuart (GB)
Dam Speargila (AUS) (8) b. 1917	Virgilia	Georgie	Butterfly (8)
