= Max Bonnell =

Australian lawyer and writer

Maxwell Thomas Bennett Bonnell (born 3 February 1962) is an Australian lawyer and cricket historian.

== Career ==
Max Bonnell attended Trinity Grammar School in Sydney (winning the Lawrence Campbell Oratory Competition in 1979) before studying Arts and Law at the University of Sydney. He also studied at the University of Warwick where he completed a master's degree in European Renaissance drama. He was appointed an adjunct professor of law at the University of Sydney in 2009.

He is a lawyer specialising in international arbitration. He was a partner in the Sydney office of the law firm King & Wood Mallesons for 18 years until he joined White & Case in 2017. In 2019 he joined the Sydney firm Henry William Lawyers. At the 2016 Australian ADR Awards, he was named International ADR Practitioner of the Year. He has acted as an Australian delegate to the United Nations Commission on International Trade Law. He was counsel for the successful claimant in White Industries v India, the first successful ISDS claim made against India.

He is a Fellow of the Chartered Institute of Arbitrators and a Fellow of the Australian Centre for International Commercial Arbitration. In 2020, he became one of the first arbitrators included in the Arbitrator Pool of the Court of Arbitration for Art.

Alongside his legal career Bonnell has been a prolific sports historian since he published Currency Lads in 2001, concentrating on Australian cricketers in the period between the mid-19th century and World War II. He has received the Jack Pollard Trophy, awarded for the best Australian book on cricket each year, three times (most recently for Black Swan Summer in 2023). He has also written a biography of John Walpole Willis, a 19th-century judge in New South Wales, as well as numerous articles for law journals. His writing on law, sport and theatre has appeared in several journals, including the Sydney Morning Herald and New Theatre Australia. He won NSW Cricket Association Media Awards for his writing on New South Wales cricket in both 1991-92 and 1992-93.

Bonnell played club cricket for Stourbridge in the Birmingham and District Premier League, for Warwick University in the Universities Athletic Union competition, and for Western Suburbs and Sydney University in Sydney Grade Cricket. He served as chairman of the board of the Sydney University Cricket Club. He was awarded a University Gold for cricket by Sydney Uni Sport and Fitness in 2017 and is a Life Member of the Sydney University Cricket Club and the Sydney Cricket Association.

== Books ==
- Making the Grade: 100 Years of Grade Cricket in Sydney, 1893/94 to 1993/94 (with Richard Cashman, James Rodgers and Ross Dundas, 1994)
- Currency Lads: The Life and Cricket of T. W. Garrett, R. C. Allen, S. P. Jones & R. J. Pope (2001)
- How Many More Are Coming?: The Short Life of Jack Marsh (2003)
- Summertime Blues: 150 Years of Sydney University Cricketers (with James Rodgers, 2006)
- Tibby Cotter: Fast Bowler, Larrikin, Anzac (with Andrew Sproul, 2012)
- Something Uncommon in the Flight: The Life of J. J. Ferris (2013)
- Golden Blues: Sydney University Cricket: 150 Years of the Club and its Players (with James Rodgers, 2014)
- Swift Underhand: John Kinloch and the Invention of Australian Cricket (2014)
- Lucky: The Life of H. L. "Bert" Collins, Cricketer, Soldier, Gambler (2015)
- I Like a Clamour: John Walpole Willis, Colonial Judge, Reconsidered (2017)
- Ebley Street Boys (2019; on Norman Callaway and Frank O'Keeffe)
- Dainty: The Story of Bert Ironmonger (2019)
- Boyhood Hero: The Sporting Life of J. M. Taylor (2019)
- First and Foremost a Cricketer: The Life of Dr Leslie Poidevin (2021)
- Black Swan Summer (with Andrew Sproul, 2022; on the 1947–48 Sheffield Shield)
- Three Days at Aigburth: Tom McKibbin's Match (2024)
- A Long Way To Go: The West Indies Cricket Team in Australia 1930–31 (2024)
- Ernest Parker: Not a Love Story (2024)
- Young Vic: The Early Life of Victor Trumper (2025)
- Brick by Brick: The Australian Cricketers in England 1964 (2025)
- Father Marriott's Summer Holidays (2025)
- Jack Walsh: The Conjurer (2026)
- Greville Stevens: The Prodigy (2026)

He has also contributed chapters to the books Australia: Sort of a Cricket Country (edited by Christian Ryan, 2011) and Rock Country (edited by Christian Ryan, 2013) and sections of the Oxford Companion to Australian Cricket (OUP, 1996), Wisden Cricketers' Almanack Australia (Hardie Grant Books) and Warne in Wisden (Bloomsbury, 2023).
