= Joseph Coates (cricketer) =

English cricketer

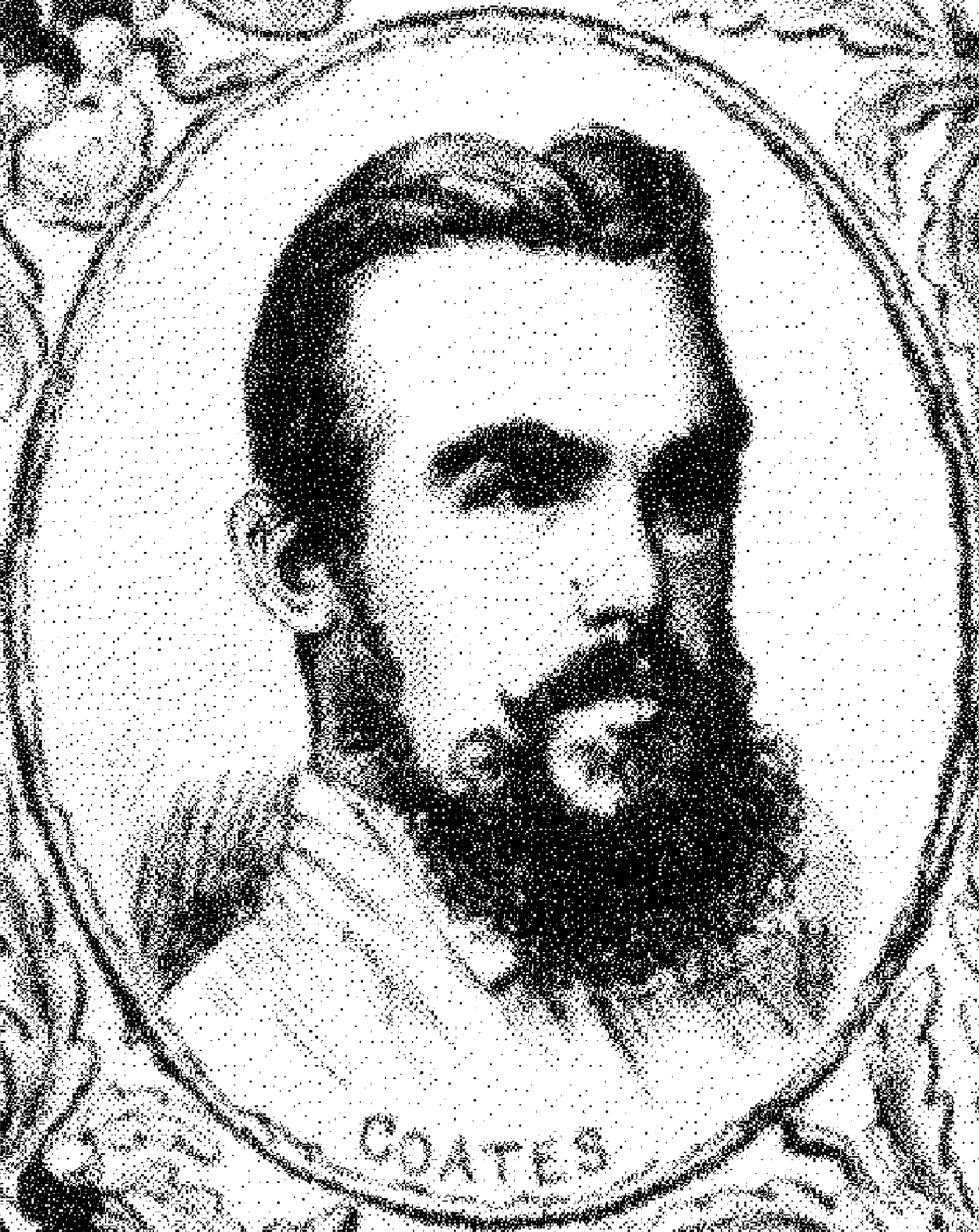

Personal information
- Full name: Joseph Coates
- Born: 13 November 1844; Huddersfield, Yorkshire, United Kingdom
- Died: 9 September 1896 (aged 51); Sydney, Australia
- Batting: Left-handed
- Bowling: Left-arm medium pace
- Role: Bowler/coach

Domestic team information
- Years: Team
- 1867/68–1879/80: New South Wales

Career statistics
| Competition | First-class |
|---|---|
| Matches | 15 |
| Runs scored | 158 |
| Batting average | 7.90 |
| 100s/50s | 0/0 |
| Top score | 36* |
| Balls bowled | 2550 |
| Wickets | 76 |
| Bowling average | 11.67 |
| 5 wickets in innings | 5 |
| 10 wickets in match | 1 |
| Best bowling | 7/39 |
| Catches/stumpings | 3/– |
- Source: Cricket Archive, 18 February 2012

Joseph Coates (13 November 1844 – 9 September 1896) was an English-born Australian schoolmaster and cricketer.

== Early life ==
Coates was born in Huddersfield, Yorkshire, England, the son of Joseph, a cordwainer, and his wife Ellen. While at Huddersfield College he gained medals for mathematics and classics and matriculated to the University of London.

== School master ==
Instead of taking up his university place, Coates sailed to New South Wales in 1864 and became an assistant master at the newly founded Newington College, Sydney. In 1873 he moved to Fort Street School and after serving in schools at West Maitland and William Street, Sydney he became headmaster of Fort Street in 1876. He served only six months at Fort Street before briefly visiting England, and in 1877 he succeeded Dr Michael Howe as headmaster of Newington.

During Coates's six years there Newington moved in 1880 from Silverwater to Stanmore and enrolments trebled. Under Coates's guidance the college established a high reputation for sport and for scholarship. He was the first captain in its cadet corps and in 1869 Newington became the first Australian school to play rugby union in a match against the University of Sydney. Coates played in both the Rugby and cricket teams and was an important influence on two Old Newingtonians who were early members of the Australia national cricket team – Tom Garrett and Edwin Evans.

In September 1883 Coates successfully applied for the headmastership of the newly founded Sydney Boys' High School. Of the six public high schools begun in 1883 only three survived their early years, and the success of Sydney Boys' High School was due in large measure to Coates's dedication, leadership and inspiration. Several country boys were able to attend the school only because he took them as boarders in his own home. Despite a reputation as a stern disciplinarian he was highly esteemed and respected by his pupils, who responded to his deep knowledge of boys and to his rare gift for teaching. In 1892 High moved from Elizabeth Street, Sydney to a new site at Ultimo.

Coates retired in June 1896. After two severe strokes he died at his home in Paddington. He was survived by his wife Rebekah, whom he had married in 1880, and by two of their three children.

== Cricketer ==
Much of Coates's prestige with the boys derived from his prowess as a sportsman. To him a school was much more than an academy, and both at Newington and at Sydney High he gave every encouragement to sport, arranging matches with other schools and outside bodies.

As captain of the New South Wales cricket team Coates played some 32 matches against other colonies and English touring teams. A sound batsman and fine slow bowler, he is credited with the introduction of the yorker in Australia. In the early stages of the planning for the first Australian tour of England in 1878, he was expected to be the team's captain. He was a founder and benefactor of the New South Wales Cricket Association and an original life member of the Sydney Cricket Ground.

== See also ==
- List of New South Wales representative cricketers

== Bibliography ==
- Dunlop, E.W. "A note on Joseph Coates", JRAHS, 54. Sydney, 1968.
- Macmillan, D.S. "Newington College 1863-1963". Sydney, 1963
- Swain, P.L. "Newington Across the Years 1893-1998". Sydney, 1999.
- Pollard, Jack, "Australian Cricket: 1803-1893', The Formative Years". Sydney, The Book Company, 1995. (ISBN 0-207-15490-2)
- Pollard, Jack, "Australian Cricket: The Game and the Players". Sydney, Hodder & Stoughton, 1982. (ISBN 0-340-28796-9)

| Preceded by Dr Michael Howe | Headmaster; Newington College; 1877–1883 | Succeeded by William Williams |
