= William Henry Williams (headmaster) =

English-born Australian headmaster and professor

William Henry Williams (7 November 1852 – 12 September 1941) was an English-born Australian headmaster and professor.

== Early life ==
Williams was born in Worcestershire, England, the son of a merchant's clerk. He attended a Grammar School in Newark and entered Trinity College, Cambridge, in 1872. He gained a foundation scholarship, an English declamation prize, the New Testament Greek prize and an exhibition and graduated with a first-class honours BA in 1876 and MA in 1879.

== Public School career ==
From 1880 until 1883, Williams was an assistant master and senior classics master at The Leys School, Cambridge. He married during his final teaching year at Leys. In 1884 he arrived in Australia and took up the headmastership of Newington College, Sydney. The school's authorities described him as 'essentially a scholar of liberal outlook' who broadened the curriculum in arts and science. In 1885 he established Newington's first science laboratory believing that education should include 'some of the graces and amenities of life without neglecting the realities'. In 1892 the College Council decided that the combined position of president and headmaster should be held by a clergyman and Williams resigned his post.

== University career ==
In 1894 Williams became a lecturer and in 1896 the foundation Professor of Classics and English Literature at the newly established University of Tasmania. He occupied the chair until his retirement in 1925. During part of that time he was Dean of the Faculty of Arts and served as a trustee of the State Library of Tasmania from 1921 to 1936. He died in Hobart, survived by his second wife and was buried with his first wife.

== Publications ==
Williams wrote no books, but he edited or wrote introductions to twenty-five publications. These included editions of Thackeray and Dryden, and notes on Twelfth Night, Macbeth, King Lear and The Tempest. He was an authority on Early Modern English. In addition to writing on Chaucer, Langland and Marlowe, he also edited classical texts.

== Personal life ==
Williams was a deacon at Davey Street Congregational Church.

== Legacy ==
According to Ralph Spaulding, Willams "contributed significantly to the University's survival and ultimate success".

Preceded by Joseph Coates	Headmaster; Newington College; 1884–1892	Succeeded by Arthur Lucas
