= J. J. Ferris =

Australian crickteter

John Ferris
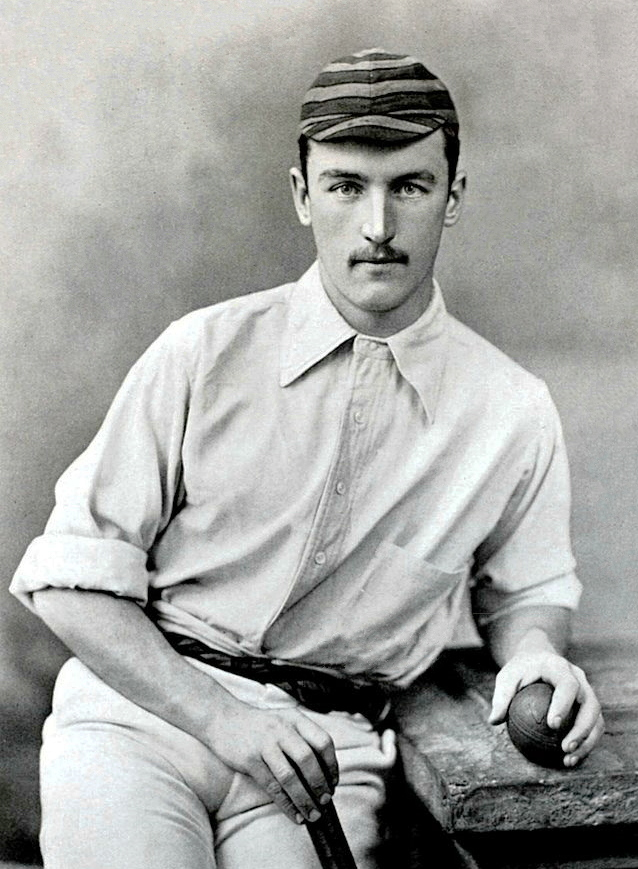
- Ferris in about 1895

Personal information
- Full name: John James Ferris
- Born: 21 June 1867; Sydney, Australia
- Died: 17 November 1900 (aged 33); Durban, Colony of Natal
- Batting: Left-handed
- Bowling: Left-arm medium-fast

International information
- National sides: Australia (1887–1890); England (1892)
- Test debut (cap 44/75): 28 January 1887; Australia v England
- Last Test: 22 March 1892; England v South Africa

Career statistics
Competition	Test	First-class
Matches	9	198
Runs scored	114	4,264
Batting average	8.76	15.67
100s/50s	0/0	1/15
Top score	20*	106
Balls bowled	2,302	38,396
Wickets	61	812
Bowling average	12.70	17.54
5 wickets in innings	6	63
10 wickets in match	1	11
Best bowling	7/37	8/41
Catches/stumpings	4/0	91/0
- Source: CricInfo, 12 December 2018

John James Ferris (21 May 1867 – 17 November 1900), a left-arm swing bowler, was one of the few cricketers to play Test cricket for more than one country.

Born in Sydney, Australia, Ferris made his first-class debut for New South Wales against Alfred Shaw's touring English team on his home ground in 1886/87. He took seven wickets in the match, including five in the second innings, and after several more good displays was selected for the first Test, also at Sydney. The England first innings was a disaster as they collapsed to what remains their lowest Test total of 45 all out, Ferris bowling unchanged with Charlie Turner. But despite his nine wickets in the game England, inspired by Billy Barnes' second-innings 6–28, scraped to a 13-run win.

Ferris took another nine-wicket haul in the second Test, but again England was victorious, though in the only Test of the 1887/88 tour he could manage "only" six as the Englishmen came out on top yet again. He went with the Australians to England in 1888, and at Lord's for the first time in his career playing in a winning Test team, his partnership with Turner accounting for no less than eighteen England wickets as Australia recorded a 61-run win (W. G. Grace wrote later that the tourists had "brought with them the finest pair of bowlers Australia could ever boast"). The Ashes remained in England, however, as the home team won the other two Tests. In 1889, Ferris was named as one of the first Wisden Cricketers of the Year.

He went to England again in 1890, taking 13 wickets in another series defeat and no less than 186 in the season as a whole, but then moved there permanently, playing a single Test for his adopted country against South Africa in 1891/92. Coincidentally, his former Australian teammate Billy Murdoch also made his first England appearance in this match, which was not given Test status until some time later. Ferris' performance helped crush the home team by an innings and 189 runs, but it was to prove his final international appearance. He had taken 61 Test wickets at an average of just 12.70; only George Lohmann had a better career average.

Ferris played several seasons of county cricket (1892–1895) with Gloucestershire, for whom he scored his only hundred in 1893 but was otherwise something of a failure. At the end of his career, he appeared in a single Sheffield Shield match for South Australia in 1895/96, opening the batting but making nought, then finally in 1897/98 in two more games for New South Wales. In his last match, he made a half-century but did not bowl a single ball.

Completed Test career bowling averages (Note: Qualification: 10 wickets, career completed.)
Bowler	Average
Charles Marriott (ENG)	8.72
Frederick Martin (ENG)	10.07
George Lohmann (ENG)	10.75
Laurie Nash (AUS)	12.60
John Ferris (AUS/ENG)	12.70
Tom Horan (AUS)	13.00
Harry Dean (ENG)	13.90
Albert Trott (AUS/ENG)	15.00
Mike Procter (SA)	15.02
Jack Iverson (AUS)	15.23
Tom Kendall (AUS)	15.35
Alec Hurwood (AUS)	15.45
Billy Barnes (ENG)	15.54
John Trim (WI)	16.16
Billy Bates (ENG)	16.42

Ferris enlisted in the British Army for the Second Boer War, but died at Durban, South Africa at the age of 33.

It was reported, and for many years believed, that Ferris died from “enteric fever” (typhoid), but recent research by Max Bonnell established that he died suddenly after a seizure while travelling on a tram, shortly after his dishonourable discharge from the army. The reasons for his discharge, and the precise cause of his death, are not known.

== See also ==
- List of cricketers who have played for more than one international team
