= Mike Coward =

Australian cricket writer

Michael John Coward AM (born 1946) is an Australian journalist and cricket writer.

== Life and career ==
Mike Coward grew up in Adelaide. After leaving school he became a copy boy at the Adelaide News in December 1963 and was promoted to cadet journalist in September 1964. He qualified as a journalist in March 1967. He spent three years working for Australian Associated Press in London, then returned to Australia to become a full-time sports journalist. He was the chief cricket writer for the Adelaide Advertiser, then The Sydney Morning Herald from 1984 to 1989, and was then a columnist for The Australian for many years.

He has twice won the Jack Pollard Trophy, which is awarded for the best Australian book on cricket each year: in 1991 for Cricket Beyond the Bazaar, about cricket between Australia and India, and in 1995 for Australia vs the New South Africa: Cricket Contact Renewed. He received the Lifetime Achievement Award from the Australian Sports Commission in November 2015. He was awarded the AM in the 2016 Queen's Birthday Honours "For significant service to the print and broadcast media as a journalist, commentator, author and historian, and to cricket."

In recent years he has worked at the International Cricket Hall of Fame in Bowral, where he has overseen the establishment of the interview archive. He conducted many of the interviews himself, with some of the greatest Test cricketers since the Second World War.

== Books ==
- Red and Blue Blooded (1978)
- The Wit of Walker (by Max Walker with Mike Coward, 1983)
- Cricket Beyond the Bazaar (1990)
- Caribbean Odyssey: Australia and Cricket in the West Indies (1991)
- Men of Norwood: The Red and Blue Blooded (1994)
- Australia vs the New South Africa: Cricket Contact Renewed (1994)
- Slats Opens Up: Inside the World of Michael Slater (by Michael Slater with Mike Coward, 1997)
- Sir Donald Bradman A.C. (edited, 1998)
- Calypso Summer (2000)
- The Chappell Years: Cricket in the '70s (2002)
- Rookies, Rebels and Renaissance: Cricket in the '80s (2004)
- The Baggy Green: The Pride, Passion and History of Australia's Sporting Icon (with Michael Fahey, 2008)
- A Century of Achievement: The Players and People of the St George DCC (2010)
- Champions: The World's Greatest Cricketers Speak (interviews, 2013)
- The Bradman Museum's World of Cricket (2015)
- Cricket's Forgotten Pioneer: The Frank Tarrant Story (2020)
- Warne Worn: The Baggy Green that Rallied Australia (2020)
