= Australian Cricket Society =

Literary group

The Australian Cricket Society is a fraternity of cricket lovers with branches in New South Wales, Queensland, South Australia and Tasmania. It was established in Melbourne, Victoria, in 1967. As of 2016 Ricky Ponting serves as patron.

== Activities ==
Guest speakers at its Annual Dinners come from the 'Who's Who' of the cricketing world. Down through the years, they've included Sir Donald Bradman, Lindsay Hassett, Bill Lawry and more recently, Ian Healy, Dean Jones, Damien Fleming, Justin Langer and Barry Richards. The Society supports youth and grassroots cricket through its Young Cricketer (male and female) and sponsorship of emerging talent through the Elite Cricket Academy.

== Publications ==
Each summer the Society publishes its flagship magazine, Pavilion, edited by Ken Piesse - a 48-page production with articles by renowned cricket writers and a forum for members and friends. The Cricket Society Scoresheet quarterly news bulletin edited by Wayne Ross keeps members informed of upcoming events.

== Jack Pollard Trophy ==
In order to encourage cricket writing in Australia, in 1984 Jack Pollard donated a trophy to be awarded by the Australian Cricket Society to the author of the best Australian cricket book published over the previous 12 months. It is sometimes called the Jack Pollard Literary Award or the Australian Cricket Society Literary Award.

| Year | Winning author | Title |
|---|---|---|
| 1984 | Michael Page | Bradman: The Illustrated Biography |
| 1985 | Richard Cashman | 'Ave a Go, Yer Mug!: Australian Cricket Crowds from Larrikin to Ocker |
| 1986 | Phil Derriman | True to the Blue: A History of the New South Wales Cricket Association |
| 1987 | Chris Harte | The History of the Sheffield Shield |
| 1988 | Jack McHarg | Stan McCabe: The Man and His Cricket |
| 1989 | Chris Harte | Two Tours and Pollock: The Australians in South Africa 1985–87 |
| 1990 | Richard Cashman | The "Demon" Spofforth |
| 1991 | Mike Coward | Cricket Beyond the Bazaar |
| 1994 | Gideon Haigh | The Cricket War: The Inside Story of Kerry Packer's World Series Cricket |
| 1995 | Mike Coward | Australia vs the New South Africa: Cricket Contact Renewed |
| 1998 | Gideon Haigh | The Summer Game: Australian Test Cricket 1949–71 |
| 2000 | Gideon Haigh | Mystery Spinner: The Story of Jack Iverson |
| 2002 | Gideon Haigh | The Big Ship: Warwick Armstrong and the Making of Modern Cricket |
| 2003 | Mike Colman and Ken Edwards | Eddie Gilbert: The True Story of an Aboriginal Cricketing Legend |
| 2004 | Max Bonnell | How Many More Are Coming?: The Short Life of Jack Marsh |
| 2006 | Alf Batchelder | Pavilions in the Park: A History of the Melbourne Cricket Club and its Ground |
| 2008 | Gideon Haigh and David Frith | Inside Story: Unlocking Australian Cricket's Archives |
| 2009 | Greg de Moore | Tom Wills |
| 2010 | Alf Batchelder | Hugh Trumble: A Cricketer's Life |
| 2011 | Rick Smith | Blighted Lives: The Story of Harry and Albert Trott |
| 2012 | Max Bonnell and Andrew Sproul | Tibby Cotter: Fast Bowler, Larrikin, Anzac |
| 2013 | Gideon Haigh | On Warne |
| 2015 | Daniel Brettig | Whitewash to Whitewash: Australian Cricket's Years of Struggle and Summer of Riches |
| 2016 | Elliot Cartledge and Tim Lane | Chasing Shadows: The Life and Death of Peter Roebuck |
| 2017 | Gideon Haigh | Stroke of Genius: Victor Trumper and the Shot That Changed Cricket |
| 2018 | Denis Brien | All the Kings' Men: A History of the Hindmarsh Cricket Club |
| 2019 | Richard Cashman and Ric Sissons | Billy Murdoch, Cricketing Colossus |
| 2020 | Greg Growden | Cricketers at War: Cricket Heroes Who Fought for Australia in Battle |
| 2022 | Peter Lloyd | Warren Bardsley: The First Mr Cricket |
| 2023 | Max Bonnell and Andrew Sproul | Black Swan Summer |
| 2024 | Peter Schofield and Ric Sissons | When the Kangaroo Met the Eagle: The 1913 Australian tour of Canada and the United States |

NB: The trophy is not awarded every year.

== Veterans cricket ==
The ACS Melbourne Wandering XI plays up to 10 friendlies each season against like-minded players from the MCC XXIX Club, Lords Taverners and the Supreme Court of Victoria. The Society is a founding member of Veterans Cricket Victoria. fielding Over 60 and 70 year old teams in the Victoria state wide competition and end of season carnival at Echuca. ACS players have represented Victoria at National Over 60s, Over 65s, Over 70s and Over 75s Championships with 4 ACS members selected to play for Veterans Cricket Australia since 2009.

The Society has been a regular participant in Golden Oldies, Vintage Cricket carnivals and Exotic Cricket Tours around the world and has hosted like-minded overseas touring teams visiting Australia since 1996.
