= Gideon Haigh =

Australian journalist and non-fiction author

- Born: Gideon Clifford Jeffrey Davidson Haight; 29 December 1965 (age 60); London, England, UK
- Occupation: Journalist
- Years active: 1984–present
- Known for: Editor of Wisden Cricketers' Almanack Australia
- Relatives: Sir Rupert Oakley Shoobridge (great-grandfather) Louis Shoobridge Sr. (great-great-grandfather) Ebenezer Shoobridge (great-great-great-grandfather)

Gideon Clifford Jeffrey Davidson Haigh (born 29 December 1965) is an Australian journalist and non-fiction author who writes about sport (especially cricket), business and crime in Australia. He was born in London, was raised in Geelong, and lives in Melbourne.

== Career ==
Haigh began his career as a journalist, writing on business for The Age newspaper from 1984 to 1992 and for The Australian from 1993 to 1995. He has since contributed to over 70 newspapers and magazines, both on business topics and on sport, mostly cricket. He wrote regularly for The Guardian during the 2006–07 Ashes series and has featured also in The Times and the Financial Times. He was senior cricket writer for The Australian, with his final column published at the conclusion of the 2023 Ashes series.

Haigh has authored 51 books and edited seven more. Of those on a cricketing theme, his historical works includes The Cricket War and Summer Game. He has written two biographies, The Big Ship (of Warwick Armstrong) and Mystery Spinner (of Jack Iverson); the latter was The Cricket Society's "Book of the Year", short-listed for the William Hill Sports Book of the Year and dubbed "a classic" by The Sunday Times; anthologies of his writings Ashes 2005 and Game for Anything, as well as Many a Slip (the humorous diary of a club cricket season) and The Vincibles, his story of the South Yarra Cricket Club of which he is a life member and perennial vice-president and for whose newsletter he has written about cricket the longest. He has also published several books on business-related topics, such as The Battle for BHP, Asbestos House (which details the James Hardie asbestos controversy) and Bad Company, an examination of the CEO phenomenon. He mostly publishes with Aurum Press. He has won the annual Jack Pollard Trophy for the best Australian cricket book six times.

Haigh was appointed editor of the Wisden Cricketers' Almanack Australia for 1999–2000 and 2000–01. Since March 2006, he has been a regular panellist on the ABC television sports panel show Offsiders. He was also a regular co-host on The Conversation Hour with Jon Faine on 774 ABC Melbourne until near the end of 2006.

Haigh has been critical of what he regards as the deification of Sir Donald Bradman and "the cynical exploitation of his name by the mediocre and the greedy". He did so in a September 1998 article in Wisden Cricket Monthly entitled "Sir Donald Brandname". Haigh has been critical of Bradman's biographer Roland Perry, writing in The Australian that Perry's biography was guilty of "glossing over or ignoring anything to Bradman's discredit".

Haigh won the John Curtin Prize for Journalism in the Victorian Premier's Literary Awards in 2006 for his essay "Information Idol: How Google is making us stupid", which was published in The Monthly magazine. He asserted that the quality of discourse could suffer as a source of information's worth is judged by Google according to its previous degree of exposure to the status quo. He believes the pool of information available to those using Google as their sole avenue of inquiry is inevitably limited and possibly compromised due to covert commercial influences.

Haigh blogged on the 2009 Ashes series for The Wisden Cricketer.

Haigh addressed the tenth Bradman Oration in Melbourne on 24 October 2012. He delivered the inaugural Jack Marsh History Lecture in 2015 at the Sydney Cricket Ground on "How Victor Trumper Changed Cricket Forever".

Haigh was co-presenter of the Cricket, Et Cetera podcast for The Australian with fellow cricket journalist Peter Lalor; however, The Australian management ended both presenters' involvement with the podcast when Haigh left the newspaper after the 2023 Ashes series. Lalor and Haigh have reunited their partnership in a new independent podcast and Substack website called Cricket Et Al.

In March 2024, Haigh was flown to Israel by the Australia/Israel & Jewish Affairs Council (AIJAC), and wrote about his experiences there in an essay entitled "Highways to a war".

Haigh co-wrote Josh Frydenberg's memoir A Grateful Son which released in 2026.

== Personal life ==
Haigh was a resident at Trinity College from 1984, although he did not study at university. Haigh lives in Melbourne with his family. Haigh's partner from 2002 to 2005 was Sally Warhaft, who edited The Monthly until April 2009. Haigh stated that he would not write for The Monthly after Warhaft's controversial departure.
