= A Grateful Son =

2026 book by Josh Frydenberg

- Authors: Josh Frydenberg and Gideon Haigh
- Subject: Memoir
- Publisher: HarperCollins
- Publication date: 13 October 2026
- Media type: Print and digital
- Pages: 368
- ISBN: 978-1-460-76511-1
- Website: harpercollins.com.au/products/9781460765111

A Grateful Son is a 2026 memoir by former Australian politician and treasurer Josh Frydenberg. Frydenberg wrote the book with support from Gideon Haigh.

== Launch ==
The book was launched on 13 October 2026 in Sydney with former Prime Minister John Howard. A second launch took place on 14 October with prominent people including former Premier of Victoria Jeff Kennett, Liberal powerbroker Michael Kroger, Victorian Liberal Party deputy leader David Southwick, Victorian Liberal MLC Georgie Crozier, former state Liberal MP Michael O'Brien among others in attendance. Frydenberg also promoted his book at the Wheeler Centre in Melbourne on 22 October, at an event for the Mount Scopus Foundation with The Age's state political editor Chip Le Grand, and at the Jewish Museum of Australia on 29 October. Book launches were also held in Brisbane with Premier David Crisafulli, Western Australia with Premier Roger Cook and in South Australia with Alexander Downer.

== Content ==
The book touches on Frydenberg's Jewish family history, education and touches on his stint as a competitive tennis player. The book mentions light-hearted moments in politics such as Frydenberg's staff playing pranks on him and constituent emails evaluating his aesthetic shortcomings. Frydenberg mentions his time as a staffer in the offices of attorney-general Daryl Williams, foreign minister Alexander Downer and Howard during the late 1990s–2000s. He also details his ministerial and political career.

== Reception ==
Journalists and commentators speculated that Frydenberg wanted to return to politics and lead the Liberal Party upon the release of his book and his appearance on multiple TV, radio and podcast interviews.
