= Havilah, New South Wales =

Locality in New South Wales

Coordinates: 32.622°S 149.765°E

Havilah is an Australian bounded rural locality and a grazing property. It is located 13 km from Mudgee on the Lue Road and has the postcode 2850. The locality also has a limestone and carbonates quarry.

== Farm and homestead ==
Havilah took its name after a visiting clergyman discovered specks of gold and, citing Genesis, named the area the "land of Havilah". The farm was first owned by Nicholas Paget Bayly (1814–1879) and was sold after his death to Henry Charles White (1837–1905). The farm is renowned for a history of producing high quality merino sheep and horses. The homestead has major additions designed by architect John Horbury Hunt.

== Memorial church ==
Havilah Memorial Church was built in 1905 and gifted to the Anglican Church by Hunter White (1867–1947) in memory of his father, Henry Charles White. It lies on the Lue road and has an adjacent small cemetery.

== Literary connection ==
Havilah appears as 'Haviland' and H.C. White as 'Old Black' in Henry Lawson's story 'Joe Wilson's courtship'.
