= Jack Pollard =

Australian sports journalist, writer and cricket historian (1926 – 2002)

- Born: 31 July 1926; Sydney, Australia
- Died: 25 May 2002 (aged 75); Sydney, Australia
- Citizenship: Australia
- Occupations: Writer & journalist
- Known for: Sports journalist, writer, cricket historian
- Awards: Medal of the Order of Australia

Jack Ernest Pollard OAM (31 July 1926 – 25 May 2002) was an Australian sports journalist, writer and cricket historian.

== Early life ==
Born in Sydney on 31 July 1926, Pollard began his journalism career in 1943 as a copy boy at Sydney's Daily Telegraph newspaper. At the age of 18, he was called up to the Australian Army, serving from 1944 to 1947 and finishing with the rank of sergeant. A foot injury sustained during an army rugby game saw him sit out nine months at Holsworthy Barracks. The injury may have saved Pollard's life as the other men of his assigned platoon were later killed in action in New Guinea.

== Journalism career ==
From 1945 to 1947, Pollard lived in post-war Japan working as a sports editor for the armed forces newspaper there. He returned to Sydney briefly, then moved to England, where he worked as a horse racing writer for a newspaper in Sheffield.

In 1948, he started work as a correspondent for the Australian Associated Press in London which included a regular column, sometimes serious, other times humorous.

He covered many major sporting events, including the 1948 Summer Olympics, ten Wimbledon Championships and the 1948 tour of England by Don Bradman's Australian cricket team.

== Publishing career ==
Pollard returned to Sydney in 1956, where he worked as a sports reporter with the Telegraph before starting his own publishing company in 1959, Jack Pollard Publishing, which specialised in books on sport and leisure topics. Pollard was a prolific writer and editor, who produced a large number of sporting reference books, including a definitive five-volume history of Australian cricket, encyclopaedias on rugby union, golf, horse racing and a series of popular fishing guides. He also wrote biographies for several sports stars including tennis players Lew Hoad and Rod Laver, cricketer Keith Miller and umpire Lou Rowan, golfer Bruce Devlin, rugby league players Ken Thornett and Johnny Raper, and VFL player Peter McKenna.

== Books on cricket ==
Although Pollard's works included all Australian sports, it is his cricket writing that is considered an important part of his legacy. Books include such topics as:

- The history of Australian cricket
- Cricket statistics
- The "Australian way" of playing cricket

== Retirement ==
Pollard retired from publishing in 1981 to concentrate on writing.

He died on 25 May 2002, after suffering a stroke upon his return to Sydney from a research trip in Melbourne.

== Honours ==
- 1983: English Cricket Society's Jubilee Award
- 12 December 1990: General member of the Sport Australia Hall of Fame
- 8 June 1992: Medal of the Order of Australia for service to sports journalism and sporting history

The Jack Pollard Trophy is awarded annually by the Australian Cricket Society for the leading Australian cricket book published over the previous 12 months.
