= Wyvern House =

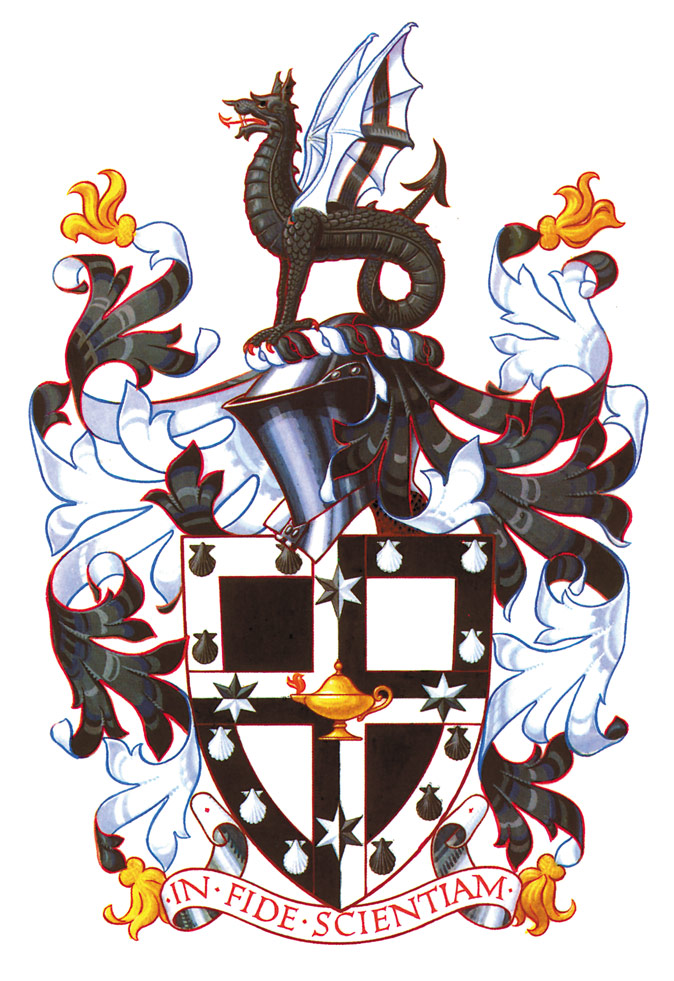

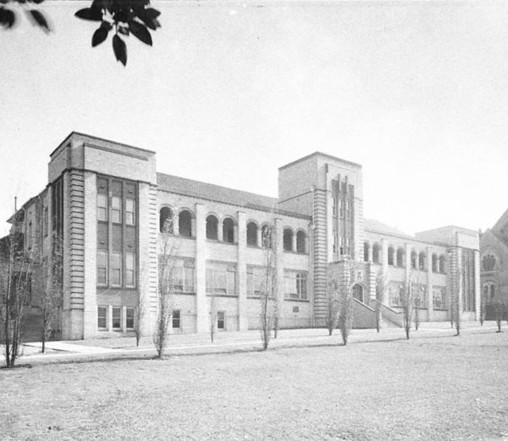
- Wyvern House 1938–1998

Location
- 115 Cambridge Street; Stanmore; Sydney, New South Wales; Australia; 33°53′43″S 151°09′59″E

Information
- Type: Independent single-sex primary day school
- Motto: Latin: In Fide Scientiam (To Our Faith Add Knowledge)
- Denomination: Uniting Church in Australia
- Established: 1938; 88 years ago
- Founder: Philip Le Couteur
- Educational authority: NSW Department of Education
- Headmaster: Benjamin Barrington-Higgs
- Years: K–6
- Gender: Boys
- Enrolment: 478 (2011)
- Colours: Black and white
- Website: www.newingtoncollege.nsw.edu.au

Wyvern House (abbreviated as Wyvern) is one of the two independent Uniting Church single-sex primary day schools for boys of Newington College, that is located at 115 Cambridge Street, Stanmore, an Inner West suburb of Sydney, New South Wales, Australia. The other primary school is located at Lindfield, on Sydney's North Shore. Both schools are commonly called preparatory schools.

Wyvern has a non-selective enrolment policy and currently caters for approximately 478 boys from Year K to Year 6. The main point of entry is at Year K, where there are 40 students, with another class intake at Year 3 and Year 5.

== History ==
The Wesleyan Collegiate Institute opened at Newington House, Silverwater, on Thursday 16 July 1863, with 16 students aged from seven years of age – so, Newington College, as the school soon became known, has educated primary school aged boys from its foundation. A bequest, by John Jones, of land at Stanmore, saw the college move to the newly fashionable inner-city suburbs of Sydney in 1880. The Rev. Charles John Prescott, as president and headmaster of Newington, wanted to give greater emphasis to preparatory education at the college and by 1903 an identifiable preparatory school, organisationally separate from the senior school, had been established. It was housed in a small building on the college's southern boundary. Twenty years after Prescott's arrival at Stanmore a purpose-built prep was first opened. This was made possible by the 1921 bequest of £10,000 by Sir Samuel McCaughey.

By 1937 the McCaughey building was considered inadequate and the then headmaster, Philip Le Couteur, pushed for the construction of a new building for junior education and he is seen as the founder of the present day Wyvern House. The Old Newingtonian architect Lt Col Alfred Warden designed the building and it was inaugurated on 7 October 1938. A major benefactor to the project was Fred Cull and he unveiled a commemorative stone which read: "This House was erected by those who desire for boys a fuller life." The first Wyvern boys started on day one of the new year when an old boy, Sir Percival Halse Rogers, was invited to open the front door with a specially-made gold key.

On its opening, Wyvern had dormitory accommodation for fifty prep boarders. Twenty years later Wyvern boarding accommodation had been expanded and there were eighty boys in residence. In 1973 thirty-seven boys were boarders, ranging in age from eight to twelve, but by 1979 there were only three boys in residence and they were housed in the senior school and the former dormitories were converted to an infants department.

From 1939 Wyvern House boys wore a straw boater with a black hat-band until this was replaced by a black cloth cap in 1976. Both items of headwear bore an heraldic Wyvern – the emblem of Newington College.

Wyvern held a separate Speech Night for the first time in 1946. From 1957 Wyvern had a brother school when Newington opened an additional preparatory school on the North Shore – first at Killara, subsequently related to Lindfield. In the same year, Wyvern House was the first Australian prep school to undertake an international Rugby tour, when it visited New Zealand. From the 1950s until the 1970s the Wyvern House choir under the direction of Joan Gray achieved distinction in the Sydney Eisteddfod and boys were prepared for participation in performances by the Australian Elizabethan Theatre Trust and The Australian Opera.

An exchange program was initiated in 1975 between Wyvern and La Verne Heights Elementary School in Los Angeles. During the 125th anniversary of Newington, Wyvern celebrated its Silver Jubilee.

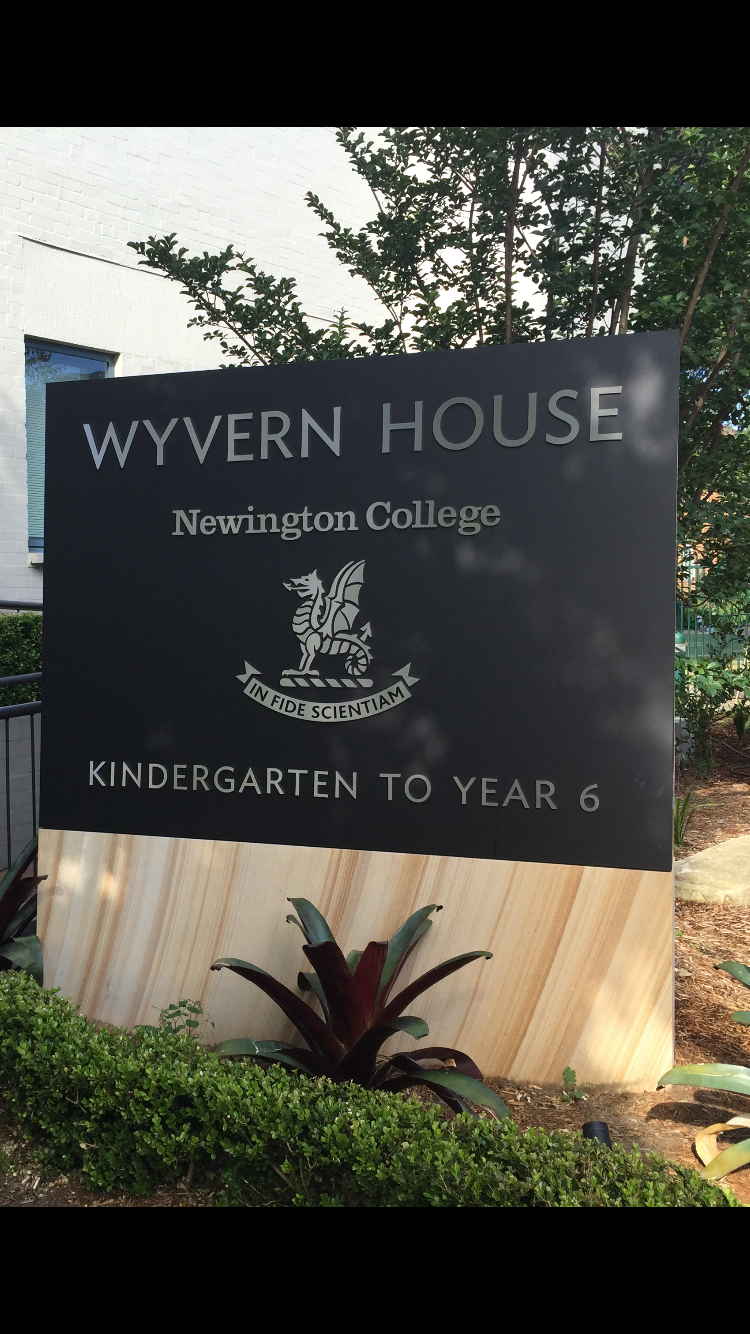
Wyvern House entrance

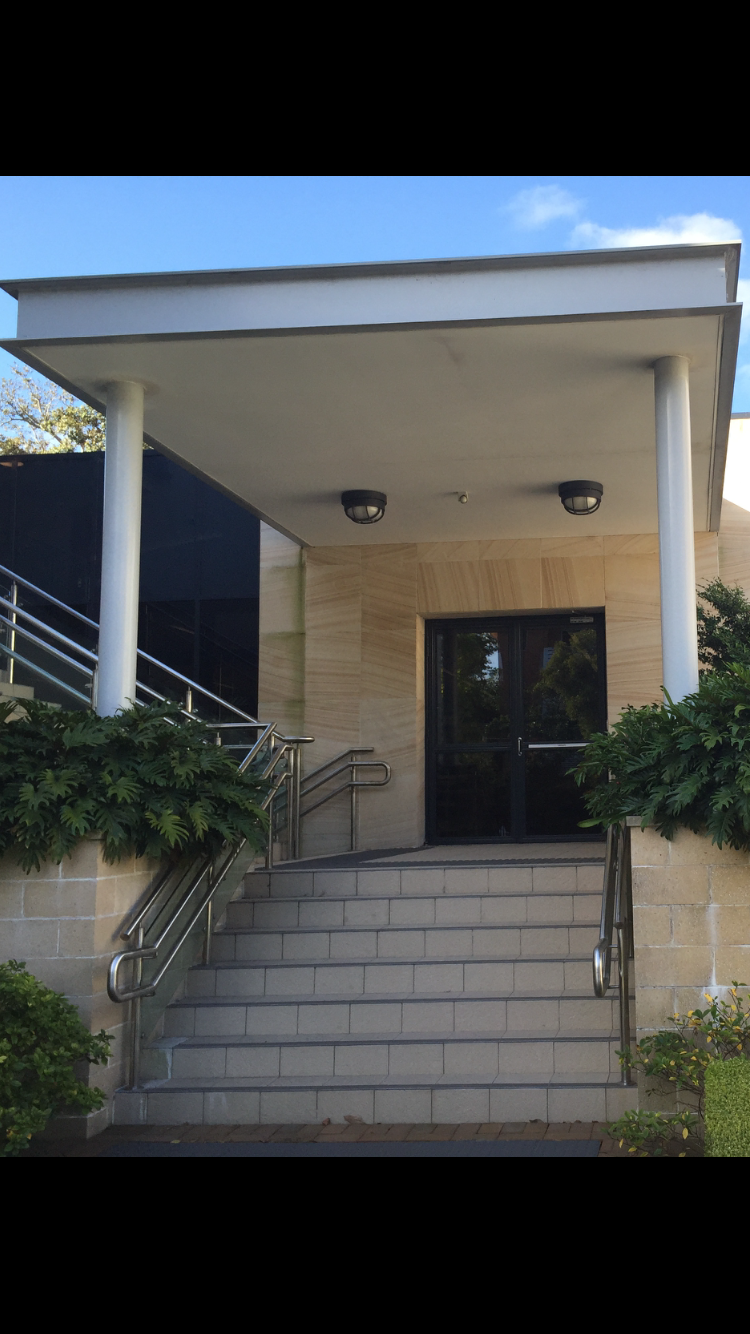
Wyvern House library

In 1995 the Adult Deaf Society Headquarters in Cambridge Street, Stanmore, were purchased for the relocation of Wyvern to a stand-alone campus. In that year enrolments had grown to 347 and by 1997 to 360. On 14 August 1998 Wyvern House moved onto its new campus. Sixty years after its foundation, the complex, designed by Old Newingtonian architect John Lawes, was opened by the Governor of New South Wales, Gordon Samuels.

In January 2009, the Council of Newington College purchased the campus of Mary Andrews College adjacent to Wyvern House at 143–145 Trafalgar Street and 129–133 Cambridge Street. The new site contains two Victorian style homes, Braeside and Horaceville (1884) and a coach house. From 1946 until 1992 the site was the Braeside Church of England Hospital owned by the Anglican Deaconess Institution, Sydney. From 1997, the site became an additional campus of Mary Andrews College and provided residential accommodation. The property was leased back to its previous owner for the first twelve months until plans were formulated for its redevelopment. This 5000 square metre property greatly expanded the current Wyvern campus.

== Masters of Wyvern ==
The head of Wyvern House was initially known as Housemaster and then as Master-in-charge and currently as Master.

| Ordinal | Officeholder | | | Term start | Term end | Time in office | Notes |
| Ordinal | Master | Education | Previous positions held | Term start | Term end | Time in office | Notes |
|---|---|---|---|---|---|---|---|
| 1 | Harold Prince | Master of Arts, University of Oxford | New College Choir School | 1939 | 1941 | 1–2 years | |
| 2 | George Vaughan MC | | Ashfield Preparatory School | 1941 | 1946 | 4–5 years | |
| 3 | Bill Tongue | | | 1947 | 1965 | 17–18 years | |
| 4 | Roy Zimmerman OAM | | Head, The Scots College, Warwick | 1966 | 1996 | 29–30 years | |
| 5 | Ruskin Donlan | Newington College (1961–1969) | Principal, Homebush Public School | 1996 | 2000 | 3–4 years | |
| 6 | Peter Franks | | Trinity Grammar School Preparatory School | 2001 | 2007 | 5–6 years | |
| 7 | Andrew Coote | | Ravenswood School for Girls | 2009 | 2009 | 0 years | |
| 8 | Ian Holden | | | 2009 | 2022 | 12–13 years | |

== Campus ==
Wyvern House was largely designed and built as a primary school but incorporates Dey House, built in 1954, and the Stanmore Deaf Centre, 1975, which had both been developed by the Adult Deaf Society of NSW, and an adjoining substantial villa, "Pendawar", of the Victorian era. The purpose-built classrooms all have adjoining withdrawal rooms that allow for separate work to be undertaken and for individual tutoring. Specialist facilities include a library and art and music rooms. As well as open playgrounds and two basketball/tennis courts, Wyvern has a spacious under-cover rooftop area for physical education and wet weather play. The entire school can meet in the assembly hall and the boys are serviced at lunch and recess by an adjacent tuck-shop. Arrival at, and departure from, the school is facilitated by a drive-through entrance underneath the main building giving all-weather safe access for young students. Swimming, athletics, Rugby and soccer are held on the Newington main campus reached via a footbridge over Stanmore Road.

== Houses ==
In the first year of Wyvern House the school was divided into three groups like houses: Bears, Tigers and Wolves. In 1946 three houses were formed with names honouring early Newington Headmasters: Coates (Joseph Coates, Headmaster 1877–1883), Williams (William Williams, Headmaster 1884–1892) and Lucas (Arthur Lucas, Headmaster 1893–1898). An additional house was added later: Howe (Dr Michael Howe, Headmaster 1869–1877). In 1986, the houses of Epworth and Geneva were added to bring the total to six but these have since been disbanded and there are now only four houses again.

== Notable alumni ==
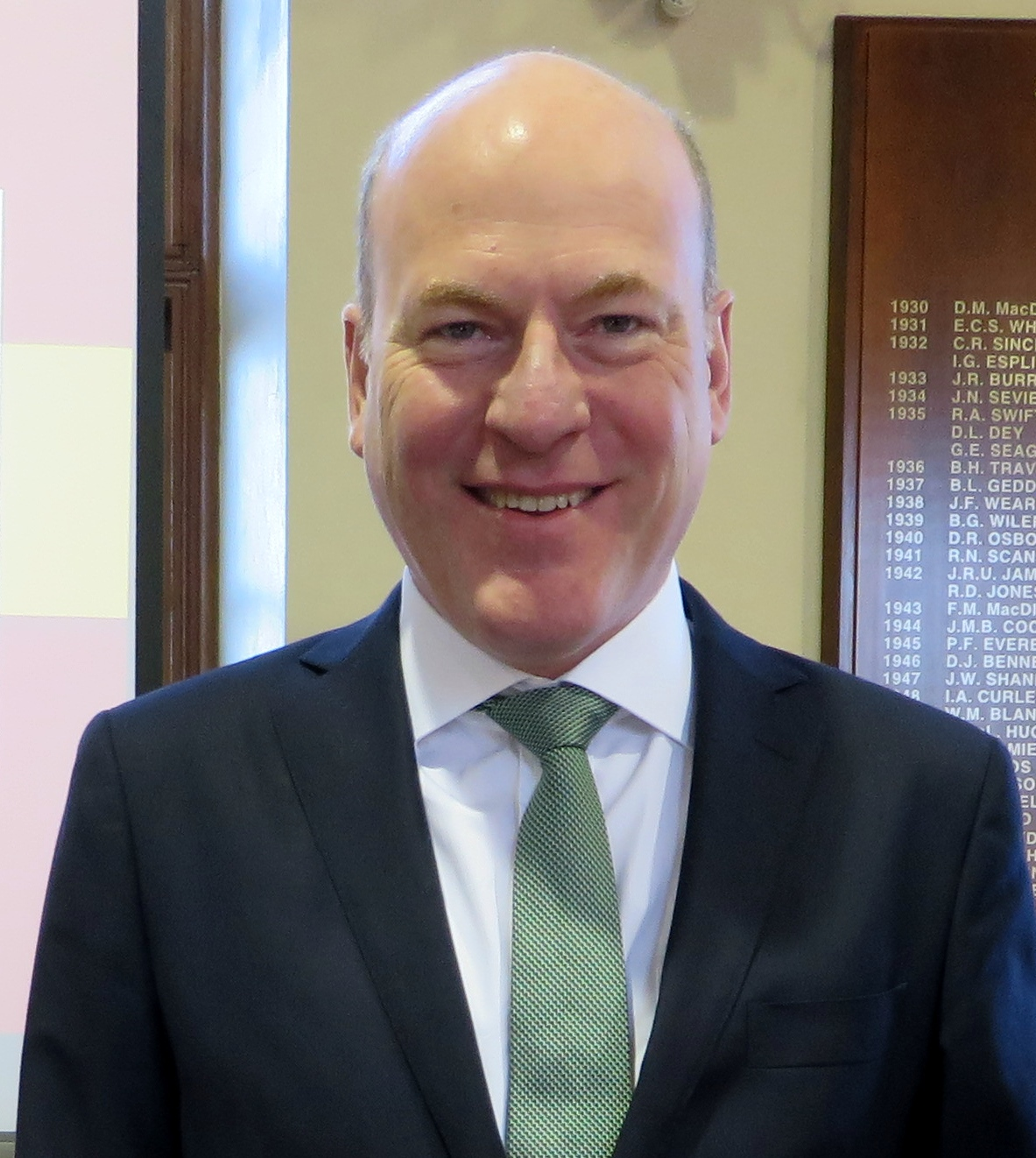
Federal Member North Sydney Trent Zimmerman MP

The following Old Newingtonians commenced at Wyvern House. Enrolment years at Newington, as published in the Register of Past Students 1863–1998, are bracketed following the surname.

=== Parliament ===
- Neville Perkins OAM (1963–1969) – Former Head NSW Department of Aboriginal Affairs and Northern Territory MLA
- Sonatane Tu'a Taumoepeau Tupou (1953–1962) – Tongan Foreign Affairs Minister and former Ambassador to the United Nations, USA and High Commissioner to Canada
- Robert Webster (1963–1969) – Former NSW Planning Minister and Sydney Partner Korn/Ferry International
- Trent Zimmerman (1974–1986) – Member of the House of Representatives seat of North Sydney since a 2015 by-election. Zimmerman is the first openly LGBTI member of the House of Representatives

=== Cultural and scientific organisations ===
- Dr Warwick Cathro (1957–1964) – former Assistant Director-General National Library of Australia who was pivotal in the development of Trove
- Frank Howarth (1963–1969) – former director Australian Museum and Royal Botanic Gardens, Sydney
- Ian Stephenson (1965–1972) – Curator University of New England and former director Canberra Museum and Gallery and Historic Places ACT

=== Armed services ===
- Rear Admiral Gerry Carwardine AO (1947–1953) – former Commandant Australian Defence Force Academy

=== Law ===
- Prof Bob Baxt AO (1947–1955) – Former Dean of Law Monash University and former Chairman Trade Practices Commission
- Prof Christoper Roper AM (1955–1961) – Adjunct Professor City University of Hong Kong, Former Director College of Law Sydney and Former Professor College of Law England and Wales

=== Sciences ===
- Prof Reuben Rose (1958–1966) – former Dean of Veterinary Science University of Sydney
- Emeritus Prof John Turtle AO (1947–1953) – former Kellion Professor of Endocrinology University of Sydney; co-founder Australian Diabetes Society and former President International Diabetes Federation

=== Business ===
- Ian Diery (1958–1967) – former Vice-President Apple, and director of The Timberland Company
- Owen Howell-Price (1938–1944) – director and former Chairman Dairy Farm South Asia and CEO Woolworths
- Bill Ireland (1961–1968) – Chairman Mariner Wealth Management Ltd and former CEO Challenger International
- Robert Millner (1959–1968) – Chairman of six ASX-listed companies, Washington H Soul Pattinson, Brickworks, Choiseul Investments, Milton Corporation, New Hope Coal and Soul Telecommunications
- Neil Perry (1968–1973) – chef and restaurateur Rockpool, author and TV presenter LifeStyle Food

=== Arts, media and entertainment ===
- Tobias Cole (1976–1988) – countertenor for Opera Australia
- Matt Holmes (1981–1993) – actor Blue Heelers and Sea Patrol
- Peter Holder (1974–1982) – publisher
- Warwick Moss (1958–1965) – actor, television personality and New South Wales Premier's Literary Award winning writer
- Stephen Rae (1972–1979) – AFI Award winning film and TV musician and composer
- Gary Shearston (1950–1955) – Australia's best selling folk singer
- Colin Still (1950–1960) – Sir John Sulman Medal winning architect
- Jeremy Lindsay Taylor (1983–1991) – actor in Heartbreak High, Something in the Air and Sea Patrol

=== Sport ===
- David Forbes (1943–49) – Olympic Games Gold Medallist Sailing
- Peter Jorgensen (1980–1986) – former Wallaby
- Judge Fred Kirkham (1945–1953) – Olympic Games Bronze Medallist Rowing
- Stuart MacDougall (1955–1965) – former Wallaby
- Michael Morgan OAM (1957–1964) – Olympic Games Silver Medallist Rowing
- Roy Prosser (1949–1959) – former Wallaby
- Geoff Stewart (1984–1991) – dual Olympic Games Bronze Medallist Rowing
- James Stewart (1984–1991) – dual Olympic Games Bronze Medallist Rowing
- Stephen Stewart (1985–1995) – Olympic Games Bronze Medallist Rowing
- Richard Wearne (1981–1989) – Bronze medal in 1994 pair oar and silver medal in 1995 pair oar World Rowing Championships

== See also ==
- List of non-government schools in New South Wales
- Newington College
