= Jim Millner =

Australian businessman (1919–2007)

Jim Millner AM
- Born: James Sinclair Millner; 29 November 1919; Sydney, New South Wales
- Died: 24 January 2007 (aged 87); Cheltenham, New South Wales
- Education: Newington College
- Alma mater: University of Sydney
- Occupation: Company director
- Spouse: Jean Millner
- Parents: Col. T. G. Millner (father); Mary (May) Pattinson (mother)
- Family: Lewy Pattinson (grandfather); Robert Millner (nephew); William Frederick Pattinson (uncle)

James Sinclair Millner AM (29 November 1919 – 24 January 2007) was an Australian corporate executive. He was head of many large organisations including chairman of the NRMA, Soul Patts, New Hope Group, Brickworks, Choiseul Investments, Queensland Mines Limited and NBN Television.

== Biography ==
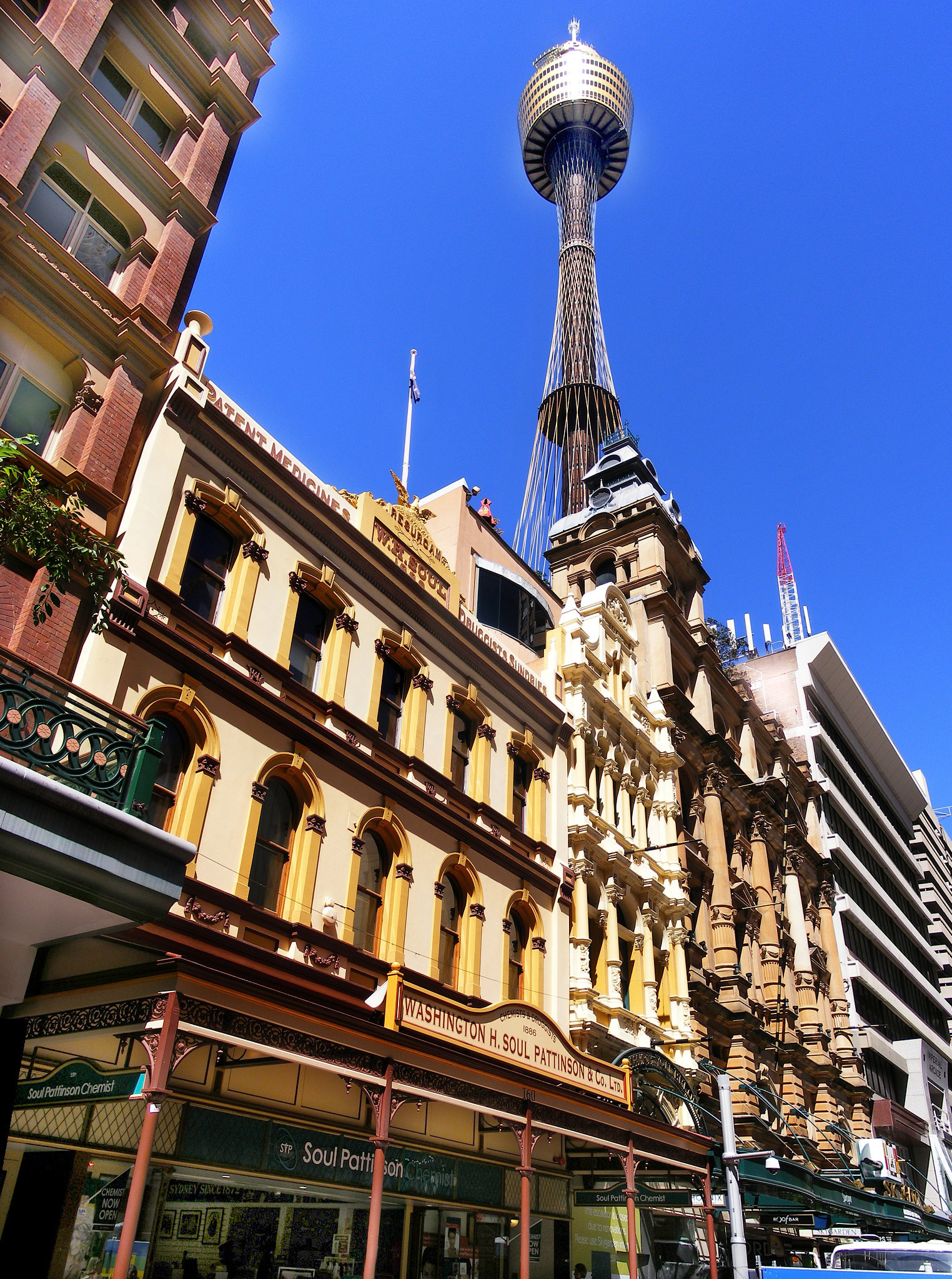
Soul Patts in Pitt Street Mall, Sydney

Millner was born in Sydney on 29 November 1919. His father Thomas George Millner MC, VD was a colonel in the Australian Army and his mother Mary was the daughter of businessman Lewy Pattinson. Millner grew up in Cheltenham, New South Wales, and attended Newington College before studying pharmacy at The University of Sydney. At the breakout of World War II Millner enlisted in the Army Service Corps Officer Training School and was posted to Malaya. When Singapore fell, he became a prisoner of war in Changi Prison Singapore, then later Sandakan, Borneo. He was released at the cessation of hostilities in 1945, shipping out to Morotai and then Balikpapan. Jim Millner married Jean Claveranne in 1948. On his return, Millner completed a Materia Medica (Pharmacy) course in 1947 at the University of Sydney, and joined the family company, Soul Patts, where he rose to be director in 1957. Millner was chairman of Soul Patts from 1969 to 1998, when he was succeeded by his nephew, Robert Millner.

== Philanthropy and community ==
Millner supported financially the Australian War Memorial, the Royal Botanic Garden, Sydney and served on the council of Newington College. His widow, Jean Millner, endowed the Jim Millner Bursary at Newington giving a boy the opportunity to attend the College from Year 7 until the completion of Year 12. In the 1983 Queen's Birthday Honours, Millner was made a Member of the Order of Australia (AM) for "Service to industry and the community".

Business positions
Preceded by William Frederick Pattinson	Chairman of Soul Patts; 1969 – 1998	Succeeded by Robert Millner
