= George Le Couteur =

Australian wool broker, economist and company director

George Le Couteur OBE
- Born: 14 September 1915; Perth, Western Australia
- Died: 31 August 1978; Sydney
- Education: Newington College; University of Sydney
- Occupation: Company director
- Spouse(s): Nancy, née Oates (1939)
- Children: One daughter, two sons
- Parent(s): Emma and Philip Le Couteur

George Sugden Le Couteur (14 September 1915 – 31 August 1978) was an Australian wool broker, economist and company director. He was President of the Committee for Economic Development of Australia from 1968 to 1974.

== Family ==
Le Couteur was born in Perth. He was the son of Philip Le Couteur, an academic, philosopher and headmaster, and Emma, the musically gifted daughter of the Rev Edward Sugden. Both his parents were Methodist and Australian born. He had two sisters and two brothers.

== Education ==
Le Couteur's father was appointed headmaster of Methodist Ladies' College, Melbourne, and he commenced his education at the neighbouring Trinity Grammar School. Philip Le Couteur became headmaster of Hale School and in 1929 George returned to the city of his birth and was a student in his father's school until 1930. In 1931 his father succeeded the Rev Dr Charles Prescott as headmaster of Newington College. Whilst at Newington (1931–1934) Le Couteur excelled in athletics and was captain of the team in 1932, 1933 and 1934 and was captain of the 1st XI cricket in 1934. In his last year of school he won a Wigram Allen Scholarship, from the bequest of Sir George Wigram Allen, and was Senior Prefect. After completing the Leaving Certificate, Le Couteur went up to the University of Sydney in 1935 and he graduated as a Bachelor of Arts in 1938. Whilst at university he received a Blue for cricket.

== War years ==
Upon graduation, Le Couteur went to England and taught at Marlborough College, Wiltshire and then returned home to enlist. In 1939 he married Jean Oates, youngest daughter of Mr and Mrs T T Oates of Orange. The president of the Methodist Conference, the Rev E E Hynes, officiated at the ceremony in the Newington College Chapel. Le Couteur served with the Second Australian Imperial Force in World War II from 1940 until 1944 rising to the rank of major. At war's end he returned to study and completed a Master of Arts in 1946.

== Business career ==
Le Couteur worked for the Australian Mercantile Land & Finance Company from 1949 until 1969, becoming general manager in 1964 and a Director in 1966. In 1959–60 he served as President of the Melbourne Woolbrokers' Association and he was later a director of the Commercial Union Assurance Company of Australia Ltd. He served as President of the Commercial Law Association of Australia from 1966 until 1968 and again from 1970 until 1972.

== Community service ==
For three years from 1947, Le Couteur was a Fellow of Senate of the University of Sydney as a graduate representing undergraduates. He was a member of the Advisory Board of The Melbourne Institute of Applied Economic and Social Research from 1961 until 1972. From 1966 until 1973, he was the Chairman of the Advisory Board of the Civilian Maimed and Limbless Association. He was also a member of the Council of the NSW Division of the National Heart Foundation of Australia.

== Publications ==
- Marketing of the Australian wool clip : a case for free enterprise (1967)
- Wool! Modern myths, new horizons (1967)
- Colonial investment adventure 1824–1855 (1978)

== Honours ==
In 1972, Le Couteur was made an Officer of the Order of the British Empire (Civil) for services to finance and the community.
