= Cathro =

Cathro may refer to

- an unincorporated community in Maple Ridge Township, Alpena County, Michigan, U.S.
- Ian Cathro (born 1986), Scottish football coach
- Warwick Cathro (born 1948), Australian librarian
