= Thomas Hughes (Sydney mayor) =

Australian politician (1863–1930)

The Honourable Sir Thomas Hughes KCSG JP

42nd Mayor of Sydney
- In office 1 January 1902 – 31 December 1902
- Preceded by: Sir James Graham
- Succeeded by: office abolished

1st Lord Mayor of Sydney
- In office 1 January 1903 – 31 December 1903
- Preceded by: Himself
- Succeeded by: Samuel Edward Lees
- In office 1 January 1907 – 31 December 1908
- Preceded by: Allen Taylor
- Succeeded by: Sir Allen Taylor

Alderman of the Sydney City Council
- In office 5 September 1898 – 1 December 1912

Member of the Legislative Council of New South Wales
- In office 21 July 1908 – 15 April 1930
- Appointed by: Sir Harry Rawson

Personal details
- Born: 19 April 1863 Sydney, Colony of New South Wales
- Died: 15 April 1930 (aged 66) Elizabeth Bay, New South Wales, Australia
- Spouse(s): Louisa Gilhooley (m. 1887–1948)
- Children: Geoffrey Forrest Hughes; Roger Forrest Hughes
- Relatives: John Francis Hughes (brother); Robert Hughes (grandson); Tom Hughes (grandson); Lucy Turnbull (great-granddaughter)
- Occupation: Solicitor and businessman

Sir Thomas Hughes KCSG, JP (19 April 1863 – 15 April 1930) was an Australian businessman and New South Wales state politician who was Lord Mayor of Sydney, a member of the New South Wales Legislative Council and served as Chairman of Washington H Soul Pattinson from 1906 to 1929.

== Early years and background ==
Thomas Hughes was born in Sydney, Colony of New South Wales, on 19 April 1863, the third son of wealthy Irish immigrants, John Hughes, of Kincoppal, and Susan Sharkey. His elder brother was future Sydney Alderman and NSW politician, John Francis. Hughes, along with his brother, was sent to England to be educated as Stonyhurst College in Lancashire, and he matriculated for the University of London in 1880.

After undertaking a tour of Europe, Hughes then returned to Sydney and in 1882 entered the legal profession, being articled to Thomas Slattery and was admitted as a solicitor on 28 May 1887. Thereafter he entered practice with his brother. On 19 October 1887, he married Louisa Gilhooley, the daughter of physician James Gilhooley. They had two sons: Geoffrey Forrest Hughes, who became a solicitor and was a flying ace of World War I, and Roger Forrest Hughes, who became a doctor, signed up in March 1916 to the Army Medical Corps and was killed in action during the Battle of the Somme on 11 December 1916.

== Political and business career ==
Hughes entered public life in New South Wales when he openly supported Australian Federation in 1898 and became secretary to his brother John who was at the time serving as Representative of Government in Legislative Council for George Reid's Free Trade Party. In January 1899 he accompanied Reid, as his secretary, to the Federal Conference of Premiers in Melbourne which involved placing the colony's interests in the draft constitution. When Reid resigned his seat to stand for the newly formed Federal Parliament, Hughes stood as the Liberal Reform Party candidate (The Liberals had been formed out of the old Free Trade Party and were affiliated with Reid's federal Free Traders) for Reid's state seat of Sydney-King but was defeated by the Progressive Party candidate Ernest Broughton by a margin of eighteen votes.

Hughes instead found success in his role as Alderman on Sydney City Council for Bourke Ward, which he had been elected to on 5 September 1898. An advocate of municipal reform, Hughes instituted an investigation into the city's finances, which would eventually result in the formation of the Civic Reform Association in 1920. With James Graham, he helped to organise the Citizens' Vigilante Committee which assisted in controlling the first plague outbreak in 1900. Hughes was elected as the last Mayor in January 1902, and was the first Lord Mayor of Sydney with the issuing of the Letters Patent from Edward VII granting the title to the city. Hughes also became a supporter for the concept of a unified 'Greater Sydney', with a single municipal body owning and controlling key public services in the Sydney basin. He was re-elected for another two terms as Lord Mayor from 1907 to 1908.

In July 1908, Hughes was given a life appointment to the New South Wales Legislative Council. Taylor supported successive conservative parties in NSW, sitting in the Council for the Liberal Reform and Nationalist parties respectively during his time on the council. From 1908 to 1909 he chaired the Royal Commission for the improvement of the city of Sydney and its suburbs. Hughes would serve on Sydney City Council until he resigned on 1 December 1912.

Hughes became highly proficient in business circles and was appointed Chairman of directors of AWA, Tooheys and Washington H Soul Pattinson (1906–1929). He also served as a director of Commercial Banking Company of Sydney (1915-1919, 1920-1928), and the Australia Hotel Company. A firm catholic and prominent member of the Sydney Catholic community, Hughes served as secretary to the first and third Sydney Catholic Congresses in 1900 and 1909. He was awarded the rank of Knight Commander of the Order of St. Gregory the Great (KCSG) by Pope Benedict XV in 1915. He was appointed as a Knight Bachelor in George V's 1915 Birthday Honours.

During the World War I, Hughes and his wife were a foundation executive-members of the Universal Service League and were part of a small group of upper-class Catholics who opposed the anti-conscription stance of the Catholic Archbishop of Melbourne Daniel Mannix and other Catholics. Although he remained a firm opponent of the influence of sectarianism and its position in society at that time.

== Later life and legacy ==
In his later years, Hughes was a member of the Australian Club and of the council of The Women's College, University of Sydney. Suffering from chronic nephritis and arteriosclerosis, he died on 15 April 1930 in St Vincent's Hospital, Sydney and was buried in Waverley Cemetery after a service at St Canice's Church, Darlinghurst. On his death, the Premier Thomas Bavin noted: "The name of Sir Thomas Hughes has for many years been prominently associated with the public life of New South Wales, and both the Commonwealth, and the State will be the poorer because of his death. He will be particularly missed in the Legislative Council, where his counsels and mature judgment on problems of the day were of the greatest value. Sir Thomas rendered equally distinguished service to the State in the municipal and commercial spheres of activity. He held the distinction of being the first Lord Mayor of Sydney, and during his year of office following his elevation to that position, as well as during the three subsequent occasions on which he held that responsible post, he conducted the affairs of the City Council with outstanding dignity and ability." Hughes Street in Potts Point is named after him.

Civic offices
Preceded by Sir James Graham	Mayor of Sydney; 1902	Succeeded by Himself as Lord Mayor of Sydney
Preceded by Himself as Mayor of Sydney	Lord Mayor of Sydney; 1903	Succeeded by Samuel Lees
Preceded by Allen Taylor	Lord Mayor of Sydney; 1906 – 1908	Succeeded by Sir Allen Taylor
Business positions
Preceded by Lewy Pattinson	Chairman of Washington H Soul Pattinson; 1906 – 1929	Succeeded by William Frederick Pattinson
