= Speare's Brickworks =

Australian brick manufacturer

- Formerly: Goodsell's Brickworks (1869–1891); Newtown Steam Brickworks
- Type: Private
- Industry: Brick
- Founded: 1869; 157 years ago
- Defunct: 1970s
- Fate: Sold to Brickworks Ltd. in the 1950s, St. Peters site later became Camdenville Park
- Headquarters: St Peters, Sydney, Australia
- Area served: Sydney metropolitan area
- Key people: Peter Speare (proprietor, 1891–1897); Sarah Speare (manager, 1897–1912); Ernest Loftus Speare (director, 1912–1950s)
- Products: Bricks, tiles, clay pipes

Speare's Brickworks was an Australian brick manufacturer based in St Peters, New South Wales.

Established in 1869 as Goodsell's Brickworks in Newtown, the facility was Sydney's first fully steam-powered brick factory. It pioneered the use of Shale clay and mechanized processes, achieving a daily output of up to 15,000 bricks.

In 1891, the plant was acquired by Peter Speare during an economic downturn and became Speare's Brickworks. It continued operations through the 1890s, supplying bricks for Sydney's urban expansion. The site of the former brickworks is a notable landmark in the St Peters area of Sydney.

== History ==
Speare's Brickworks was originally founded in 1869 as Goodsell’s Brickworks, the first fully steam-powered brick factory in Sydney. Goodsell pioneered the use of shale clay and mechanized processes, achieving outputs up to 15,000 bricks per day, far higher than traditional hand-molded yards.

In 1891, Peter Speare acquired the Goodsell brickmaking plant, then known as the Newtown Steam Brickworks, during an economic downturn. Under Peter Speare’s ownership, the brickworks continued production through the 1890s. However, Peter Speare’s tenure was short-lived; he died in June 1897. After his death, his widow Sarah Speare took over management of the business. Sarah Speare kept the company running and even secured government supply contracts in the early 1900s, providing the brickworks’ products (clay bricks and pipes) for public infrastructure projects such as stormwater drains and the Royal Prince Alfred Hospital in Sydney.

In 1912, Ernest Loftus Speare, Peter’s son, opened Speare’s Brick and Pipe Works in Tempe to access new clay resources. By this time, the original clay pit at St Peters was becoming exhausted; Speare’s had already resorted to sourcing shale clay from a quarry in Kingsgrove to keep St Peters production going. World War I and resource depletion led to a scaling back of the St Peters site. Speare’s Brickworks at St Peters ceased its brickmaking operations around 1916. The former Speare’s Brickworks site was reclaimed and converted into a public park (Camdenville Park) by 1957.

Despite the end of brickmaking at St Peters, the Speare’s Brick and Pipe Works in Tempe continued operating for several more decades. The Tempe yard finally closed in the 1970s when it was sold to Penfolds winemakers.

== Operations ==
Speare's Brickworks was known for its mechanized and large-scale operations, inherited from the site’s original owners. The St Peters brickworks was equipped with steam-powered machinery that drove clay crushers, pug mills, and brick presses. It enabled mass-production of “shale plastic” bricks, bricks made from the tough clay shale distinctive to the St Peters area. The use of steam power and modern kilns distinguished Speare’s from many smaller brickyards of the 19th century, which relied on manual labor. By employing industrial techniques, Speare’s could produce tens of thousands of bricks per day to meet Sydney’s construction demand.

The brickworks site in St Peters included deep open clay pits, a processing plant, and tall chimneys for its coal-fired kilns. As the local clay was depleted, the company brought in raw material from elsewhere; for example, shale was hauled from Speare’s own quarry at Kingsgrove to feed the St Peter's brickmaking plant. The business expanded its product line over time, which required building additional facilities such as pipe kilns and drying sheds. In the 1930s, it was formally incorporated as Speare’s Tempe Brick, Tile and Pipe Works Ltd. The main manufacturing base shifted to the new Tempe site on Princes Highway, although it was still commonly associated with St Peters.

It was sold in the 1950s to Brickworks Ltd.
