= WHSP =

WHSP may refer to:

- WHSP-LP, a low-power radio station (100.9 FM) licensed to serve Black Mountain, North Carolina, United States
- WUVP-DT, a television station (channel 29, virtual 65) licensed to serve Vineland, New Jersey, United States, which held the call sign WHSP or WHSP-TV from 1986 to 2001
- Soul Patts, formerly Washington H Soul Pattinson, Australian company
