= John Turtle =

Australian medical academic (1937–2024)

John Turtle AO OF
- Born: John Ross Turtle; 13 January 1937; Sydney, NSW, Australia
- Died: 3 October 2024 (aged 86); Sydney, NSW, Australia
- Education: Wyvern House; Newington College; University of Sydney; University of Alberta
- Occupation: Endocrinologist
- Spouse: Jenefer
- Children: 2

John Ross Turtle AO OF (13 January 1937 – 31 March 2024) was an Australian medical academic and endocrinologist.

In 1992, he was appointed Officer in the Order of Australia. Subsequently, he was appointed Officer in the Order of Fiji in recognition of work in the field of diabetes internationally.

Turtle was elected as the Honorary President of the International Diabetes Federation, Honorary Life Member of the Australian Diabetes Society and the Endocrine Society of Australia. He was appointed Emeritus Professor of the University of Sydney in 2002.

== Life ==
Turtle was born in Sydney, Australia, and attended Newington College (1947–1953), commencing as a preparatory school student in Wyvern House.

Turtle received his PhD in experimental social psychology from the University of Alberta, completed a Social Sciences and Humanities Research Council of Canada (SSHRC) postdoctoral fellowship at the University of British Columbia, and then worked for four years as an assistant professor at York University before coming to Ryerson in 1994.

== Medical career ==
- Head, Royal Prince Alfred Hospital Endocrinology Department (1971–2002)
- Professor of Medicine, University of Sydney (1971–2002)
- Emeritus Professor (2003–2024)

== Committees ==
- Vice-President, International Diabetes Federation (1991–1997)
- Member, Australian Drug Evaluation Committee (1972–1993)

== Fellowships and honours ==
- Fellow, Royal College of Physicians
- Fellow, Royal Australasian College of Physicians
- Officer, Order of Australia (1992)
- Officer, Order of Fiji (1999)

== Publications ==
- A Normal Life with Diabetes – jointly (1972)
- The Diabetic Gourmet – jointly (1975)
- Life with Diabetes – jointly (1982)
- Diabetes in the New Millennium – jointly (1999)
