= Reuben Rose =

Australian veterinary educator

Emeritus Professor Reuben Johnston Rose (born 21 October 1949) is an Australian veterinary educator and a former Dean of the Faculty of Veterinary Science at the University of Sydney.

== Early life ==
Rose was raised on a sheep grazing operation near Jindabyne, New South Wales. He was educated at Newington College (1958–1966), commencing as a preparatory school student at Wyvern House. He graduated from the University of Sydney Veterinary School in 1972. After completing a postgraduate diploma in veterinary anaesthesia Rose worked in equine and mixed veterinary practice in New Zealand.

== University career ==
He returned to the University of Sydney in 1975 to run the equine clinic and completed research into fluids and electrolytes for his Doctor of Philosophy degree in 1980. He has spent periods as a visiting scientist at the Animal Health Trust, Newmarket United Kingdom and as a visiting professor at Washington State University College of Veterinary Medicine and the University of Florida College of Veterinary Medicine.

== Publications ==
Rose is the co-author of two textbooks along with David Hodgson, Manual of Equine Practice (1993 and revised in 2000) and The Athletic Horse (1994), as well as a large number of scientific papers.

== Research ==
Rose has undertaken a wide range of research projects over the past 20 years, commencing with pioneering work into physiological changes in endurance and eventing horses, research on newborn foal physiology and diseases, development of new drug treatments, research into antibiotics and studies of the effects of training, fluids and electrolytes, nutrition and drugs on performance.

== Post academic career ==
He was the General Manager, Livestock Production Innovation, at the Meat and Livestock Australia until November 2006 and is now a part of the International Veterinary Accreditation Association, as well as chairing the group TEC-1 for The Executive Connection.

== Interests ==
Rose plays piano, guitar, bass guitar, drums, and piano accordion. He composed two musicals for St. Barnabas, Broadway, the most recognised being Joe of Oz, a comedic version of the Book of Job.
