= Philip Le Couteur =

Australian academic, philosopher and headmaster

- Born: 26 June 1885; Kyneton, Victoria
- Died: 30 June 1958 (aged 73); Gunnedah, New South Wales
- Education: Warrnambool Academy; Queen's College, University of Melbourne; University College, Oxford.
- Occupation: Headmaster
- Spouse(s): Emma, the daughter of Rev Edward Sugden.
- Children: Two daughters and three sons including George Le Couteur OBE
- Parent(s): Fanny and George Le Couteur

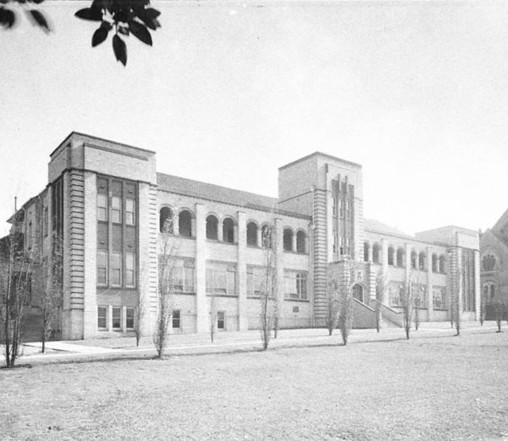
Wyvern House was opened during Le Couteur's Headmastership

Philip Ridgway "Pip" Le Couteur (26 June 1885 – 30 June 1958) was an Australian academic, philosopher and headmaster.

== Early life ==
Le Couteur was born at Kyneton, Victoria, the only son of George, a pharmaceutical chemist, and his wife Fanny. Both parents were Methodist and Australian born. He was educated at Middle Park State School and Warrnambool Academy before serving a pharmacy apprenticeship.

== Academic career ==
In 1903 he entered the University of Melbourne to study arts and in 1904 he won a Queen's College residential scholarship. He graduated with a Bachelor of Arts in 1906 and was a triple blue in cricket, football and lawn tennis. After beginning a medical degree in 1907 Le Couteur won the Victorian Rhodes Scholarship for 1908 and, with a Melbourne Master of Arts, proceeded to University College, Oxford. He won an Oxford cricket blue and in 1911 a place in Wisden for making 160 runs and taking 11 wickets for 69 against Cambridge. He played regularly for Gentlemen versus Players and wrote magazines on the psychology of cricket. He was also a member of the Oxford String Quartette. Le Couteur then studied experimental psychology at the University of Bonn, Germany until early 1913 when he was appointed lecturer in mental and moral philosophy in the newly established University of Western Australia. In that year he married Emma, the musically gifted daughter of Edward Sugden.

== Headmaster ==
In 1918 Le Couteur was appointed headmaster of Methodist Ladies' College, Melbourne. The position proved difficult, as control of the school was shared with the foundation president, who was a bulwark against reform. For ten years Le Couteur served on various university committees and school councils and captained the Hawthorn-East Melbourne Cricket Club. Unsuccessful in applications for the headship of Sydney Grammar School in 1921 and the mastership of Queen's in 1927, he became headmaster of Hale School in 1929. In 1931 he was appointed headmaster of Newington College succeeding the Rev Dr Charles Prescott. Le Couteur's term at Newington covered the difficult Depression and war years, yet saw a remarkable increase in pupils and the opening of a preparatory school, Wyvern House, in 1938. With his wife Le Couteur developed the school's musical life. On retirement in 1948 he maintained an interest in the Fairbridge Farm School movement. He died in Gunnedah, New South Wales, and was survived by his wife, two daughters and three sons.

== See also ==
- List of Victoria first-class cricketers

Preceded by Rev Dr Charles Prescott	Headmaster; Newington College; 1931–1948	Succeeded by Mervyn Austin
