= Ian Stephenson (curator) =

Australian curator (1955–2024)

- Born: Ian Malcolm Stephenson; 1 December 1955; Sydney, New South Wales, Australia
- Died: 24 October 2024 (aged 68); Glebe, New South Wales, Australia
- Education: Newington College; Scots All Saints' College; University of Tasmania; University of Sydney
- Occupation: Curator
- Website: Ian Malcom Stephenson 1955—2024

Ian Malcolm Stephenson (1 December 1955 – 24 October 2024) was an Australian curator who was president of The Glebe Society in Sydney. He was on the board of the National Trust of Australia (NSW) from 2010 until 2022 and was chair of the properties committee from 2014 until 2022. Stephenson was a trustee of the Copland Foundation and an area of special interest and knowledge was Anglo Indian architecture. An obituary in the Sydney Morning Herald (SMH) said “From his earliest years he had a fascination for the world around him – not just for what was there but why it was there and the story behind it. In his long career in conservation … he fulfilled his vision of preserving our cultural treasures.” In a letter to the editor of the SMH the architectural historian, author and biographer Zeny Edwards OAM wrote “his indefatigable devotion to architectural heritage … was the column that ensured that the architectural and cultural heritage of Australia will continue to be supported” for many years.

== Early life ==
Stephenson was born in Sydney and attended Newington College (1965–1972) as a day student commencing in the preparatory school Wyvern House. In 1973 he became a boarding student at Scots All Saints' College completing his HSC in 1974. He then studied at the University of Tasmania and the University of Sydney.

== Curatorial career ==
In 1988 Stephenson became the inaugural curator of the colonial Georgian-era house museum Collingwood and the adjoining Bicentennial Museum at Liverpool. From 1990 he worked at the National Trust of Australia (NSW) and spent seven years as the senior curator. In 2001 he was appointed the Director of Historic Places, ACT, in Canberra and from 2006 was the CEO of the National Trust in South Australia. From 2009 until 2020 he was the curator of collections at the University of New England. In 2018 Stephenson curated a major exhibition at Old Government House, Parramatta, entitled "From Bombay to Parramatta, discover the rich history between India and NSW, from the time of Governor Macquarie to today’s vibrant cultural life of Western Sydney and beyond".

== Death ==
Following travel to South America and several several days without communication, Stephenson was found dead in his home in Glebe on 24 October 2024. A Requiem Mass was held on 21 November 2024 at Christ Church St Laurence, Sydney. In lieu of flowers mourners were asked to make donations to the Christ Church St Laurence restoration appeal or the National Trust of Australia.
