= G. K. Cowlishaw =

Australian politician (1901–1983)

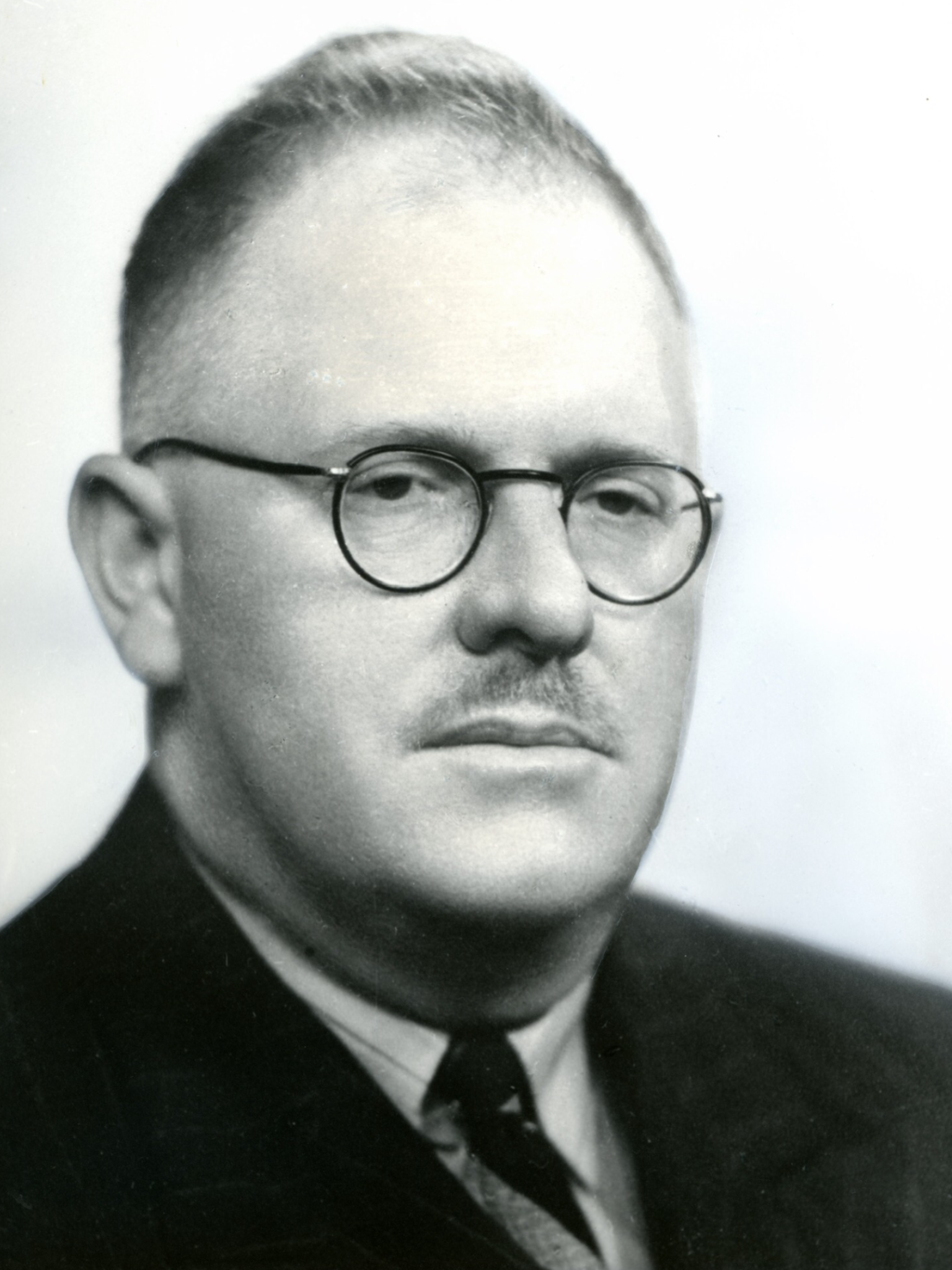

Mayor of Mosman
- In office 1940–1945
- Preceded by: Frank Pursell OBE
- Succeeded by: Pat Morton

Personal details
- Born: George Keith Cowlishaw; 18 November 1901 Mosman, New South Wales, Australia
- Died: 2 October 1982 (aged 80) St Ives, New South Wales, Australia
- Spouse: Eileen (Bon) (née Smith) 1905-1997
- Children: Four daughters
- Education: Newington College; Solicitors’ Admission Board
- Occupation: Law clerk

George Keith Cowlishaw (18 November 1901 – 2 October 1983) was an Australian collector, garden writer and philanthropist who twice served as Mayor of Mosman in the 1940s.

== Early years ==
Cowlishaw was born into a socially prominent Queensland rural family. He was the first child, and only son, of George Owen Cowlishaw (1875–1954) a director of the Australian Land and Agency Company of Sydney. His father held extensive rural properties in the Darling Downs and was born in Brisbane. His mother, born Eliza Sarah Rabone (1871–1931), was born in Tonga and was the daughter of the Rev William Thomas Rabone and granddaughter of the Rev Stephen Rabone both Wesleyan Methodist ministers in Australia and the Pacific Islands. His younger sister was Eleanor Madge Cowlishaw (1905–1931). His preferred Christian name was Keith to differentiate him from his father.

== Telopea ==
The Rabone family, and then the Cowlishaw family, lived at Telopea 612 Military Road Mosman from the 1890s. The house is now at 89B Cowles Road, Mosman, and was an almost identical twin of Baronia House Mosman. For many years the building was known as The White House but is now The Albert, a boutique hotel.

== Education ==
Cowlishaw attended Newington College in Sydney from 1913 until 1920. His family had many historical connections to the school. In 1866 his maternal grandfather, the Rev Stephen Rabone, had been Chairman of the Newington College Council when it was first established. His father had been a boarding student in the 1890s as he was then from Brisbane. As an Old Newingtonian his father was for many years on the Newington College Council. The main drive of the school has, since the 1940s, been named Cowlishaw Drive in his father's honour. Cowlishaw passed the Intermediate Certificate at Newington in 1918 but didn't sit for the Leaving Certificate as a school boy. He matriculated in arts some years after leaving Newington. In 1925 he enrolled as an evening student in the Faculty of Arts at the University of Sydney. That year he studied English I, History I and Philosophy I. In 1926 he studied Economics I but didn't sit any exams in either year.

== Legal clerk ==
After the payment of £2,000 on 27 November 1925 by George Cowlishaw Snr to the solicitor John Joseph McDonald, Cowlishaw was taken on as a legal clerk for five years working for the law firm of A.B. Shaw and McDonald in Pitt Street, Sydney. The firm had been founded in 1908 but this century merged with Chamberlains Solicitors. He was paid in the first and second years £1 per week, for the third and fourth years £1/10 shillings per week and in the fifth year £2 per week. From 1926 Cowlishaw studied through the Solicitors Admission Board. Between 1926 and 1929 he was examined and passed subjects in legal history at an intermediate level, laws of real and personal property at an intermediate level, section one of the final examination and section two of the final examination by John Peden President of the Board of Examiners. Between 1929 and 1931 Cowlishaw failed a further set of legal examinations and ceased being a legal clerk. While he is often described as a non-practicing lawyer, he was never admitted as a solicitor in NSW. As a young man of considerable independent income he had no need to work as a lawyer.

== Mosman Council ==
He was an alderman on Mosman Council for 14 years and was twice Mayor during the years 1940 until 1945.

== Gardener ==
Renowned as a garden enthusiast Cowlishaw was a plantsman interested in a wide variety of plants but in particular the Clivia was his passion. His books All about palms: Australia's native and cultivated species written in 1929 and The cultivation of Australian native plants written in 1932 were his most notable publications.

== Collector ==
Cowlishaw was an enthusiastic collector of stamps, coins, books and paintings. In 1945, on retiring from Mosman Council, Cowlishaw donated 15 works from his personal collection of Australian colonial and early twentieth century art to the Mosman Art Collection now housed in the Mosman Art Gallery. The gallery was formerly the Mosman Methodist Church, designed by Burcham Clamp and Walter Burley Griffin, where Cowlishaw had married in 1931. In October 1984 Sotheby's Australia sold many of the works in Cowlishaw's art collection including works by John Glover, Augustus Earle, Conrad Martens, S.T. Gill, Eugene von Guerard, Nicolas Chevalier, W.C. Piguenit and Frederick Garling. The G.K. Cowlishaw Collection of 1809 books and serials relating to gardening, horticulture, botany and agriculture were donated to the National Library of Australia in 1986. The collection comprised works published in Australia, Europe and America. The books and journals have been integrated into the Australian, rare books and general collections. The Library produced a G.K. Cowlishaw bookplate which was placed in each volume. Any duplicates were transferred to Fisher Library at the University of Sydney.

== Family ==
In April 1931 Cowlishaw's mother and younger sister were killed in a motor vehicle accident. In June 1931 Cowlishaw married Eileen (Bonnie) Wellings Smith of Mosman. His former Newington Headmaster the Rev. Dr Charles Prescott officiated at the service in the Mosman Methodist Church. The Cowlishaw's went on to have four daughters: Elizabeth Madge (Betty) Ewins, Diana Helen Jones, Georgina Louise Robinson and Margaret Ann Windybank. His father died in 1954. Having moved to St Ives, New South Wales, Cowlishaw died in 1983 survived by his wife who died in 1997.

Civic offices
Preceded by Frank Pursell OBE	Mayor of Mosman; 1940 – 1943	Succeeded by Walter Hicks
Preceded by Walter Hicks	Mayor of Mosman; 1943 – 1945	Succeeded by Pat Morton
