= List of mayors of Mosman =

Mayor of Mosman Council
- Incumbent; Cr. Ann Marie Kimber (Serving Mosman) since 14 September 2024
- Style: His/Her Worship
- Appointer: Mosman Council
- Term length: One Year (1893–2012) Four years (2012–present)
- Formation: 9 June 1893
- First holder: Richard Hayes Harnett Jr.
- Deputy: Michael Randall

This is a list of the mayors of Mosman Council and its predecessor titles and organisations, a local government area in the lower north shore region of Sydney, New South Wales, Australia. The official title of mayors while holding office is His/Her Worship the Mayor of Mosman.

Australian Exhibition Schottische
MIDI render composed 1879 by William Henry Smith (1859-1929) dedicated to Patrick Jennings for the Sydney International Exhibition

The current mayor of Mosman is Councillor Ann Marie Kimber, a member of the Serving Mosman independent political alliance, who was first elected on 14 September 2024.

== History ==
Mosman was first incorporated in 1867 as the "Mossmans Ward" of the Municipality of St Leonards, which lasted until 1890 when the municipalities of Victoria, St Leonards and East St Leonards merged to form the Municipality of North Sydney, with the Mosman ward renamed as the "Mossman Ward". Following a petition submitted by residents in 1892, on 11 April 1893 the ward's separation as the Borough of Mosman was proclaimed by Lieutenant-Governor Sir Frederick Darley. The first nine-member council was elected on 9 June 1893, with the first mayor, Richard Hayes Harnett Jr., elected on the same day. From 28 December 1906, following the passing of the Local Government Act, 1906, the council was renamed as the "Municipality of Mosman". With the passing of the Local Government Act, 1993, the Municipality of Mosman was legally renamed as Mosman Council and aldermen were renamed councillors.

== List of incumbents ==
The following individuals have been elected as the Mayor of Mosman Council, or any predecessor titles.

#	Officeholder	Term start	Term end	Time in office	Notes
1	Richard Hayes Harnett Jr.	9 June 1893	16 February 1894	252 days	
2	Charles Cowles	16 February 1894	11 February 1895	360 days	
3	Thomas Bladen	11 February 1895	12 February 1896	1 year, 1 day	
4	Patrick Thomson Taylor	12 February 1896	10 December 1897	1 year, 301 days	
5	John Noble	10 December 1897	9 February 1898	61 days	
6	James Bull Alderson	9 February 1898	15 February 1899	1 year, 6 days	
7	Hugh Rose	15 February 1899	14 February 1900	364 days	
8	George William Hampshire	14 February 1900	13 February 1901	364 days	
9	Henry William Horning	13 February 1901	14 February 1902	1 year, 1 day	
10	Frederick Resolute Strange	14 February 1902	5 February 1903	356 days	
11	William Henry Smith	5 February 1903	9 February 1904	1 year, 4 days	
12	James John Glover	9 February 1904	13 February 1905	1 year, 4 days	
13	Patrick Leahy	13 February 1905	29 January 1909	3 years, 351 days	
–	James John Glover	29 January 1909	8 February 1910	1 year, 10 days	
–	Frederick Resolute Strange	8 February 1910	10 February 1911	1 year, 2 days	
14	Evan Macdonald	10 February 1911	6 February 1912	361 days	
15	David Dunn Middleton	6 February 1912	6 February 1913	1 year, 0 days	
16	William James Pigott	6 February 1913	February 1914		
17	Arthur Douglas Walker	February 1914	February 1915		
18	William Henry Smith	February 1915	February 1918		
–	Arthur Douglas Walker	February 1918	14 December 1920		
19	William Dedden	14 December 1920	6 December 1921	357 days	
20	Robert Steel Gay	6 December 1921	7 December 1922	1 year, 1 day	
21	William Henry Smith	7 December 1922	December 1923		
22	Peter Burrows	December 1923	8 December 1925		
23	Henry Carter	8 December 1925	11 December 1928	3 years, 3 days	
24	Alexander Buckle	11 December 1928	December 1931		
25	Cyril James Camplin	December 1931	December 1932		
26	Arthur Culmer Wilson Hill	December 1932	December 1933		
27	Dalton Carroll	December 1933	December 1934		
28	John Ross Wallace	December 1934	December 1935		
29	Frank Leslie Hodgson	December 1935	December 1936		
30	Arthur Culmer Wilson Hill	December 1936	December 1937		
31	Walter Charles James Hicks	December 1937	December 1938		
32	Frank Grenville Pursell OBE	December 1938	December 1940		
33	George Keith Cowlishaw	December 1940	December 1943		
–	Walter Charles James Hicks	December 1943	December 1944		
–	George Keith Cowlishaw	December 1944	December 1945		
34	Pat Morton	December 1945	10 December 1946		
35	Ronald Stark Luke OBE	10 December 1946	December 1949		
36	George Ivan Ferris OBE	December 1949	December 1953		
37	John Wolston Ellis Warre	December 1953	December 1956		
38	Russell Stanley Whybrow	December 1956	December 1961		
39	Keith Bernard Chambers	December 1961	December 1964		
40	Victor Hugh Parkinson BEM	December 1964	December 1970		
41	Ewan Aubrey Eldridge	December 1970	September 1971		
42	Lloyd Sydney Edwards	September 1971	September 1972		
43	Lenard Mackay-Cruise	September 1972	September 1974		
–	Ewan Aubrey Eldridge	September 1974	September 1976		
44	Dominic Lopez	September 1976	September 1977		
45	Peter Mellish	September 1977	September 1978		
46	Barry O'Keefe QC	September 1978	September 1983		
47	Peter Abelson	September 1983	September 1985		
–	Barry O'Keefe QC	September 1985	September 1986		
–	Dominic Lopez	September 1986	September 1987		
–	Barry O'Keefe AM QC	September 1987	September 1990		
48	Peter Clive	September 1990	September 1991		
–	Dominic Lopez	September 1991	September 1993		
49	Patricia Harvey	September 1993	September 1994		
50	Virginia Howard	September 1994	September 1997		
51	James Thomas Reid	September 1997	September 1999		
–	Patricia Harvey OAM	September 1999	September 2001		
–	James Thomas Reid	September 2001	September 2002		
52	David Strange	September 2002	September 2004		
53	Shirley Jenkins	September 2004	September 2005		
54	Denise Wilton	September 2005	September 2008		
–	Dominic Lopez OAM	September 2008	September 2009		
55	Anne Connon	September 2009	8 September 2012		
–	Peter Abelson (Serving Mosman)	8 September 2012	9 September 2017	5 years, 1 day	
56	Carolyn Corrigan (Serving Mosman)	9 September 2017	14 September 2024	7 years, 5 days	
57	Ann Marie Kimber (Serving Mosman)	September 2024	incumbent		

== Town Clerks/General Managers ==
The Local Government Act, 1993 removed the requirement that the administrative head of a council be a "Town or Shire Clerk" and specified that the head was to be known as the "General Manager".

Years	Town Clerk/General Manager	Notes
22 June 1893 – 31 July 1901	George Frederick Melbourne Withers	
1 August 1901 – 28 February 1922	William Falkland Bray	
April 1922 – 3 March 1951	Arthur Cleve Marshall	
1951 – 1972	R. S. E. Gay	
1972 – 1986	M. G. Park	
July 1986 – 13 September 2013	Viv May PSM	
16 September 2013 – 5 August 2016	Veronica Lee	
8 August 2016 – date	Dominic Johnson	

== Electoral results ==
=== 2024 ===
2024 New South Wales mayoral elections: Mosman
Party	Candidate	Votes	%	±%
Serving Mosman	Ann Kimber	8,099	48.56	+5.56
Independent	Peter Menzies	3,720	22.30	+0.98
Mosman Better	Roy Bendall	3,352	21.18	+4.49
Labor	John Wakefield	1,327	7.96	+7.96
Total formal votes		16,678	96.99	–0.05
Informal votes		518	3.01	+0.05
Turnout		17,196	81.36	–0.71
Two-candidate-preferred result
Serving Mosman	Ann Kimber	8,827	63.16	–1.62
Independent	Simon Menzies	5,149	36.84	+1.62
Serving Mosman hold		Swing	–1.62	

=== 2021 ===
2021 New South Wales mayoral elections: Mosman
Party	Candidate	Votes	%	±%
Serving Mosman	Carolyn Corrigan	7,062	43.0	+0.6
Menzies For Mayor	Peter Menzies	3,501	21.3	+1.6
Residents For Mosman	Roy Bendall	2,741	16.7	−11.6
Independent	Libby Moline	2,319	14.1	+1.0
Voice of Mosman	Sarah Harding	802	4.9	+4.9
Total formal votes		16,425	97.0	
Informal votes		501	3.0	
Turnout		16,926	82.1	
Two-candidate-preferred result
Serving Mosman	Carolyn Corrigan	8,000	64.8	+7.9
Menzies For Mayor	Peter Menzies	4,349	35.2	+35.2
Serving Mosman hold		Swing	N/A	

=== 2017 ===
2017 New South Wales mayoral elections: Mosman
Party	Candidate	Votes	%	±%
Serving Mosman	Carolyn Corrigan	5,928	39.9	+11.5
Residents For Mosman	Roy Bendall	4,192	27.8	+6.4
Independent	Simon Menzies	2,971	19.7	+6.3
Independent	Libby Moline	1,975	13.1	+3.4
Total formal votes		15,066	95.3	
Informal votes			4.7	
Turnout			75.7	
Two-candidate-preferred result
Serving Mosman	Carolyn Corrigan	7,140	56.9	
Residents For Mosman	Roy Bendall	5,415	43.1	
Serving Mosman hold		Swing		
