= Colin Still =

Australian architect (1943–2017)

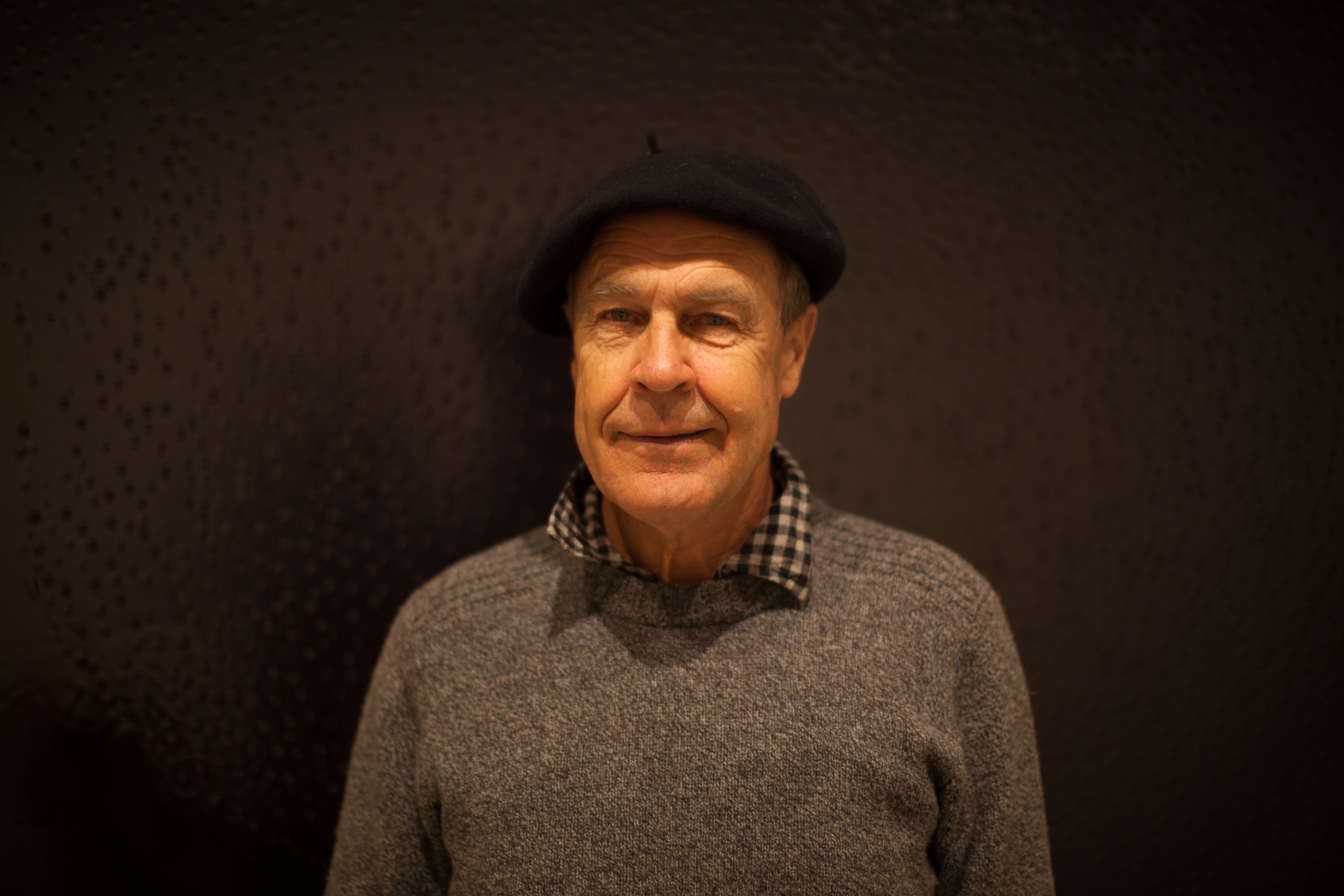
- Colin Still in 2012
- Born: 13 April 1943; Sydney, Australia
- Died: 7 August 2017 (aged 74); Sydney, New South Wales, Australia
- Education: Newington College; University of Sydney; Harvard University
- Occupation: Architect
- Spouse: Irene (née Davidenkov)
- Children: 2

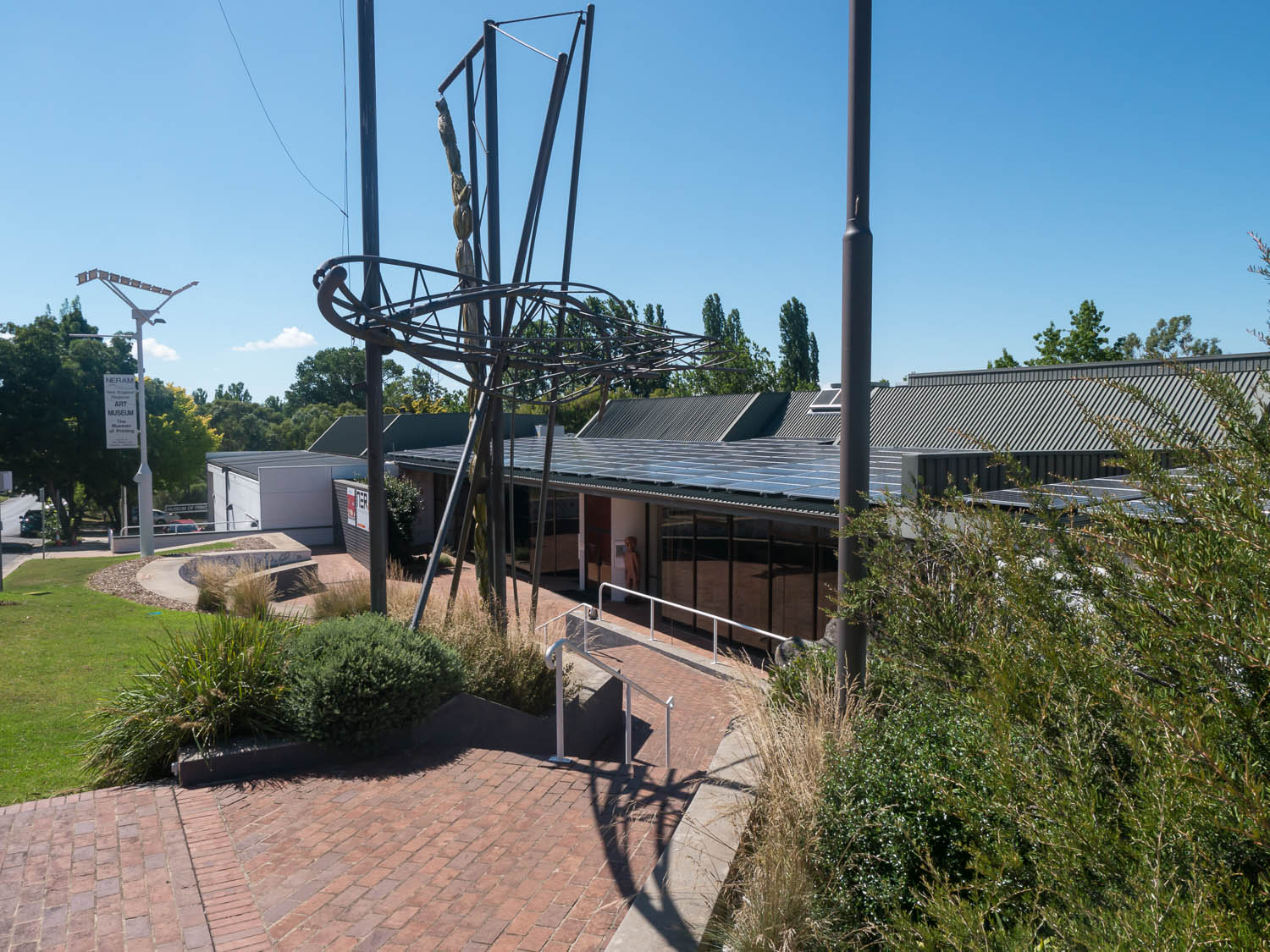
New England Regional Art Museum

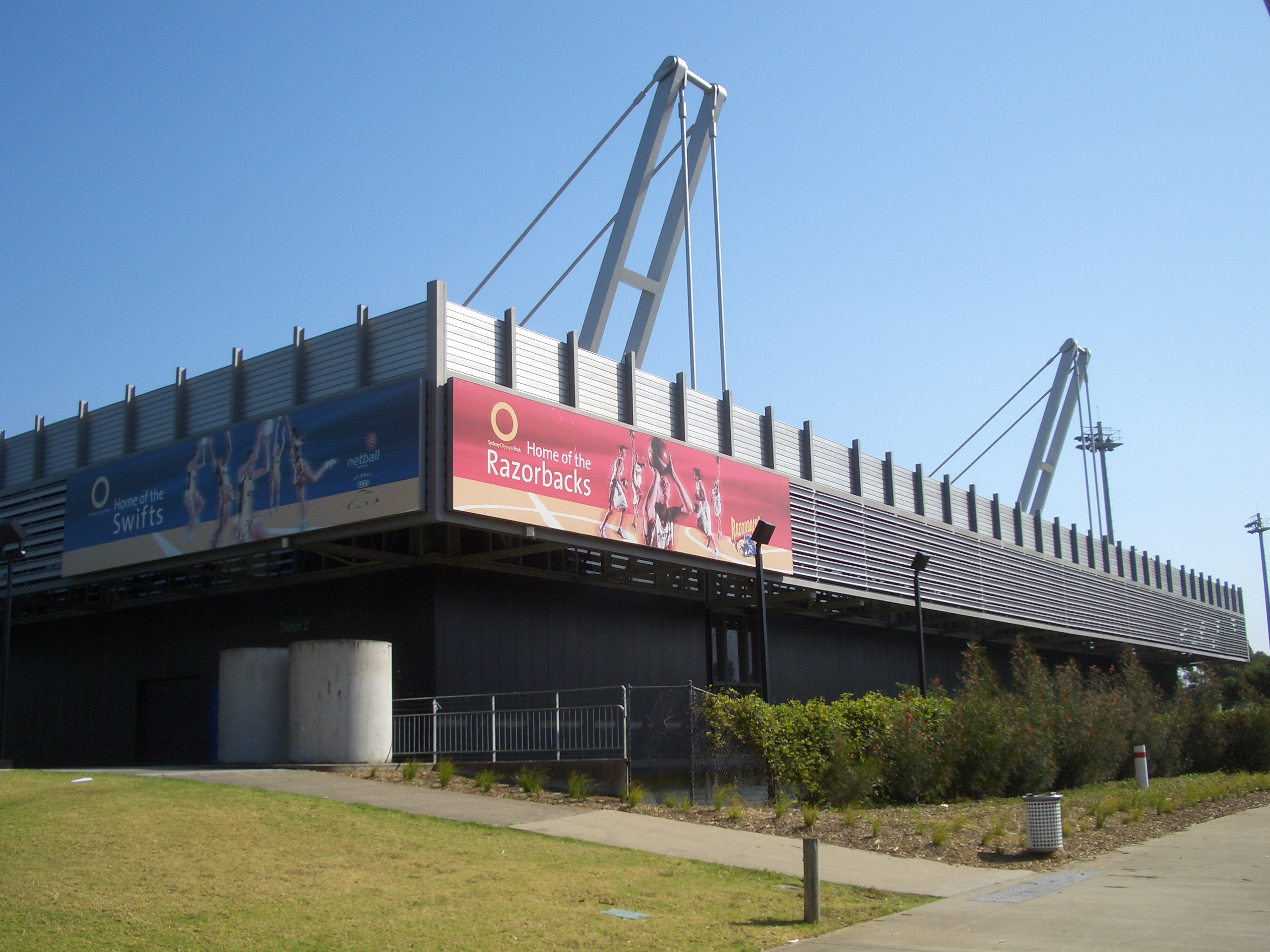
State Sports Centre

Colin Arthur Still ARAIA (13 March 1943 – 7 August 2017), was an Australian architect from Watsons Bay, in Sydney. As part of his involvement with the Australian Institute of Architects he served as a Vice President and Chair of the Environment Committee. As a landscape artist he was a finalist in several Wynne Prize exhibitions at the Art Gallery of New South Wales.

== Early life ==
Still was born to Doreen (née Costello) and Arthur Still, a Sydney based builder. He grew up in the suburb of Ashfield and was educated at Newington College. In 1950 he commenced in the Preparatory School Wyvern House and completed his Leaving Certificate in 1960. The following year Still went up to the University of Sydney where he commenced studying architecture. In the fourth year of his degree he started dating another architecture student and Still and Irene Davidenkov went on marry. He graduated in 1966 winning the University Medal and RAIA Silver Medal as the outstanding architecture student of the year. After graduateding from Sydney Still went to Harvard University to take a Master of Architecture degree.

== Career ==
- Trainee in Government Architects Branch
  NSW Department of Public Works
- Architect NSW Department of Public Works
- Assistant Government Architect
  NSW Department of Public Works
- 1994–2003 Director of Cox Architects
- 2003–2017 Still Design

== Notable projects ==
- 1967 Parramatta Central Boiler House
- 1973 State Brickworks, Blacktown
- 1973 Grafton Police Station & Court House Restoration
- 1973–1975 Still House, 8 Victoria Street, Watsons Bay
  (Colin & Irene Still Architects)
- 1975 Rodgers House, 174 Queen Street Woollahra
  (Colin & Irene Still Architects)
- 1981 St George Institute of Education (SGIE) UNSW
- 1982 Armidale Civic Centre, Armidale
- 1978–1980 Oatley Senior Campus
  Former Alexander Mackie College of Advanced Education
- 1984 State Sports Centre, Homebush
- Australian Museum Extensions
- Orange Regional Library & Art Gallery Orange
- Flemington Markets
- NSW Government Stores, Wetherill Park
- CSIRO Research Laboratories, ANSTO Lucas Heights
- Lizard Island Research Station
- Taronga Zoo Aquatic Centre Proposal, Sydney
- National Naval Aviation Museum, Nowra
- University of Western Sydney, Campus Masterplan
- Newington Business Park, Olympic Park Village
- NERAM, Armidale
- Still House, Seal Rocks, NSW
- 2001 Lake Macquarie City Art Gallery
- 2008 Lake Macquarie City Art Gallery Seminar Art Room additions
- Coffs Harbour (Henry Kendall) Arts Centre, Coffs Harbour RAIA award for unrealised projects
- High Density Residential, Riverside, Singapore Towers
- Research Laboratories, CSIRO, ANSTO Lucas Heights, Lizard Island Research Station
- Observatory Hotel, Cronulla Resort
- Stadiums in China, Korea, Malaysia
- Exhibition and convention centres: Sydney and China
- Sydney Game Fishing Club, Watsons Bay Wharf

Buildings on the RAIA NSW Register of Twentieth Century Buildings of Significance

- 1973-5 Still House, 8 Victoria Street, Watsons Bay (C & I Still Architects)
- 1978–80 Oatley Senior Campus, Former Alexander Mackie College of Advanced Education
- 1986 Orange Regional Library & Art Gallery Orange

== Awards ==
- 1966 RAIA Silver Medal as the Outstanding student of architecture for the year
- RAIA Merit Award Category A 1973 State Brickworks, Blacktown
- RAIA 1973 "Sisalkraft' Scholarship
- RAIA Merit Award Category B 1976 Still House, 8 Victoria Street, Watsons Bay
- RAIA Merit Award Category B House, 174 Queen Street, Woollahra
- RAIA Merit Award Sydney Olympic Park State Sports Centre, Sarah Durack Avenue, Homebush Bay, Auburn
- RAIA Merit Award 1981 Alexander Mackie College of Advanced Education
- RAIA Sir John Sulman Medal 1986 Orange Regional Library & Art Gallery Orange
- RAIA Blacket Award Commendation 1986 Orange Regional Library & Art Gallery, Orange
- AIA Dangar Award

== Death ==
Colin died at home in Watsons Bay on 7 August, aged 74, after a protracted battle against Prostate Cancer. His funeral with a congregation overflowing into the garden was held at St Peter's Church, Watsons Bay. His life was then celebrated at a wake at the Watsons Bay Game Fishing Club attended by friends and architectural colleagues – including many young architects who he mentored. Colin was survived by his widow Irene, a skilled architect and illustrator in her own right, as well as children Ben and Nina, and four grandchildren.
