= Milton Corporation =

Australian listed investment company

Milton Corporation Limited
- Company type: Public
- Traded as: ASX: MLT
- Industry: Diversified investments
- Founded: 1938
- Headquarters: Sydney, Australia
- Key people: Robert Millner, Non-Executive Chairman
- Website: Official website

Milton Corporation Limited is an Australian listed investment company.

Milton was founded in 1938 and listed on the Sydney Stock Exchange in 1958. Its chairman is Robert Millner and its managing director is Frank Gooch. It invests in Australian listed equities, trusts, interest bearing securities and real property. The focus of the company is in investing on a long-term basis with the objective of deriving dividend income which it passes on to its own shareholders.

It is based in Sydney, Australia. In June 2021, it agreed terms to be taken over by Washington H Soul Pattinson.
