= Warwick Cathro =

- Born: 8 March 1948 (age 78); Newtown, New South Wales
- Occupation: Librarian

Academic background
- Education: Newington College
- Alma mater: University of Sydney

Academic work
- Institutions: National Library of Australia
- Notable works: Trove

Warwick Scott Cathro (born 8 March 1948) was pivotal in the development of Trove, an Australian online library database aggregator hosted by the National Library of Australia. The Australian Library and Information Association (ALIA) says of him; "His extraordinary work in developing and implementing standards; advancing innovative solutions; championing national sectoral infrastructure and encouraging communication and debate in the profession, place Warwick Cathro among the most important Australian library and information practitioners of our time."

== Early life ==
Cathro was born in Newtown, New South Wales and attended Newington College (1957-1964) commencing as a preparatory school student in Wyvern House. In 1959, he was the Dux of Wyvern and in 1964 he was Dux of the College and received the Halse Rogers and Schofield Prizes. Following school, he commenced study at the University of Sydney and in 1969 graduated as a Bachelor of Science and was awarded his PhD in physical chemistry in 1975.

== Library career ==
Cathro joined the staff of the National Library of Australia in January 1978 and on his retirement in 2011 held the position of Assistant Director-General, Resource Sharing and Innovation. During that time, Cathro played a leading role in the Library's delivery of innovative network services to the Australian library community including the Australian Bibliographic Network, Australian National Bibliographic Database, and Libraries Australia. Cathro is considered the founder of Trove, which is the National Library's discovery service and links Australians to resources available online, and in Australian libraries, cultural institutions and research collections. It highlights material collected by 1100 Australian institutions and links to more than 120,000,000 items, including full-text books, journal and newspaper articles, images, music, sound, video, maps, websites, letters, archives, and biographies of prominent Australians. In 2010, the site received 3 million visits and now boasts an average of 25,000 unique visitors a day. Visitors to the site assist in correcting the machine-readable indexed text in the full-text newspaper section.

In 1997, Cathro was one of the primary organizers of the fourth Dublin Core Metadata Initiative's workshop which was hosted by the National Library in Canberra.

== Honours ==
Cathro was awarded the H.C.L. Anderson Award by ALIA in 2012 for his contribution to the development of Trove, the discovery service and national newspaper digitisation project. Other awards include the ALIA Library Manager of the Year (1991) and the Victorian Association for Library Automation R.D. Williamson Award (1993).

== Oral history ==
An oral history interview with Cathro, recorded in 2018, is available at the National Library of Australia.
