= Robert Millner =

Australian corporate executive (born 1950)

Robert Millner AO
- Born: Robert Dobson Millner; 4 September 1950 (age 75); Sydney, Australia
- Education: Newington College
- Occupation: Company director
- Board member of: Soul Patts; New Hope Group; Brickworks; Choiseul Investments; NBN Television
- Father: Thomas Pattinson Millner
- Family: Col. T. G. Millner (grandfather); Jim Millner (uncle); William Frederick Pattinson (great-uncle); Lewy Pattinson (great-grandfather)

Robert Dobson Millner AO (born 4 September 1950) is an Australian corporate executive. He is the chairman of Soul Patts, Australia's second oldest publicly-listed corporation, and the chairman of New Hope Group, Brickworks, Choiseul Investments and NBN Television.

== Biography ==
After leaving Newington College he worked as a stockbroker for two years. From 1970 until 1983 he farmed in Cowra and in 1984 joined the family business, Soul Patts, as a director. In 1997, he was appointed deputy chairman of the company and since 1999 he has been chairman of the company.

== Personal life ==
=== Honours ===
Millner was appointed an Officer of the Order of Australia in the 2023 King's Birthday Honours for "distinguished service to business, to rugby union as an administrator, and to the community through philanthropic contributions".

=== Net worth ===
Year	Financial Review Rich List		Forbes Australia's 50 Richest	
Year	Rank	Net worth (A$)	Rank	Net worth (US$)
2018	69 ▲	$1.16 billion ▲		
2019	79 ▼	$1.30 billion ▲		
2020	89 ▼	$1.16 billion ▼		
2021	74 ▲	$1.54 billion ▲		
2022	104 ▲	$1.40 billion ▼		
2023	104	$1.34 billion ▼		
2024		$1.50 billion ▲		
2025	108	$1.64 billion ▲		

Legend
Icon	Description
Steady	Has not changed from the previous year
▲	Has increased from the previous year
▼	Has decreased from the previous year

Business positions
Preceded by Jim Millner	Chairman of Soul Patts; 1999 – present	Incumbent
