= Lewy Pattinson =

English businessman (1852 – 1944)

Lewy Miall Pattinson
- Born: 10 March 1852; Hexham, England
- Died: January 1944 (aged 91)
- Occupation: Businessman
- Known for: Founder of Soul Patts
- Spouse: Mary Jane Parker (1858-1937)
- Children: William Frederick Pattinson (1889–1970); Mary (May) Millner (1890–1990); Jenny-Ann Pattinson (b.1894); Lewy Norman Pattinson (b.1896)
- Family: Jim Millner (grandson); Robert Millner (great grandson)

Lewy Miall Pattinson (10 March 1852 – January 1944) was an English businessman, who founded the pharmaceutical firm Soul Patts.

== Early life and immigration from England ==
Lewy Miall Pattinson was born to parents Wiliam Pattinson and Annie Sinclair on 10 March 1852 in Hexham, England. He had three siblings William, Matthew and Annie. Pattinson married Mary Jane Parker in July 1887 in Tynemouth, England.

Pattinson had a background in engineering with the family company Pattinson and Davison, but later gained exposure to the pharmaceutical industry through his brother William, which led him to explore opportunities in this field in Sydney, Australia which he visited in 1881. He bought "Hexham" at Abbotsford in 1900.

== Founder of Washington H. Soul Pattinson ==
Pattinson returned to Australia for good in 1886 and opened a pharmacy in Balmain known as Pattinson and Co. The firm expanded to include stores in Redfern and North Sydney, and its own in-house manufacturing and distribution facilities.

In 1902 Pattinson & Company bought out his competitor W. H. Soul to expand the business further. The firm was listed on the Australian Stock Exchange in 1903 and is Australia's second oldest public company. Today it is a diversified conglomerate with investments in pharmaceuticals, telecommunications, minerals and financial services.

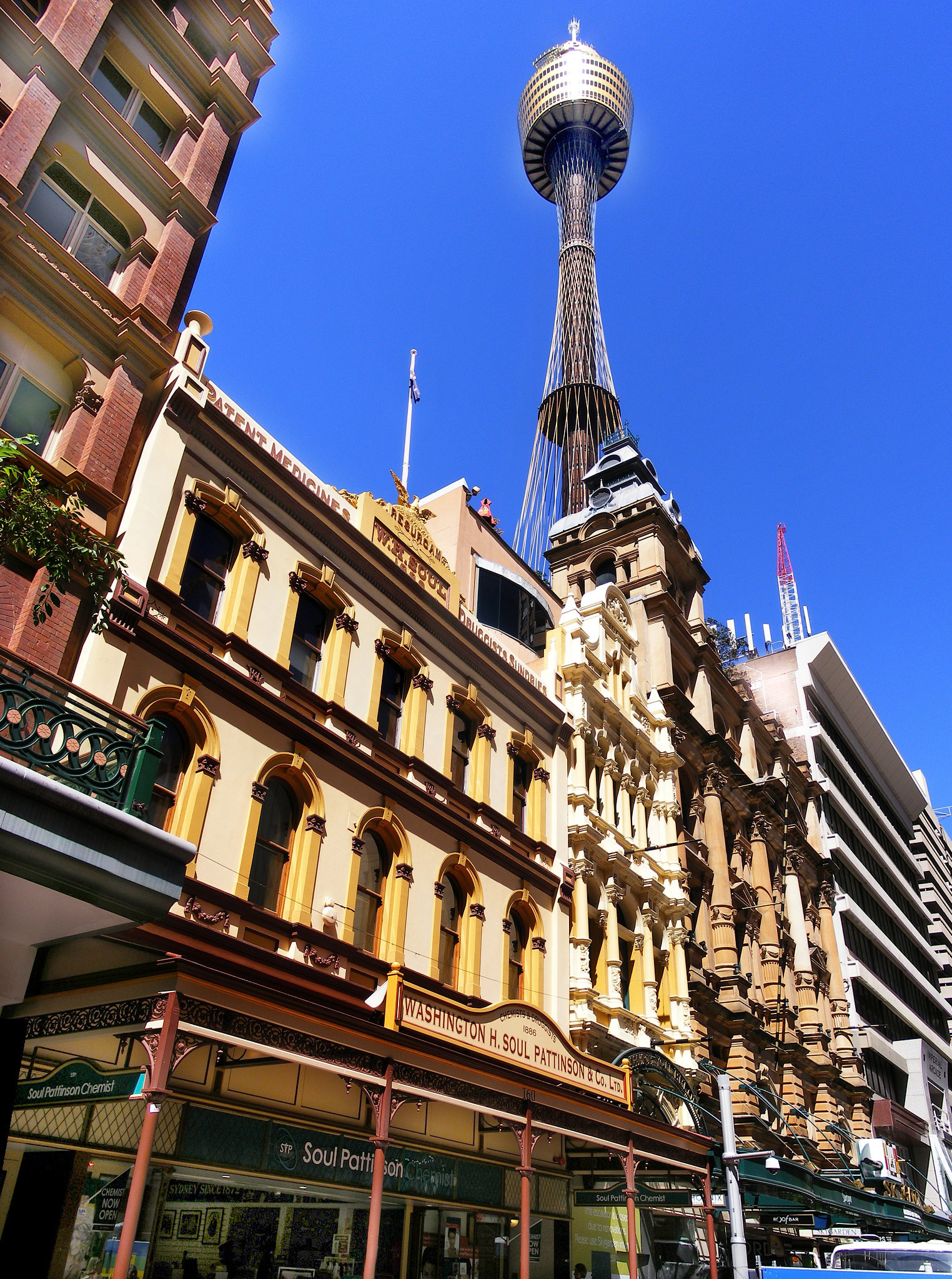
Soul Patts in Pitt Street Mall, Sydney

== Death ==
In 1944 Lewy Pattinson died aged 91. He was succeeded by his four children William, Mary, Jenny-Ann and Lewy-Norman, and 12 grandchildren.

Pattinson's son Dr. William Frederick Pattinson succeeded him as chairman of Soul Patts. His grandson, Jim Millner and great grandson, Robert Millner, were subsequently chairmen of the company.

== Philanthropy ==
Lewy Pattinson was known for his community and charitable donations. He donated the L. M. Pattinson Aerial Ambulance which was the first aeroplane in the Royal Flying Doctor Service.

The Lewy Miall Pattinson Scholarship was founded in 1943 by a gift of £5000 from Pattinson and supplemented by a bequest of an additional sum of £5,000 on his death in January 1944, for the encouragement of the study of pharmaceutical science at the University of Sydney.

There is a street named - Pattinson Crescent - in the suburb of Flynn, Australian Capital Territory.

Business positions
New title	Chairman of Soul Patts; 1902 – ????	Succeeded by William Frederick Pattinson
