= Charles John Prescott =

English-born Australian army chaplain, minister and headmaster

Reverend Dr Charles Prescott
- Born: Charles John Prescott; 9 June 1857; Bridport, Dorset, England
- Died: 12 June 1946 (aged 89); Sydney, New South Wales
- Education: Kingswood School, Bath, Somerset; Worcester College, University of Oxford; The Queen's College, Birmingham
- Occupations: Methodist minister Headmaster; Wesleyan Ladies' College & Newington College
- Spouse: Annie Elizabeth (née) Price
- Children: 2 sons & 3 daughters
- Website: Charles John Prescott ADB

Charles John Prescott (9 June 1857 – 12 June 1946) was an English–born Australian Methodist minister, headmaster and army chaplain.

== Early life ==
Prescott was born in Bridport, Dorset, the eldest child of a Wesleyan clergyman. Educated at Kingswood School, Bath, Somerset, he attended Worcester College, Oxford and graduated BA in 1880 and MA in 1893. He began theological studies in Birmingham but on his marriage in 1882 migrated to Sydney to improve his wife's health.

== Ministry and school career ==
On arrival in Australia, Prescott was appointed to Parramatta Wesleyan Circuit and as a part-time tutor at the Wesleyan Theological Institution. In 1886, he was ordained as a minister and became the founding president and headmaster of the Wesleyan Ladies' College, Burwood. He introduced challenging academic studies for girls, as well as music and competitive games. In time ex-pupils excelled at the University of Sydney, enhancing the college's reputation. He also established a co-educational kindergarten, probably the first in the Australia. Prescott gave the college colours, a crest, a motto, a uniform and a magazine in the tradition of English public schools. He was greatly helped by his wife, Annie, who took charge of the domestic arrangements and music. In 1900 he moved to Newington College, as president and headmaster. He was the first to hold that dual office at Newington. He fostered the ideal of a balanced liberal education within a Christian environment, with an emphasis on mathematics and classical studies. Other emphases were correct English, team games, and commitment to 'family, school, King and God'.

== Marriage and family ==
Prescott married Annie Elizabeth Price (d.1931) on 30 August 1882 at Cardiff, before migrating to Australia. They had five children: William Arnold Prescott (1883–1946); Annie Constance Prescott (d. in infancy 1885); Theodora Mary Prescott (1886–1966); Kathleen Margaret (Kitty) Prescott OBE (1888–1984); and Clarence Gordon Prescott MC (1892–1974). Theodora, Kitty and Clarence were all born at MLC School during Rev. Prescott's time as Principal. Annie Prescott died in 1931 and on his death Prescott was survived by two sons and two daughters.

== Later life ==
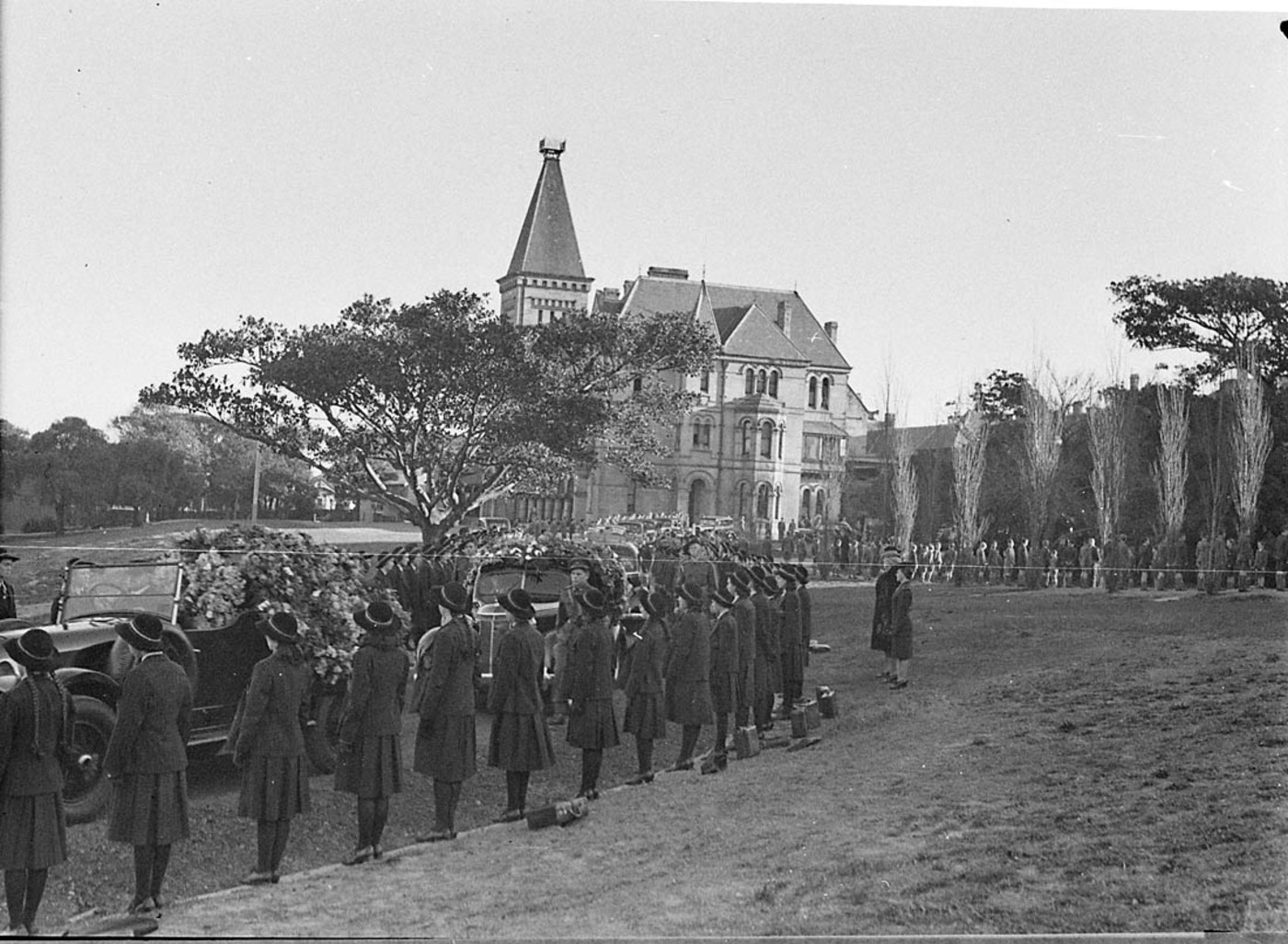
Prescott's funeral procession progressing on Cowlishaw Drive at Newington with MLC girls and Newington boys lining the avenue.

Prescott was elected president of the New South Wales Methodist Conference in 1910 and served as acting senior army chaplain during World War I, making many visits to camps and barracks. He was senior Methodist chaplain from 1919. In that year he was awarded an honorary doctorate of divinity by Emory University, Georgia, USA. Esteemed by his peers, Prescott became the spokesman for other headmasters in negotiations with governments, the university and Department of Education. He was a founder and several times chairman of the Teachers' Association of New South Wales and the foundation chairman, in 1923, of the Headmasters' Association. He retired from Newington in 1931 after a record term. One of the houses at Newington is named Prescott House in his memory as is Prescott Hall. In retirement he continued on boards and committees and contributed to the Sydney Morning Herald. His portrait in oils by Reginald Jerrold-Nathan hangs at Newington.

== Publications ==
- Pastoral Letters (Syd, 1911)
- Romance of School (Syd, 1932)

| Preceded by Rev James Egan Moulton | President; Newington College; 1900–1931 | Succeeded by Position abolished |
| Preceded by Edward William Cornwall | Headmaster; Newington College; 1900–1931 | Succeeded by Philip Le Couteur |
