= Soul Patts =

Australian investment company

Washington H. Soul Pattinson and Company Limited
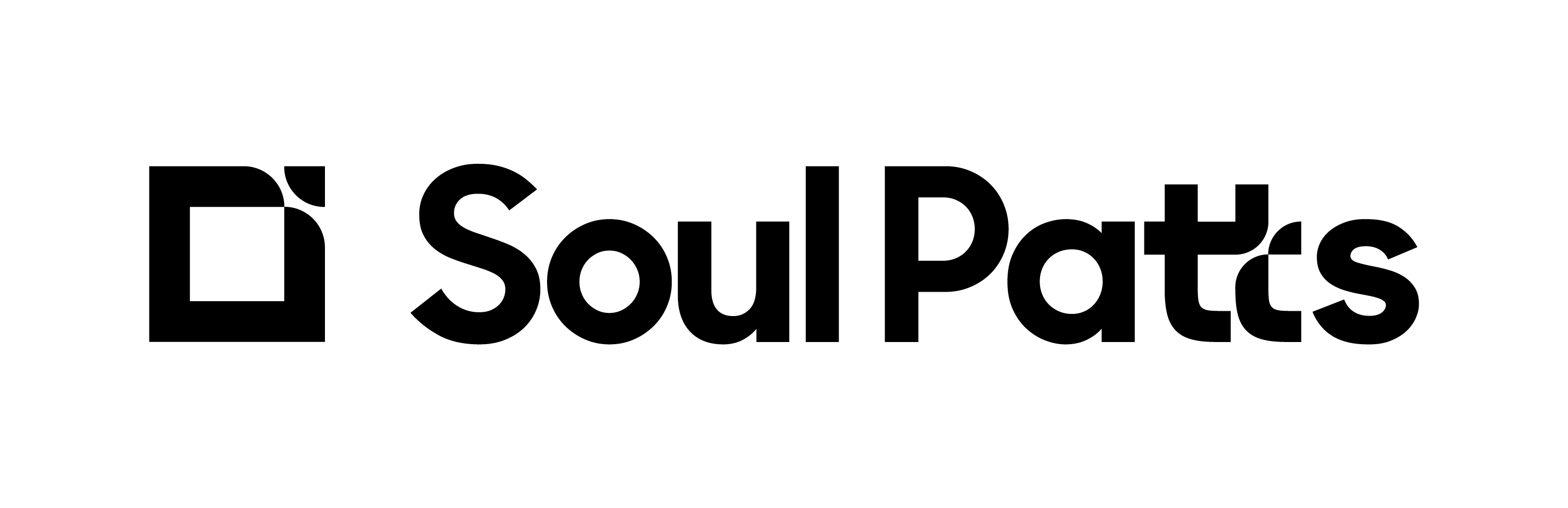
- Trade name: Soul Patts
- Company type: Public
- Traded as: ASX: SOL
- Industry: Diversified
- Founded: 21 January 1903; 123 years ago
- Founder: Lewy Pattinson
- Headquarters: Sydney, Australia
- Key people: Robert Millner (Chairman); Todd Barlow (Managing Director)
- Revenue: $499 million (2024)
- Website: soulpatts.com.au

Washington H. Soul Pattinson and Company Limited, trading as Soul Patts, is an Australian investment company. With origins in pharmacy operations, the company has evolved to become an investment company with a diverse portfolio in various asset classes (equities, private companies, private credit, and property).

== History ==
In 1872, Caleb Soul and his son Washington Handley opened a pharmacy store in Pitt Street, Sydney. In 1886, Lewy Pattinson opened a pharmacy in Balmain. In April 1902, Pattinson bought Soul out with the business incorporated as Washington H Soul Pattinson & Company Limited.

On 21 January 1903, the company was listed on the Sydney Stock Exchange.

In June 2021, terms were agreed to purchase Milton Corporation.

In June 2025, Soul Patts and Brickworks, that already held a 26% stake in Soul Patts, agreed to a $14 billion merger. The deal is subject to shareholder approval. Upon completion of the acquisition in September, Soul Patts owns 72% of the merged entity.

== Investments ==
=== Current ===
Soul Patts' larger investments include:

- New Hope Group (39%)
- TPG Telecom (13%)

=== Former ===
- NBN Television
- Australian Pharmaceutical Industries

== Chairmen ==
The following individuals have served as chairmen of the company:

Ordinal	Officerholder	Term start	Term end	Time in office	Notes
1	Lewy Pattinson	1903	1905	1–2 years	
2	Thomas Hughes	1906	1929	22–23 years	
(1)	Lewy Pattinson	1929	unknown		
3			c. 1957		
4	William Frederick Pattinson	1957	1969	11–12 years	
5	Jim Millner	1969	1999	29–30 years	
6	Robert Millner	1999	incumbent	26–27 years	

== See also ==
- List of oldest companies in Australia
