= Brickworks (company) =

Australian brick manufacturer

Brickworks Limited
- Company type: Public
- Traded as: ASX: BKW
- Industry: Building and construction materials
- Founded: 21 June 1934
- Fate: Merged with Soul Patts
- Headquarters: Horsley Park, New South Wales, Australia
- Revenue: ▲ A$1,093 million (2022)
- Operating income: ▼ A$982 million (2022)
- Number of employees: 2,119 (2022)
- Website: www.brickworks.com.au

Brickworks Limited is Australia's largest brick manufacturer, consisting of four divisions – Building Products Australia, Building Products North America, Industrial Property, and Investments.

Building Products Australia includes Austral Bricks (the country's largest producer of bricks), along with other brands such as Austral Masonry, Bowral Bricks and Bristile Roofing. Building Products North America is a brick producer in the northeast of the United States.

Brickworks has developed industry property assets in conjunction with its partner the Goodman Group, and possesses a long-standing investment in Soul Patts.

== History ==
Brickworks was founded on 21 June 1934 in New South Wales in an effort to protect the Australian brick manufacturing industry from the impact of the Great Depression. Initially, the company alternated from public to private but has remained public since 1939. As a manufacturer of building materials, the company eventually became involved in property sales, property trust, and waste management. This led to the development of The Land and Development Group, which became the second main part of Brickworks Limited business model, coexisting with The Building Product Group and The Investments Group.

=== 1930s ===
The Great Depression had a severe impact on the brick manufacturing industry. In response, the NSW Brick Master's Association dispensed unnecessary yards in order to make brick manufacturing more efficient and economic. The Brickworks Limited company was created, and focused on marketing and distributing bricks and clay products.

William King Dawes, who was general manager of Austral Bricks and managing director of Brickworks, spearheaded a newly established council – The Council of Brick Manufacturers. As chairman, Dawes combined Brickworks Limited with various companies and independent brickyard owners in a 10-year agreement to secure the viability of the company. Part of this agreement was an imposed fee to cover marketing, distribution, and selling expenses of bricks and other clay products. In 1935, the St. Peters Agreement was signed. It divided Sydney into zones serviced by local brickyards. Manly Brick & Tile Company, a yard that did not survive the depression, still possessed millions of bricks in inventory that were then purchased by Clay Industries Limited, a subsidiary of Brickworks Limited.

In 1936, Austral Bricks revised its Articles of Association to become privatised, and Brickworks Limited expanded its capacity by acquiring State Brickworks from the Government of New South Wales. In the same year, 14 tile roofing companies joined forces to control the quantity of production against the demand to prevent the decline in prices and formed Roof Tiles Limited. In the following years, Brickworks Limited bought a number of assets, properties, and companies that were running out of resources. In 1939, during wartime, a strict price control on bricks and lending restrictions on cooperative societies was implemented, and the Brickworks Limited reverted to a public company.

=== 1940s ===
The completion of building construction and building repairs plummeted from 8,138 in 1940 down to only 582 in 1943 due to the high fees to secure government approval. In spite of this, Dawes kept brick yards running with the intention of storing the produced bricks in inventory and then selling them at a premium price after the war ended. However, the war effort required facilities for the production and storage of the navy's supplies. Brickworks rented out some of their sites, and converted yards and kilns into ammunition stores. After the war ended, Brickworks made a claim for compensation which was paid over four years later.

In 1943, shareholders of Austral voted to sell shares to Brickworks Limited and unify as one company with the agreement to appoint Dawes as managing director for the first five years, and the next five as a general manager. Brickworks Limited now owned majority of the shares in Austral Bricks. In 1945, the government requirement to secure permits in order to construct a single unit dwelling place were finally lifted.

=== 1950s ===
During this period, Brickworks Limited gained full control of Austral Bricks, becoming one of the largest brick manufacturing companies in Australia. Towards the end of the decade, Brickworks purchased Rochedale Brickworks for only 29 500 pounds, allowing the company to enter the Queensland market. In 1959, Brickworks acquired large numbers of land and property to ensure the company had an abundance of raw materials and supply of resources for brick manufacturing.

=== 1960s ===
Brickworks began to improve sites, modernize manufacturing processes, and the construction of tunnel kilns for extruded texture bricks at its Horsley Park site began. Another company, Punchbowl Brick and Pipe Company Pty. Ltd., was purchased. In 1961, Brickworks Limited was listed on the Australian Securities Exchange, and a new plant in Wallgrove opened. In 1965, three tunnel kilns were in full operation at the Wallgrove site. Then in 1965, a second plant in Wallgrove was opened, and additional kilns were built in 1969 to handle the demand for production. (A third plant at Wallgrove follows shortly in 1972). In 1969, Brickworks entered into a cross-holding agreement with Soul Patts.

=== 1980s ===
On 10 August 1981, company leader W.K. Dawes died. Brickworks and Austral also closed some of their sites. With the advancement of technology in the 1980s, some manual processes are made redundant and replaced by automated processes. Several sites were refurbished and completely revamped into automated facilities. By 1985, Brickworks owned 42.8% of Soul Patts.

=== 1990s ===
During this decade, Brickworks Limited launched a number of new products, converted sites, and rebranded some of the companies they owned, in response to an evolving market and changes in demand. The 1st Governor Sandstock was produced, the new Austral Slick Brick was launched, and the Punchbowl site was converted into a terracotta tile operation. Punchbowl Pipe Pty Ltd was rebranded to Australia Pty Ltd, Austral pipes Australia was renamed The Austral Tile Company. Brookvale Brickworks, which had been running since 1907, was closed, and pioneer brick factory at Riverview, Queensland, was acquired.

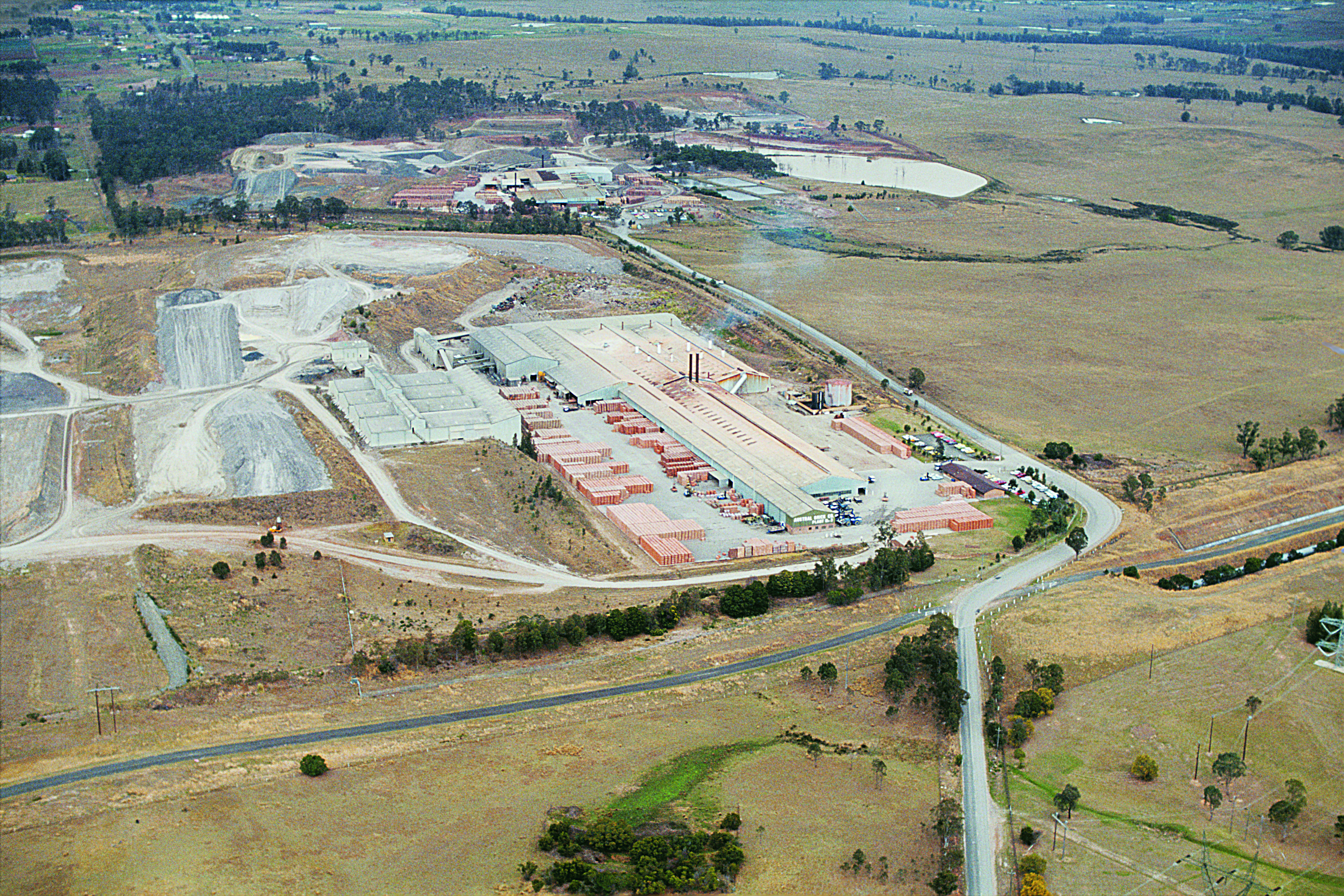
Aerial view of Plant 3 at Brickworks’ Horsley Park site.

=== 2000s ===
At the start of the new millennium, the digital age inflicted a considerable impact on market behaviour. Austral Bricks adapted to this change by launching their own online ordering system – the E-brick. The following year they introduced Terracade, Austral's Terracotta Façade system. Later that year, Austral commissioned a new $2 million floor tile factory at Punchbowl site.

Brickworks Limited continued making substantial investments: buying stakes in Bristle Limited, an Australia-based roof tiles, pavers and bricks manufacturer, purchasing Bowral Bricks company and acquiring Eureka Tiles Pty Ltd. (which later merged with The Austral Tile Company and formed Eureka Tiles Australia).

By the 2003, Brickworks Limited had acquired 100% of Bristle Limited, and started a new endeavor in the timber industry and bought Auswest Timbers, a timber producer in Western Australia. Additionally, Brickworks Limited continued purchasing bankable construction materials companies. From 2005 to 2010 Brickworks purchased GB Masonry, Caloundra Blocks, Whitsunday Concrete and Block, AYR Masonry Smart State Blocks, Brick and Block Masonry Plant and Gocrete.

=== 2010s ===
In 2011, Brickworks Limited continued to acquire companies, such as East Coast Masonry in Coffs Harbour and a timber mill and processing centre owned by Gunns Ltd. southwest of Western Australia. Brickworks also ventured into a new line of production and dedicated it an entire division: Brickworks Building products division for Austral Precast, the largest precast concrete panel producer in Australia.

In 2012, demands for precast concrete increased and in response Brickworks expanded their company and bought CPS Precast. This same year, Brickworks Limited finally gains ownership of the remaining 50% of the share in their 50/50 joint venture with Daniel Robertson Australia Pty Ltd (which was established in 2006).

In March 2012, Boral sold two of its masonry plants to Brickworks and Austral. The following year, Boral’s Prospect masonry plant was also sold to Brickworks.

For the financial year 2013–2014 Brickworks Limited paid zero tax as reported in by the Australian Taxation Office.

In March 2016 Lindsay R. Partridge estimated that Brickworks Limited is importing about one million bricks from Spain a month due to a lower shipping cost, which might have undue consequences for its own employees. In October 2017, Brickworks acquired UrbanStone, a manufacturer of commercial and residential stone and concrete paving products, previously owned by Schaffer Corporation.

In November 2017, at their 83rd Annual General Meeting, Brickworks announced the establishment of Southern Cross Cement, a joint venture company owned by Brickworks, the Neilsen Group and the Neumann Group. Southern Cross Cement has been granted approval for the construction of a circa $50 million cement import terminal in Brisbane

November 2018 saw the acquisition of Glen-Gery, the fourth largest brick manufacturer in the United States, which was the company's first major overseas investment. 2018 also saw the grand opening of the new Brickworks Design Studio in the Sydney central business district in Barrack Street.

Further acquisitions followed in 2019, with Iowa-based Sioux City Brick acquired in August, followed by the acquisition of Redland Brick in February 2020.

=== 2020s ===
In 2020, Amazon announced plans to construct Australia's largest warehouse and distribution facility in land held by the Brickworks-Goodman Joint Venture Trust in the Western Sydney suburb of Oakdale West. The distribution facility will be a development for the JV Trust, a 50-50 joint venture between Brickworks and Goodman Group. On 14.9 hectares, the 26-metre high-bay facility will comprise three mezzanine levels providing a total floor space of 191,170 sqm. The building is targeted to be completed in the second half of 2021. Amazon is the second customer to pre-commit to Oakdale West, following the announcement of Coles Group in January 2019.

March 2022 saw the opening of Brickworks Flagship Design Studio in New York City on Fifth Avenue, with two additional design studios also opening in Philadelphia in 2021 and Baltimore in 2022.

In June 2025, Brickworks and minority owner Soul Patts agreed to a $14 billion merger, whereby Brickworks would own 19% of the merged entity. The merger completed in September following which Brickworks was delisted and the merged company was renamed Washington H. Soul Pattinson and Company, trading under the ticker "SOL".

== Corporate governance ==
Brickworks Limited is headquartered in Horsley Park and operates in all states throughout Australia and in New Zealand. Brickworks Limited is publicly traded on the Australian Securities Exchange and exchanges under company code BKW. Investments of the company represent 39% interest in Soul Patts and have provided a stabilizer to the often volatile Building Products earnings stream.

== Corporate structure ==
Under the Brickworks Limited umbrella are four main groups: Building Products Australia, Building Products North America, Property, and Investments.

1. Building Products Australia is a leading Australian manufacturer and distributor of building products, and up until 2002 consisted only of brick manufacturing across New South Wales and Queensland. This branch is responsible for the operation of the company's 13 current brands of building products, including sourcing raw materials, manufacturing, warehousing, distribution and logistics, marketing, promotion, and sales.

This branch is also responsible for research, development and design of new products to cater or serve the demands of the building industry and the market in general.

In total, Building Products Australia comprises 68 locations in the country including manufacturing plants and Design Studios and Centres such as its flagship Sydney Design Studio.

2. Building Products North America was established upon the acquisition of Glen-Gery in November 2018. This was followed by the acquisition of Sioux City Brick in August 2019 and Redland Brick in February 2020.

With a position in the Midwest, Northeast and Mid-Atlantic states, this group has 28 locations across the continent, being manufacturing plants, masonry supply centres, and Design Studios, including its soon-to-be-opened flagship New York City Design Studio on Fifth Avenue.

3. Property exists to maximise the value of surplus land created by the Building Products business. Operational land that becomes surplus to the business needs is transferred to the Property division where it is assessed for optimum land use.

The Joint Venture Industrial Property Trust is a 50/50% partnership between Brickworks and Goodman Industrial Trust. Over the past decade it has grown significantly and now has a total asset value of over $2.1 billion. After including debt, Brickworks 50% share of the Property Trust has an equity value of $727 million.

The Property branch of the company consists of:

- Land Sales
- Property Trust
- Waste Management

The business maximises the value of surplus land through:

a. Residential and other land to be:

- Rezoned, rehabilitated & prepared for sale by Brickworks
- Sold to the open market

b. Industrial Land to be:

- Rezoned and rehabilitated by Brickworks
- Assessed for inclusion in a property trust and held long term

In addition to the Property Trust, the Company holds around 3,600 hectares of operational land and 370 hectares of development land. The company also holds 3,200 hectares of land in North America

4. Investments primarily consists of a 39.4% stake in Soul Patts, an S&P/ASX100 listed company (ASX: SOL). It provides a steady cash-flow stream via dividends that shelters the business during downturns related to the construction industry as well as the overall economy, allowing for long-term strategic decision making.

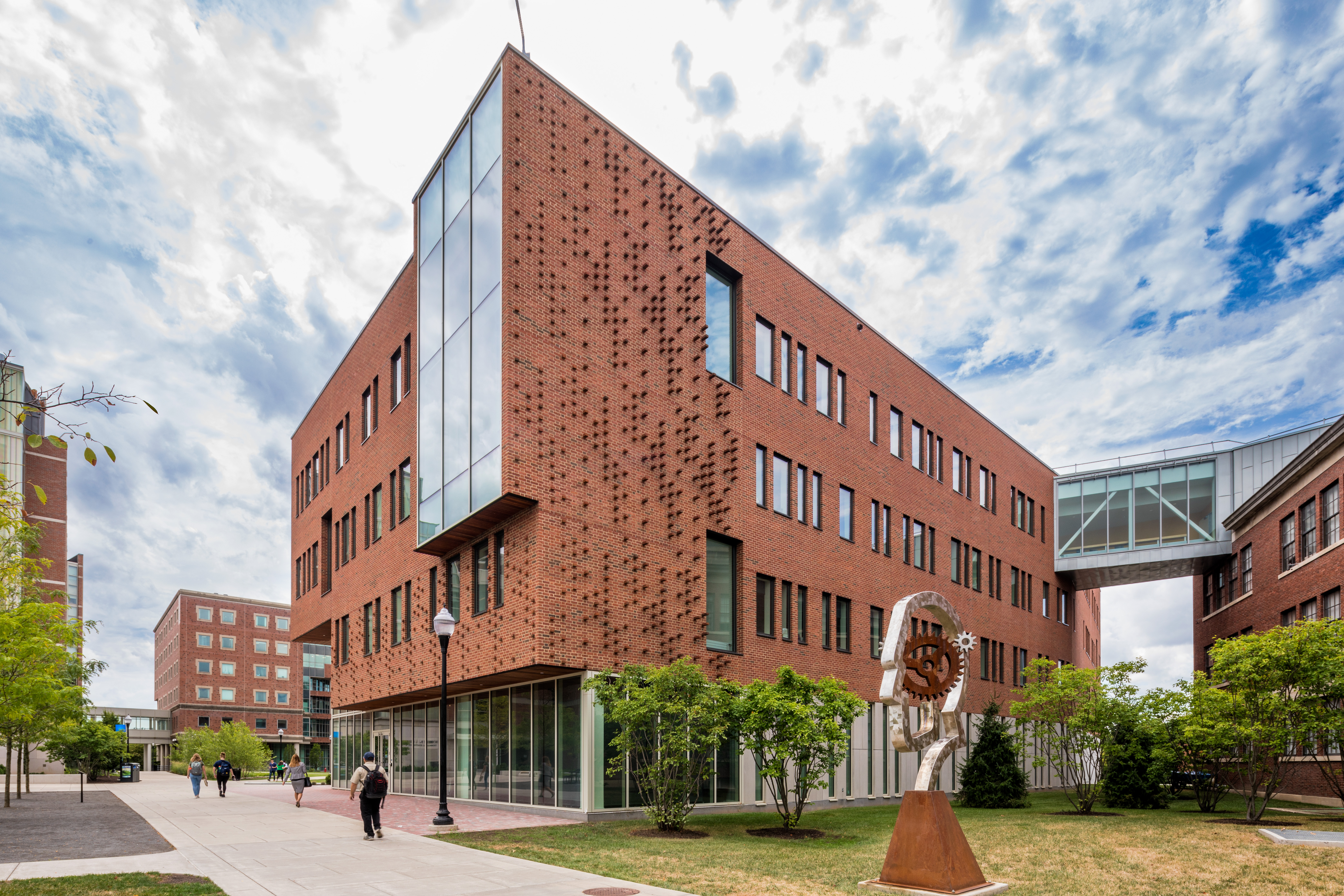
Glen-Gery, Wegmans Hall, University of Rochester, New York 2019

== House of brands ==
Brickworks Building Products is structured as a house of brands operating across Australia and North America.

From a two-state Australian building products manufacturer, Brickworks has evolved into one of the largest building products companies in Australia and North America.

Australia

- Austral Bricks
- Austral Masonry
- Bristile Roofing
- Southern Cross Cement
- Bowral Bricks
- Daniel Robertson
- Nubrik
- Terracade
- GB Masonry
- UrbanStone
- Capital Battens

North America

- Glen-Gery
- Sioux City Brick
- Lawrenceville Brick
- Cushwa Brick

Exclusive Distributor

- La Escandella
- San Selmo
- La Paloma
- Ceramiche Keope
