= Smokers v Non-Smokers =

First-class cricket matches

- Format: First-class cricket
- Matches: 2
- First match: 15–16 September 1884
- Last match: 17–21 March 1887

Two first-class cricket matches billed as "Smokers v Non-Smokers" were played during the 1880s. Featuring players from Australia and England, each match occurred during a tour of one of those countries by the other's national team. The first match was won by the Non-Smokers, while in the second, which was drawn, the Non-Smokers scored a then-record 803 runs in the first innings.

The first match was played at the end of the Australian tour of England in 1884, and was held at Lord's in aid of the Cricketers' Fund Friendly Society. Eight of the tourists took part; four on each side. The Non-Smokers batted first, and then forced their opponents to follow on, aided by a strong batting performance from George Bonnor. The Smokers, batting twice, only finished thirteen runs ahead, a total which was chased down without the need for the scheduled third day of the contest.

In the second match, held in Australia two and a half years later, the contest once again featured a combination of Australian and English players. Aided by an Arthur Shrewsbury double century (236), the Non-Smokers set a new record for the highest innings in first-class cricket, accumulating 803 runs. As in the original match, the Smokers had to follow on, and when the match finished as a draw they were still over 300 runs behind.

== First match, 1884 ==
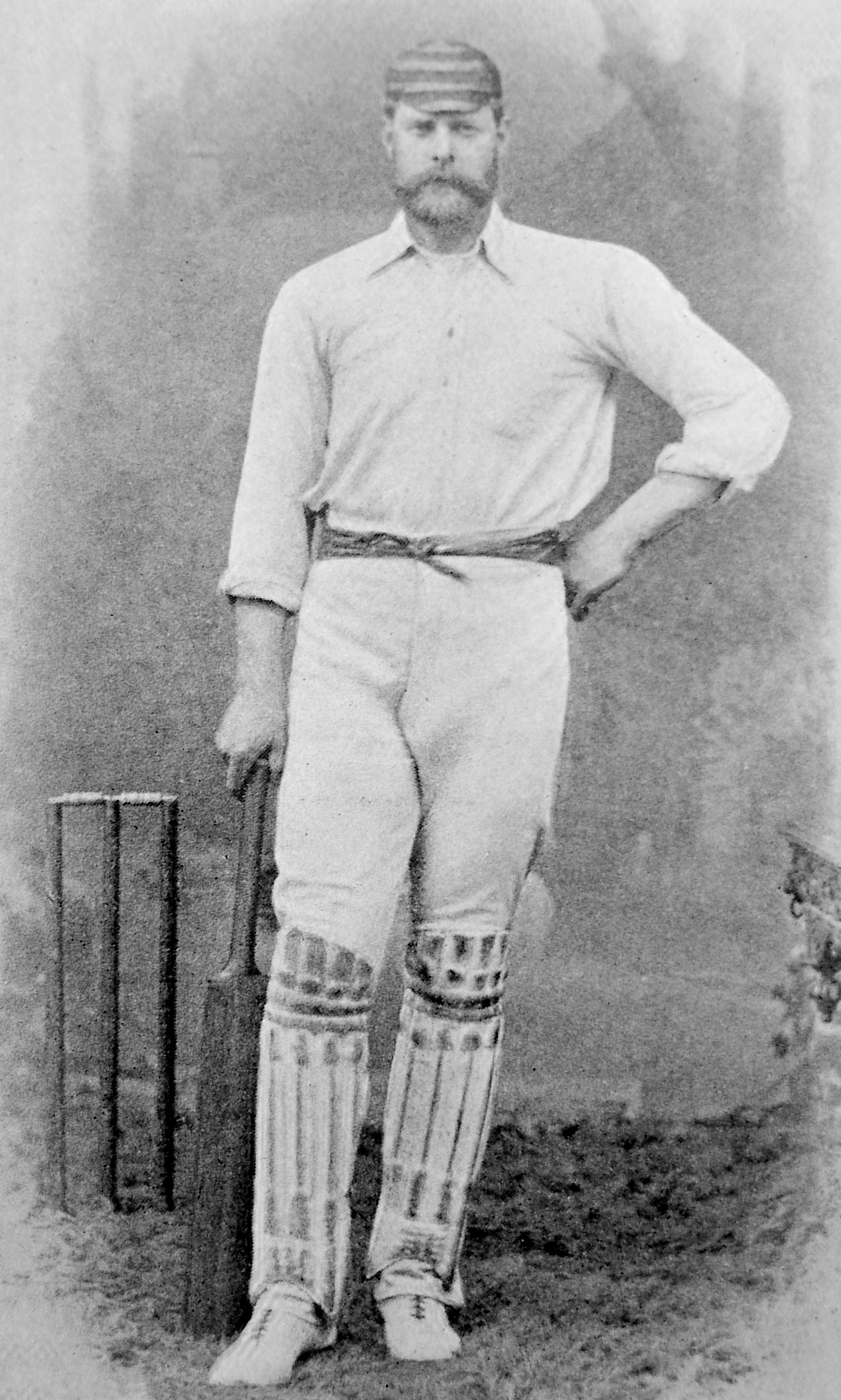
The Australian batsman George Bonnor top-scored in the 1884 contest with 124 runs in the first innings for the Non-Smokers.

The Australia national cricket team toured England in 1884, playing an itinerary of 32 matches, including three designated as Tests. At the end of the tour, an additional fixture was arranged by V. E. Walker, who went on to become president of both the Marylebone Cricket Club (MCC) and Middlesex County Cricket Club. The match, which was described in The South Australian Advertiser as being "novel and interesting", combined Australian and English players into two teams; those who smoked and those who did not. The match was played to raise money for the Cricketers' Fund Friendly Society, in which it was considered very successful, raising in excess of £561. Walker also wanted the British public to have an opportunity to see members of the Australian touring party play against each other, to which end Alick Bannerman, George Bonnor, Billy Murdoch and Tup Scott represented the Non-Smokers, while George Giffen, Percy McDonnell, Eugene Palmer and Frederick Spofforth played for the Smokers. The reporter from The South Australian Advertiser judged that the Smokers had the stronger batsmen, while the Non-Smokers had the better bowlers.

Lord Harris captained the Smokers, and called the toss wrong; the captain of the Non-Smokers, W. G. Grace, opted for his side to bat first. The Smokers team amused the crowd by walking out to field smoking cigarettes. The first three wickets fell for the addition of 38 runs; Grace scored 10, Murdoch got 4 and Bannerman had 22, bringing together Bonnor and Dick Barlow. The pair added 152 runs together, with the Lancashire professional Barlow playing a supporting role to the Australian Bonnor. The latter scored 124 runs, and according to Wisden Cricketers' Almanack, he batted against Spofforth "with such astonishing freedom." Bonnor hit a six and 16 fours during his innings, which was the only score over 50 in the match. Barlow continued to bat carefully, but was eventually dismissed for 39 by the left-arm spinner Edmund Peate, who claimed six of the final seven wickets to finish with figures of six for 30, and end the Non-Smokers innings on 250.

The Smokers began their innings late on the first day. By that stage, the pitch had deteriorated and light was poor, making batting more difficult. By the end of the day's play forty minutes later, they had lost four wickets and only scored 25 runs. They fared better the following morning, but only three batsmen reached double figures—Billy Gunn, 18, Monty Bowden, 29, and Charles Clarke, 20 not out—as they were bowled out for 111 just before the lunch break. W. G. Grace was the pick of the bowlers, taking five wickets for 29 runs. A first-innings deficit of 139 runs meant that the Smokers were forced to follow on.

Beginning their second innings after lunch, there was a little improvement for the Smokers, though six of the team were dismissed without reaching double figures. Gunn top-scored for his side, remaining 43 not out at the end of the innings, while Charles Thornton and George Giffen both scored quickly, making 27 and 15 respectively. Despite these scores, the Smokers only reached 152, leaving the Non-Smokers needing 14 runs to win the match. Grace collected three further wickets in this second innings, but he was bettered by Barlow, who took five for 24. Although it was past half past five in the evening with poor light by this time, the decision was made that the match should not continue into the following day, and so the Non-Smokers came out to bat and hit the runs they required, reaching the total shortly after six o'clock. The match was played at Lord's in good weather on both days, and was well attended on the first day, with between six and seven thousand spectators at the ground.

15 September 1884
scorecard

Non-Smokers	v	Smokers
250 (127.1 overs); George Bonnor 124; Edmund Peate 6/30 (23 overs)		111 (96 overs); Monty Bowden 29; W. G. Grace 5/29 (34 overs)
15/1 (4.3 overs); Stanley Christopherson 8 Edmund Peate 1/10 (1 over)		152 (86.3 overs); Billy Gunn 43*; Dick Barlow 5/24 (27.3 overs)

Non-Smokers won by 9 wickets
Lord's, London
Umpires: Thomas Hearne and Edgar Willsher

- Non-Smokers won the toss and chose to bat

== Second match, 1887 ==
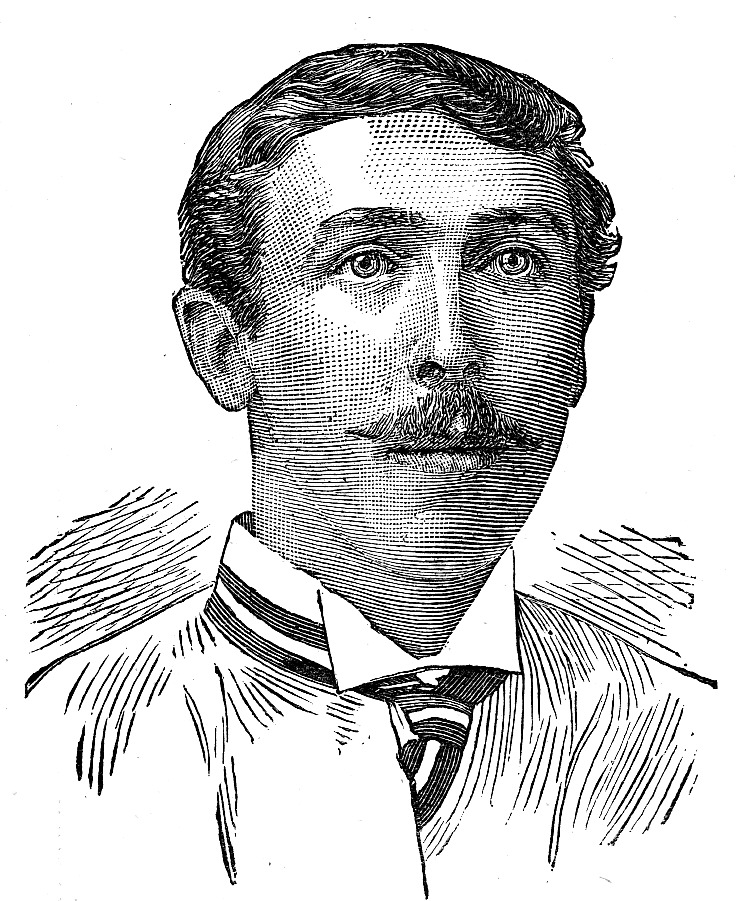
Billy Gunn, who had played for the Smokers in 1884, appeared for the Non-Smokers in 1887.

Two and a half years later, another first-class contest with the same title was held at East Melbourne Cricket Ground in Australia. The game was played as the penultimate match of the English tour of Australia in 1886–87, led by Alfred Shaw. Once again the two teams contained a mix of Australian and English players, including three who had taken part in the previous match; Barlow and Palmer each appeared for the same team as previously, but Gunn, who had played for the Smokers in 1884, switched teams and was on the side of the Non-Smokers in 1887. The touring side had been due to face a "Combined Australia" team, but as such a team would be missing those players from New South Wales, it was decided to split the teams as in 1884. The match was sponsored by four companies, with prizes of 500 cigars each for the best batsman and bowler for the Smokers, 250 cigars for the best aggregate batting score for the Smokers, another 250 cigars for the best individual score from either side, and 200 cigars for the best bowling for the Non-Smokers.

The match began in similar fashion to the earlier contest; the Non-Smokers won the toss, and their captain Arthur Shrewsbury chose to bat first. The Smokers, led by the Australian Harry Boyle, walked onto the pitch smoking cigars. Despite the strong bowling attack boasted by the Smokers, which included Johnny Briggs and George Lohmann, the Non-Smokers took advantage of a good batting wicket and accrued 196 runs before the first wicket fell, that of William Bruce for 131. Billy Bates was dismissed shortly thereafter for four, bringing in Billy Gunn. Shrewsbury and Gunn batted together for the rest of the day, and the following morning, building a partnership of 310 runs; Shrewsbury was eventually caught off the bowling of Briggs for 236, while Gunn was bowled by Boyle for 150. Fifties from Dick Houston, Harry Musgrove and Jack Worrall in the middle-order boosted the score to 803, a new record for the highest innings total in first-class cricket. The previous record, 775 runs, had also been set in Australia, by New South Wales. The score fell some way short of the highest innings score in any cricket, which was believed to have been the 920 scored by Orleans Club against Rickling Green in 1882. The score has since been surpassed over twenty times.

The Smokers began their response on the third morning of the match, and after losing Maurice Read for 30, Eugene Palmer and Briggs put together a partnership of 160, but both were dismissed before the close of play that day, Palmer for 113 and Briggs for 86. Nevertheless, with the score at 302 for three, it was considered likely that the match would end in a draw. The following morning, wickets fell rapidly; Bates finished the innings with figures of six for 73, and the Smokers, who were all out for 356, were asked to follow on. Briggs recorded a second fifty in the match, but no other player made a significant impact, and the game pestered towards the expected draw. The last ball of the match resulted in a situation described by Gerald Brodribb as "most unusual". William Scotton faced the final delivery of the contest. Eager to claim the ball as a souvenir of the high-scoring match, he defended the delivery and picked the ball up. The fielders—who also wanted the souvenir—appealed, and Scotton was ruled out, having handled the ball. The match was drawn, with the Smokers still trailing by 312 runs.

17 March 1887
scorecard

Non-Smokers	v	Smokers
803 (302.1 overs); Arthur Shrewsbury 236; Johnny Briggs 4/141 (55.1 overs)		356 (150.3 overs); Eugene Palmer 113; Billy Bates 6/73 (49 overs)
		135/5 (71 overs); Johnny Briggs 54; Billy Gunn 1/1 (6 overs)

Match drawn
East Melbourne Cricket Ground, Melbourne
Umpires: James Phillips and Reginald Wood

- Non-Smokers won the toss and chose to bat
