= English cricket team in Australia and New Zealand in 1881–82 =

International cricket tour

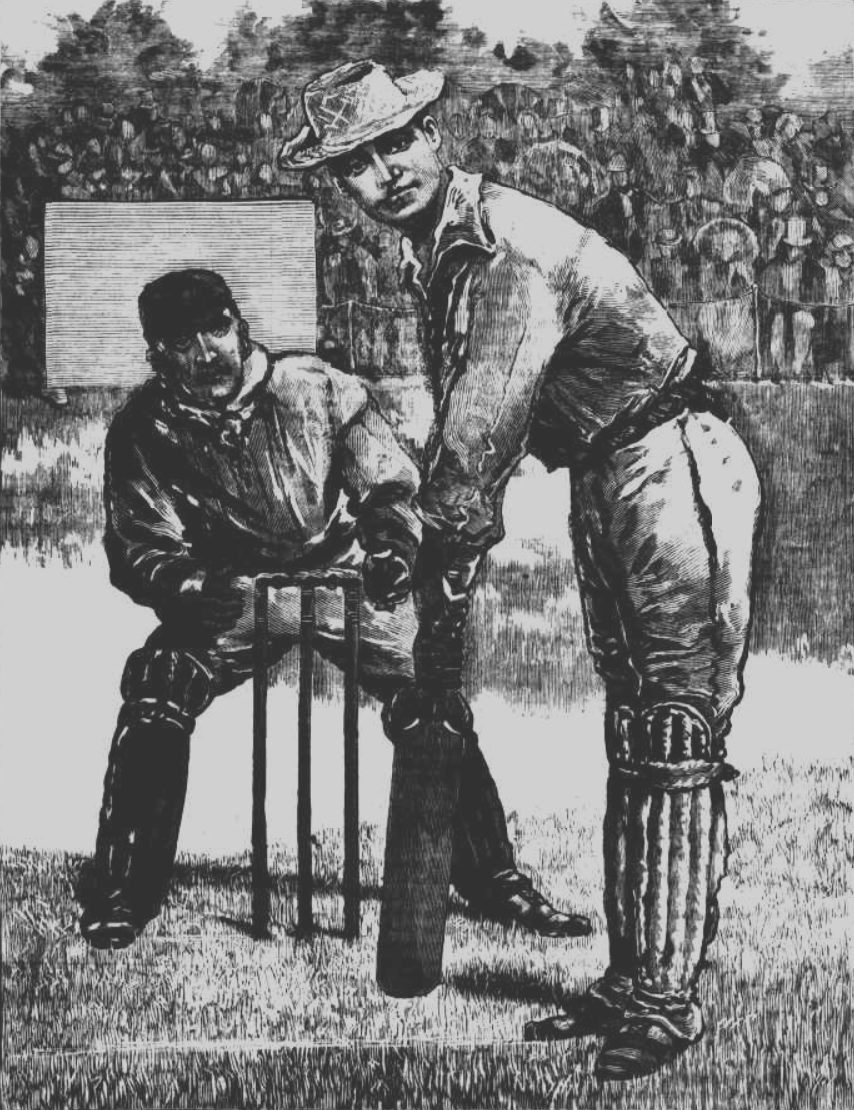
Sketch of George Giffen batting in the first Test

An England cricket team toured Australia, New Zealand and the United States between September 1881 and March 1882. Their first match in Australia began on 23 November, and the team went on to New Zealand for seven matches before returning to Australia in February and playing the last three Tests, ending on 18 March. In Australia, the tour itinerary consisted of seven first-class matches, including a four-match Test series against Australia.

The Test series was won 2–0 by Australia with two matches drawn. The Ashes, which began later in 1882, were not at stake. None of the matches in either New Zealand or the United States have been ascribed first-class status. Besides the four Tests, two matches against Victoria and one match against New South Wales have been recognised as first-class.

The tour became the subject of a potential betting scandal after certain English players were implicated in rumours about receiving money to participate in match-fixing. The match in question was against Victoria at the Melbourne Cricket Ground, played 16–20 December 1881. In the end, nothing could be proven and the matter was eventually dropped, but not until after a degree of public discussion in English cricket.

== History ==
The tour was privately organised by the professional players James Lillywhite, junior, Alfred Shaw and Arthur Shrewsbury. The team left England in September 1881 and sailed across the Atlantic first to play five matches in the United States during October. In all matches other than Tests, the team was called A. Shaw's XI.

Their first match in Australia began on 23 November. After completing the first Test at the turn of the year, the team went to New Zealand for seven matches before returning to Australia in February and playing the last three Tests. The tour ended on 18 March. Besides the four Tests, two matches against Victoria and one match against New South Wales have been recognised as first-class.

== Test series ==
Australia and England played four Tests between 31 December 1881 and 14 March 1882. Australia won the series 2–0 with two matches drawn:

- 1st Test at Melbourne Cricket Ground – match drawn
- 2nd Test at Association Ground, Sydney – Australia won by 5 wickets
- 3rd Test at Association Ground, Sydney – Australia won by 6 wickets
- 4th Test at Melbourne Cricket Ground – match drawn

Throughout the series, overs consisted of four deliveries each.

=== 1st Test ===
31 December 1881
– 4 January 1882
(Timeless Test)
Scorecard

England	v	Australia
294 (170.2 overs); George Ulyett 87; William Cooper 3/80 (32.2 overs)		320 (237 overs); Tom Horan 124; George Ulyett 2/41 (20 overs)
308 (229.3 overs); John Selby 70; William Cooper 6/120 (61 overs)		3/127 (55 overs); Percy McDonnell 33*; Billy Bates 2/43 (13 overs)

Match drawn by agreement
Melbourne Cricket Ground, Melbourne
Umpires: James Lillywhite (Eng) and John Swift (Aus)

- England won the toss and elected to bat.
- William Cooper (Aus), Edwin Evans (Aus), George Giffen (Aus), Hugh Massie (Aus), Dick Barlow (Eng), Billy Bates (Eng), Ted Peate (Eng), Dick Pilling (Eng), William Scotton (Eng) and Arthur Shrewsbury (Eng) made their Test debut.
- Billy Midwinter made his debut for England having played for Australia in the first two Test matches.
- This was the first Test match to end in a draw and the first Test match to have umpires from two different countries.

Whilst this match was designated as a timeless Test, the ship that was due to take the tourists to New Zealand was set to depart on the morning of 4 January. The authorities pushed back the ship's departure time to 3:45 pm in the hope that the match would yield a result. However, it was all in vain as after 55 overs in the fourth innings Australia were still 156 runs short of their target with three wickets down. The result was Test cricket's first ever draw.

=== 2nd Test ===
17–21 February 1882
(Timeless Test)
Scorecard

England	v	Australia
133 (115 overs); Dick Barlow 31; Joey Palmer 7/68 (58 overs)		197 (194.2 overs); Hugh Massie 49; Billy Bates 4/52 (72 overs)
232 (153.1 overs); George Ulyett 67; Tom Garrett 4/62 (36 overs)		5/169 (107.1 overs); Billy Murdoch 49; George Ulyett 2/48 (15 overs)

Australia won by 5 wickets
Association Ground, Sydney
Umpires: James Lillywhite (Eng) and John Swift (Aus)

- England won the toss and elected to bat.
- Rain on day 2 at 5:30 pm suspended play for the rest of the day.
- George Coulthard (Aus) and Sammy Jones (Aus) made their Test debut.
- This was the first Test match to be played in Sydney. The Association Ground later became the Sydney Cricket Ground.

=== 3rd Test ===
3–7 March 1882
(Timeless Test)
Scorecard

England	v	Australia
188 (140.2 overs); Arthur Shrewsbury 82; Joey Palmer 5/46 (45.2 overs)		262 (172 overs); Percy McDonnell 147; Ted Peate 5/43 (45 overs)
134 (80.1 overs); Arthur Shrewsbury 47; Tom Garrett 6/78 (36.1 overs)		4/64 (49.3 overs); Tom Horan 16*; Ted Peate 3/15 (25 overs)

Australia won by 6 wickets
Association Ground, Sydney
Umpires: James Lillywhite (Eng) and John Swift (Aus)

- England won the toss and elected to bat.
- Rain on day 2 at 1:15 pm briefly suspended play and later on day 2 shortly after 3 pm rain suspended play for the rest of the day.
- This was the first Test match where no debutants played.

=== 4th Test ===
10–14 March 1882
(Timeless Test)
Scorecard

England	v	Australia
309 (159.2 overs); George Ulyett 149; Tom Garrett 5/80 (54.2 overs)		300 (163.1 overs); Billy Murdoch 85; Billy Midwinter 4/81 (41 overs)
2/234 (97.3 overs); George Ulyett 64; Harry Boyle 1/38 (25 overs)

Match drawn by agreement
Melbourne Cricket Ground, Melbourne
Umpires: George Coulthard (Aus) and James Lillywhite (Eng)

- England won the toss and elected to bat.
- No play was possible on day 4 due to rain. This was the first time an entire day's play of Test cricket was lost to rain.
- This was the second ever drawn Test match and the last in Australia until the third Test of the 1946–47 Ashes series.
- George Ulyett's 149 in the first innings was the first Test century for England in Australia and it was the highest individual innings score for England on the first day of a Test in Australia until Bob Barber scored 185 in the third Test of the 1965–66 Ashes series.

Whilst this match was designated as a timeless Test, the tourists were due to depart Melbourne on the evening on 14 March in order to play a two-day match in Dunolly the following day. With rain washing out the entire fourth day's play, this resulted in Test cricket's second ever draw and Australia taking out the series 2–0.

== Controversy ==
A potential scandal arose following the match against Victoria in December when it was alleged that certain English players had agreed to take part in a betting scam and attempt to throw the match. Team captain Alfred Shaw suspected there was a conspiracy but his team won by 18 runs and, as he later said: "Whatever the scheme actually was, it failed".

The issue became the opening topic in the inaugural issue of Cricket: A Weekly Record of the Game, published on 10 May 1882. The editor's first words were: "The new cricket season will probably begin with a scandal". He went on to bemoan his perception that, in Australia, "large sums are betted on matches" but admitted the same was true of England until about fifty years previously. After paying his respects to "the class of gentlemen of leisure" who run cricket in England, he concluded by saying that "it is worth no man's while to buy or sell a match; and we may trust that the colonial vice (sic) will never take firm root at Lord's or at the Oval". No details of the expected scandal were given at that time. The affair dragged on for a few weeks and Lord Harris, first among the class of gentlemen of leisure, became involved by writing a letter to The Times in which he demanded "public refutation" of the rumours.

According to Shaw, he was told that Billy Midwinter had been approached by George Ulyett and John Selby, who wanted Midwinter to take part in the scam. Victoria were in a strong position but the weather was against them and there was the strong probability that they would need to bat on a "sticky wicket" in their final innings. That is what happened and Shaw's XI surprisingly won by 18 runs after being obliged to follow on. Even so, Shaw was aware that "most extravagant odds" were being offered on Victoria to win and, although he was sceptical about the allegation, he refused to let either Midwinter or Ulyett bowl. He relied mainly on Ted Peate, who was the match-winner with a return of 6/30, and used four other bowlers in support: himself, Billy Bates, Tom Emmett and Dick Barlow.

The tour had ended and the players were sailing home when the rumours became public. There were later reports of two fights on ship-board, both apparently involving Selby. In one of these, Selby allegedly assaulted Midwinter because he had refused to participate in the scam, but Midwinter got the better of him and Ulyett intervened. It is not clear if Ulyett attacked Midwinter or if he stopped the fight. The second fight allegedly involved William Scotton who had taken exception to something, and this may also have involved Selby. However, Scotton had known marital issues and his fight may well have been about that.

In the end, after various denials had been publicly stated as demanded by Harris, nothing could be proved and the whole matter was dropped.
