= English cricket team in Australia in 1884–85 =

International cricket tour

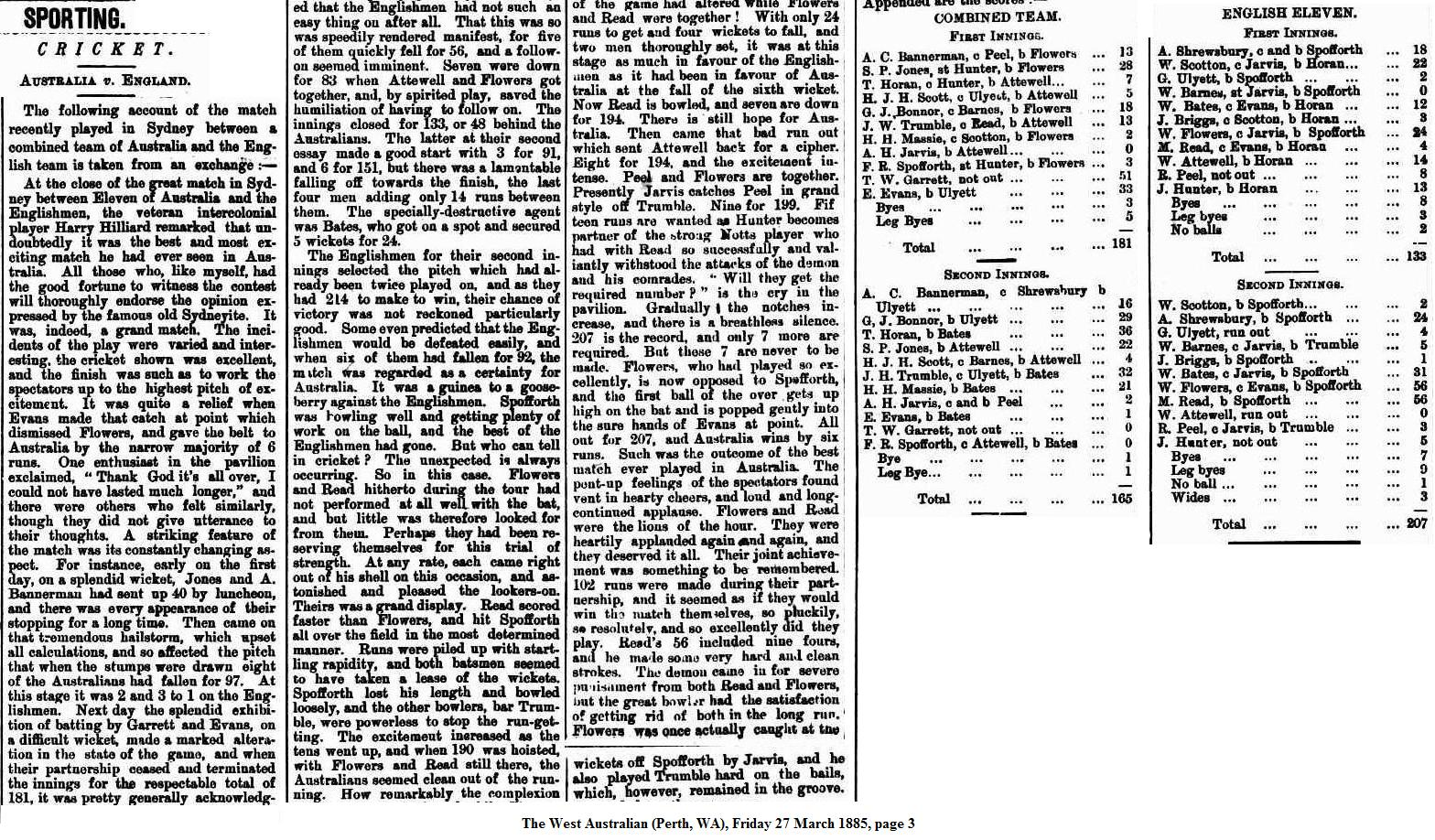
The close 6 run victory by Australia in the 3rd test was described by Harry Hilliard as the most exciting match ever played in Australia.

The England cricket team in Australia in 1884–85 was generally known as Alfred Shaw's XI after its main organiser. The team played 8 first-class matches, including the five matches in the Test series, winning 6 and losing 2.

== Squads ==
The party comprised 13 players, all of them professionals: Arthur Shrewsbury, Billy Barnes, William Attewell, William Scotton, Wilfred Flowers and Alfred Shaw (all Nottinghamshire); Billy Bates, Joe Hunter, Bobby Peel and George Ulyett (all Yorkshire); Johnny Briggs (Lancashire); Maurice Read (Surrey); and James Lillywhite (Sussex).

Australia's team for the second Test showed eleven changes as a result of the 1884 touring team (who had contested the 1st Test) demanding fifty per cent of the gate money for this match. This ended Jack Blackham's run as a player in each of Australia's first 17 Test matches.

England	Australia
Arthur Shrewsbury(c); Billy Barnes; William Attewell; William Scotton; Wilfred Flowers; Alfred Shaw; Billy Bates; Joe Hunter (wk); Bobby Peel; George Ulyett; Johnny Briggs; Maurice Read; James Lillywhite	William Murdoch(c); Alec Bannerman; Percy McDonnell; Henry Scott; Jack Blackham (wk); George Giffen; George Bonnor; George Palmer; Harry Boyle; George Alexander; William Cooper; Sammy Jones; Sam Morris; Tom Horan (c); Billy Trumble; Affie Jarvis (wk); Roland Pope; Percy Marr; Harry Musgrove; Jack Worrall; William Bruce; William Robertson; Hugh Massie (c); Edwin Evans; Frank Walters

== Matches ==
=== First Test ===
12–16 December 1884
(Timeless Test)
Scorecard

Australia	v	England
243 (149.1 overs); Percy McDonnell 124; Billy Bates 5/31 (24.1 overs)		369 (243.2 overs); Billy Barnes 134; Eugene Palmer 5/81 (73 overs)
191 (116.1 overs); Percy McDonnell 83; Bobby Peel 5/51 (40.1 overs)		67/2 (31 overs); Billy Barnes 28; Harry Boyle 1/21 (9 overs)

England won by 8 wickets
Adelaide Oval, Adelaide
Umpires: Tom Cole (Aus) and Isaac Fisher (Aus)

- Australia won the toss and elected to bat
- 14 December was taken as a rest day
- 4 balls per over

=== Second Test ===
1–5 January 1885
(Timeless Test)
Scorecard

England	v	Australia
401 (216.2 overs); Johnny Briggs 121; Sammy Jones 4/47 (25.2 overs)		279 (274.1 overs); Affie Jarvis 82; Billy Barnes 3/50 (50 overs)
7/0 (1.1 overs); William Scotton 7* Alfred Marr 0/3 (1 over)		126 (114.3 overs) (f/o); William Bruce 45; Billy Barnes 6/31 (38.3 overs)

England won by 10 wickets
Melbourne Cricket Ground, Melbourne
Umpires: Edward Elliott (Aus) and James Lillywhite (Eng)

- England won the toss and elected to bat
- 4 January was taken as a rest day
- 4 balls per over

=== Third Test ===
20–24 February 1885
(Timeless Test)
Scorecard

Australia	v	England
181 (167.2 overs); Tom Garrett 51; Wilfred Flowers 5/46 (46 overs)		133 (95.1 overs); Wilfred Flowers 24; Tom Horan 6/40 (37.1 overs)
165 (157 overs); Tom Horan 36; Billy Bates 5/24 (20 overs)		207 (111.1 overs); Wilfred Flowers, Maurice Read 56; Fred Spofforth 6/90 (48.1 overs)

Australia won by 6 runs
Sydney Cricket Ground, Sydney
Umpires: Edward Elliott (Aus) and John Payne (Aus)

- Australia won the toss and elected to bat
- 22 February was taken as a rest day
- 4 balls per over

=== Fourth Test ===
14–17 March 1885
(Timeless Test)
Scorecard

England	v	Australia
269 (126 overs); Billy Bates 64; George Giffen 7/117 (52 overs)		309 (169.3 overs); George Bonnor 128; Billy Barnes 4/61 (35.3 overs)
77 (39.1 overs); Billy Barnes 20; Fred Spofforth 5/30 (20 overs)		38/2 (24.3 overs); Sammy Jones 15*; Billy Barnes 1/15 (9 overs)

Australia won by 8 wickets
Sydney Cricket Ground, Sydney
Umpires: Edward Elliott (Aus) and Patrick McShane (Aus)

- England won the toss and elected to bat
- 15 March was taken as a rest day
- 4 balls per over
- The match was played on two different pitches, with each team having the choice of which pitch to use for their second innings.

=== Fifth Test ===
21–25 March 1885
(Timeless Test)
Scorecard

Australia	v	England
163 (106 overs); Fred Spofforth 50; George Ulyett 4/52 (23 overs)		386 (221.3 overs); Arthur Shrewsbury 105*; John Trumble 3/29 (28 overs)
125 (102.1 overs); William Bruce 35; William Attewell 3/24 (36.1 overs)

England won by an innings and 98 runs
Melbourne Cricket Ground, Melbourne
Umpires: George Hodges and James Philips (Aus)

- Australia won the toss and elected to bat
- 22 March was taken as a rest day
- 4 balls per over

== Bibliography ==
- Chris Harte, A History of Australian Cricket, Andre Deutsch, 1993
- Wisden Cricketers' Almanack 1886
