= Australian cricket team in England in 1882 =

International cricket tour

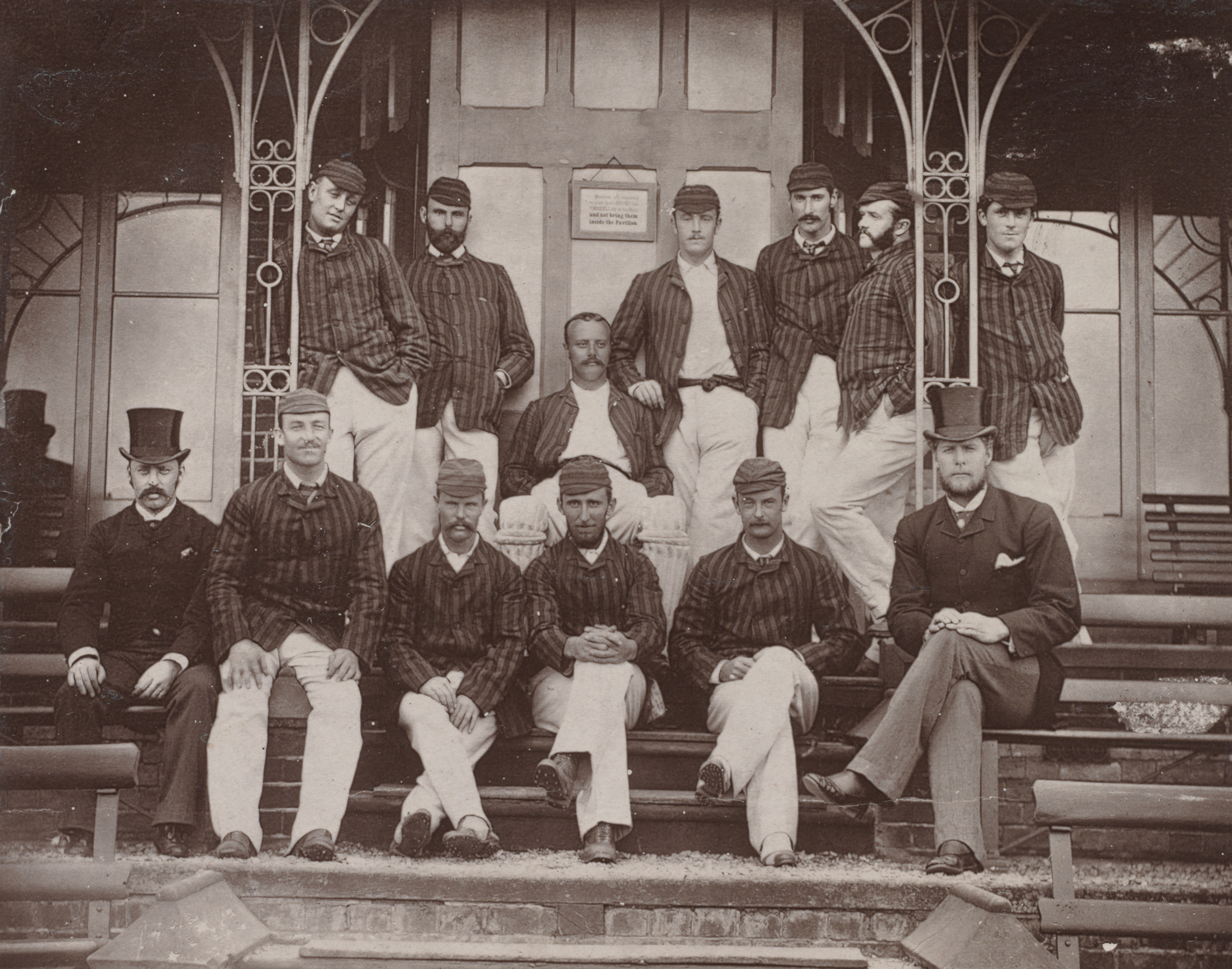
The 1882 Australian cricket team. Back row (l-r): Joey Palmer, Harry Boyle, Percy McDonnell, Fred Spofforth, Tom Horan, Sammy Jones. Centre: Billy Murdoch. Front row (l-r): Mr Beal (manager), George Giffen, Alick Bannerman, Tom Garrett, Hugh Massie, George Bonnor. Missing: Jack Blackham.

The Australia national cricket team toured England in 1882. The team is officially termed the Third Australians, following two previous tours in the 1878 and 1880 seasons. At the time, there was no Test cricket and so, as in 1880, the single match between England and Australia was rated first-class only. (Note: First-class cricket acquired official status in May 1895 but it is generally reckoned to have begun, albeit unofficially, in 1864 when overarm bowling was legalised. Test cricket was also granted official status in 1895, and 43 international matches played between March 1877 and December 1894 were retrospectively recognised as Tests.) It has since been retrospectively recognised as a Test match. It also became historically famous as the match which created The Ashes.

== Australian squad ==
- Billy Murdoch (captain)
- Alick Bannerman
- Jack Blackham (wicket-keeper)
- George Bonnor
- Harry Boyle
- Tom Garrett
- George Giffen
- Tom Horan
- Sammy Jones
- Hugh Massie
- Percy McDonnell
- Joey Palmer
- Fred Spofforth

== England Test selections ==
- A. N. Hornby (captain)
- Alfred Lyttelton (wicket-keeper)
- Dick Barlow
- Billy Barnes
- W. G. Grace
- A. P. Lucas
- Ted Peate
- Maurice Read
- George Ulyett
- A. G. Steel
- Charles Studd

== Test match ==
28–29 August 1882
Scorecard

Australia	v	England
63 (80 overs); Jack Blackham 17 (54); Dick Barlow 5/19 (31 overs)		101 (71.3 overs); George Ulyett 26 (59); Fred Spofforth 7/46 (36.3 overs)
122 (63 overs); Hugh Massie 55 (60); Ted Peate 4/40 (21 overs)		77 (55 overs); W. G. Grace 32 (54); Fred Spofforth 7/44 (28 overs)

Australia won by 7 runs
Kennington Oval, London
Umpires: Luke Greenwood and Bob Thoms
(both England)

- Australia won the toss and elected to bat.
- Maurice Read and Charles Studd (Eng) made their Test debuts.

=== First day ===
Murdoch won the toss for Australia and chose to bat first. The decision proved a poor one though, as Australia were dismissed for 63 in 80 overs, taking just over two hours. The captain himself tried to offer resistance with a defensive 13, and the experienced Blackham top-scored with 17, but the only other batsman to reach double figures was Garrett with 10. Barlow and Peate took nine of the ten wickets between them, having received more assistance from the pitch than had been anticipated.

Barlow and Grace opened for England but Grace was soon beaten by the pace of Spofforth and bowled for 4. A steady succession of wickets followed with only Ulyett (26 off 59 balls) and Read (19 off 54 balls) providing any real resistance. Spofforth collected 7 for 46 off 36.3 overs, including 18 maidens. Four of his seven dismissals were clean bowled. Despite Spofforth's excellent bowling, England had established a first-innings lead of 38, being all out for 101. Stumps were called at the end of England's first innings.

=== Second day ===
Australia began their second innings. Openers Bannerman and Massie fared much better than in the first innings, putting on 66 for the first wicket — more than the whole team's total in the first innings. The loss of Bannerman triggered a mini-collapse with Australia losing 4 for 13 over the next few overs before Murdoch added a much-needed 29, but the last four wickets then fell for eight runs. Massie was top scorer with 55, and Australia were all out for 122 in 63 overs, an overall lead of 84.

Some of the Australians were demoralised by their second-innings collapse but fast bowler Spofforth, enraged by some gamesmanship on the part of Grace, was determined to win. "This thing can be done", he is said to have declared. England had reached 15/0 before Spofforth made the first breakthrough, bowling Hornby for 9. He removed Barlow next ball, also clean bowled but Ulyett was able to prevent him achieving a hat-trick. Grace and Ulyett added of 36 for the third wicket until Spofforth had Ulyett caught behind by Blackham for 11. Grace fell two runs later, caught by Bannerman off Boyle for 32. England were then 53 for 4 but, with six wickets in hand and only 31 runs needed, they were still expected to win.

England had reached 66 for 4 when Spofforth bowled a dramatic over. Lyttelton, having made a slow 12 from 55 deliveries, was bowled off the first ball and his middle stump was uprooted. Off the fourth ball, Spofforth caught and bowled Steel for a duck, and then bowled Read for another duck. The over was a three-wicket maiden which left England on 66 for 7. In Spofforth's next over, after he bowled Lucas for 5, England were 75 for 8, needing ten more runs for victory, but with only two wickets remaining. In the next over, Boyle removed Barnes for 2 and then, with the last ball, bowled Peate for 2.

England were all out for 77 off 55 overs in 122 minutes, and Australia had won a sensational match by seven runs. Spofforth's match figures were 14 for 90. Contemporary accounts report that there was palpable tension among the spectators with the crowd steadily increasing throughout the day as news of the match spread. When Peate was out, the spectators were momentarily silent, but then they rushed onto the field to congratulate the Australians.

== Mock obituaries and aftermath ==
England's astonishing collapse had shocked the English public, and the press savaged the players. It was the first time England had been beaten in England. On 31 August, in Cricket: A Weekly Record of the Game, there appeared a now-obscure mock obituary:

SACRED TO THE MEMORY
OF
ENGLAND'S SUPREMACY IN THE
CRICKET-FIELD
WHICH EXPIRED
ON THE 29TH DAY OF AUGUST, AT THE OVAL
----
"ITS END WAS PEATE"
----

Two days later, on 2 September, a second, more celebrated mock obituary, written by Reginald Brooks under the pseudonym "Bloobs", appeared in The Sporting Times. read as follows:

In Affectionate Remembrance
of
ENGLISH CRICKET,
which died at the Oval
on
29 August 1882,
Deeply lamented by a large circle of sorrowing
friends and acquaintances
----
R.I.P.
----
N.B. – The body will be cremated and the
ashes taken to Australia.

Ivo Bligh as captain of the England team which toured Australia in 1882–83, promised to regain "those ashes". He spoke of them again several times over the course of the tour, and the Australian media quickly caught on. The three-match series resulted in a two-one win to England, notwithstanding a fourth match, won by the Australians, whose status remains a matter of ardent dispute.

In the twenty years following Bligh's campaign, the term "The Ashes" largely disappeared from public use. There is no indication that this was the accepted name for the series—at least not in England. The term became popular again in Australia first, when George Giffen, in his memoirs (With Bat and Ball, 1899), used the term as if it were well known.

The true and global revitalisation of interest in the concept dates from 1903, when Pelham Warner took a team to Australia with the promise that he would regain "the ashes". As had been the case on Bligh's tour twenty years before, the Australian media latched fervently onto the term, and, this time, it stuck.

== Bibliography ==
- ACS (1981). A Guide to Important Cricket Matches Played in the British Isles 1709–1863. Nottingham: ACS. OCLC 85045528.
- ACS (1982). A Guide to First-class Cricket Matches Played in the British Isles. Nottingham: ACS. OCLC 10586869.
- Gibson, Alan (1989). The Cricket Captains of England. London: Cassell. ISBN 978-03-04297-79-5.
- Webber, Roy (1951). The Playfair Book of Cricket Records. London: Playfair Books Ltd. OCLC 753176177.
