= Roland Pope =

Australian cricketer and physician (1864–1952)

Rowley Pope
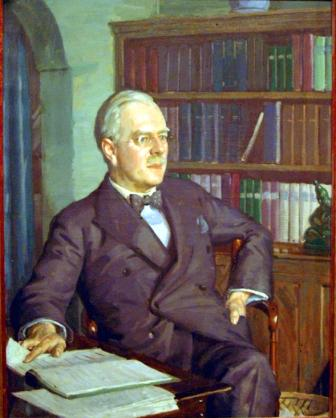

Personal information
- Full name: Roland James Pope
- Born: 18 February 1864; Ashfield, New South Wales
- Died: 27 July 1952 (aged 88); Manly, New South Wales
- Height: 5 ft 6 in (1.68 m)
- Batting: Right-handed
- Bowling: Right-arm slow
- Role: Batsman

International information
- National side: Australia
- Only Test (cap 37): 1 January 1885 v England

Domestic team information
- Years: Team
- 1884/85: New South Wales
- 1889–1891: Marylebone Cricket Club

Career statistics
Competition	Test	First-class
Matches	1	20
Runs scored	3	318
Batting average	1.50	12.23
100s/50s	0/0	0/0
Top score	3	47
Balls bowled	–	10
Wickets	–	0
Bowling average	–	–
5 wickets in innings	–	–
10 wickets in match	–	–
Best bowling	–	–
Catches/stumpings	0/–	13/–
- Source: CricketArchive, 2 July 2012

Roland James "Rowley" Pope (18 February 1864 – 27 July 1952) was an Australian cricketer best known for representing the Australian team in one Test match in 1885, and later also known as an ophthalmologist and philanthropist. From Sydney, New South Wales, he was selected for the Test as the result of a player strike during the English tour of Australia during the 1884–85 season, and made three runs across his two innings. Having studied medicine at the University of Edinburgh, Pope was head of the ophthalmology section of Sydney Hospital for 17 years, and was later involved in the establishment of the library and art gallery of the City of Newcastle. He acted as honorary medical adviser to numerous Australian touring cricket teams, travelling at his own expense.

== Early life and cricket career ==
Pope was born in Ashfield, a suburb of Sydney, New South Wales, on 18 February 1864, and educated at The Hutchins School in Hobart, Tasmania. He then went on to study Arts at the University of Sydney, and his first recorded cricket matches were played for the University's cricket team against Melbourne University in 1879 and 1881.

Partly as a result of scoring 170 not out for a Melbourne I Zingari team against the Richmond Cricket Club, Pope was selected to make his first-class debut for New South Wales against Victoria in late December 1884 at the Melbourne Cricket Ground, and made what was to be his highest first-class score, 47 runs, in New South Wales' first innings. The English cricket team was touring the Australian colonies at the time, and the second Test match of the series was scheduled to be held in Melbourne beginning on 1 January 1885, two days after the conclusion of the New South Wales–Victoria game. A number of leading New South Wales players, including Jack Blackham, Harry Boyle, George Bonnor, and Percy McDonnell objected to the payment arrangements for the tour, and boycotted the first and second Tests in protest at what they perceived at unfair treatment. The Victorian Cricket Association was forced to choose a team comprising nine debutants (including Pope) for the Test, with Tom Horan as captain. In the match, Pope batted at number six in both innings, making a duck in the first innings and three runs in the second innings of what was to be his only Test.

Having moved to Scotland to study at the Medical School of the University of Edinburgh in 1886, Pope played a number of matches for Scottish representative sides against English county sides, as well as playing for the Marylebone Cricket Club on its tour of Great Britain in 1891. Australian representative sides toured England in 1886 and 1890, and Pope played in a number of matches for the teams.

In 1892 Pope was awarded a Doctorate of Medicine from the University of Edinburgh for his thesis, "Modern therapeutics of certain ocular affections" and fellowship of the Royal College of Surgeons of Edinburgh, subsequently returning to Australia. For a period of 17 years, from 1894 to 1911, Pope worked at Sydney Hospital, firstly as honorary ophthalmic assistant, and then as honorary ophthalmic surgeon, later being appointed to the honorary consulting staff after his resignation in May 1911.

== Later life ==
Outside of his profession as a medical practitioner, Pope acted as the medical advisor to a number of Australian touring cricket teams up until the beginning of World War II. A 1934 article in The Daily News noted he had been "away with 12 Australian Test teams". Pope was in England at the same time the Australian team was touring in 1902, and acted as the team's medical advisor and "unofficial baggage handler". At various stages of the tour, a number of Australians were rendered unable to play due to an outbreak of influenza, and Pope was called upon to play in the match against Cambridge University, held at F. P. Fenner's Ground in June 1902. Pope batted at number nine in the batting order in the Australians' only innings, and made two not out in his first first-class match since 1891. Pope was also present on the unofficial 1932 tour of North America organised by Arthur Mailey – it was subsequently noted that his "usually voluminous luggage was 'restricted' to 36 bags". Pope was also involved in the establishment of the Manly Golf Club. He and his brother, Norman Pope, acquired land near Farrell's Paddock, Manly, with an eighteen-hole course being established in May 1908.

In July 1945, Pope presented a collection of "oils, water colours, prints, and rare books" to the City of Newcastle to serve as the "nucleus of an art gallery and library" for Newcastle. For his donation, he was awarded the medal of the Society of Artists by the society's president, Sydney Ure Smith. Pope was also a keen amateur ornithologist, and had acquired a "large collection of specimens from around the world" – his donation to the City of Newcastle had included original editions of works by Mathews and Gould, two early Australian ornithologists. Pope's collection of 137 paintings was held in storage for twelve years until 1957, when the Newcastle City Art Gallery opened. Pope died at his home in Manly on 27 July 1952, and was cremated.

== See also ==
- List of New South Wales representative cricketers
