= International cricket in 1887–88 =

International cricket season

The 1887–88 international cricket season was from September 1887 to March 1888. The season consisted with a one-off Test tour by England in Australia.

== Season overview ==
International tours
| Start date | Home team | Away team | Results [Matches] | | | |
| Start date | Home team | Away team | Test | ODI | FC | LA |
|---|---|---|---|---|---|---|
| 1 January 1888 | Australia | England | 0–1 [1] | — | — | — |

== January ==
=== England in Australia ===
The Ashes Test match series
| No. | Date | Home captain | Away captain | Venue | Result |
|---|---|---|---|---|---|
| Test 27 | 10–15 February | Percy McDonnell | Walter Read | Sydney Cricket Ground, Sydney | England by 126 runs |
