= International cricket in 1886–87 =

International cricket season

The 1886–87 international cricket season was from September 1886 to March 1887. The season consisted with only single Test tour by England in Australia.

== Season overview ==
International tours
Start date	Home team	Away team	Results [Matches]			
Start date	Home team	Away team	Test	ODI	FC	LA
28 January 1887	Australia	England	0–2 [2]	—	—	—

== January ==
=== England in Australia ===
The Ashes Test match series
No.	Date	Home captain	Away captain	Venue	Result
Test 25	28–31 January	Percy McDonnell	Walter Read	Sydney Cricket Ground, Sydney	England by 13 runs
Test 26	25 February–1 March	Percy McDonnell	Arthur Shrewsbury	Sydney Cricket Ground, Sydney	England by 71 runs
