= International cricket in 1881–82 =

International cricket season

The 1881–82 international cricket season was from September 1881 to March 1882.

== Season overview ==
International tours
Start date	Home team	Away team	Results [Matches]	
Start date	Home team	Away team	Test	FC
31 December 1881	Australia	England	2–0 [4]	—

== January ==
=== England in Australia ===
Test match series
No.	Date	Home captain	Away captain	Venue	Result
Test 5	31 December–4 January	Billy Murdoch	Alfred Shaw	Melbourne Cricket Ground, Melbourne	Match drawn
Test 6	17–21 February	Billy Murdoch	Alfred Shaw	Sydney Cricket Ground, Sydney	Australia by 5 wickets
Test 7	3–7 March	Billy Murdoch	Alfred Shaw	Sydney Cricket Ground, Sydney	Australia by 6 wickets
Test 8	10–14 March	Billy Murdoch	Alfred Shaw	Melbourne Cricket Ground, Melbourne	Match drawn
