= International cricket in 1888 =

International cricket season

The 1890 international cricket season was from April 1888 to September 1888. The season consisted of a single international tour, with Australia visiting England for The Ashes series.

== Season overview ==
International tours
Start date	Home team	Away team	Results [Matches]			
Start date	Home team	Away team	Test	ODI	FC	LA
16 July 1890	England	Australia	2–1 [2]	—	—	—

== July ==
=== Australia in England ===
The Ashes Test match series
No.	Date	Home captain	Away captain	Venue	Result
Test 28	16–17 July	Allan Steel	Percy McDonnell	Lord's, London	Australia by 61 runs
Test 29	13–14 August	W. G. Grace	Percy McDonnell	Kennington Oval, London	England by an innings and 137 runs
Test 30	30–31 August	W. G. Grace	Percy McDonnell	Old Trafford Cricket Ground, Manchester	England by an innings and 21 runs
