= Percy Marr =

Australian cricketer

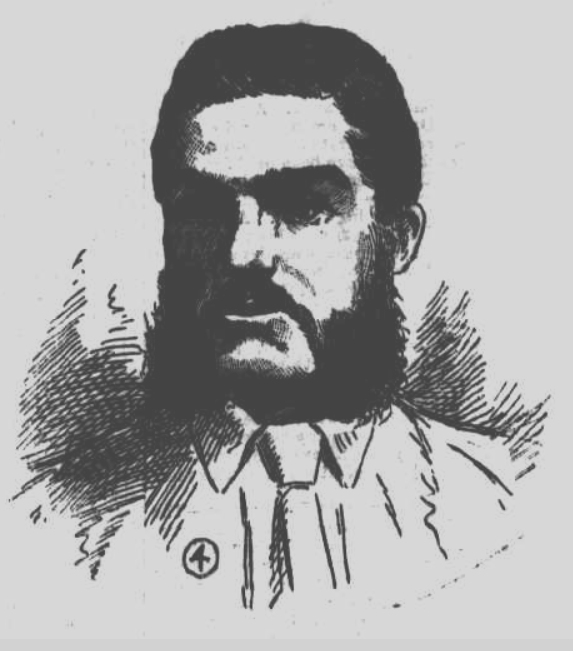

Personal information
- Full name: Alfred Percy Marr
- Born: 28 March 1862; Pyrmont, Sydney New South Wales
- Died: 15 March 1940 (aged 77); Arncliffe, New South Wales
- Batting: Right-handed
- Bowling: Right-arm medium

International information
- National side: Australia
- Only Test (cap 34): 1 January 1885 v England

Career statistics
Competition	Test	First-class
Matches	1	14
Runs scored	5	304
Batting average	2.50	11.25
100s/50s	0/0	0/1
Top score	5	69
Balls bowled	48	1272
Wickets	0	14
Bowling average	–	32.42
5 wickets in innings	–	0
10 wickets in match	–	0
Best bowling	–	3/50
Catches/stumpings	0/–	8/–
- Source: Cricinfo, 12 October 2022

Alfred Percy Marr (28 March 1862 – 15 March 1940) was an Australian cricketer who played in one Test match in 1885.

== Personal life ==
Marr was the youngest son of William (a ship's captain) and Mary Ann Marr (née Sayers).

On 10 December 1887, Percy Marr married Rachel Ann Julian at the Wesleyan Church in Windsor, Sydney.

He worked as a carpenter with the New South Wales Railway Department, spending part of his life stationed at Goulburn, and later on at Newcastle.

Marr died at his home in Arncliffe, Sydney on 15 March 1940.

== Cricket career ==
In April 1884 Marr was a member of the New South Wales Eleven which travelled to Brisbane and unexpectedly lost a non-first-class inter-colonial match to a Queensland Fifteen. He top-scored in both innings, hitting a brilliant 50 in the first, and 16 in the second.

Percy Marr's highest score in first-class matches was made for New South Wales in the inter-colonial match versus Victoria in Melbourne at the end of December 1884. Tom Horan as "Felix" writing in The Australasian commented: "His innings of 69 was almost without a blemish. He played very steadily until fairly set, and then he punished the bowling in a manner that evoked loud applause".

He was then selected to play for Australia against England in the second Test match of the 1884–85 series. After an economical spell of bowling in England's innings conceding just 11 runs off eleven overs, Marr's batting failed to come off in either innings. He was unluckily bowled by Barnes for nought in the first innings, playing the ball hard against his pads from where the ball bounced against the stumps and disturbed the bails, and he scored just five runs in the second.

Later in life, after his state career was over, Marr continued to score runs at minor match level.
