= Digger Robertson =

Australian cricketer (1861–1938)

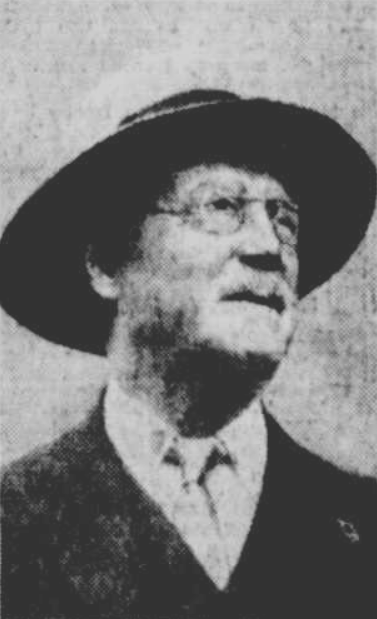

Personal information
- Born: 6 October 1861; Deniliquin, New South Wales, Australia
- Died: 24 June 1938 (aged 76); Brighton, Melbourne, Australia
- Batting: Right-handed
- Bowling: Legbreak

International information
- National side: Australia
- Only Test (cap 38): 1 January 1885 v England

Career statistics
Competition	Test	First-class
Matches	1	7
Runs scored	2	109
Batting average	1.00	13.62
100s/50s	0/0	0/0
Top score	2	33
Balls bowled	44	965
Wickets	0	15
Bowling average	–	31.06
5 wickets in innings	–	1
10 wickets in match	–	0
Best bowling	–	5/46
Catches/stumpings	0/–	3/–
- Source: Cricinfo, 12 October 2022

William "Digger" Roderick Robertson (6 October 1861 – 24 June 1938) was an Australian cricketer who played in one Test match in 1885.

A native of the New South Wales town of Deniliquin, near the Victoria border, Digger Robertson was a right-handed batsman with a leg break bowling style. He made his first-class debut for Victoria against the English touring team in November 1884, taking 3 for 36 and 5 for 46. After the Australian team for the First Test in December refused to play in the Second Test, Robertson was one of eight Test debutants selected. However, he took no wickets, Australia lost, and along with four of the other debutants, he played no further Test cricket.

After an altercation with his East Melbourne captain Harry Boyle, Robertson moved to San Francisco, where he played for three turn-of-the-century California Cricket Association league clubs. In 1898 he captained the Bohemia Cricket Club to victory in the California Cricket Association championship. He scored one of the first centuries in California cricket history and played against the 1896 Australian Test side at the Presidio ground. He returned to Australia in 1899, and played successfully for many years for St Kilda Cricket Club in Melbourne. He died in the Melbourne suburb of Brighton at the age of 76.
