= Harry Musgrove =

Australian cricketer

- Harry Musgrove in 1896

Personal information
- Full name: Henry Alfred Musgrove
- Born: 27 November 1858; Surbiton, Surrey, England
- Died: 2 November 1931 (aged 72); Darlinghurst, New South Wales, Australia
- Batting: Right-handed
- Relatives: George Musgrove (brother)

International information
- National side: Australia
- Only Test (cap 36): 1 January 1885 v England

Domestic team information
- Years: Team
- 1881–82 to 1887–88: Victoria

Career statistics
Competition	Tests	First-class
Matches	1	7
Runs scored	13	99
Batting average	6.50	8.25
100s/50s	0/0	0/1
Top score	9	62
Balls bowled	0	24
Wickets	0	0
Bowling average	–	–
5 wickets in innings	0	0
10 wickets in match	0	0
Best bowling	–	–
Catches/stumpings	0/0	3/0
- Source: Cricinfo

Henry Alfred Musgrove (27 November 1858 – 2 November 1931) was an Australian theatrical manager and cricketer who played in one Test match in 1885.

== Life and career ==
Harry Musgrove was born in England, and his family moved to Australia when he was a small boy. He grew up in Geelong. His father was an accountant, but his mother came from a theatrical background. He and his brothers established a theatrical management firm in Melbourne. They amalgamated with the J. C. Williamson company after a cricket match between the two companies in the 1880s.

Musgrove played with the East Melbourne Cricket Club from 1879 to 1892, scoring 2899 runs at an average of 28, including several centuries. He was an elegant batsman. The journalist and former Test cricketer Tom Horan described one of his innings as "an admirable, fantastic, faultless exhibition of batting. Looking at Musgrove hitting a fiver, it seems the simplest thing in the world to go and do likewise, his manner of making the stroke is so easy, so devoid of anything like exercise of strength."

His theatrical work prevented his playing much first-class cricket. He played a match for Victoria in 1881–82; then, when he was in Ballarat on theatrical business in December 1884, he was selected to play for the local team against the touring English team. He scored 109, and when a few days later most of the Australian Test players withdrew from the Second Test in a dispute with the authorities over pay, he was selected as one of the replacements. He was not successful. He was one of the five Australians for whom this match would be their only Test.

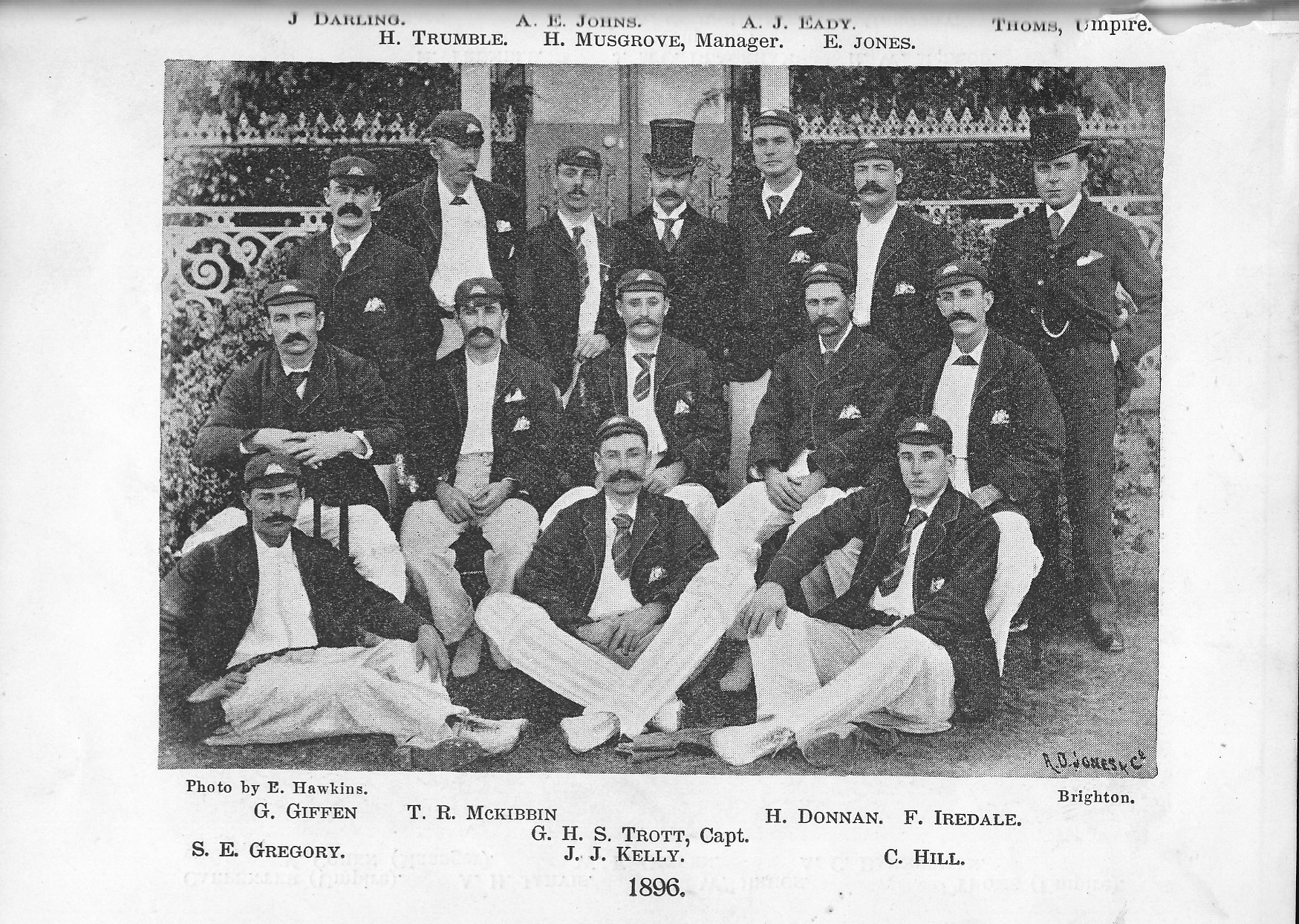
Harry Musgrove, centre of back row, manager of the 1896 Australian cricket team

He was the successful manager of the Australian team in England in 1896, "where his tact and courtesy contributed significantly to a harmonious tour". He also managed the Australian baseball team that toured America in 1897.

Musgrove managed the major Melbourne theatres the Theatre Royal and the Princess Theatre. He managed the Australian and New Zealand tours of Nellie Stewart.

Musgrove wrote a series of memoirs for the Melbourne weekly Table Talk that appeared between 12 August 1926 and 25 November 1926 with the title "Stage Secrets". While mostly concerned with his theatrical career, they also covered his cricketing days as player and manager.

Musgrove died at his home in the Sydney suburb of Darlinghurst in November 1931. His wife predeceased him, but he was survived by two sons and a daughter.

== See also ==
- List of Victoria first-class cricketers
