= Frank Walters =

Australian cricketer

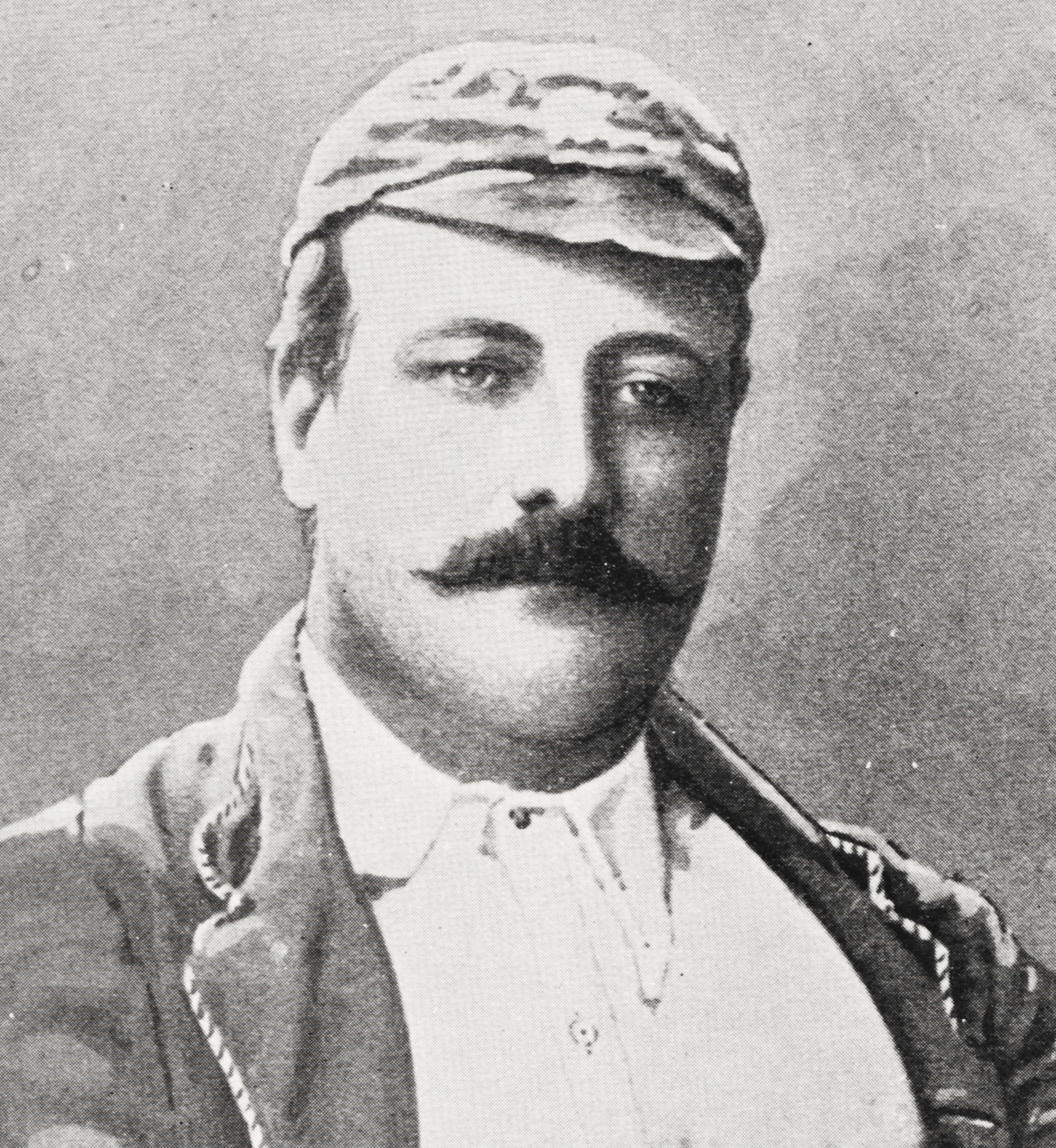

Personal information
- Full name: Francis Henry Walters
- Born: 9 February 1860; East Melbourne, Victoria, Australia
- Died: 1 June 1922 (aged 62) at sea, off Bombay, India
- Height: 1.89 m (6 ft 2 1/2 in)
- Batting: Right-handed
- Bowling: Right-arm medium-pace

International information
- National side: Australia
- Only Test (cap 42): 21 March 1885 v England

Domestic team information
- Years: Team
- 1880/81–1893/94: Victoria
- 1895/96: New South Wales

Career statistics
Competition	Tests	First-class
Matches	1	56
Runs scored	12	1755
Batting average	6.00	20.17
100s/50s	0/0	4/5
Top score	7	150
Balls bowled	0	146
Wickets	0	1
Bowling average	–	81.00
5 wickets in innings	0	0
10 wickets in match	0	0
Best bowling	–	1/17
Catches/stumpings	2/0	31/0
- Source: Cricinfo

Francis Henry Walters (9 February 1860 – 1 June 1922) was an Australian cricketer. He played in one Test match in March 1885, and played first-class cricket from 1881 to 1896.

== Life and career ==
Beginning with Victoria in 1880–81, Walters had played six first-class matches, with a top score of 32, when he was selected for his only Test, the Fifth Test against England in 1884–85. Batting in the middle order, he scored 7 and 5, and England won by an innings and thus won the series 3–2. He reached 50 for the first time, and went on to score 122, for The Rest against the Australian XI in 1888–89, and it was probably this innings that led to his selection in the Australian team to tour England in 1890.

Walters was not successful in England, scoring 351 runs at an average of only 10.02. He displayed his best form in the seasons after the tour, when other players were preferred for the Australian team. Opening the innings for Victoria against New South Wales in 1890–91, he scored 106 in a team total of 181.

He moved to Sydney in 1895 after purchasing the Criterion Hotel there, and played a few matches in 1895–96 for New South Wales. All four of his first-class centuries were scored at the Sydney Cricket Ground. Writing after Walters' death, the Test player and journalist Jack Worrall said, "He was class enough for any company in the land as a batsman, though he was particularly slow in the field."

Walters married Clara Louisa Barber in Melbourne in January 1884. He became a prosperous real estate investor in Sydney. He died at sea off Bombay (Note: According to cricket authorities, but contemporary newspaper reports say he died after his ship left Colombo for Sydney.) while he and his wife were returning to Australia after an extended holiday in England.

== See also ==
- List of Victoria first-class cricketers
- List of New South Wales representative cricketers
