= James Horan (cricketer) =

Australian cricketer

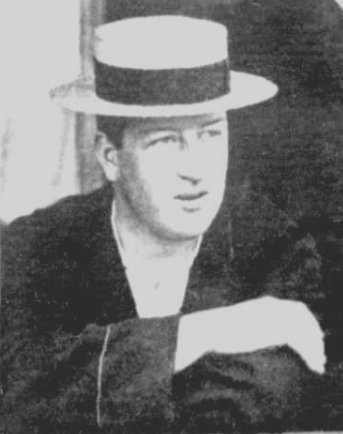

Personal information
- Born: 8 June 1880; Melbourne, Australia
- Died: 1 November 1945 (aged 65); Melbourne, Australia

Domestic team information
- Years: Team
- 1900/01–1909/10: Victoria
- Source: Cricinfo, 16 August 2015

James Horan (8 June 1880 – 1 November 1945) was an Australian cricketer. He played twenty first-class cricket matches for Victoria between 1901 and 1910.

James was the son of Australian Test cricketer Tom Horan. He began his district cricket career by playing for East Melbourne, moved to Prahran where he became captain, and later captained a Malvern cricket team in the 1920s. In 1908 he suspended his career by moving to England to pursue playing for Middlesex, however he was not selected for the county and returned to Australia and played for Victoria in the 1909/10 season.

In his career James was a dentist and worked in Malvern for thirty-five years. He died in 1945 after a short illness and was survived by his widow, his daughter Betty, and his son James, who was a Lieutenant in the Australian Imperial Force.
