= John Payne (umpire) =

Australian cricket umpire (died 1928)

John William Payne (c. 1844 – 12 May 1928 at Glebe, Sydney) was a Test match umpire.

Payne officiated in one match between Australia and England in Sydney from 20 February 1885 to 24 February 1885. The match was won by Australia by only six runs thanks to an 80-run tenth wicket partnership, and a 10 wicket bag by Fred Spofforth. Payne's colleague was Ted Elliott. Payne had played for the XXII of New South Wales against the visiting English team under George Parr in 1863/64.

Payne started work at Mort's Dock in the Sydney suburb of Balmain in 1868. He worked there for 56 years.

== See also ==
- Australian Test Cricket Umpires
- List of Test umpires
