= William Bruce (cricketer) =

Australian cricketer (1864–1925)

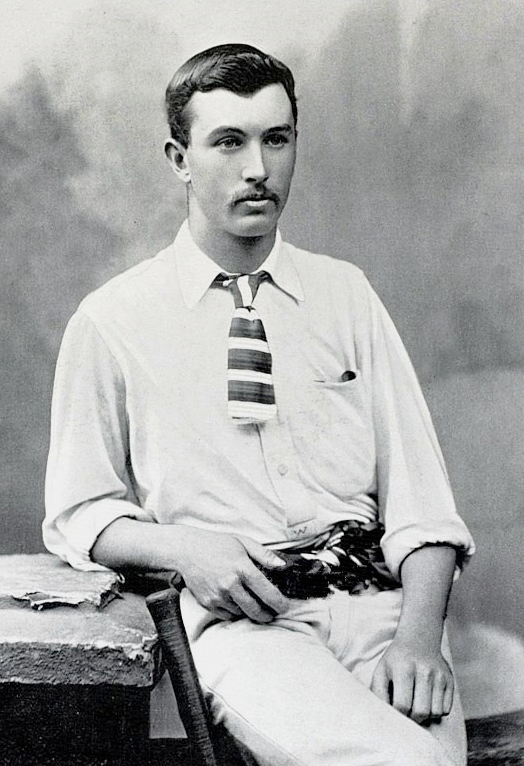

Personal information
- Born: 22 May 1864; South Yarra, Melbourne, Australia
- Died: 3 August 1925 (aged 61); Elwood, Melbourne, Australia
- Batting: Left-handed
- Bowling: Left-arm medium-pace

International information
- National side: Australia
- Test debut (cap 32): 1 January 1885 v England
- Last Test: 1 March 1895 v England

Domestic team information
- Years: Team
- 1882-83 to 1903-04: Victoria

Career statistics
Competition	Tests	First-class
Matches	14	145
Runs scored	702	5731
Batting average	29.25	23.97
100s/50s	0/5	4/28
Top score	80	191
Balls bowled	988	9642
Wickets	12	143
Bowling average	36.66	29.67
5 wickets in innings	0	5
10 wickets in match	0	0
Best bowling	3/88	7/72
Catches/stumpings	12/0	102/0
- Source: Cricinfo, 28 December 2020

William Bruce (22 May 1864 – 3 August 1925) was an Australian cricketer who played in 14 Test matches between 1885 and 1895. He became a lawyer, practising in Melbourne.

== Life and career ==
Bruce was educated at Scotch College in Melbourne. Usually known as "Billy", he played his first first-class match for Victoria in November 1882 against the touring English team, top-scoring in the second innings with 40. In Melbourne senior cricket in 1883-84, playing for Melbourne against Hotham, he scored 328 not out, which was then a record individual score for all cricket in Australia.

A left-handed batsman, left-arm medium-pace bowler and brilliant cover fieldsman who could throw strongly with either arm, Bruce was renowned for his batting style: "he was the essence of grace in his batting, with a late cut that has never been surpassed among Australian batsmen". Johnnie Moyes described his batting as brilliant, charming and "sometimes frivolous", but his defence was not of the same quality, "and probably that is why his Test record was not more distinguished".

Bruce made his Test debut in the second match of the 1884-85 series after 10 of the Australian players went on strike. Although he never made a century in his 14 Tests, he had an average of 29 — very respectable for his era — and he established himself as a batsman of note. He toured England with the Australian teams of 1886 and 1893, and made his highest first-class score of 191 for the 1893 Australian team against Past and Present of Oxford and Cambridge Universities at Portsmouth. His best Test scores were 80 at Adelaide in 1894-95, 72 at Sydney in 1891-92, and 68 at Manchester in 1893, when he top-scored.

In 1888, Bruce joined Melbourne Cricket's baseball club for a four-inning game played against the Chicago White Stockings of the U.S. National League, which were visiting Australia as part of a world tour. Bruce, acting as pitcher for the Melbourne side, was reported to have "very good form for a novice."

For Victoria his highest score was 128 in 1892-93 against New South Wales. It was Victoria's first-ever match in the Sheffield Shield, and Bruce's was Victoria first Sheffield Shield century. His best first-class bowling figures were 7 for 72 for Victoria against the touring English team in 1886-87.

== Death ==
Bruce was found drowned in Port Phillip Bay off the Melbourne suburb of Elwood on 3 August 1925. He had been suffering from depression since an attack of influenza a year before, and was worried about his business. The coroner's inquest found that he had "died from drowning by his own act". He had "kissed his wife goodbye one morning in 1925, saying he wasn't sure after she had asked if he'd be home for dinner ... his legal practice in difficulties, drinking more than was good for him, and battling depression, Bruce drowned himself in the sea not far from his home."

== See also ==
- List of Victoria first-class cricketers
