= Ted Peate =

English cricketer

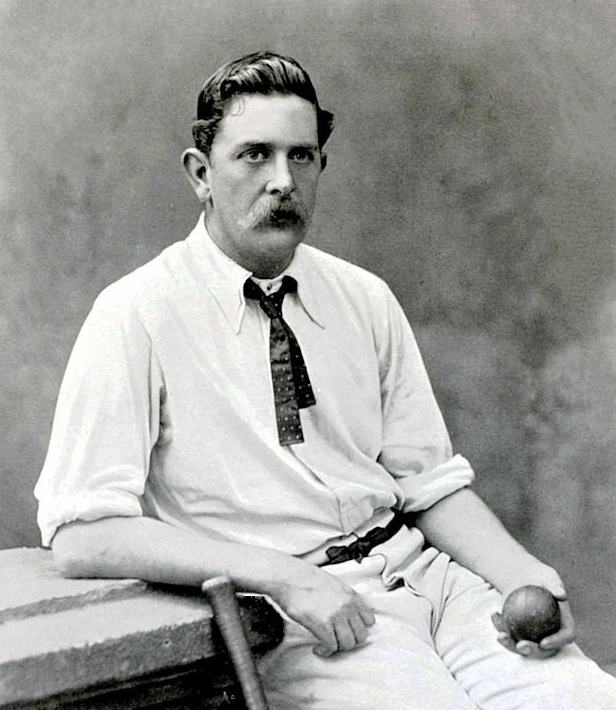

Personal information
- Full name: Edmund Peate
- Born: 2 March 1855; Holbeck, Yorkshire, England
- Died: 11 March 1900 (aged 45); Headingley, Yorks., England
- Batting: Left-handed
- Bowling: Slow left arm orthodox

International information
- National side: England (1881–1886)
- Test debut (cap 32): 31 December 1881 v Australia
- Last Test: 7 July 1886 v Australia

Domestic team information
- Years: Team
- 1879–1887: Yorkshire

Career statistics
Competition	Test	First-class
Matches	9	209
Runs scored	70	2,384
Batting average	11.66	10.64
100s/50s	0/0	0/3
Top score	13	95
Balls bowled	2,096	47,116
Wickets	31	1,076
Bowling average	22.03	13.49
5 wickets in innings	2	94
10 wickets in match	0	27
Best bowling	6/85	8/5
Catches/stumpings	2/–	132/–
- Source: CricketArchive, 25 December 2009

Edmund Peate (2 March 1855 – 11 March 1900) was an English professional cricketer who played for Yorkshire County Cricket Club and the English cricket team.

== Overview ==
Born on 2 March 1855 in Holbeck near Leeds in Yorkshire, Peate's career, which lasted from 1879 to 1890, was exceptional but short. He earned his place in the Yorkshire side in 1879 and, "before the season was over," wrote WG Grace (against whom he enjoyed conspicuous success), "had taken rank with the very best bowlers in England. Every year added to his fine reputation; and no matter the company he played in he came through the ordeal most successfully."

Peate rose in 1880 to the top of the cricketing tree and remained there until the end of 1884. He amply filled the boots of Alfred Shaw, becoming the first-choice slow-bowler for the England elevens of his era.

Despite a serious ankle sprain, which kept him out of action for a fortnight, Peate managed a new record wicket haul for a county-cricket season with 214 in 1882. As Grace affirms, "Peate... had now become the acknowledged best slow bowler of England". His finest (and lowest) hour came in the Test Match against Australia at the Oval of August 1882, when he was the last man in to bat at the end of England's second innings, with his country needing only ten runs to win. Peate got only two before he was bowled by Harry Boyle, giving the Australians their first ever Test win in England. He arrived back in the dressing-room to be admonished for not having left the job to his better-equipped partner, the in-form Charles Studd. "I couldn't trust Mr Studd," Peate explained. Although less famous than the death notice of English cricket which appeared in The Sporting Times on 2 September 1882, another in similar vein was published on 30 August 1882 in C. W. Alcock's Cricket: a Weekly Record of The Game, reading:

Sacred to the memory of England's supremacy in the cricket-field which expired on the 29th day of August, at the oval: "Its end was Peate"

There ought to have been many more years of good work ahead of him, but he put on a great deal of weight and showed a weakness for alcohol. In the summer of 1886, it became evident that his days in first-class cricket were numbered. It was said that he would "have lasted longer had he ordered his life more carefully."

He never entirely lost his skill as a bowler. Even up to the last year or two of his life, he played with success in club cricket in and around Leeds. He died on 11 March 1900 at his home, on St.Michael's Road, Headingley.

Peate was buried in an unmarked grave in Yeadon until a campaign led by his biographer, raised the funds for a headstone. On 22 October 2025, Peate's new headstone was unveiled.
