= William Scotton =

English cricketer

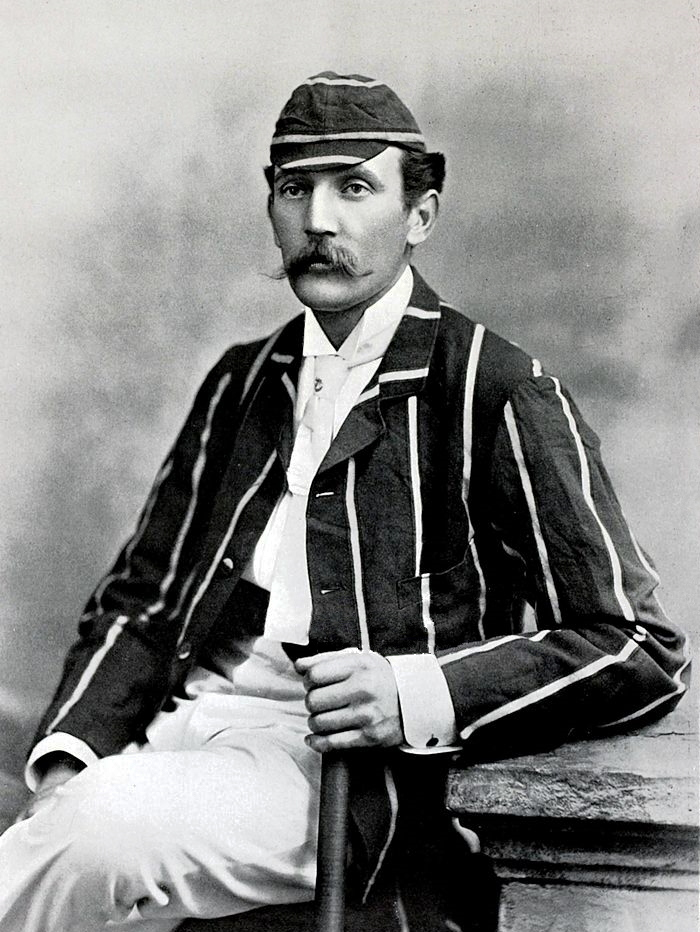

Personal information
- Born: 15 January 1856; Nottingham, England
- Died: 9 July 1893 (aged 37); St John's Wood, London, England
- Batting: Left-handed
- Bowling: Left-arm fast-medium

International information
- National side: England
- Test debut (cap 34): 31 December 1881 v Australia
- Last Test: 1 March 1887 v Australia

Career statistics
Competition	Test	First-class
Matches	15	237
Runs scored	510	6,527
Batting average	22.17	18.97
100s/50s	0/3	4/23
Top score	90	134
Balls bowled	20	765
Wickets	0	8
Bowling average	–	51.25
5 wickets in innings	–	0
10 wickets in match	–	0
Best bowling	–	1/7
Catches/stumpings	4/0	122/0
- Source: CricInfo, 12 August 2022

William Henry Scotton (15 January 1856 – 9 July 1893) was a cricketer who played for Nottinghamshire County Cricket Club and England. Scotton played his first match at Lord's for Sixteen Colts of England against the Marylebone Cricket Club on 11 and 12 May 1874, scoring on that occasion 19 and 0. He was engaged as a groundsman by the MCC in that year and in 1875, and after an engagement at Kennington Oval returned to the service of the MCC, of whose ground staff he was a member at the time of his death. His powers were rather slow to ripen, and he had been playing for several years before he obtained anything like a first-rate position. At one period of his career, however, and more particularly during the seasons of 1884 and 1886, he was among the best professional left-handed batsmen in England.

Scotton committed suicide on 9 July 1893 by slitting his own throat with a razor.

== The 1884 and 1885 seasons ==
In 1884 he scored 567 runs for Nottinghamshire in thirteen matches, with an average of 31.9; in 1885, 442 runs in fourteen engagements, with an average of 22.2; and in 1886, in county fixtures only, 559 runs, with an average of 29.8. This included a knock of 90 for England against Australia at Kennington Oval in August 1884. The match, resulted in a draw, Australia scoring 551 and England 346 and 85 for two wickets. In England's first innings Scotton went in first, and was the ninth man out, the total when he left being 332. During a stay of five hours and three quarters he played the bowling of Fred Spofforth, Palmer, Boyle, Billy Midwinter, and George Giffen without giving a chance, Had he fallen it would have been quite likely that England would have been beaten. Up to a certain time he received very little assistance, but when Walter Read joined him, 151 runs were put on for the ninth wicket.

== The 1886 Oval Test ==
Against the Australian team of 1886 Scotton played two successful innings in company with WG Grace, the two batsmen scoring 170 together for the first wicket for England at the Oval. Scotton's score at the Oval was only 34 in 225 minutes. When Scotton was out, Walter Read came in and made 94 in 210 minutes. Scotton's slow scoring, particularly when compared with Grace and Read prompted London magazine Punch to print the following parody of Alfred, Lord Tennyson's poem "Break, Break, Break":

Block, block, block
At the foot of thy wicket, O Scotton!
And I would that my tongue would utter
My boredom. You won't put the pot on

Oh, nice for the bowler, my boy,
That each ball like a barndoor you play!
Oh, nice for yourself, I suppose,
That you stick at the wicket all day!

And the clock's slow hands go on,
And you still keep up your sticks;
But oh! for the lift of a smiting hand,
And the sound of a swipe for six!

Block, block, block,
At the foot of thy wicket, ah do!
But one hour of Grace or Walter Read
Were worth a week of you!

Scotton paid three visits to Australia, going out with Alfred Shaw's and Arthur Shrewsbury's teams in 1881, 1884 and 1886. In the three tours he averaged respectively in the eleven a-side matches, 20.8, 17.3, and 10.13. Scotton last played first-class cricket in 1891. He then played minor cricket and umpired. Scotton committed suicide on 9 July 1893 by slitting his throat with a razor.
