= Sammy Jones =

Australian cricketer (1861–1951)

Personal information
- Full name: Samuel Percy Jones
- Born: 1 August 1861; Sydney, Australia
- Died: 14 July 1951 (aged 89); Auckland, New Zealand
- Batting: Right-handed
- Bowling: Right-arm fast-medium
- Role: All-rounder

International information
- National side: Australia
- Test debut (cap 30): 17 February 1882 v England
- Last Test: 10 February 1888 v England

Career statistics
Competition	Test	First-class
Matches	12	152
Runs scored	428	5,189
Batting average	21.39	21.09
100s/50s	0/1	5/24
Top score	87	151
Balls bowled	262	3,860
Wickets	6	55
Bowling average	18.66	33.52
5 wickets in innings	0	1
10 wickets in match	0	0
Best bowling	4/47	5/54
Catches/stumpings	12/0	81/0
- Source: cricinfo, 27 March 2017

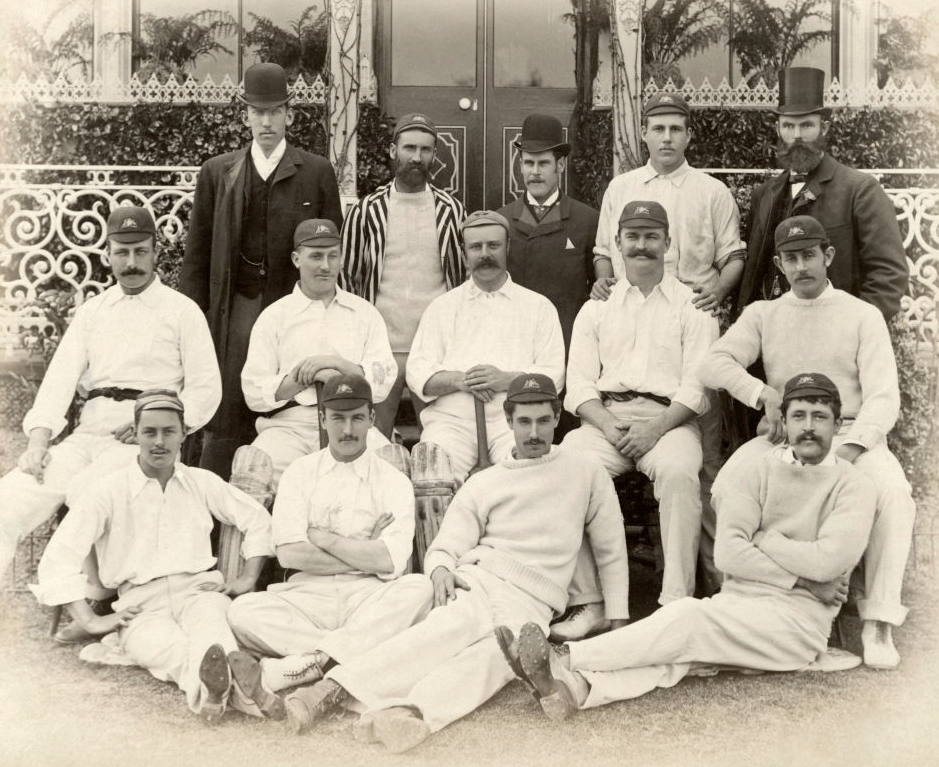
Jones right front row pictured with the 1890 Australia national cricket team

Samuel Percy Jones (1 August 1861 – 14 July 1951) was an Australian cricketer who played 12 Test matches between 1882 and 1888.

A solid right-handed batsman and a handy medium pace bowler, Jones excelled for New South Wales and later for Queensland and Auckland. He toured England with the Australians in 1882, 1886, 1888 and 1890, and New Zealand with Australians in 1886–87 and the Queensland team in 1896–97. On the 1886 tour he scored 1497 first-class runs at 24.95, and two centuries, including his career-best of 151 against the Gentlemen at The Oval. Testament to his batting skill, his first-class career lasted over 30 years.

Despite some solid Test knocks for Australia, he is remembered more for a couple of legends of the early days of Test cricket than for anything he did on the field. He was involved, for example, in an incident with W. G. Grace in the 1882 Test Match, when he was run-out after having, under the assumption that the ball was dead, left his crease to pat down the pitch. Jones's highest Test score was 87, achieved during the time that helped make this score a legend in Australian cricket superstition connected with bad luck.

He moved to New Zealand in 1904 and first coached the Grafton District Cricket Club, and then worked for the Auckland Cricket Association. He played his last first-class match for Auckland in December 1908 at the age of 47.

Jones worked as a clerk and cricket coach at Auckland Grammar School from 1904 until he retired in 1935.
