= Billy Murdoch =

Australian cricketer

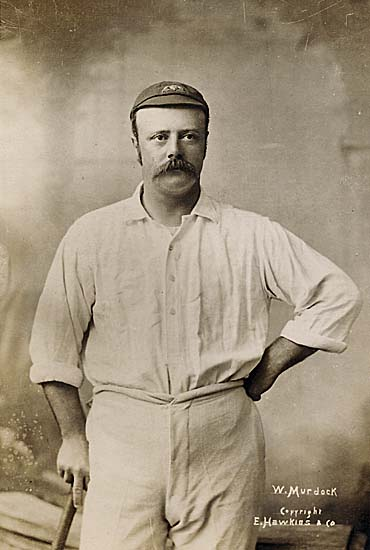

Personal information
- Full name: William Lloyd Murdoch
- Born: 18 October 1854; Sandhurst, Colony of Victoria
- Died: 18 February 1911 (aged 56); Melbourne, Victoria, Australia
- Batting: Right-handed
- Role: Batsman, occasional wicket-keeper

International information
- National sides: Australia (1877–1890); England (1892)
- Test debut (cap 13/79): 31 March 1877; Australia v England
- Last Test: 22 March 1892; England v South Africa

Domestic team information
- Years: Team
- 1875/76–1893/94: New South Wales
- 1893–1899: Sussex
- 1900–1904: London County

Career statistics
Competition	Test	First-class
Matches	19	391
Runs scored	908	16,953
Batting average	31.31	26.86
100s/50s	2/1	19/85
Top score	211	321
Balls bowled	–	764
Wickets	–	10
Bowling average	–	43.00
5 wickets in innings	–	0
10 wickets in match	–	0
Best bowling	–	2/11
Catches/stumpings	14/1	218/25
- Source: CricketArchive, 2 December 2008

William Lloyd Murdoch (18 October 1854 – 18 February 1911) was an Australian cricketer who captained the Australian national side in 16 Test matches between 1880 and 1890. This included four tours of England, one of which, in 1882, gave rise to The Ashes. In 2019 Murdoch was inducted into the Australian Cricket Hall of Fame.

Although Victorian-born, Murdoch was raised in Sydney, and played his Australian domestic cricket for New South Wales, making his first-class debut in 1875. His Test debut came in 1877, in what was retrospectively classed as the second Test match to be played. Murdoch began his career as a wicket-keeper, but at Test level kept wicket only once, with Jack Blackham being preferred. As a batsman, Murdoch scored both the first double century in Test cricket (211 against England in 1884) and the first triple century in Australian domestic cricket (321 against Victoria in 1882). In later years, he settled in England, playing county cricket for Sussex (1893 to 1899, as captain) and London County (1900 to 1904). In 1892, he toured South Africa with England and played in one Test match, making him one of the few cricketers to represent more than one international team. Murdoch's final first-class match came at the age of 49, in August 1904. He died in Melbourne in 1911, aged 56.

== Early life ==
Murdoch was born in Sandhurst (now Bendigo), Victoria, to Gilbert Murdoch and his wife Susanna (née Fleigge). His father was an American of Scottish descent, who had been a corporal in the U.S. Army prior to emigrating from Maryland to Tasmania in 1849. He died shortly before his son's birth. The family moved to New South Wales in the early 1860s. Both Billy Murdoch and his older brother, Gilbert, subsequently studied law at the University of Sydney. Billy Murdoch married Jemima Watson (1863–1917) daughter of John Boyd Watson on 8 December 1884 at the Free Church of England, Collingwood, Victoria, Australia.

== Playing career ==
Murdoch made his first-class entry in 1875, at the time regarded as the finest wicketkeeper in Australia, and a highly rated right-handed batsman. He played in the second Test match ever played, the 1877 clash against England at the Melbourne Cricket Ground (MCG). Later that year, he qualified as a solicitor and opened up a practice, "Murdoch & Murdoch", with his brother Gilbert, although it was short-lived, going bankrupt in 1877. Murdoch established himself as one of the era's greatest batsmen over the next few years, leading Australia in several Test series against England. In 1881–82 he became the first man other than W. G. Grace to score a first-class triple century when, as captain, he made 321 for New South Wales against Victoria at the SCG. The innings comprised 38 fours, nine threes, 41 twos and 60 singles from all of ten Victorian bowlers. It was this knock which established him in the public reckoning as Australia's finest batsman. So unvanquishable was he that Tom Horan (with whom Murdoch would share many a fine batting stand in the years to come) was reduced to bowling Leg theory, the first known instance of that controversial tactic.

Murdoch was never far from controversy. His omission as wicketkeeper in the very first Test resulted in Australia's premier fast bowler, Fred Spofforth, boycotting the match. In 1884 as captain of Australia he was involved in the players' strike, where the Australian players refused to play unless they received a greater share of the gate takings. He was also the batsman whose contentious run out caused friction between New South Wales and a visiting English team led by Lord Harris, which also caused a spectator riot.

His best Test performances more often occurred in England where both his Test hundreds were scored, 153 not out in the first Test in the old country in 1880 at The Oval, and 211 at the same ground four years later. The former score was the first instance of a captain scoring a Test century, whilst the latter score was the first double-century made in Test cricket.

In 1878, Murdoch toured England and North America with Australia's first representative cricket team, participating in a famous victory over a Marylebone Cricket Club (MCC) side. On the 1880 and 1884 tours of England he led the Australian batting averages. In England, he was regarded as a superb captain and enough of a gentleman to be invited to captain Sussex, which he did for several seasons. He was widely regarded the finest Australian batsman of his day, being bettered only by the English champion, W. G. Grace.

Murdoch was more of an off-side player whose drives and cut strokes were regarded as among the best of his day; but his leg-side play was reputedly not so strong, and his ability against good spin bowling was not as impressive as it might be. Also, he was believed to be lacking in command against top-class pace bowling on difficult wickets; if conditions, were perfect, however, his batting often followed suit.

He again visited England in 1890, and although he topped that season's averages, he did not have an opportunity to regain his best form. He then settled in England, qualified for Sussex, and captained the county for several seasons. Along with former Australian Test teammate John Ferris, he represented his adoptive land against South Africa in Cape Town in March 1892.

Murdoch's standing as one of the greatest first-class batsmen of his era were strengthened by his statistics; 16,953 runs scored in 391 matches at the average of 26.86 at a time when batting averages were much lower than in modern times.

Murdoch died in Melbourne, Australia on 18 February 1911; present at the Test match between Australia and South Africa, he was seized with apoplexy during the lunch interval and died later in the afternoon. His body was embalmed and brought back to England for burial at Kensal Green Cemetery in London.

Murdoch's Test captaincy record for Australia was: 16 matches, five wins, seven losses, four draws.

He also became the first substitute to take a catch in only the fifteenth Test match ever played – a feat he managed for the opposition.

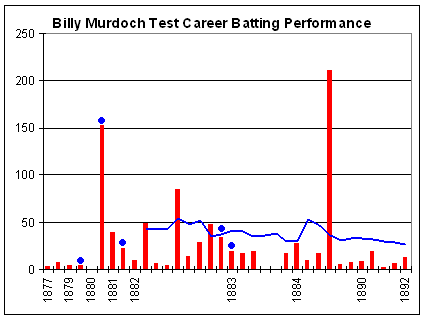
Billy Murdoch's Test career batting graph.

== See also ==
- List of cricketers who have played for more than one international team

Sporting positions
Preceded by Dave Gregory	Australian Test cricket captains 1880 – 1884/5	Succeeded by Tom Horan
Preceded by Percy McDonnell	Australian Test cricket captains 1890	Succeeded by Jack Blackham
Preceded by Jack Blackham	Australian Test wicket-keepers 1877–1890	Succeeded by Affie Jarvis
Preceded by Billy Newham	Sussex county cricket captain 1893–1899	Succeeded by Ranjitsinhji
Records
Preceded by Charles Bannerman	World Record – Highest individual score in Test cricket 211 vs England at The Oval 1884	Succeeded by Tip Foster
