= Billy Bates =

English cricketer

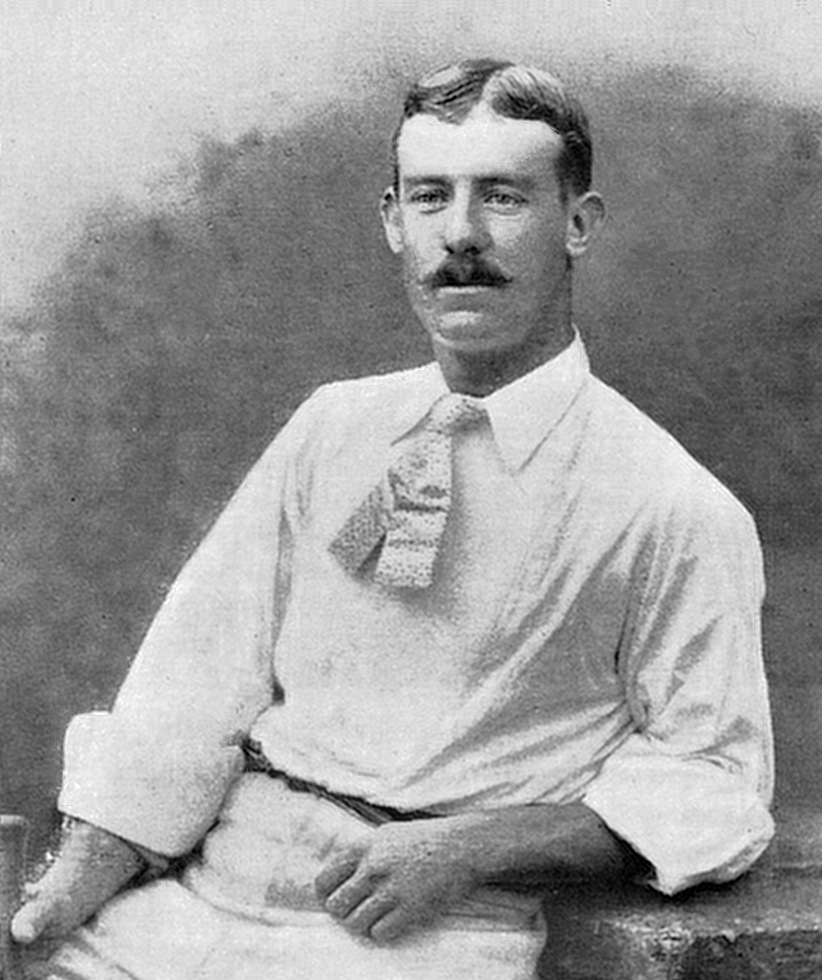

Personal information
- Full name: Willie Bates
- Born: 19 November 1855; Huddersfield, England
- Died: 8 January 1900 (aged 44); Lepton, Yorkshire, England
- Batting: Right-handed
- Bowling: Right arm off break
- Role: All rounder

International information
- National side: England
- Test debut (cap 30): 31 December 1881 v Australia
- Last Test: 1 March 1887 v Australia

Domestic team information
- Years: Team
- 1877–1887: Yorkshire

Career statistics
Competition	Test	First-class
Matches	15	299
Runs scored	656	10,249
Batting average	27.33	21.57
100s/50s	0/5	10/47
Top score	64	144 not out
Balls bowled	2,364	61,033
Wickets	50	874
Bowling average	16.42	17.13
5 wickets in innings	4	52
10 wickets in match	1	10
Best bowling	7/28	8/21
Catches/stumpings	9/–	238/–
- Source: Cricinfo, 2 October 2009

Willie Bates (19 November 1855 – 8 January 1900), known as Billy Bates, was an English cricketer. Skilled with both bat and ball, Bates scored over 10,000 first-class runs, took more than 870 wickets and was always reliable in the field. A snappy dresser, Bates was also known as "The Duke".

== Life and career ==
Born to a humble family in Lascelles Hall, Huddersfield, Yorkshire, Bates became a professional cricketer for Rochdale in 1873 and made his first-class debut for Yorkshire four years later, taking four for 69 in Middlesex's first innings to begin a ten-year career in the first-class game. He played fifteen Test matches for England between 1881–82 and 1886–87, all of them in Australia.

At the Melbourne Cricket Ground in 1882/83, Bates excelled by scoring 55 in England's only innings before taking 7 for 28 (including a hat-trick) to force Australia to follow on. He then claimed 7 for 74 in the second innings to help his team to the first-ever innings victory in Test cricket. Bates set several individual records in this game as his hat-trick was the first for England in Test cricket, and his return of 7 for 28, and his match tally of 14 wickets, were then the best-ever by a Test match bowler. In addition, no Test bowler had previously taken 10 or more wickets and scored a half-century in the same match.

In domestic cricket, Bates topped 100 first-class wickets only once, when he took 121 in 1881, but he passed 80 on another 4 occasions. His best bowling of 8 for 21 was achieved in 1879 for Yorkshire against Surrey at The Oval. As a batsman he passed 1,000 runs in 5 seasons and scored 10 centuries, including 3 in 1884. He made his highest first-class score of 144 not out in 1882 for Under 30 against Over 30 at Lord's, where he also returned an economical second-innings analysis of 22–15–17–3.

The end of Bates's career came suddenly. On a tour of Australia with G.F. Vernon's XI in 1887–88, he was bowling in the nets in Melbourne when he was hit in the eye by a ball struck by a teammate. His eyesight was sufficiently impaired that he was never able to play first-class cricket again, although he did appear in club cricket in the early 1890s and was still able to coach.

His enforced retirement caused him great depression, and on the voyage home from Australia he attempted suicide. At the end of December 1899 he caught a chill whilst attending the funeral of fellow Yorkshire player John Thewlis. His condition quickly deteriorated and he died a few days later in Huddersfield, aged just 44.

An interesting feature of Bates's Test career was that all 15 of his matches were played outside England, which is still the Test record for most matches in a complete career without ever playing at home.

His son William Bates had a long first-class career with Yorkshire and Glamorgan.
