= Tom Horan =

Australian cricketer (1854–1916)

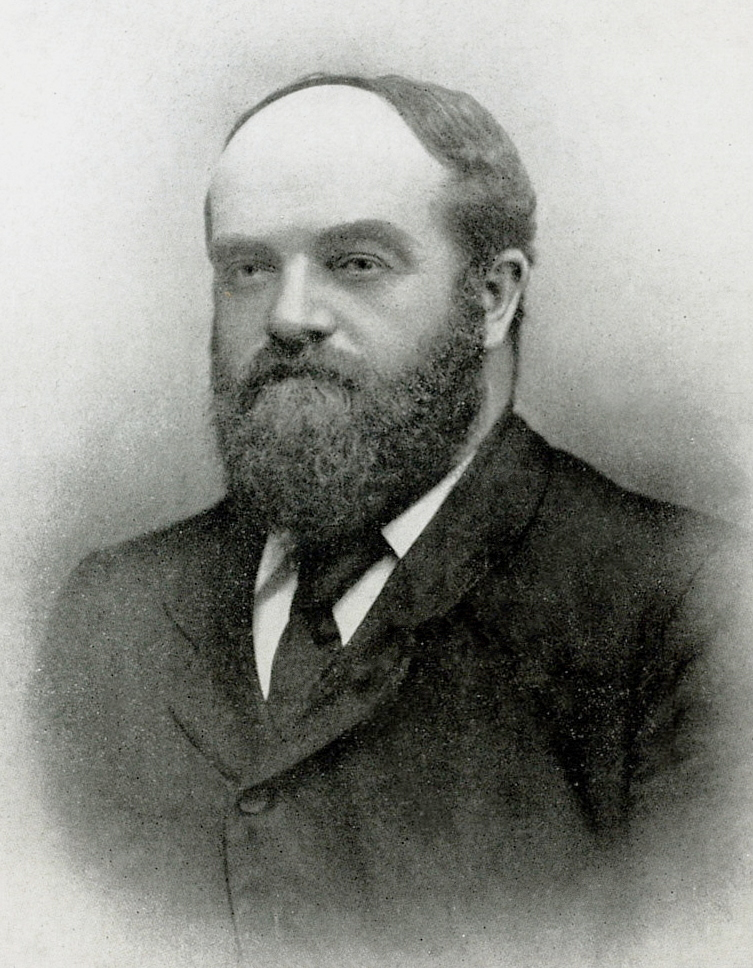

Personal information
- Full name: Thomas Patrick Horan
- Born: 8 March 1854; Midleton, County Cork, Ireland
- Died: 16 April 1916 (aged 62); Malvern, Victoria, Australia
- Nickname: Felix
- Batting: Right-handed
- Bowling: Right-arm roundarm
- Role: Middle-order batsman
- Relatives: James Francis Horan (son); Thomas Horan (son)

International information
- National side: Australia
- Test debut (cap 8): 15 March 1877 v England
- Last Test: 21 March 1885 v England

Domestic team information
- Years: Team
- 1874/75–1891/92: Victoria

Career statistics
Competition	Test	First-class
Matches	15	106
Runs scored	471	4,027
Batting average	18.84	23.27
100s/50s	1/1	8/12
Top score	124	141*
Balls bowled	373	2,044
Wickets	11	35
Bowling average	13.00	23.68
5 wickets in innings	1	2
10 wickets in match	0	0
Best bowling	6/40	6/40
Catches/stumpings	6/–	39/–
- Source: CricketArchive, 26 February 2008

Thomas Patrick Horan (8 March 1854 – 16 April 1916) was an Australian cricketer who played for Victoria and Australia, and later became an esteemed cricket journalist under the pen name "Felix". The first of only two players born in Ireland to play Test cricket for Australia, Horan was the leading batsman in the colony of Victoria during the pioneering years of international cricket. He played for Australia in the game against England subsequently designated as the first Test match, before touring England with the first representative Australian team, in 1878. Four years later, he toured England for the second time and played in the famed Ashes Test match at The Oval.

An aggressive middle-order batsman renowned for his leg-side play, Horan supplemented his batting by bowling medium-pace in the roundarm style common to his era, and once captured six wickets in a Test match innings. During a season disrupted by financial disputes and a strike by leading players, he captained Australia in two Test matches of the 1884–85 Ashes series, but lost both games. Horan's form peaked between the ages of 26 and 29 when he scored seven of his eight first-class centuries, including a score of 124 in a Test match on his home ground at Melbourne in January 1882.

In 1879, Horan began writing a weekly newspaper column that continued until his death 37 years later. He established himself as the first Australian cricket writer who had played the game at the highest level, thus paving the way for many players to enter the media. Bill O'Reilly, the noted Australian player-writer of the twentieth century, described him as, "the cricket writer par excellence". Horan's documentation of the early years of Australian cricket are the basis for many works on the subject: Gideon Haigh wrote that any, "serious scholar in the field ... should probably acquaint himself with Tom Horan." An anthology of his articles was published for the first time in 1989 when he was posthumously inducted into the Sport Australia Hall of Fame for his writing. In part, his citation read, "... it was as the first nationally known cricket writer that he made his major contribution to the game."

== Early years ==
Born in the town of Midleton near the Irish city of Cork, Horan emigrated to Australia with his parents and siblings as a small child. In Melbourne, he attended Bell Street School in Fitzroy and formed a friendship with Jack Blackham; Blackham encouraged in Horan a love of cricket. Horan made his first-class debut for Victoria in the season of 1874/75.

== Test cricket ==
Completed Test career bowling averages (Note: Qualification: 10 wickets, career completed.)
Bowler	Average
Charles Marriott (ENG)	8.72
Frederick Martin (ENG)	10.07
George Lohmann (ENG)	10.75
Laurie Nash (AUS)	12.60
John Ferris (AUS/ENG)	12.70
Tom Horan (AUS)	13.00
Harry Dean (ENG)	13.90
Albert Trott (AUS/ENG)	15.00
Mike Procter (SA)	15.02
Jack Iverson (AUS)	15.23
Tom Kendall (AUS)	15.35
Alec Hurwood (AUS)	15.45
Billy Barnes (ENG)	15.54
John Trim (WI)	16.16
Billy Bates (ENG)	16.42

=== 1st Test 1876–77 ===
At age 23, Tom Horan was selected to play in the first Test between Australia and England in March 1877. Australia won the toss and elected to bat. After the fall of the first wicket, that of Nat Thomson, Horan made his way to the wicket. At 23 years 7 days old he was the youngest Test Cricketer at that time. He passed George Ulyett, the England No: 4, who was 2 years 138 days older than Tom Horan. When Jack Blackham, the Australia No: 8 Batsman, came out to bat Tom Horan dropped to 2nd youngest as Jack Blackham was 64 days younger. With Charles Bannerman (who would eventually retire hurt on 165), Horan put on 38 runs for the second wicket before he was dismissed for 12. In the second innings, the young batsman made twenty, the highest score in Australia's 104 all out. Australia won the historic match by 45 runs.

=== Later Test career ===
Although he was not selected to play in Second Test of the inaugural Test series, Horan did enjoy a regular place in the Australian Test team into the mid-1880s. His highest Test score of 124 was made in the First Test of the 1881/82 season against England. Horan toured England twice, in 1878 and 1882, but played only one Test in that country, at the Oval in 1882.

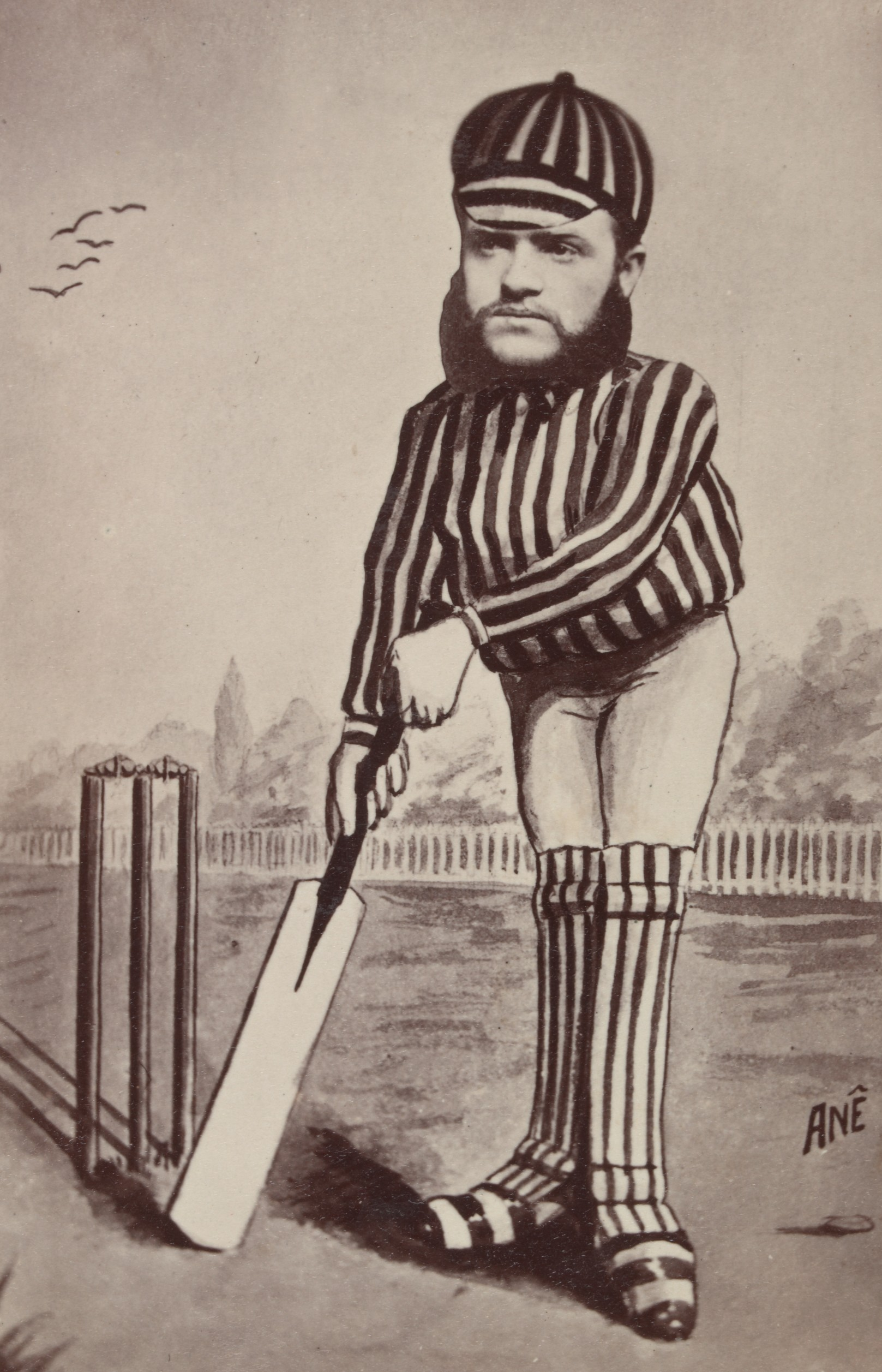
Caricature of Horan in 1878

In 1884, the Australian Test team – minus Horan – demanded a significant pay rise. When organisers refused the request, the team went on strike. With the Second Test against England due to start in Melbourne, selectors were forced to choose an entirely new team. Horan was selected as captain. His team consisted on nine debutants (five of whom never played Tests again). Australia lost the Test by 10 wickets. In the following Test, Horan, having been stripped of his captaincy duties, made a significant impact with the ball, returning figures of 6/40 from 37.1 four-ball overs in England's first innings at the Sydney Cricket Ground. Horan played his final Test on 21 March 1885. He scored a duck in the first innings and made 20 in the second before being bowled by William Attewell, and bowled three wicketless overs for five runs as England took an innings victory.

== Writing ==
He turned his attention to journalism, writing a regular cricket column for The Australasian, a weekly published by Melbourne's Argus newspaper. Haigh writes that Horan "was not an adventurous stylist: he wrote, instead, with his ears and eyes, with a sense of the telling remark and the evocative detail." He never attached his own name to his writings, preferring to use the pseudonym "Felix". Horan continued contributing to The Australasian until his death in 1916.

== Personal life ==
In May 1879, Horan married Kate Pennefather, the daughter of a Melbourne police officer. They had nine children. Two of Horan's sons played first-class cricket for Victoria in the early 1900s.

== Notes ==
Preceded by Billy Murdoch	Australian Test cricket captain 1884/85	Succeeded by Hugh Massie
