= Harry Boyle (cricketer) =

Australian cricketer (1847–1907)

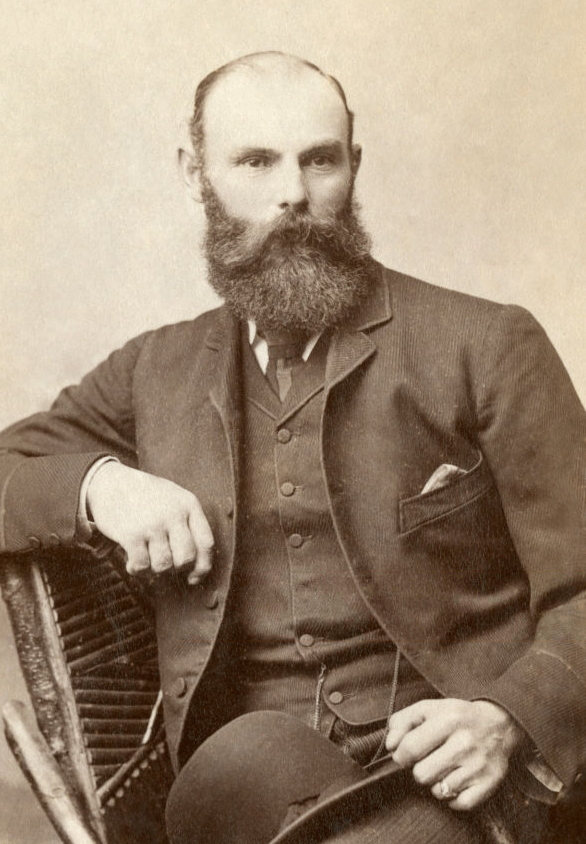
- Boyle in about 1880

Personal information
- Full name: Henry Frederick Boyle
- Born: 10 December 1847; Sydney, New South Wales, Australia
- Died: 21 November 1907 (aged 59); Bendigo, Victoria
- Batting: Right-handed
- Bowling: Right-arm medium

International information
- National side: Australia (1879–1884)
- Test debut (cap 17): 2 January 1879 v England
- Last Test: 12 December 1884 v England

Career statistics
Competition	Test	First-class
Matches	12	140
Runs scored	153	1,711
Batting average	12.75	10.24
100s/50s	0/0	1/1
Top score	36*	108
Balls bowled	1,743	16,429
Wickets	32	370
Bowling average	20.03	15.38
5 wickets in innings	1	26
10 wickets in match	0	6
Best bowling	6/42	7/32
Catches/stumpings	10/–	126/–
- Source: CricInfo, 31 January 2020

Henry Frederick Boyle (10 December 1847 – 21 November 1907) was a leading Australian cricketer of the 1870s and 1880s.

== Early life ==
The Boyle family moved from Sydney to the Bendigo area in 1853. After a period of gold prospecting, Daniel Boyle (Harry's father) settled in Sydney Flat (now Woodvale) where he ran the Australian Store.

Harry Boyle learned his cricket from gold prospector and Bendigo Advertiser journalist, John Glen.

Boyle was one of the locals who helped create the Sydney Flat Cricket Ground circa 1862. In March 2023, the Woodvale Community Group named the ground, the Henry Frederick (Harry) Boyle Oval in recognition of his sporting achievements.

== Cricketing career ==
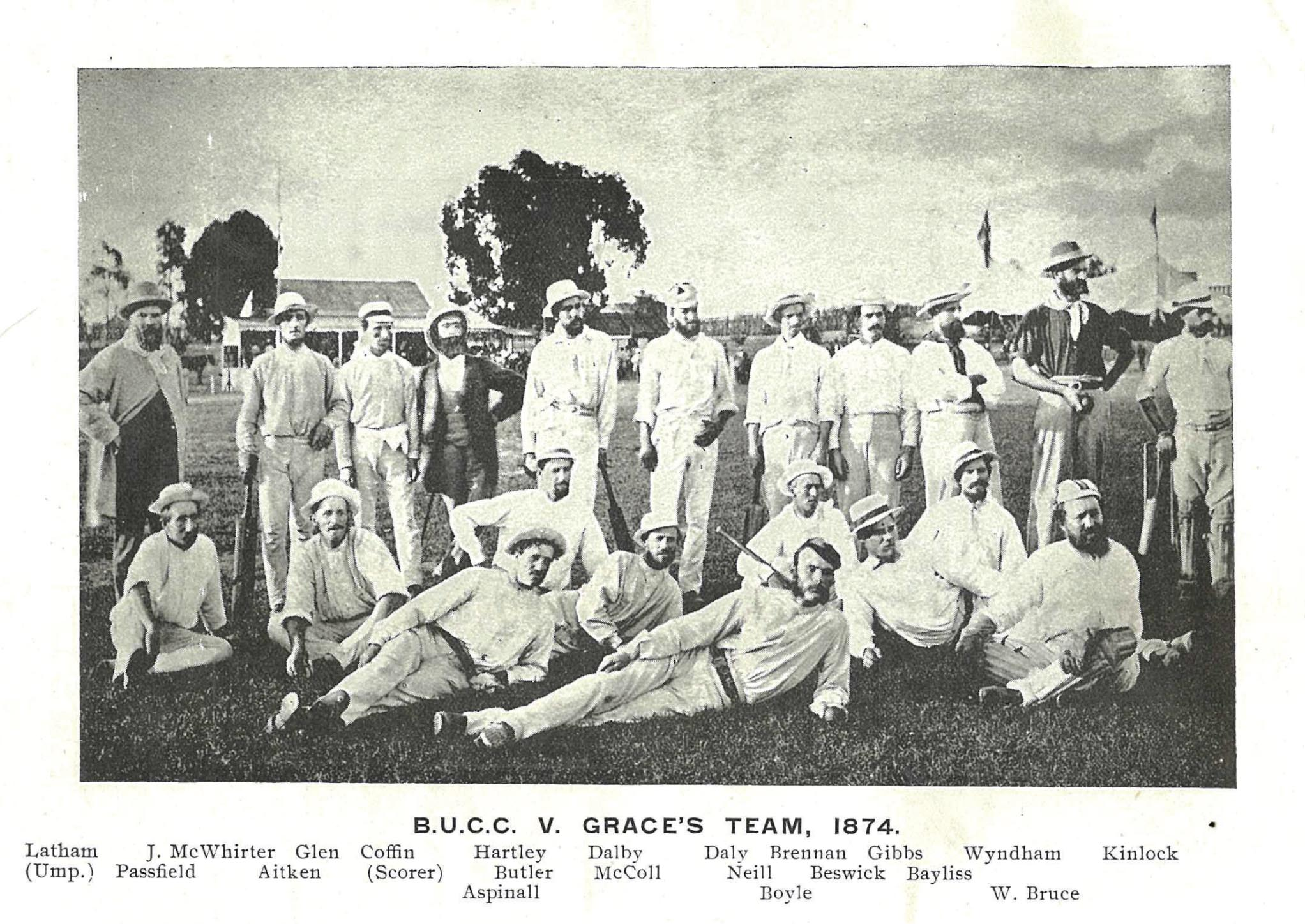
The Bendigo team to play Grace's XI in 1874

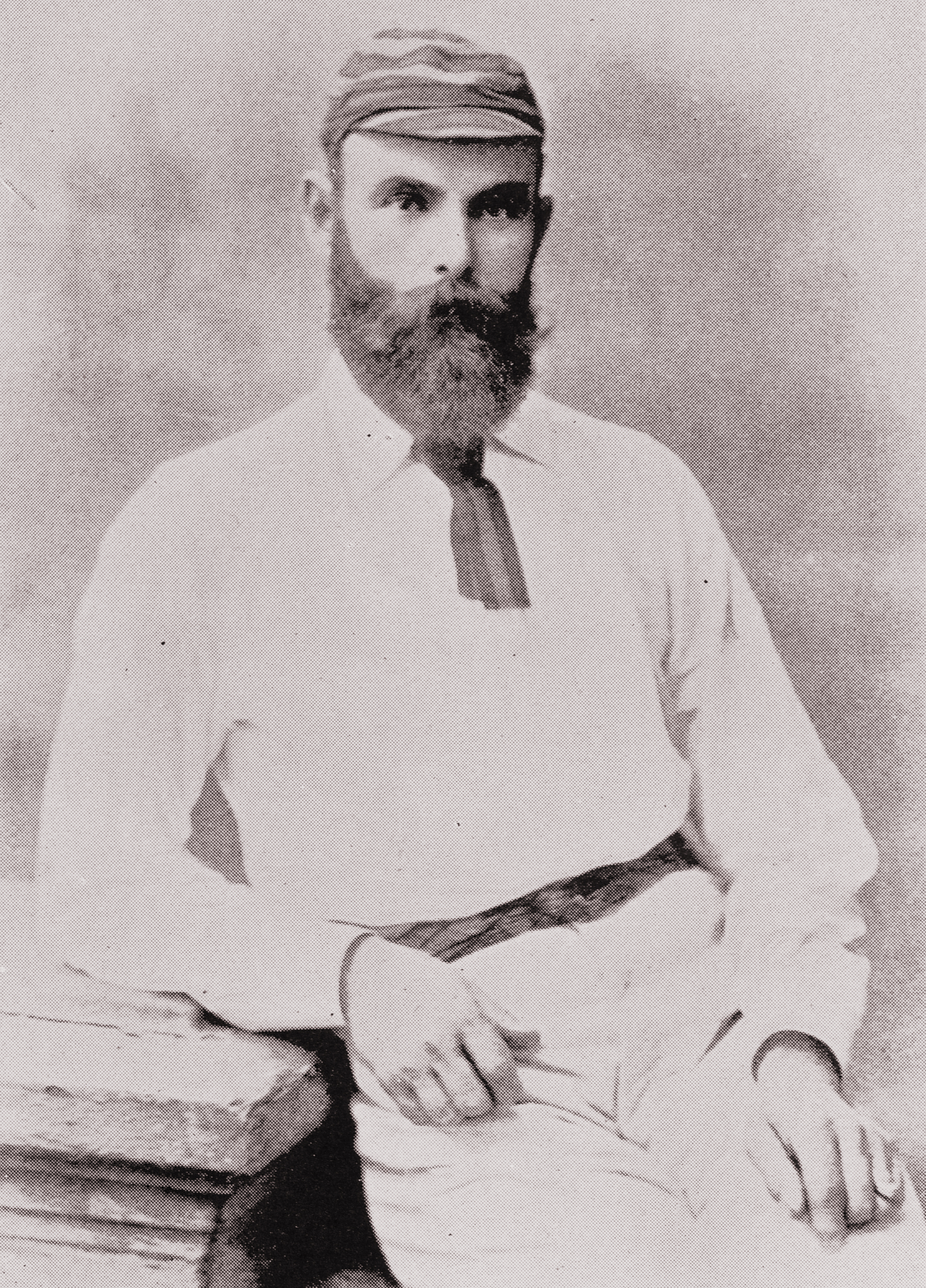
Portrait of cricketer Henry Frederick (Harry) Boyle

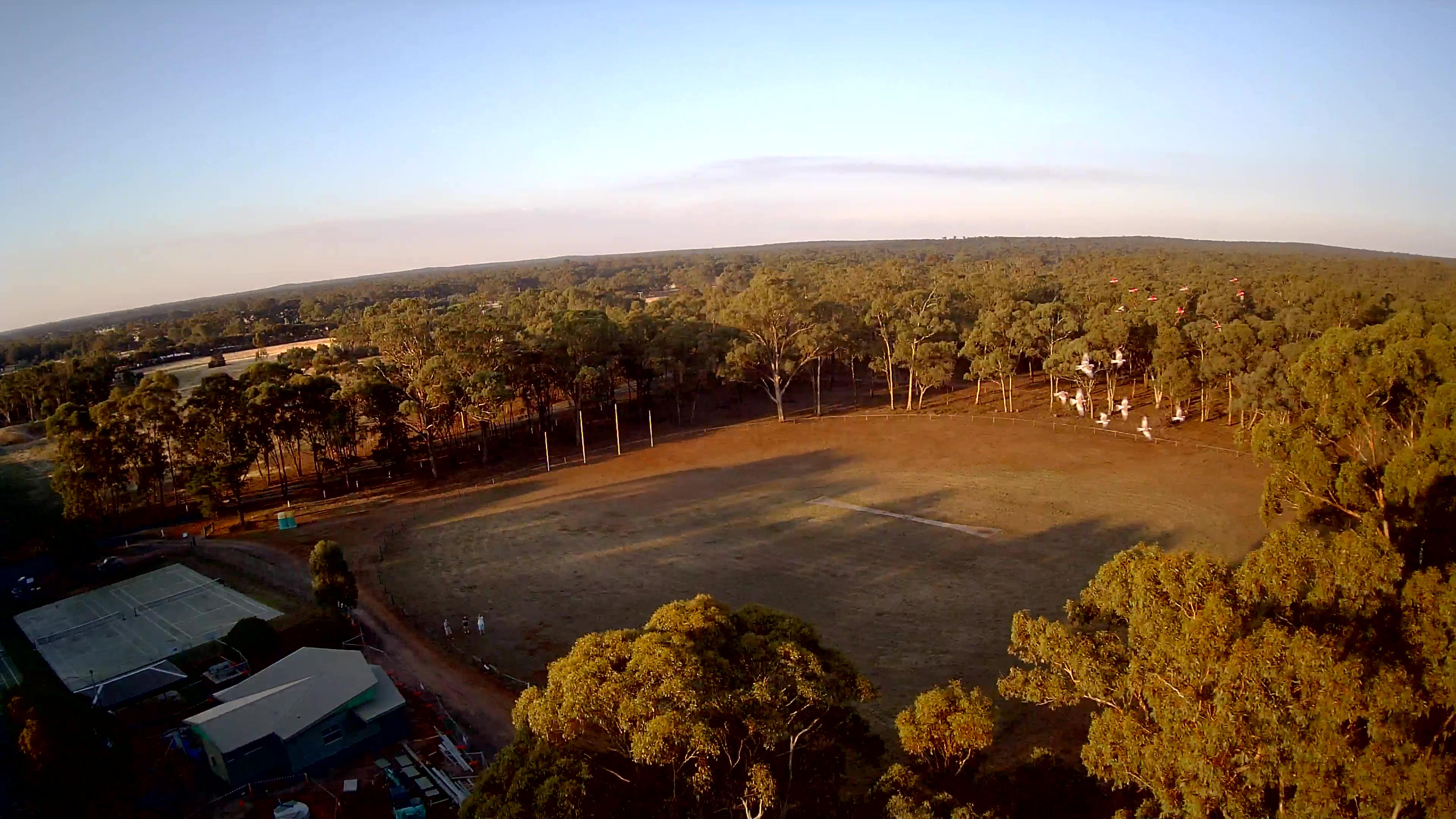
Aerial picture of the Henry Frederick (Harry) Boyle Oval courtesy of Jack Watson.

=== SFCC and BUCC ===
As a young man, Boyle played for the Sydney Flat Cricket Club (a club he helped form). His ability was soon recognised and he was asked to play for the Bendigo United Cricket Club first appearing for them in 1864. The BUCC was the "big" club in the area at that time.

Boyle's figures for the years he played with the BUCC are:

Batting - 105 innings 1923 runs 18.3 average

Bowling - 352 wickets 1855 runs 5.2 average

Boyle's form for the BUCC brought him to the attention of both the East Melbourne Cricket Club as well as Victoria. He first represented Victoria in March 1872 when he scored 27 runs but did not get to bowl. The following year in December 1873, he became the first Australian to bowl W G Grace playing for XV of Victoria against Grace's touring English XI.

=== EMCC ===
From the cricket season of 1872, Boyle would travel to Melbourne each weekend to play with the East Melbourne Cricket Club. He moved to Melbourne permanently in 1874 and became captain of the EMCC in 1875 following the retirement of Dan Wilkie from first class cricket. Boyle's figures for first eleven matches he played with the EMCC:

Batting - 211 innings 4352 runs 23.5 average (Between 1872 and 1896)

Bowling - 15562 balls 5113 runs 619 wickets 8.161 average (Between 1872 and 1874)

=== Victoria ===
Boyle represented Victoria 28 times and was also a selector.

Batting - 51 innings 614 runs 12.03 average

Bowling - 3700 balls 1213 runs 62 wickets 19.56 average

=== Australia ===
Boyle visited England with the Australian touring teams, of 1878, 1880, 1882, 1884, 1888 and in 1890 as manager. He was chosen as captain for the 1880 tour but a shipboard team meeting voted to replace him with the more outgoing Billy Murdoch before their arrival.

An outstanding medium-pacer, Boyle's greatest strengths were said to be the accuracy of his deliveries and his ability to probe a batsman's weaknesses. W G Grace wrote of Boyle in his 1899 Cricketing Reminiscences, 'Boyle had a rare head on his shoulders, but was often successful in getting batsmen out when other bowlers as good had tried and completely failed.'

His bowling was considered to be particularly effective under English conditions. His achievements with the ball were often overshadowed by the exploits of his teammate, "The Demon Bowler", Fred Spofforth. While this was the case, the Sydney newspaper the Referee noted, '. . . Boyle bowled more with his head than Spoff did. And it was a deal better head too.'

He was an exceptionally good close-in fielder, too, and a brave if limited batsman. In all, he played 12 test matches.

Batting - 16 innings 153 runs 12.75 average

Bowling - 1743 balls 641 runs 32 wickets 20.03 average

== Football ==
Boyle played Australian rules football for Sandhurst Football Club in 1872 and 1873 and the Carlton Football Club in 1874.

== Boyle and Scott ==
In August 1879, Harry Boyle opened H F Boyle and Co, a sporting goods warehouse on Bourke St in Melbourne. The firm became Boyle and Scott in January 1880 when Boyle's lifelong friend, Dave (The Almanac) Scott joined the firm as a partner.

During its existence, the firm was an important and innovative part of sporting life in Victoria. Of great value to cricket historians are the five editions of Boyle and Scott's Australian Cricketer's Guide which the firm published starting from 1879/80.

The firm closed in 1892, a victim of the economic recession of that time.

== Later life ==
Following the closure of Boyle and Scott, Harry Boyle had an extended break in the Sandhurst/Bendigo area. During that period, he made a few appearances for both of his old clubs, Sydney Flat and Bendigo United.

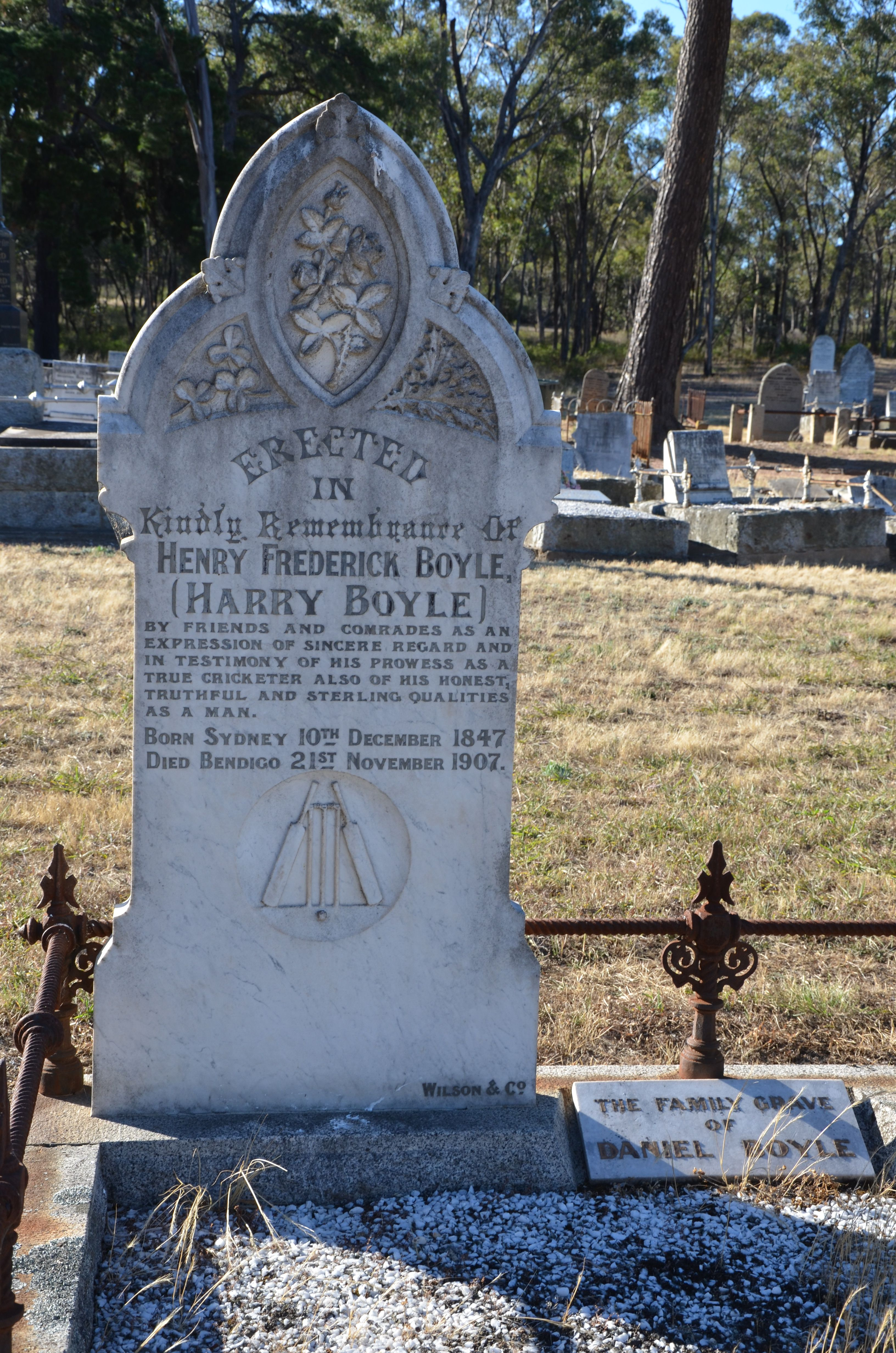
Headstone and burial place of Harry Boyle in the family plot at White Hills Cemetery in Bendigo. The headstone was erected over the grave by his friends.

In 1895 Boyle moved to Brisbane where he played a season for the Brisbane Graziers. In 1896 he moved to Tasmania for a short time before returning to Victoria.

In 1897 Boyle took up the government position of superintendent of track cutting in Gippsland. During the years he and his wife Margaret were in Gippsland, they lived in the town of Walhalla.

In 1903 Boyle was retrenched from his job and he and Margaret left Walhalla and returned to Melbourne. In November of that year newspapers reported that he had been appointed as collector to the Melbourne Benevolent Asylum. This was a position he held until shortly before his death.

== Personal life ==
On 12 March 1879, Harry Boyle married Margaret (Maggie) Wilson Scott. The marriage did not produce any children. Margaret Boyle outlived her husband and died in the city of Hobart on 2 March 1920.

Harry Boyle was descended from two members of the Australian First Fleet, Thomas Chipp (a marine) and Jane Langley (a convict).

== Death ==
During the middle of the year in 1907, Boyle started complaining of problems with his eyes and pains in his chest. Following consultations with Doctor Springthorpe of Collins Street Melbourne), Boyle was admitted to a private hospital and an operation was performed on his throat. Following the operation, it was hoped that he would recover and Boyle travelled to Bendigo to stay at the house of his brother-in-law (Senator James Hiers McColl). Hopes for his recovery were short lived and on 10 October 1907, he was taken from Senator McColl's house to Nurse McKinnon's Private Hospital on Wattle Street. Boyle continued to decline and died "shortly after nine o'clock" in the morning on Thursday 21 November 1907. Boyle, a life-long smoker died as a result of cancer of the esophagus.
