= Percy McDonnell =

Australian cricketer (1858–1896)

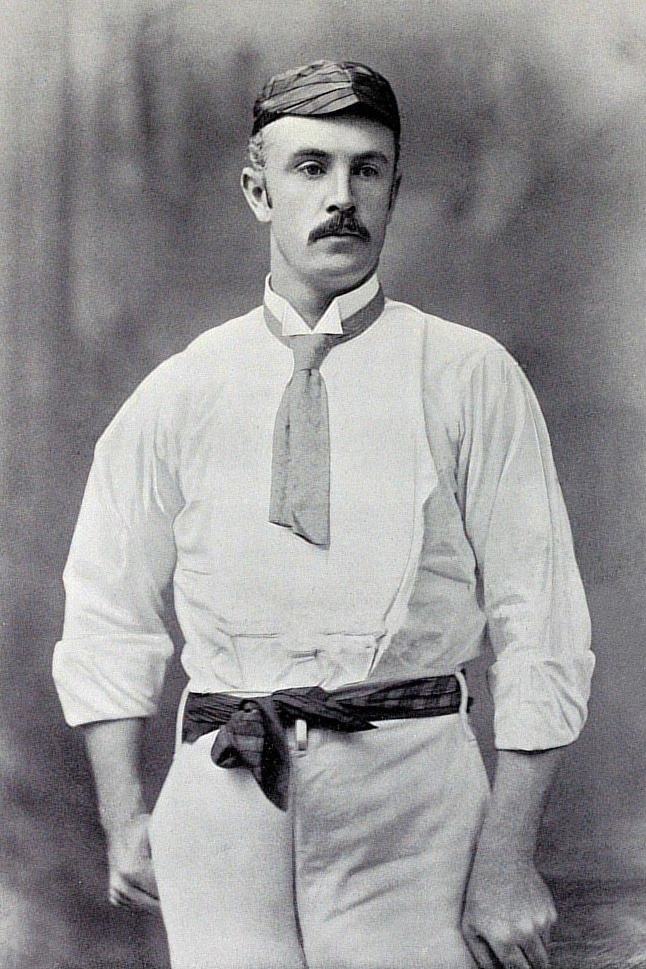
- McDonnell pictured around 1895

Personal information
- Full name: Percy Stanislaus McDonnell
- Born: 13 November 1858; Kensington, London, England
- Died: 24 September 1896 (aged 37); South Brisbane, Queensland, Australia
- Height: 1.85 m (6 ft 1 in)
- Batting: Right-handed
- Role: Opening batsman

International information
- National side: Australia
- Test debut (cap 21): 6 September 1880 v England
- Last Test: 30 August 1888 v England

Domestic team information
- Years: Team
- 1877/78–1884/85: Victoria
- 1885/86–1891/92: New South Wales
- 1894/95–1895/96: Queensland

Career statistics
Competition	Test	First-class
Matches	19	166
Runs scored	950	6,470
Batting average	28.78	23.52
100s/50s	3/2	7/24
Top score	147	239
Balls bowled	52	400
Wickets	0	2
Bowling average	–	123.50
5 wickets in innings	–	0
10 wickets in match	–	0
Best bowling	–	1/7
Catches/stumpings	6/–	99/–
- Source: CricketArchive, 29 February 2008

Percy Stanislaus McDonnell (13 November 1858 – 24 September 1896) was an Australian cricketer who captained the Australian Test team in six matches, including the tour of England in 1888.

McDonnell was born in London in 1858, son of Morgan McDonnell and his wife Frances Marie, née Bonham. In 1864 the family migrated to Melbourne, where he was educated at St Patrick's College, East Melbourne and Xavier College. He played for the Melbourne Cricket Club First XI while still at Xavier, and made his first-class debut for Victoria at the age of 17.

McDonnell was an attacking batsman and his averages are among the very best of his era. His top Test score of 147 was made in a partnership of 199 with Alick Bannerman at the Sydney Cricket Ground when the other 9 batsman in the team contributed 29 to the team score.

In 1886/87, McDonnell became the first Test captain ever to win the toss and elect to field. He had mixed results. England were dismissed for just 45, but nonetheless won the match.

McDonnell married Grace McDonald in Sydney in April 1891. They had two sons. He died of cardiac failure at his South Brisbane residence in September 1896, aged 37. His funeral proceeded from his home to the Toowong Cemetery.

== Gallery ==
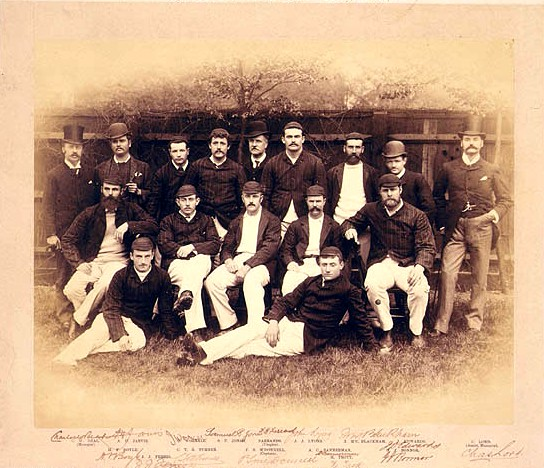
1888 Australian team in England, captained by Percy McDonnell

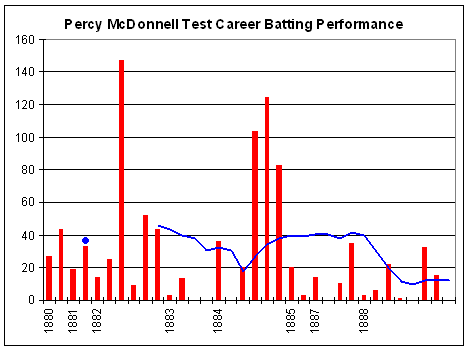
Percy McDonnell's Test career batting graph.

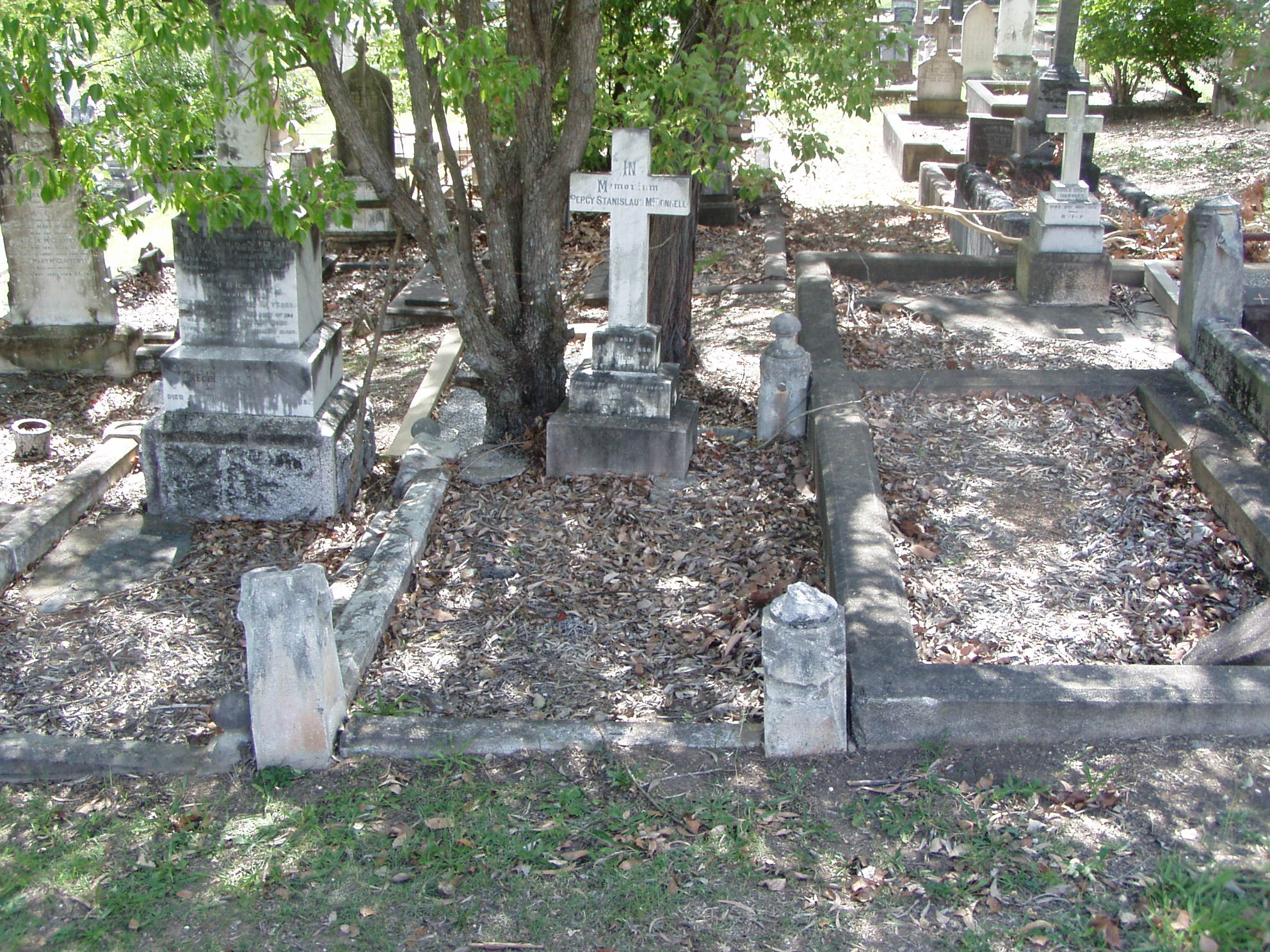
Percy McDonnell's grave.
