= Australian cricket team in England in 1884 =

Cricket tour

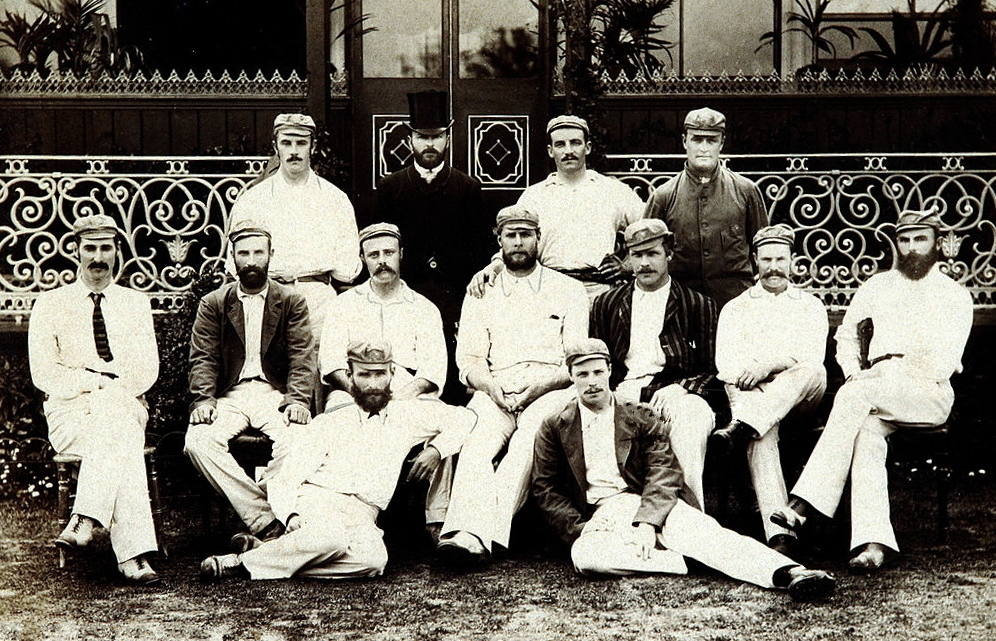
The 1884 Australian cricket team. Back row (l-r): Percy McDonnell, George Alexander (manager), George Giffen, Joey Palmer. Middle row (l-r): Fred Spofforth, Jack Blackham, Billy Murdoch, George Bonnor, Billy Midwinter, Alick Bannerman, Harry Boyle. Front row (l-r): William Cooper, Tup Scott.

The Australia national cricket team toured England in 1884. The team is officially termed the Fourth Australians, following three previous tours in the 1878, 1880, and 1882 seasons. The 1884 tour was a private venture by the thirteen players who each invested an agreed sum to provide funding, none of Australia's colonial cricket associations being involved. Billy Murdoch captained the team and George Alexander acted as player-manager. The Australians played a total of 32 matches in England, 31 of which have first-class status.

1884 was the first English season to feature more than a single Test match. (Note: The term "Test cricket" was not current before the 1890s. The term was first defined by an Australian cricket writer, Clarence Moody, who published a list of matches to which he assigned "Test status", and this received official recognition in 1897 with the 1884 series among those retrospectively recognised.) A three-match series was scheduled which included the inaugural Tests at both Old Trafford and Lord's. The third Test was played at The Oval, which had staged the Tests in 1880 and 1882. England won the Test series 1–0 with an innings victory in the second Test at Lord's, while the first and third Tests were drawn. The 1884 series was the first Ashes series in England, following publication of the mock "ashes" obituary after the 1882 Test.

The tour was dogged by financial controversy with the Australians accused by the British press of being interested only in money. The allegations were refuted by the Australian press but it later became clear, when an England team arrived in Australia the following winter, that there had been a financial dispute between Alexander and the English team manager James Lillywhite, resulting in the two teams at first boycotting each other. The dispute was never evident while Murdoch's team was in England as they completed all their scheduled fixtures, winning eighteen matches and losing seven with seven drawn.

== Australian squad ==
Australia had a 13-man squad captained by Billy Murdoch while George Alexander was player-manager. Squad details below state the player's colonial team at the time, his age at the beginning of the tour, his batting hand and his type of bowling:

Batsmen
| Name | Colony | Birth date | Batting style | Bowling style | Ref |
|---|---|---|---|---|---|
| G. Alexander | Victoria | 22 April 1851 (aged 33) | Right-handed | Right arm fast roundarm | |
| A. C. Bannerman | New South Wales | 21 March 1854 (aged 30) | Right-handed | Right arm medium pace roundarm | |
| G. J. Bonnor | New South Wales | 25 February 1855 (aged 29) | Right-handed | Right arm medium pace | |
| P. S. McDonnell | Victoria | 13 November 1858 (aged 25) | Right-handed | none | |
| H. J. H. Scott | Victoria | 26 December 1858 (aged 25) | Right-handed | Right arm fast-medium | |

Wicket-keepers
| Name | Colony | Birth date | Batting style | Bowling style | Ref |
|---|---|---|---|---|---|
| J. M. Blackham | Victoria | 11 May 1854 (aged 30) | Right-handed | none | |
| W. L. Murdoch | New South Wales | 18 October 1854 (aged 29) | Right-handed | none | |

All-rounders
| Name | Colony | Birth date | Batting style | Bowling style | Ref |
|---|---|---|---|---|---|
| G. Giffen | South Australia | 27 March 1859 (aged 25) | Right-handed | Right arm medium pace and off break | |
| W. E. Midwinter | Victoria | 19 June 1851 (aged 32) | Right-handed | Right arm medium pace roundarm | |

Bowlers
| Name | Colony | Birth date | Batting style | Bowling style | Ref |
|---|---|---|---|---|---|
| H. F. Boyle | Victoria | 10 December 1847 (aged 36) | Right-handed | Right arm medium pace roundarm | |
| W. H. Cooper | Victoria | 11 September 1849 (aged 34) | Right-handed | Right arm leg break | |
| G. E. Palmer | Victoria | 22 February 1859 (aged 25) | Right-handed | Right arm medium pace and off break | |
| F. R. Spofforth | New South Wales | 9 September 1853 (aged 30) | Right-handed | Right arm fast-medium | |

The 1884 squad was very similar to the 1882 squad with Alexander, Cooper, Midwinter and Scott replacing Tom Garrett, Tom Horan, Sammy Jones and Hugh Massie. Cooper and Scott were making their first visit to England.

Australia used the same eleven players in all three Tests, Scott making his debut in the first Test, and in the majority of their first-class matches as Alexander was effectively a reserve who made only five appearances on the tour and Cooper, who also made just five appearances, suffered a long-term injury. Cooper had an accident on the outbound voyage and tore ligaments in the spinning finger of his right hand.

== England Test selections ==
England selected a total of 16 players in the three Tests. Six players (Barlow, Grace, Peate, Shrewsbury, Steel, and Ulyett) played in all three matches. O'Brien (first Test) and Christopherson (second Test) made their Test debuts. Hornby captained England in the first Test, and Harris in the other two.

Details of the England players include their ages at the beginning of the 1884 season, their batting and bowling styles, and the county club (Note: Several England players also represented Marylebone Cricket Club (MCC).) they represented in 1884:

Batsmen
| Name | County | Birth date | Batting style | Bowling style | Ref |
|---|---|---|---|---|---|
| R. G. Barlow | Lancashire | 28 May 1851 (aged 32) | Right-handed | Left arm medium pace | |
| Lord Harris | Kent | 3 February 1851 (aged 33) | Right-handed | Right arm fast roundarm | |
| A. N. Hornby | Lancashire | 10 February 1847 (aged 37) | Right-handed | Right arm medium pace | |
| A. P. Lucas | Middlesex | 20 February 1857 (aged 27) | Right-handed | Right arm slow roundarm | |
| T. C. O'Brien | Middlesex | 5 November 1861 (aged 22) | Right-handed | none | |
| W. W. Read | Surrey | 23 November 1855 (aged 28) | Right-handed | Right arm slow underarm | |
| W. H. Scotton | Nottinghamshire | 15 January 1856 (aged 28) | Left-handed | Left arm fast-medium | |
| A. Shrewsbury | Nottinghamshire | 11 April 1856 (aged 28) | Right-handed | none | |

All-rounders
| Name | County | Birth date | Batting style | Bowling style | Ref |
|---|---|---|---|---|---|
| W. Barnes | Nottinghamshire | 27 May 1852 (aged 31) | Right-handed | Right arm fast-medium | |
| W. G. Grace | Gloucestershire | 18 July 1848 (aged 35) | Right-handed | Right arm medium pace roundarm | |
| A. G. Steel | Lancashire | 24 September 1858 (aged 25) | Right-handed | Right arm fast-medium | |
| G. Ulyett | Yorkshire | 21 October 1851 (aged 32) | Right-handed | Right arm fast roundarm | |

Wicketkeepers
| Name | County | Birth date | Batting style | Bowling style | Ref |
|---|---|---|---|---|---|
| A. Lyttelton | Middlesex | 7 February 1857 (aged 27) | Right-handed | Right arm slow underarm | |
| R. Pilling | Lancashire | 11 August 1855 (aged 28) | Right-handed | none | |

Bowlers
| Name | County | Birth date | Batting style | Bowling style | Ref |
|---|---|---|---|---|---|
| S. Christopherson | Kent | 11 November 1861 (aged 22) | Right-handed | Right arm fast | |
| E. Peate | Yorkshire | 2 March 1855 (aged 29) | Left-handed | Slow left arm orthodox | |

== Tour preparations and voyages ==
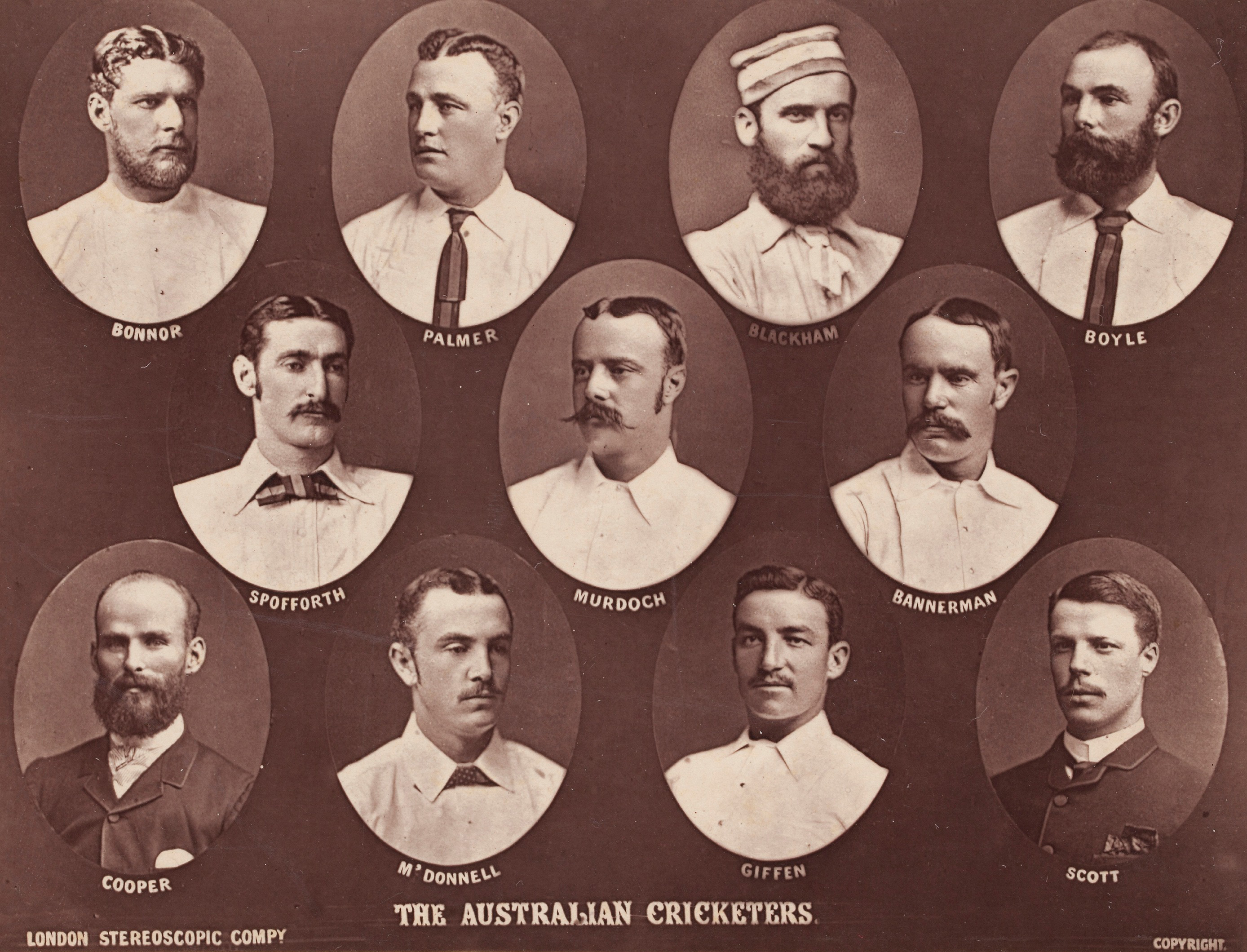
Australian Cricketers, ca. 1884, Scott London Stereoscopic Company

The Fourth Australian team was selected after Christmas 1883, at which time Victoria were playing New South Wales at the Melbourne Cricket Ground (MCG) in a match which ended on New Year's Eve with a three wicket win by Victoria. Another match was arranged to start on New Year's Day, also at the MCG, between the Fourth Australians and a Combined XI. All the tour selections except Spofforth were playing, though Scott played for the Combined XI. Murdoch scored a career-high 279 not out and McDonnell 111 in a total of 619, the result being a draw. A return match with the Combined XI was arranged in February at the Association Ground in Sydney. (Note: The Sydney Cricket Ground was known as the Association Ground until 1893–94, and renamed ahead of the 1894–95 season.) Scott played for the Fourth Australians, replacing Alexander, and Spofforth played for the Combined XI, the Fourth Australians winning by 9 wickets.

Unlike other Australian touring teams, the 1884 team organised the project themselves, and so it was a private business venture which involved none of the Australian colonial cricket associations. The players invested agreed sums to fund their travel and cover any losses.

After one final match in Adelaide, which was the last time South Australia needed odds (i.e., extra men) to compete, the tourists left Melbourne on 11 March 1884 aboard the P&O steamer Sutlej, and arrived at Plymouth on 29 April. With a programme of 32 fixtures arranged, the first game in England began on 12 May at Sheffield Park, Uckfield, and the last game against the South of England was completed on 12 September. The team travelled home on the SS Mirzapore, and reached Melbourne again in early November. Murdoch enjoyed a shipboard romance on the return voyage with an heiress called Jemima Watson whom he married at Fitzroy, Victoria in December, only a few weeks after the Mirzapore berthed.

The outward bound voyage had a short stopover at Colombo, where the Australians played a drawn game on Galle Face Green against a Ceylon XVIII in a one-day match on 1 April. The return voyage also stopped off in Colombo, and the team played another odds match, again on Galle Face Green and drawn, on 23 October.

== Tour itinerary ==
The following is a list of the matches played by the Fourth Australians, all but one of which are first-class fixtures:

| Date | Match title | Venue | Result |
|---|---|---|---|
| 12 May | Lord Sheffield's XI v Australians | Sheffield Park, Uckfield | Australians won by an innings and 6 runs |
| 15 May | Oxford University v Australians | Christ Church Ground, Oxford | Oxford University won by 7 wickets |
| 19 May | Surrey v Australians | The Oval, London | Australians won by 8 wickets |
| 22 May | Marylebone Cricket Club (MCC) v Australians | Lord's Cricket Ground, London | MCC won by an innings and 115 runs |
| 26 May | England XI v Australians | Aston Lower Grounds, Birmingham | Australians won by 4 wickets |
| 29 May | Gentlemen of England v Australians | Lord's Cricket Ground, London | Gentlemen won by 4 wickets |
| 2 June | Derbyshire v Australians | County Ground, Derby | Australians won by an innings and 40 runs |
| 5 June | Lancashire v Australians | Old Trafford, Manchester | Match drawn |
| 9 June | Yorkshire v Australians | Park Avenue, Bradford | Australians won by 3 wickets |
| 12 June | Nottinghamshire v Australians | Trent Bridge, Nottingham | Australians won by 3 wickets |
| 16 June | Cambridge University v Australians | FP Fenner's Ground, Cambridge | Australians won by an innings and 81 runs |
| 19 June | North v Australians | Old Trafford, Manchester | North won by an innings and 22 runs |
| 23 June | Liverpool and District v Australians | Aigburth, Liverpool | Australians won by 1 wicket |
| 26 June | Gentlemen of England v Australians | The Oval, London | Australians won by 46 runs |
| 30 June | Players v Australians | Bramall Lane, Sheffield | Australians won by 6 wickets |
| 3 July | England XI v Australians | Fartown, Huddersfield | Match drawn |
| 10 July | England v Australia (First Test) | Old Trafford, Manchester | Match drawn |
| 14 July | Leicestershire v Australians (Note: The match at Leicester is the only one on the tour that was not first-class, because Leicestershire were not rated first-class until 1895, when they joined the County Championship.) | Grace Road, Leicester | Australians won by 10 wickets |
| 17 July | Middlesex v Australians | Lord's Cricket Ground, London | Australians won by an innings and 29 runs |
| 21 July | England v Australia (Second Test) | Lord's Cricket Ground, London | England won by an innings and 5 runs |
| 24 July | Sussex v Australians | County Ground, Hove | Match drawn |
| 31 July | Players v Australians | The Oval, London | Australians won by 9 wickets |
| 4 August | Kent v Australians | St Lawrence Ground, Canterbury | Kent won by 96 runs |
| 7 August | Gloucestershire v Australians | Clifton College Close Ground, Bristol | Match drawn |
| 11 August | England v Australia (Third Test) | The Oval, London | Match drawn |
| 18 August | Gloucestershire v Australians | College Ground, Cheltenham | Australians won by an innings and 136 runs |
| 21 August | Nottinghamshire v Australians | Trent Bridge, Nottingham | Match drawn |
| 25 August | Cambridge University Past and Present v Australians | County Ground, Hove | Australians won by 142 runs |
| 28 August | South v Australians | Bat and Ball Ground, Gravesend | Australians won by an innings and 107 runs |
| 1 September | North v Australians | Trent Bridge, Nottingham | North won by 170 runs |
| 4 September | I Zingari v Australians | North Marine Road Ground, Scarborough | Australians won by 8 wickets |
| 11 September | South v Australians | The Oval, London | Australians won by an innings and 5 runs |

== Test series ==
=== First Test ===
10 – 12 July 1884
Scorecard
Report

| England | v | Australia |
| 95 (63 overs); Arthur Shrewsbury 43; Harry Boyle 6/42 (25 overs) | | 182 (130 overs); Billy Midwinter 37; George Ulyett 3/41 (30 overs) |
| 180/9 (130 overs); W. G. Grace 31; Joey Palmer 4/47 (36 overs) |

Match drawn
Old Trafford Cricket Ground, Manchester
Umpires: Charles Pullin and Joseph Rowbotham

- England won the toss and elected to bat.
- No play on Day 1.

This was the inaugural Old Trafford Test and, as Chris Harte described it, "the first time that a match of such importance had been staged outside of London". Selection of an England home Test team in the 19th century was the privilege of the host club and Lancashire selected five local players in their squad of twelve, although Jack Crossland missed out and was made twelfth man. Barlow, Hornby, Pilling, and Steel all played as it was believed their presence would boost the gate receipts.

Chris Harte commented that the match was also the origin of Old Trafford's "reputation for wet weather", the game being drawn after rain had made the first day unplayable. The match was therefore reduced to two days play. It was reported that the wicket dried much quicker than expected, and conditions were never difficult for batting. Even so, England were all out for 95 in their first innings, Boyle taking six wickets for 42 runs conceded (i.e., 6/42) with his medium-paced spin, and Spofforth 4/42. Shrewsbury, displaying "masterly technique", scored 43 to save his team from real embarrassment. In their first innings, Australia "hit with more vigour and confidence than their opponents", and scored 182, a lead of 87. Their top scorer was Midwinter with 37. The wicket had dried out on the final day, so England were able to bat out time and secure the draw, scoring 180 for the loss of 9 wickets (i.e., 180/9). Grace was top scorer with a patient 31, and Joey Palmer was the best of the Australian bowlers "with his controlled off- and leg-cutters".

=== Second Test ===
21–23 July 1884
Scorecard
Report

| Australia | v | England |
| 229 (105.2 overs); Tup Scott 75; Ted Peate 6/85 (40 overs) | | 379 (184.1 overs); A. G. Steel 148; Joey Palmer 6/111 (75 overs) |
| 145 (94.1 overs); Tup Scott 31*; George Ulyett 7/36 (39.1 overs) |

England won by an innings and 5 runs
Lord's Cricket Ground, London
Umpires: Frank Farrands and Charles Pullin

- Australia won the toss and elected to bat.

This was the inaugural Lord's Test. England won by an innings after a century by A. G. Steel, and fine bowling by Ted Peate and George Ulyett. The game ended just after lunch on the third day.

Wisden recorded that the main elements of England's success were "the magnificent batting of A. G. Steel and the bowling of Ulyett". Batting first, Australia were reduced to 160/9 despite an innings of 63 by Giffen; but then Scott and Boyle added 69 for the final wicket, Wisden reporting that Scott played "cool, confident, skilful cricket" in an innings of 75. At close of play on the first day, England were 90/3 so the match was evenly poised, with Lucas on 28 and Shrewsbury on 27. Steel commenced his innings on the second morning and shared successful partnerships with Ulyett, Barlow, and Lyttelton. While Steel was in, 261 runs were added and he made 148 including thirteen boundaries. It was the highest score made against the Australians during the season. By close of play, Australia had lost four wickets in their second innings for only 73 runs. Barlow later recorded that the score was 135/5 when he went out to join Steel and recalled Lord Harris, the England captain, saying to him: "For Heaven's sake, Barlow, stop this rot!" Barlow and Steel added 98 for the sixth wicket. Despite another good effort by Scott on the final day, Australia failed to avoid the innings defeat. Ulyett bowled very well but may have been helped by the state of the ground. However, Ulyett is best remembered in this match for taking what Pelham Warner called "one of the historic catches of cricket" when he caught and bowled Bonnor, noted for his powerful hitting. Warner recorded of Steel's innings that George Giffen talked about it most enthusiastically as late as 1911, when the two were in conversation at Adelaide. When Scott was dismissed for 75 in the Australian first innings, he was caught by his own captain Murdoch off the bowling of Steel. Murdoch was on as a substitute for an injured English player, and this was the first time in Test cricket that a batsman was dismissed by a catch taken by a substitute fielder.

Soon afterwards, the London press reported that the entire proceeds of the match, a sum of £1,334, had been awarded to the Australians. This had been agreed beforehand by Alexander and Harris to enable the tourists to cover their costs, but the press disapproved. They accused the Australians of being mercenary, and acting outside the spirit of the game. Harte commented on the extreme bias of the press as, in all their other games, the Australians received only a share of the gate money, "an arrangement appreciated by the county clubs as the visitors' popularity always boosted takings". In fact, Alexander had attempted to secure payment of half the whole gate (main stands and outer grounds) for every match, but the counties refused to share main stand revenue. The agreement brokered by Lord Harris was for the Australians to receive half of all outer ground revenue plus the entire gate for the Lord's Test.

=== Third Test ===
11–13 August 1884
Scorecard
Report

| Australia | v | England |
| 551 (311 overs); Billy Murdoch 211 (525); Hon. A. Lyttelton 4/19 (12 overs) | | 346 (198 overs); Walter Read 117 (155); Joey Palmer 4/90 (54 overs) |
| | | 85/2 (f/o) (26 overs); Arthur Shrewsbury 37 (33); George Giffen 1/18 (7 overs) |

Match drawn
The Oval, London
Umpires: Frank Farrands and Charles Pullin

- Australia won the toss and elected to bat.

The final Test at The Oval was played in hot weather, and Murdoch created a then-record score of 211, the first double-century in Test cricket. Murdoch was helped by three missed chances off the bowling of Ulyett when he had made 46, 171, and 205. England followed on but had only lost two wickets when time ran out, and the match was drawn.

After McDonnell had made 103 out of 158, Murdoch and Scott completed the first double-century partnership in Test cricket. England, as the score mounted, used 11 bowlers: the first time in Test cricket that an entire team, including the wicket-keeper, was called upon to bowl. On this occasion, the wicketkeeper Lyttelton was the most successful bowler, taking 4/19. Grace, keeping wicket to Lyttelton, took a catch to dismiss Midwinter.

The two main features of England's first innings were Scotton's "stonewalling" and Read's (batting at number ten) "hard and rapid hitting". Scotton's 90 in six hours and Read's 117 in two enabled England to reach a respectable 346, but they still had to follow on, 205 runs behind. But the time taken by Scotton's innings left Australia with not enough time to bowl England out again, and the result was a draw.

The Australian innings of 551 is still the Test match record for the highest total without a bowler conceding 100 runs (Peate had an analysis of 2/99).

== Other matches ==
The tour began well for the Australians with an innings victory in their opening match at Uckfield against a team chosen by Lord Sheffield which included W. G. Grace, George Ulyett, Billy Barnes, Alfred Shaw and Arthur Shrewsbury. Although Fred Spofforth, Harry Boyle and Billy Midwinter were all playing, the Australian bowling was performed by George Giffen and Joey Palmer only, and they both took ten wickets in the match. However, the key performance in conditions that helped the bowling was Alick Bannerman's innings of 94 which alone outscored the Sheffield XI's first innings total of 86.

The Australians had mixed success in their next five matches, winning against Surrey and an England XI but losing to Oxford, MCC, and the Gentlemen. An innings of 71 by Tup Scott in a low-scoring match was the key to defeating Surrey by 8 wickets. Centuries by Grace, A. G. Steel, and Barnes gave MCC an innings victory at Lord's. Warner described this feat as "remarkable".

The next ten matches prior to the Old Trafford Test were played mainly in the north of England, and the Australians did very well in this period, through June and into early July. They lost only to the North by an innings at Old Trafford when their batting struggled against Ted Peate and Ulyett while good scores by A. N. Hornby and Barnes ensured the North's victory. Giffen had a memorable game when the Australians played Lancashire at Old Trafford, taking a hat-trick in the Lancashire innings and then scoring 113. That match was drawn but the Australians defeated both Nottinghamshire and Yorkshire by the same three-wicket margin. Spofforth, Palmer, Peate, and Tom Emmett dominated the match at Bradford in which only 255 runs were scored in total. At Trent Bridge, the bowling of Giffen and Palmer enabled the Australians to recover from a first innings deficit of 39 and win. In the return match against the Gentlemen at the Oval, the last three English batsmen including Lord Harris were all stumped by Jack Blackham.

Between the first and second Tests, the Australian victory over Middlesex, whose batters could not cope with Spofforth, was their only win in four matches at Lord's. The Australians struggled in a drawn game against Sussex for whom George Wyatt and Henry Phillips both scored centuries. Spofforth with 14 wickets and George Bonnor with an innings of 68 in a low-scoring match put the Australians back on track when they easily defeated a strong Players XI at the Oval.

An innings of 60 by Lord Harris helped Kent recover from a first innings deficit before the Australians, batting last, collapsed to lose by 96 runs at Canterbury. The first match against Gloucestershire was drawn, W. G. Grace scoring 116 not out for his county. The Australians won the second match convincingly with an innings total of 402 (Giffen 91, Billy Murdoch 89) before dismissing Gloucestershire for only 83. This began a good finish to the tour as the Australians won five of the last seven matches following the third Test. They twice defeated the South by an innings, Spofforth taking a total of 24 wickets in these two matches, but were again beaten by the North, for whom Dick Barlow scored a century and took ten wickets in the match.

== Statistical summary ==
Murdoch, Percy McDonnell, and Giffen all scored 1,000 runs for the Australians in the 1884 season while Scott, Bannerman, and Bonnor topped 900. Murdoch scored two centuries including his 211 at the Oval; Giffen, McDonnell, and Scott one apiece. The outstanding bowler, as on previous tours, was Spofforth who took 205 wickets for the Australians at an average of 12.50 with a best performance of 8/62. Palmer took 130 wickets at 16.14, and the other main bowlers were Giffen (81 wickets) and Boyle (62). Midwinter took 15 wickets while the other players bowled occasionally only. Blackham was the wicket-keeper in 28 out of the 31 first-class matches, Murdoch standing in for him in the other three. Blackham held 23 catches and completed 16 stumpings. Eight fielders held more than twenty catches each, the most being Bonnor's 31.

Putting the Australian performances into perspective, only eight Englishmen made 1,000 runs in the season, and only Harris scored more than Murdoch. Louis Hall with four completed the most centuries while Harris, Grace, Ulyett, and Billy Bates made three apiece. Spofforth was easily the highest wicket-taker, beating the best English bowler Ted Peate by 70 while Palmer was third overall. Seven other Englishmen managed 100 wickets in the season.

In his history, Harry Altham wrote that the 1884 Australians have been equated with the 1882 team, but he himself disagreed with that assessment. He added that George Giffen considered England's team in the final Test to have been the strongest of the nineteenth century.

== Controversy and aftermath ==
Although there had been a prior agreement on the matter, bad feeling about the proceeds from the Lord's Test lingered and, at the end of their tour, the Fourth Australians faced more recriminations from the British press. Among other things, they were accused of "introducing a bloodthirsty spirit", and of "playing too obviously for money's sake". This criticism was countered by The Australasian of 11 October, whose cricket writer Tom Horan, though himself no supporter of Murdoch's team, objected to the "spiteful criticism from certain portions of the English press", and pointed out the "narrow-minded and insulting abuse levelled at the Australian cricketers". In his history of Lord's, however, Warner stated that the Australians had "evidently come into favour", and that "the rows and bickerings of the past were happily over and done with".

The problems spilled over into the next Australian season when an English team formed by Alfred Shaw, James Lillywhite, and Arthur Shrewsbury toured. A disagreement between Alexander and Lillywhite led to members of the Fourth Australians refusing to play against the tourists in certain matches, and then being banned by the colonial authorities from playing in others. Having agreed contracts for matches with the colonial authorities, Lillywhite offered Alexander 30% of the gate receipts from the first two Tests, but Murdoch and the rest of the team insisted on 50%. One outcome was that Australia had to make eleven changes to their team for the second Test after terms could not be agreed with the Fourth Australians. The Fourth Australians had made up the team in the first Test but refused to play in the second, in which nine debutants were necessary alongside Tom Horan and Sammy Jones.

When the Fifth Australians toured England in 1886, the team was selected and managed by the Melbourne Club which was mindful of the past controversy. As a result, Murdoch, McDonnell, and Bannerman were omitted despite still being leading batsmen. Boyle was unavailable, as were Horan and Massie who had toured in 1882, while Alexander, Cooper, and Midwinter were no longer in contention for places. Scott was appointed captain, and the other survivors of 1884 were Blackham, Bonnor, Giffen, Palmer, and Spofforth.

== Bibliography ==
- Altham, H. S. (1962). A History of Cricket – From the Beginnings to the First World War. London: George Allen & Unwin Ltd.
- Harte, Chris (1993). A History of Australian Cricket. London: Andre Deutsch. ISBN 0-233-98825-4.
- Knox, Malcolm (2012). Never A Gentleman's Game. Hardie Grant. ISBN 978-1-7427-0193-6.
- Mortimer, David (2005). Old Trafford – Test Match Cricket Since 1884. Stroud, Gloucestershire: Sutton Publishing Limited. ISBN 0-7509-3667-3.
- Mortimer, David (2005). The Oval – Test Match Cricket Since 1880. Stroud, Gloucestershire: Sutton Publishing Limited. ISBN 0-7509-3668-1.
- Robinson, Ray (1975). On Top Down Under. London: Cassell. ISBN 0-233-99122-0.
- Warner, Pelham (1946). Lord's: 1787 – 1945. London: George G. Harrap.
