= Australian cricket team in England in 1886 =

International cricket tour

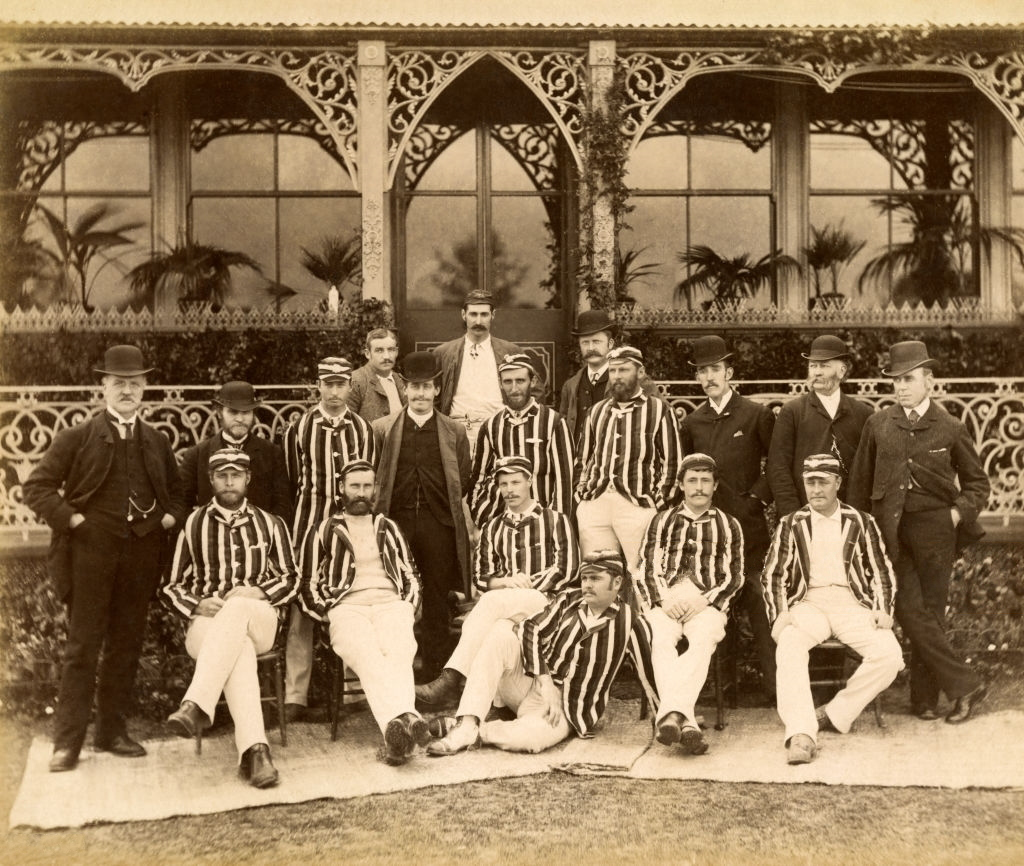
The 1886 Australia national cricket team

The Australian cricket team in England in 1886 played 27 first-class matches including 3 Tests which were all won by England.

== Test match summary ==
=== First Test ===
5–7 July 1886
Scorecard

Australia	v	England
205 (137.1 overs); SP Jones 87; G Ulyett 4/46 (36.1 overs)		223 (157.2 overs); WW Read 51; FR Spofforth 4/82 (53 overs)
123 (118.3 overs); HJH Scott 47; RG Barlow 7/44 (52 overs)		107/6 (77.2 overs); RG Barlow 30; G Giffen 2/31 (24 overs)

England won by 4 wickets
Old Trafford, Manchester
Umpires: CK Pullin and J West

- Australia won the toss and elected to bat.
- GA Lohmann (ENG) made his Test debut.

=== Second Test ===
19–21 July 1886
Scorecard

England	v	Australia
353 (259 overs); A Shrewsbury 164; FR Spofforth 4/73 (56 overs)		121 (82.3 overs); HJH Scott 30; J Briggs 5/29 (34 overs)
		126 (f/o) (111.1 overs); GE Palmer 48; J Briggs 6/45 (38.1 overs)

England won by an innings and 106 runs
Lord's, London
Umpires: FH Farrands and CK Pullin

- England won the toss and elected to bat.

=== Third Test ===
12–14 August 1886
Scorecard

England	v	Australia
434 (304.1 overs); WG Grace 170; FR Spofforth 4/65 (30.1 overs)		68 (60.2 overs); GE Palmer 15; GA Lohmann 7/36 (30.2 overs)
		149 (f/o) (97 overs); G Giffen 47; GA Lohmann 5/68 (37 overs)

England won by an innings and 217 runs
The Oval, London
Umpires: RP Carpenter and FH Farrands

- England won the toss and elected to bat.
- J McIlwraith (AUS) made his Test debut.

== Annual reviews ==
- James Lillywhite's Cricketers' Annual (Red Lilly) 1887
- Wisden Cricketers' Almanack 1887
