= Tup Scott =

Australian cricketer (1858–1910)

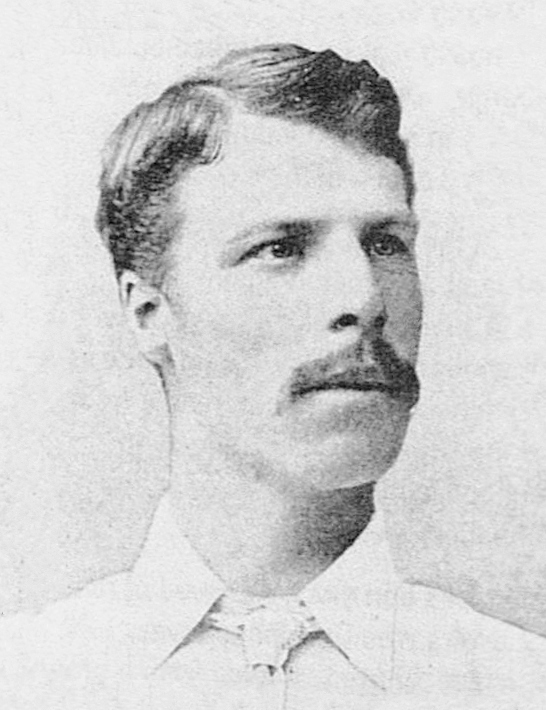

Personal information
- Full name: Henry James Herbert Scott
- Born: 26 December 1858; Toorak, Victoria, Australia
- Died: 23 September 1910 (aged 51); Scone, New South Wales, Australia
- Nickname: Tup
- Height: 1.75 m (5 ft 9 in)
- Batting: Right-handed
- Bowling: Right-arm fast medium
- Role: Middle-order batsman

International information
- National side: Australia
- Test debut (cap 31): 10 July 1884 v England
- Last Test: 14 August 1886 v England

Domestic team information
- Years: Team
- 1878–1886: Victoria

Career statistics
Competition	Test	First-class
Matches	8	85
Runs scored	359	2,863
Batting average	27.61	22.72
100s/50s	1/1	4/14
Top score	102	123
Balls bowled	28	1,108
Wickets	0	18
Bowling average	–	27.44
5 wickets in innings	–	1
10 wickets in match	–	0
Best bowling	–	6/33
Catches/stumpings	8/–	57/–
- Source: CricketArchive, 24 October 2012

Henry James Herbert "Tup" Scott (26 December 1858 – 23 September 1910) was an Australian cricketer who played first-class cricket for Victoria and Test cricket for Australia. He acquired his nickname during a cricket tour of England in 1884 from his love of London sightseeing tours which cost two pence or "tuppence".

Scott was born in Toorak, Victoria, and soon moved to Melbourne, where he began to play cricket at a high level. He made his first-class debut in February 1878, and was soon chosen for the Australian team. By the time of the 1886 Australian tour of England, he had been appointed captain, but he remained in England at the tour's conclusion to pursue a career in medicine, and played no further first-class cricket. Scott began as a right arm fast-medium bowler and achieved his best analysis of six wickets for 33 runs on his first-class debut. But it was as a middle order batsman that Scott developed into an international player. He scored four first-class centuries, including one for Australia when he scored 102 at The Oval in 1884. Scott assumed the leadership of the Australian team following a dispute between English and Australian authorities which resulted in the dropping of Billy Murdoch, the Australian captain. However, the team which he led was afflicted by internal disputes over which he could exert no authority, and the tour was unsuccessful.

Scott returned to Australia as a qualified medical practitioner. He retired from cricket and set up a practice in the rural New South Wales town of Scone, where he later served as mayor and chief magistrate. He died at Scone of typhoid in 1910.

== Early years ==
Scott was born at Toorak, Victoria on 26 December 1858 to John and Elizabeth Scott. His father was secretary of the Melbourne Gas and Coke Company. Scott was educated at Wesley College and the University of Melbourne, from which he and two of his brothers graduated in medicine.

Scott was spotted by Sam Cosstick, an influential figure in Victorian cricket, when playing for his college aged thirteen; Cosstick remarked: "That little nipper will make a good 'un!" Scott played successfully for St Kilda Cricket Club as a schoolboy. Fully grown, Scott was 5 ft 9 in (175 cm) tall and weighed 11 st 8 lb (73.6 kg).

== First-class career ==
=== Victoria: 1878–1884 ===
Scott's obituary in Wisden Cricketers' Almanack said that "in his young days he was a fast bowler, but his reputation as a cricketer was gained entirely as a batsman". Scott made his first-class debut at the age of nineteen in February 1878 when he played for Victoria against New South Wales at the Association Ground (Note: The Sydney Cricket Ground was known as the Association Ground until 1893–94 and renamed ahead of the 1894–95 season) in Sydney. He scored just 2 and 0 but distinguished himself as a fast-medium bowler in the New South Wales second innings by taking a career-best six for 33. His next match for the colony was not until March 1882 when he played against South Australia at the Adelaide Oval. South Australia won by 31 runs. Scott, who opened Victoria's first innings, scored 9 and 10.

Wisden recorded that Scott's potential was first noticed in 1882 and he became a Victorian regular in the 1882–83 season. In the opening match of the 1883–84 season, Scott scored 114 not out against New South Wales at the Melbourne Cricket Ground and Wisden said this innings "was the main cause of his being given a place in the Australian team that came to England in 1884".

=== 1884 tour of England ===
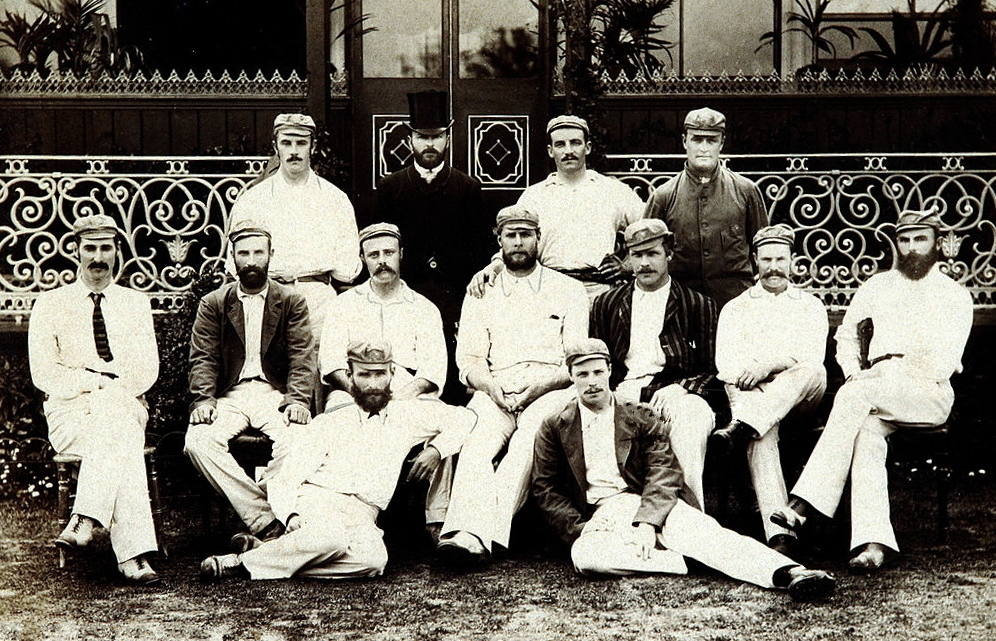
Tup Scott pictured front right with the 1884 Australian cricket team

Scott had a very successful tour in 1884 with Australian team, under the captaincy of Billy Murdoch. In its summary of the tour, Wisden said: "Scott (who had not visited England before) proved an emphatic success". Scott made only 12 in the First Test at Old Trafford but achieved large scores in the other two. In the Second Test at Lord's, he scored 75 and 31 not out. Wisden recorded that "Scott once more proved how well he merited a place in the team. He was admirably supported by Boyle, and before parting was effected 69 runs were put on for the last wicket. Scott played cool, confident, skilful cricket.". Commenting on Australia's second innings, Wisden said: "On the last day Scott made a gallant effort to save the innings defeat, but without avail. He was highest scorer in both innings of the Australians, and his total of 105 for once out was a very fine performance". When caught for 75 in the first innings, he became the first player to be dismissed by a substitute; the catcher was his own captain, Murdoch, who was fielding as a substitute for England.

Scott scored 102 in the Third Test at The Oval. Wisden stated: "Scott was batting three hours and a half for his 102, out of 207 put on while he was in". His partnership of 207 with Murdoch for the third wicket was the first time a partnership of 200 had been achieved in a Test.

Among his other successes on the tour, Scott scored 82 not out against the Gentlemen at Lord's, 79 against Gloucestershire at Clifton College Close Ground and 65 in the second match against Gloucestershire at College Ground, Cheltenham. He appeared in 31 first-class matches on the tour, scoring 966 runs in 50 innings at an average of 23.00 with the one century and six half-centuries. He held 24 catches and took 3 wickets. During the tour, Scott acquired his nickname "Tup" through his love of London open-topped bus rides, each of which cost two pence, or "tuppence".

=== Victoria: 1884–1886 ===
Having returned to Melbourne in November 1884, Scott became embroiled in a dispute between the Australian team and a touring English team formed by James Lillywhite, Alfred Shaw and Arthur Shrewsbury. On 1 November, while the returning Australian team was still at sea, the Australian newspaper The Age reported that the English tourists "are not desirous of playing any matches in Australia against Murdoch's Eleven". When the English team played Victoria later in the month, Scott was one of seven Victorians, all members of Murdoch's team, who refused to take part. Consequently, the Victorian Cricket Association suspended the players pending an inquiry. When the English team travelled to Sydney, the New South Wales contingent of Murdoch's team also refused to play. It was not until 27 December that details of the dispute became generally known when The Age published correspondence between Lillywhite and the Australians' manager George Alexander which revealed a disagreement about the share of the gate money from the first two Tests to be played in January and February. Members of the 1884 Australian team, including Scott, made up the entire home side in the First Test but boycotted the second match, forcing Australia replace the entire team. On 17 January 1885, The Australasian published an account written by Scott, Joey Palmer, Harry Boyle and Jack Blackham of alleged "underhand dealings" by John Conway who was representing the English team's interests.

In late February, Scott played in the third Test. Australia won by six runs but Scott failed. He was not selected for either of the two remaining Tests and played no further first-class cricket that season.

Before the 1885–86 season began, the Melbourne Cricket Club announced that it was to send an Australian team to England in 1886. It was the first time the club had formed a touring party and the historian Chris Harte says it did so largely on the advice of Lord Harris, who convinced them a team with official club backing would be "far better received in England". At a meeting of the Melbourne Cricket Club on 12 December 1885, it was announced that thirteen players including Tup Scott had agreed to form "the strongest all-round team available in the colonies".

Scott played three first-class matches in the 1885–86 season. He began with 111 at the Melbourne Cricket Ground for Victoria against New South Wales, which helped his team win by an innings and 69 runs. His good form continued with 74 for an Australian team against his home colony, the tourists winning by 10 wickets. But in the final match, playing for Victoria against New South Wales at the Association Ground, he was dismissed for 16 and 0 as his team lost by 150 runs. While playing cricket that season, Scott completed the third year of his medical course at Melbourne University.

=== 1886 tour of England ===
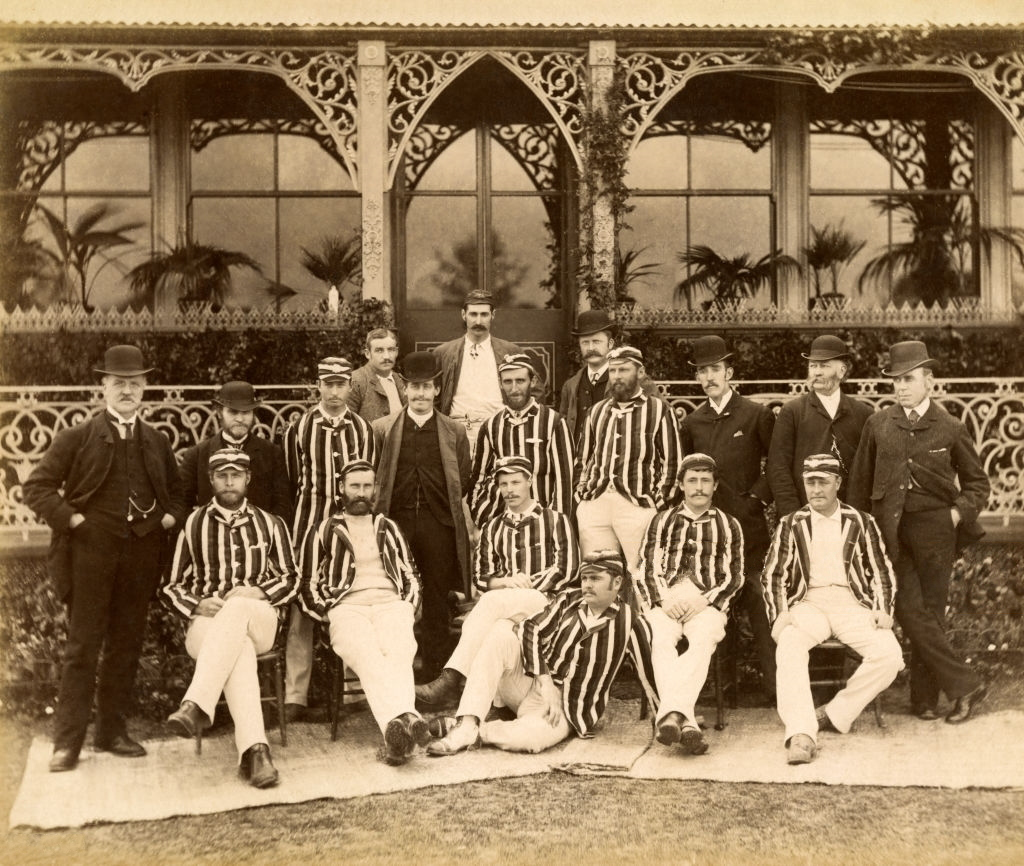
Tup Scott pictured 3rd left (front row) with the 1886 Australian cricket team

The Melbourne Club was aware that, in the aftermath of the 1884–85 dispute, there were proposals in England to ban certain Australian players. The club decided to omit former captain Murdoch, Bannerman and Percy McDonnell from the team. This move caused widespread criticism, especially as Boyle, Tom Horan and Hugh Massie had already declared themselves unavailable. Scott, now aged 27, was chosen as captain. In Wisden's view: "It was a misfortune for Scott ... Under happier circumstances he might have got on well, but fortune was against him". Harte comments that it was Scott's "misfortune in a way to be following the blazing success of Murdoch's captaincy with a team that looked good on paper but was, in fact, growing jaded".

The tour was a great disappointment for Australian cricket. The team won only nine of its 39 matches and were soundly beaten in the Test series, but the real difficulty was the indiscipline of some players. According to Wisden, quarrels began among the players during the opening match at Sheffield Park, Uckfield and Scott had "neither the strength of character nor the experience as a leader that the difficulties of his position demanded". Scott and the team manager Ben Wardill spent a lot of time adjudicating quarrels and the stress of the captaincy impacted Scott's performances as a batsman. The 1887 edition of Wisden bemoaned the absence of Murdoch, saying: "W. L. Murdoch, who was chief in the field of the three teams of 1880, 1882, and 1884, may not have exhibited all the qualities which go to make up that rare and valuable being, an ideal captain – but he certainly had a larger experience and a stronger will than the gentleman who, with the best of intentions, and the greatest sincerity of purpose, led the team of 1886".

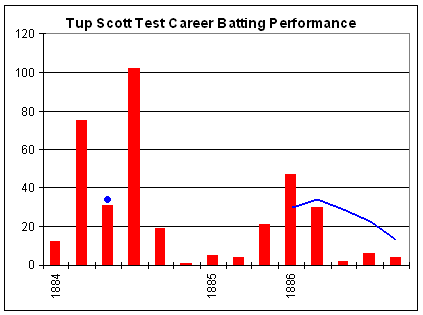
Tup Scott's Test career batting graph.

England won the First Test at Old Trafford by four wickets. Wisden called it a "remarkable match" and described Scott's innings of 47 in the second innings as "capital batting". This was the closest Australia came to beating England in the series and Wisden said "they made a splendid fight of it". In the Second Test at Lord's, Australia had two low totals and were well beaten, Wisden remarking that "the Australians thus suffered a most crushing and decisive defeat by an innings and 106 runs". Wisden commented on the poor form of the Australians in the third Test which meant "England was left with another decisive victory, by an innings and 217 runs". W. G. Grace made his highest Test score of 170 after he was dropped by Scott when he had scored only six runs. Scott made only 110 runs in his six Test innings at 18.33 including his highest score of 47 at Old Trafford. But Australia's batting was poor with only one half-century scored for the team in the series.

Scott played some good innings and totalled 1,278 runs on the tour at an average of 22.03 with a best score of 123 against Middlesex at Lord's. In an innings of 67 not out against Yorkshire at Bramall Lane, Sheffield he scored 22 runs in one four-ball over from Saul Wade, which is still the record for the most runs scored of a four-ball over in first-class cricket history.

=== Retirement ===
At the end of the tour, Scott decided to remain in England to complete his qualification as a medical practitioner. On his return to Australia, he went into medical practice and retired from cricket. Years later, Scott was asked if he would have liked to continue playing and he replied: "I have captained Australia and hit a Test century. Many would have liked two such honours as these". Scott made 85 first-class appearances of which only 17 were in Australia; he played 68 times on his two tours of England.

The cricket writer Ray Robinson suggests that Scott's batting "was noted for grit rather than gaiety" but he did sometimes reveal an adventurous streak as shown when he landed a ball from A. G. Steel onto the pavilion roof at The Oval and by his assault on Saul Wade's bowling at Bramall Lane. In 1884, England found that Scott was the hardest man to bowl out in the Australian team.

== Later years ==
Scott began his medical career in June 1888 as a surgeon at the mines in the East Australian Cordillera. In July, he married Mary Minnie Mickle at St Kilda, Victoria and they eventually settled at Scone, New South Wales; Robinson wrote that Scott "undertook the life of a pioneer country doctor with a spirit service that won him even greater esteem than (his) Test deeds". Scott is said to have dealt with unpaid accounts by ruling them out of his books. He was elected mayor of Scone and held office for three years, also serving as the town's chief magistrate.

On 23 September 1910, Tup Scott died of typhoid. When a new hospital opened in Scone, the townspeople named it the Scott Memorial Hospital.

Preceded by Tom Horan	Australian Test cricket captains 1886	Succeeded by Percy McDonnell
