= International cricket in 1894–95 =

International cricket season

The 1894–95 international cricket season was from September 1894 to April 1895.

== Season overview ==
International tours
Start date	Home team	Away team	Results [Matches]			
Start date	Home team	Away team	Test	ODI	FC	LA
14 December 1894	Australia	England	2–3 [5]	—	—	—
1 February 1895	New Zealand	Fiji	—	—	0–0 [1]	—
30 March 1895	Jamaica	England	—	—	1–2 [3]	—

== December ==
=== England in Australia ===
The Ashes Test match series
No.	Date	Home captain	Away captain	Venue	Result
Test No: 42	14–20 December	Jack Blackham	Andrew Stoddart	Sydney Cricket Ground, Sydney	England by 10 runs
Test No: 43	29 December–3 January	George Giffen	Andrew Stoddart	Melbourne Cricket Ground, Melbourne	England by 24 runs
Test No: 44	11–15 January	George Giffen	Andrew Stoddart	Adelaide Oval, Adelaide	Australia by 382 runs
Test No: 45	1–4 February	George Giffen	Andrew Stoddart	Sydney Cricket Ground, Sydney	Australia by an innings and 147 runs
Test No: 46	1–6 March	George Giffen	Andrew Stoddart	Melbourne Cricket Ground, Melbourne	England by 6 wickets
