= International cricket in 1886 =

International cricket season

The 1886 international cricket season was from April 1886 to September 1886. The season consisted of a single international tour, visiting with Australia England for The Ashes series.

== Season overview ==
International tours
| Start date | Home team | Away team | Results [Matches] | | | |
| Start date | Home team | Away team | Test | ODI | FC | LA |
|---|---|---|---|---|---|---|
| 5 July 1886 | England | Australia | 3–0 [3] | — | — | — |

== July ==
=== Australia in England ===
The Ashes Test match series
| No. | Date | Home captain | Away captain | Venue | Result |
|---|---|---|---|---|---|
| Test 22 | 5–7 July | Allan Steel | Tup Scott | Old Trafford Cricket Ground, Manchester | England by 4 wickets |
| Test 23 | 19–21 July | Allan Steel | Tup Scott | Lord's, London | England by an innings and 106 runs |
| Test 24 | 12–14 August | Allan Steel | Tup Scott | Kennington Oval, London | England by an innings and 217 runs |
