= Australian cricket team in England in 1890 =

International cricket tour

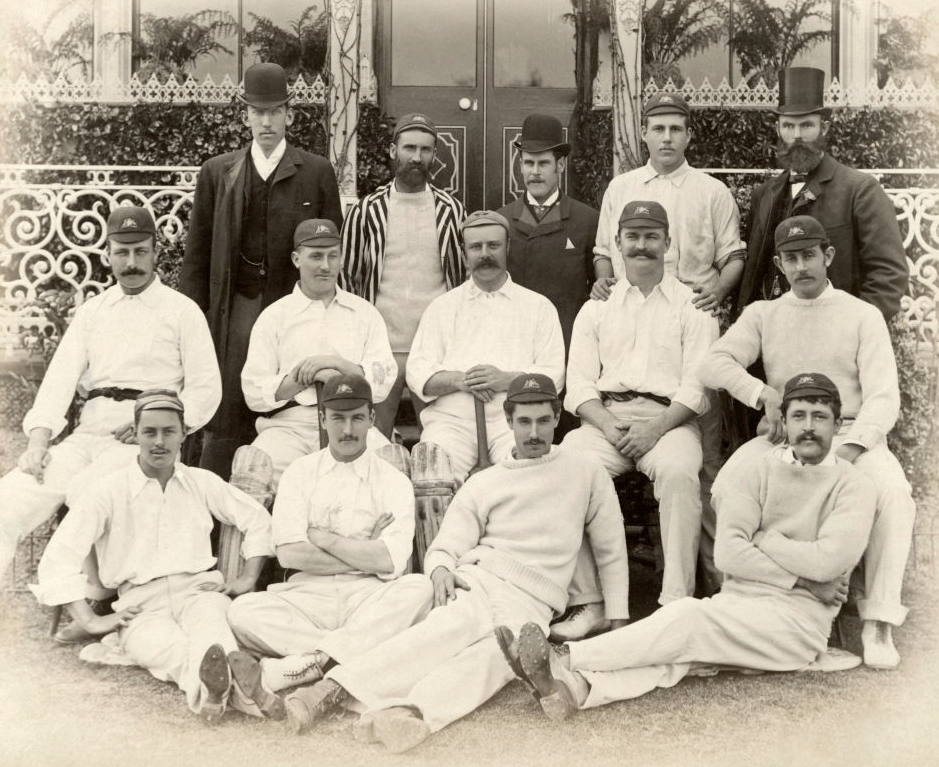
The 1890 Australian national cricket team

The Australian cricket team played 34 first-class matches in England in 1890, including two Test matches (a third Test was abandoned due to bad weather without play ever starting).

== Test series summary ==
England won the Test series 2–0.

=== First Test ===
21–23 July 1890
Scorecard

Australia	v	England
132 (86 overs); JJ Lyons 55; W Attewell 4/42 (32 overs)		173 (110.1 overs); G Ulyett 74; JJ Lyons 5/30 (20.1 overs)
176 (140.2 overs); JE Barrett 67*; GA Lohmann 3/28 (29 overs)		137/3 (75 overs); WG Grace 75*; JJ Ferris 2/42 (25 overs)

England won by 7 wickets
Lord's, London
Umpires: A Hill and CK Pullin

- Australia won the toss and elected to bat.
- JE Barrett, SE Gregory, PC Charlton, EJK Burn and H Trumble (all AUS), and G MacGregor (ENG) made their Test debuts.

=== Second Test ===
11–12 August 1890
Scorecard

Australia	v	England
92 (65.2 overs); GHS Trott 39; F Martin 6/50 (27 overs)		100 (55 overs); W Gunn 32; JJ Ferris 4/25 (25 overs)
102 (60.2 overs); GHS Trott 25; F Martin 6/52 (30.2 overs)		95/8 (51 overs); JM Read 35; JJ Ferris 5/49 (23 overs)

England won by 2 wickets
The Oval, London
Umpires: CK Pullin and J Street

- Australia won the toss and elected to bat.
- The match finished on the second day.
  J Cranston, JW Sharpe and F Martin (all ENG) made their Test debuts.

=== Third Test ===
25–27 August 1890
Scorecard

England	v	Australia

Match abandoned
Old Trafford, Manchester

- No toss.

== Annual reviews ==
- James Lillywhite's Cricketers' Annual (Red Lilly) 1891
- Wisden Cricketers' Almanack 1891
