= International cricket in 1891–92 =

International cricket

The 1891–92 international cricket season was from September 1891 to April 1892.

== Season overview ==
International tours
Start date	Home team	Away team	Results [Matches]			
Start date	Home team	Away team	Test	ODI	FC	LA
1 January 1892	Australia	England	2–1 [3]	—	—	—
19 March 1892	South Africa	England	0–1 [1]	—	—	—

== January ==
=== England in Australia ===
The Ashes Test match series
No.	Date	Home captain	Away captain	Venue	Result
Test No: 35	1–6 January	Jack Blackham	W. G. Grace	Melbourne Cricket Ground, Melbourne	Australia by 54 runs
Test No: 36	29 January–3 February	Jack Blackham	W. G. Grace	Sydney Cricket Ground, Sydney	Australia by 72 runs
Test No: 38	24–28 March	Jack Blackham	W. G. Grace	Adelaide Oval, Leeds	England by an innings and 230 runs

== March ==
=== England in South Africa ===
Test match series
No.	Date	Home captain	Away captain	Venue	Result
Test 37	19–22 March	William Milton	Walter Read	Newlands Cricket Ground, Cape Town	England by an innings and 189 runs
