= International cricket in 1893 =

International cricket season

The 1893 international cricket season was from April 1893 to September 1893. The season consists with a single international tour.

== Season overview ==
International tours
Start date	Home team	Away team	Results [Matches]			
Start date	Home team	Away team	Test	ODI	FC	LA
17 July 1893	England	Australia	1–0 [3]	—	—	—
August 1893	Netherlands	Yorkshire	—	—	1–8 [9]	—

== July ==
=== Australia in England ===
The Ashes Test match series
No.	Date	Home captain	Away captain	Venue	Result
Test No: 39	17–19 July	Andrew Stoddart	Jack Blackham	Lord's, London	Match drawn
Test No: 40	14–16 August	W. G. Grace	Jack Blackham	Kennington Oval, London	England by an innings and 43 runs
Test No: 41	24–26 August	W. G. Grace	Jack Blackham	Old Trafford Cricket Ground, Manchester	Match drawn
