= George Alexander (Australian cricketer) =

Australian cricketer and team manager (1851–1930)

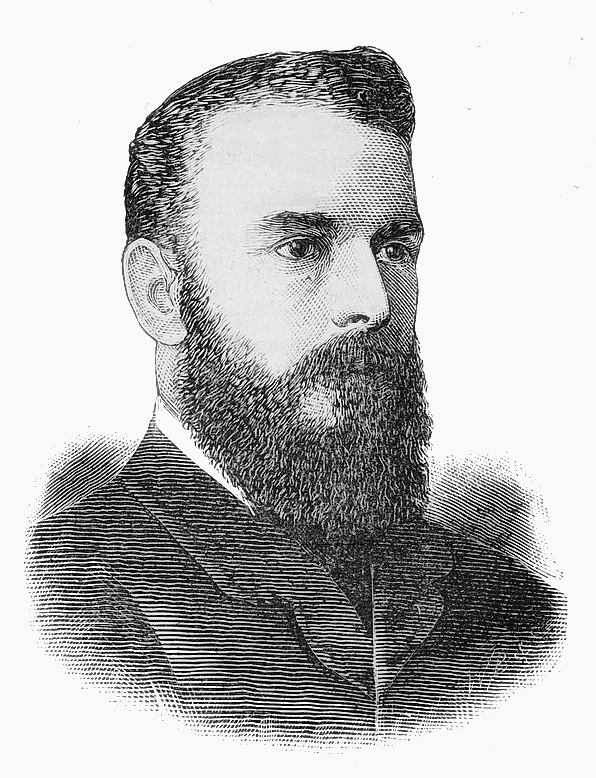

Personal information
- Born: 22 April 1851; Fitzroy, Victoria, Australia
- Died: 6 November 1930 (aged 79); Richmond, Victoria, Australia
- Batting: Right-handed
- Bowling: Right-arm fast roundarm

International information
- National side: Australia
- Test debut (cap 18): 6 September 1880 v England
- Last Test: 12 December 1884 v England

Career statistics
Competition	Tests	First-class
Matches	2	24
Runs scored	52	466
Batting average	13.00	15.53
100s/50s	0/0	0/2
Top score	33	75
Balls bowled	168	1754
Wickets	2	34
Bowling average	46.50	17.85
5 wickets in innings	0	1
10 wickets in match	0	0
Best bowling	2/69	6/57
Catches/stumpings	2/0	16/0

George Alexander (22 April 1851 – 6 November 1930) was an Australian cricketer and team manager. He played for Victoria and for Australia. Alexander's place of birth is variously given as Britwell Salome, Oxfordshire, England or Fitzroy, Victoria; the latter appearing in Alexander's obituary in the 1931 edition of Wisden Cricketers' Almanack.

== Cricket career ==
Alexander was a forceful bat and a fast roundarm bowler, who also acted as the manager of the Australian teams that toured England under Billy Murdoch in 1880 and 1884. He also managed the England tour of 1882–83 under Ivo Bligh that went to Australia to retrieve The Ashes.

In 1880, in addition to his management duties, Alexander was one of the leading bowlers of the team that visited other colonies as well as England. On the tour as a whole, he took 109 wickets at an average of nine runs each. He played in the first Test match on English soil at The Oval, took two wickets and with Murdoch added 52 runs for the ninth wicket, which helped avoid an innings defeat. He played a second Test match four years later at the Adelaide Oval, but did not take a wicket.

== Later years and death ==
According to the Preston Leader, Alexander was a keen lawn bowls player as captain of Northcote Bowling Club. In 1922, he had an unexpected reunion with a fellow member of Murdoch's touring team of 1884 in W. H. Cooper. The Victorian Bowling Association final was held at Alphington where Alexander was helping out. The pair had not seen each other for nearly 40 years, but were suddenly reunited when Cooper arrived as the scorer for Middle Park.

The Preston Leader (and Melbourne newspapers) noted the death in a private hospital in Richmond on November 6, 1930 at 78 years of age of George Alexander, describing him as "a resident of Northcote for over 60 years" and living at 'Terracedale', 3 McLachlan Street at the time of his demise. Outside of cricket, he had been co-proprietor of the Preston Abattoirs and before that, as a contractor, he was involved in construction of the cable tramway system along St Kilda Road. Alexander was interred in the Melbourne General Cemetery; Jack Blackham and W. H. Cooper were amongst the pallbearers.
