= John McIlwraith (cricketer) =

Australian cricketer (1857–1938)

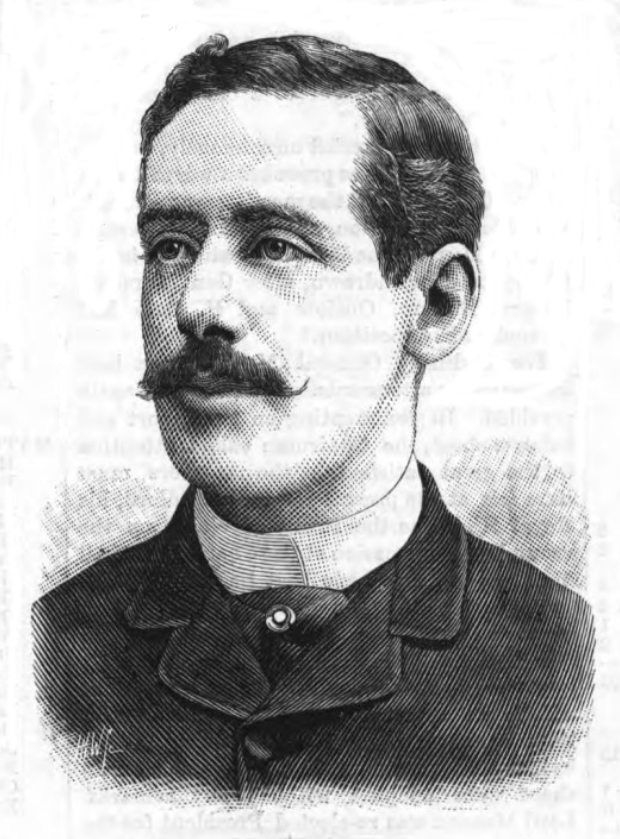

Personal information
- Full name: John McIlwraith
- Born: 7 September 1857; Collingwood, Melbourne, Colony of Victoria
- Died: 5 July 1938 (aged 80); Camberwell, Melbourne, Victoria
- Batting: Right-handed

International information
- National side: Australia
- Only Test (cap 43): 12 August 1886 v England

Career statistics
Competition	Test	First-class
Matches	1	44
Runs scored	9	1468
Batting average	4.50	24.06
100s/50s	0/0	2/6
Top score	7	133
Catches/stumpings	1/–	24/–
- Source: Cricinfo, 28 April 2019

John McIlwraith (7 September 1857 – 5 July 1938) was an Australian cricketer who played in one Test match in 1886.

== Early life and business career ==
Jack McIlwraith was the son of John McIlwraith, the co-founder of the McIlwraith McEacharn shipping company and Mayor of Melbourne in 1873–74, and the nephew of Thomas McIlwraith, who was several times Premier of Queensland. Jack was educated at Scotch College, Melbourne. He worked with McIlwraith McEacharn, managing the Melbourne office while still in his twenties, and later became a director. He was also involved with the company's lead-manufacturing concern.

== Cricket career ==
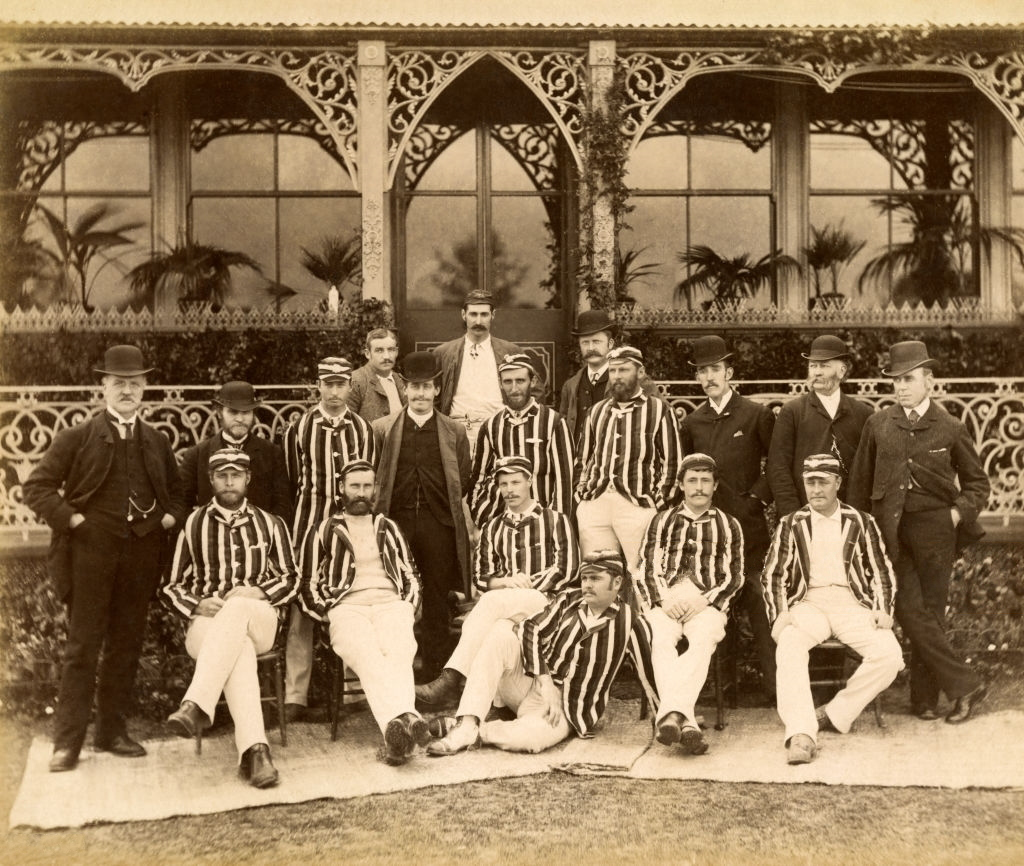
McIlwraith pictured 4th left (middle row) with 1886 Australian team

McIlwraith played for Melbourne Cricket Club, scoring more than 1500 runs in the 1883–84 season. He was selected to play for Victoria in 1884–85. He was the outstanding batsman in the short Australian first-class season in 1885–86, scoring 315 runs at an average of 78.75, with two centuries; only one other batsman scored a century, and the next most successful batsman made 201 runs. He made his highest first-class score of 133 in the first match of the season, an innings victory for Victoria over New South Wales.

He toured England in 1886 with the Australian team, but was only moderately successful in a team that lost all three Tests. He was handicapped on English pitches by the lack of a sound defence, and made only 520 runs at an average of 16.25. He improved towards the end of the tour and played in the Third Test, but scored only 2 and 7 in an innings defeat. He continued playing for Victoria until 1889, when he retired to concentrate on the family business.

McIlwraith was also a leading Australian rules footballer for Melbourne in the Victorian Football Association (VFA) during the 1880s.

== Personal life ==
McIlwraith married Florence Edith Osborn in June 1885. When he died on 5 July 1938 he left no family, his wife and only daughter having pre-deceased him.

== Sources ==
- Atkinson, G. (1982) Everything you ever wanted to know about Australian rules football but couldn't be bothered asking, The Five Mile Press: Melbourne. ISBN 0 86788 009 0
