= Sheffield Park and Garden =

National Trust owned landscape garden in East Sussex, England

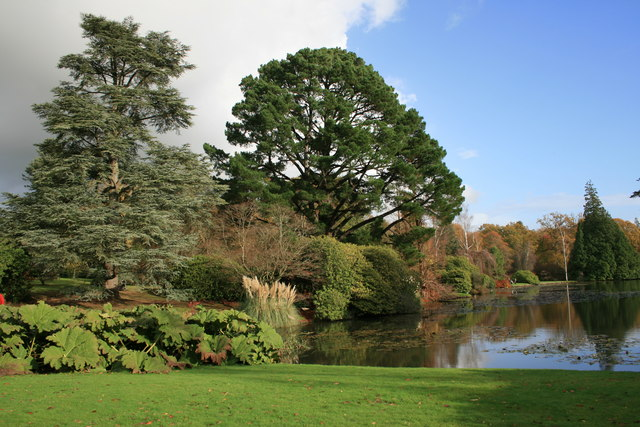

- Location within East Sussex
- Type: Landscape garden
- Coordinates: 50°59′57.9″N 0°0′46.5″E
- Area: 450 acres (180 ha)
- Owner: National Trust
- Collections: Ghent Azaleas
- Website: https://www.nationaltrust.org.uk/sheffield-park-and-garden

Sheffield Park and Garden is an informal landscape garden five miles east of Haywards Heath, in East Sussex, England. It was originally laid out in the 18th century by Capability Brown, and further developed as a woodland garden in the early 20th century by its then owner, Arthur Gilstrap Soames. It is now owned by the National Trust.

== History ==
The estate is first mentioned in the Domesday Book of 1086, where it is listed as part of the Rape of Pevensey, an area given by William the Conqueror to his half-brother, Robert, Count of Mortain. In August 1538, Thomas Howard, 3rd Duke of Norfolk, entertained Henry VIII here.

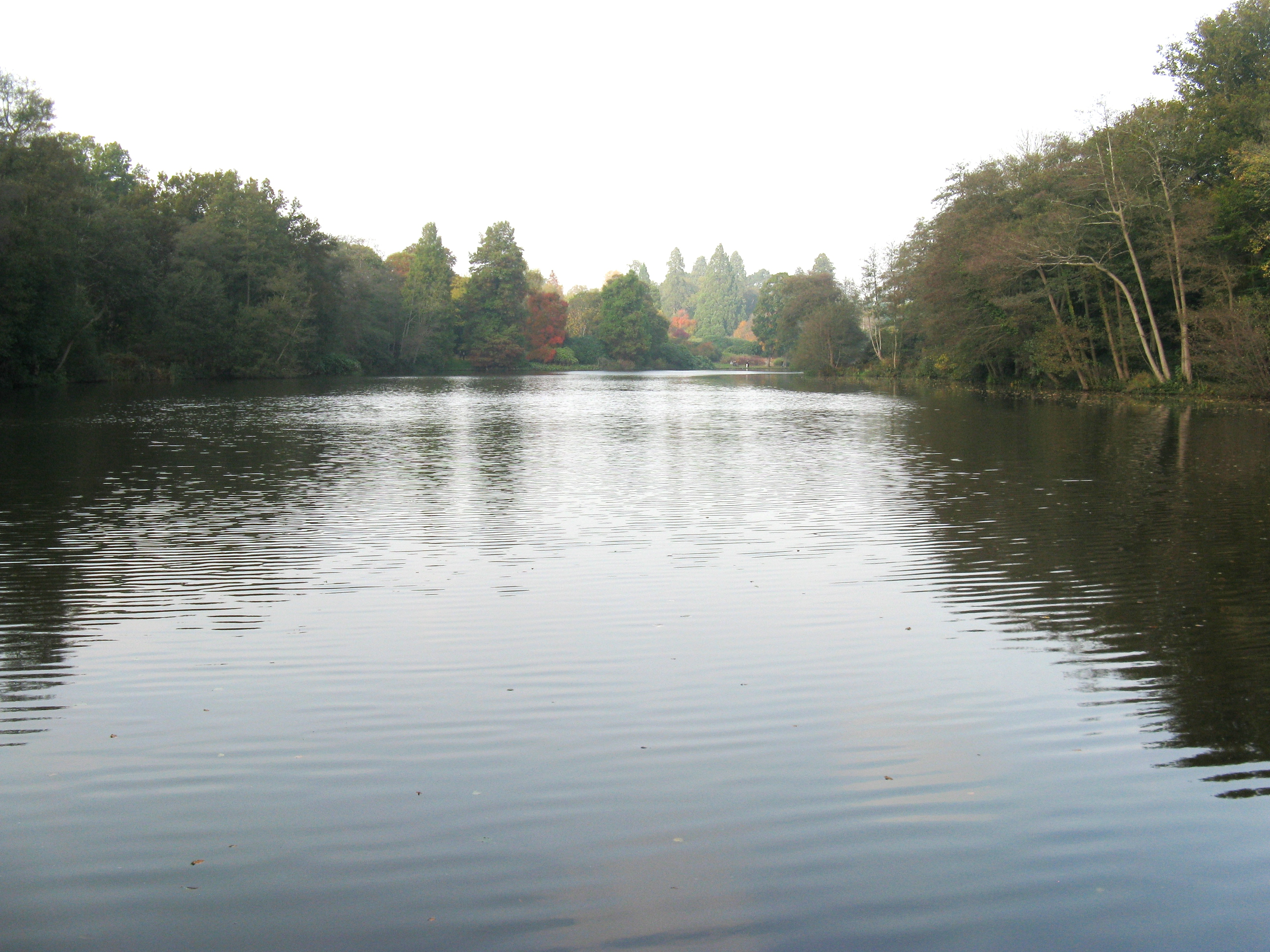
Lower Woman's Way Pond

In 1769, the estate was sold to aspiring politician John Holroyd. He was created Baron Sheffield in 1781, where after the estate was known as "Sheffield Place". Holroyd lived there with his wife Abigail Way, and spent a fortune on his house and estate: James Wyatt remodelled the house in the fashionable Gothic style, and Capability Brown was consulted and visited the site in 1775 and on subsequent occasions. According to Dorothy Stroud, Brown undertook work there in 1776. Whilst there are few written records of Brown's work, it is likely that he divided the lake into the Upper and Lower Women's Way Ponds.

Often regarded as Brown's successor, there is a surviving sketch by Humphry Repton of the park, however Repton's letters record that he did not formally deliver suggestions in one his 'Red Books. Nevertheless, according to Edward Hyams, Repton undertook work in the park in 1789.

In 1876 Henry Holroyd, 3rd Earl of Sheffield laid out a cricket pitch. It was used on 12 May 1884 for a cricket match between Lord Sheffield's XI and Australia. The Australian team won by an innings and 6 runs.

According to the Sussex Express, by 1885 the area to the north of the lower lake was being remodelled with the inclusion of exotic and native trees.

Arthur Gilstrap Soames purchased the estate in 1909, having visited the estate in 1899, and continued large-scale planting. He also made improvements to the house, including adding an orangery and installing plumbing and heating. Upon his death in 1934, the mansion and estate were inherited by his nephew, Arthur Granville Soames.

During the Second World War, thousands of troops were posted to Sheffield Park. Initially this included a Royal Artillery unit, as well as detachments from the Royal Signals and the Royal Army Medical Corps, and Nissen huts were sited in the garden and woods. In 1941, Canadian troops moved in, firstly the Quebecois unit, the Régiment de la Chaudière. In 1942 the house and garden became the headquarters for the Royal Canadian Artillery. The local Home Guard also trained at the park.

The impact of the presence of the military on the estate was significant, and although Soames attempted restoration work in the post-war period, he ultimately sold the estate to a property company in 1953.

In 1954, the National Trust purchased 81 hectares (200 acres) of the property, an acquisition that was limited by the funds available to the Trust at the time. In 2007 the Trust purchased an additional 100 hectares (250 acres) .

== Gardens ==
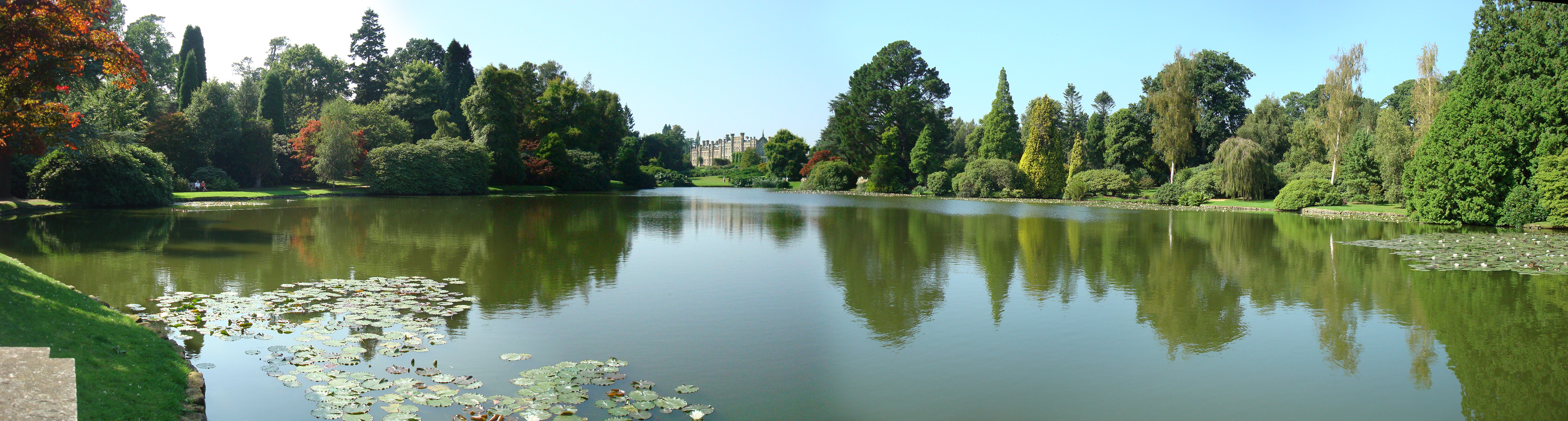
Panorama looking over ‘10-Foot Pond’ towards Sheffield Park House

The gardens originally formed part of the estate of the adjacent Sheffield Park House, a Gothic country house, which has remained in private ownership since the 1953 sale of the estate.

The gardens are particularly noted for their plantings of trees selected for autumn colour, including many Black Tupelos. It is home to the National Collection of Ghent azaleas.

In 2005, education programmes undertaken by schools on the estate, were presented to the House of Commons Education & Skills Select Committee, by the organisation Education Outside the Classroom.

== On film ==
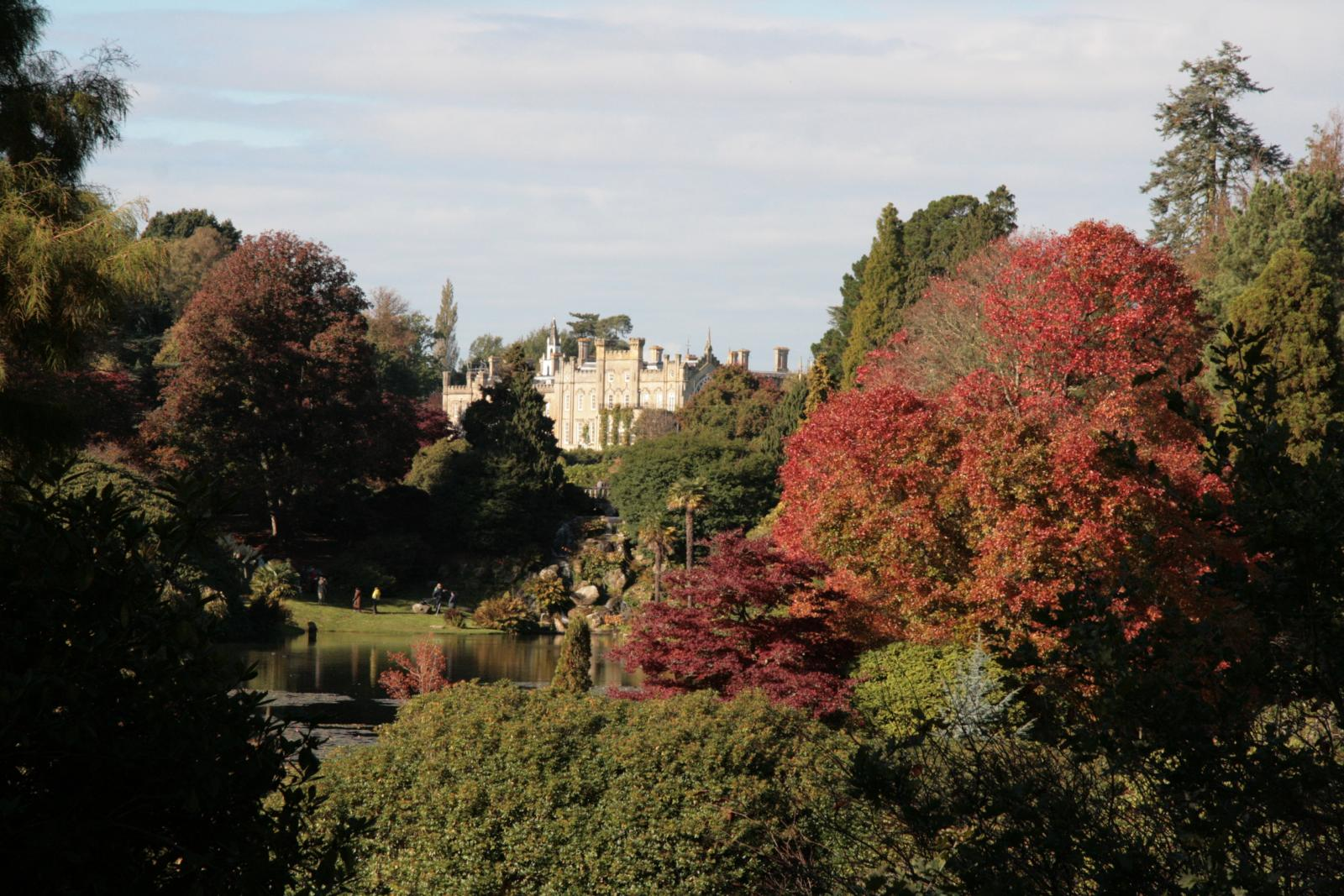
Sheffield Park and Garden - house in private ownership

The estate was used for exterior shooting in the 1961 film The Innocents, where it served as the Gothic Bly Manor, the setting of the Henry James novella The Turn of the Screw.

== See also ==
- Sheffield Park is a railway station on the heritage Bluebell Railway.
- Sheffield Park, Uckfield, the cricket ground.
