= Walter Giffen =

Australian cricketer

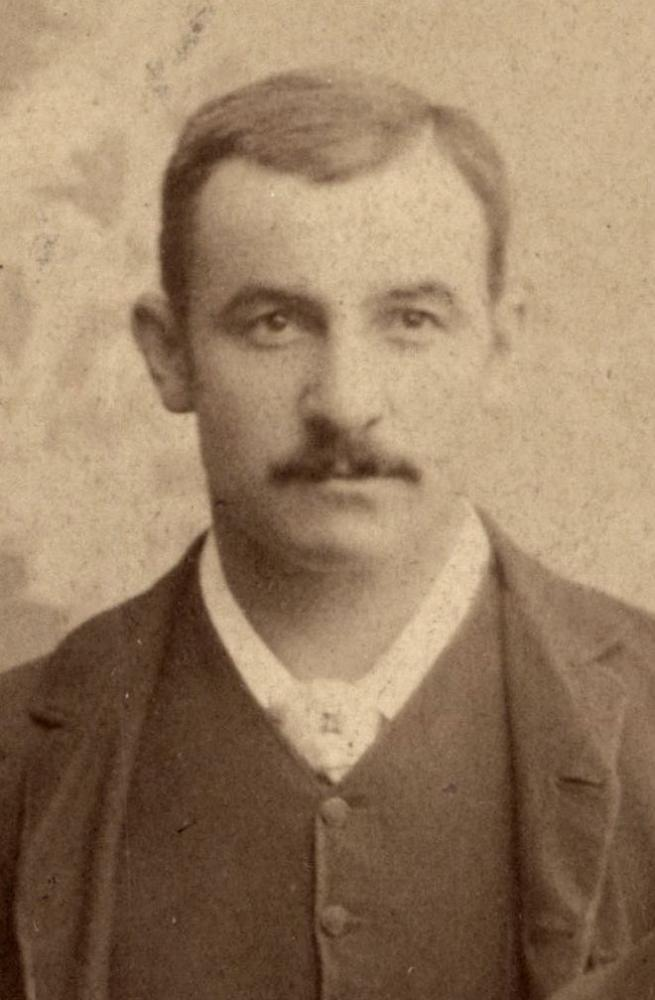

Personal information
- Full name: Walter Frank Giffen
- Born: 20 September 1861; Norwood, South Australia
- Died: 28 June 1949 (aged 87); Adelaide, South Australia
- Batting: Right-handed
- Relatives: George Giffen (brother)

International information
- National side: Australia
- Test debut (cap 50): 25 February 1887 v England
- Last Test: 24 March 1892 v England

Domestic team information
- Years: Team
- 1882/83-1901/02: South Australia

Career statistics
Competition	Test	First-class
Matches	3	47
Runs scored	11	1,178
Batting average	1.83	15.91
100s/50s	0/0	0/6
Top score	3	89
Balls bowled	–	18
Wickets	–	0
Bowling average	–	–
5 wickets in innings	–	–
10 wickets in match	–	–
Best bowling	–	–
Catches/stumpings	1/–	23/–
- Source: Cricinfo, 28 December 2019

Walter Frank Giffen (20 September 1861 – 28 June 1949) was an Australian sportsman who played in three Test cricket matches between 1887 and 1892 and played in Australian rules football for Norwood Football Club in the South Australian Football Association.

== Early life and career ==
The younger brother of leading Australian cricketer and Australian rules footballer George Giffen, Walter Giffen was born in Norwood, South Australia on 20 September 1861, to Richard Giffen, a carpenter and his wife Elizabeth (née Challand).

Giffen played alongside his brother at Norwood Football Club, where he was a member of the 1879 Norwood premiership team, and firstly at Norwood Cricket Club before they moved to Adelaide Cricket Club ahead of the 1894/95 season.

== First-class cricket career ==
Giffen made his first-class debut for South Australia on 24 March 1883, against Victoria at the Melbourne Cricket Ground, scoring a duck (out of a total of 23) and eight as South Australia lost by an innings and 98 runs. He struck better form the next season, against Victoria at Adelaide Oval, top scoring in South Australia's second innings with what was called "a faultless 89" (his highest first-class score) as South Australia lost by four wickets.

Giffen lost the tops of two fingers when he got his left hand trapped between a pair of cog-wheels in 1886 at the South Australian Gas Company's Brompton Gasworks.

Considered a sound batsman with a solid defence, Giffen's strength was his fielding in the deep and he "possessed a capital return to the wicket".

Giffen made his Test debut against England in February 1887 and was involved in a controversial event when Giffen, batting, hit the ball back to the bowler George Lohmann, who knocked the ball on the half volley to W.G. Grace at point. Grace then claimed the catch, and the unsighted umpire gave Giffen out.

In 1891 Giffen played for South Australia against the touring English side, making 65 in a total of 562, South Australia's then highest ever score, before being forced to retire hurt when his brother drove a ball straight back down the wicket, hitting the non-striker Giffen on the fingers of his right hand, injuring them so he was unable to continue his innings.

In a 1894/95 match against the touring English side, Giffen and Clem Hill added 192 for the eighth wicket, which remained the record South Australian first-class eighth wicket stand until February 2002/03 when Brad Young and Mick Miller added 222 against Queensland.

== Controversy over Australian selection ==
Giffen has been called "one of the worst Test batsmen of all time ... scores of 2, 0, 1, 3, 3 and 2 for a total of 11 runs in 3 Tests." In 1893 it was alleged that Giffen played Test cricket only because his brother George refused to play unless Walter was also selected.

The Australian media was particularly scathing of Giffen's national selection, with The Bulletin publishing a poem ridiculing him and stating "The big black spot on the selection of the Australian Eleven for England is Walter Giffen, whose proper place is in a second eleven. He is simply the brother of George Giffen and that is all."

George Giffen always denied having any influence over his brother's inclusion in Australian teams, arguing that Giffen had been picked on the strength of very good batting and when he did not have success in England, "nobody was more surprised than myself, for I had always thought that he would acquit himself well on English grounds."

== Personal ==
In 1896 it was reported that Giffen was an owner of the lucrative "Lucky Hit" gold mine near Blumberg in the Adelaide Hills as well as working in the mine. While there Giffen continued to play cricket, including scoring 150* and 150 for Blumberg Cricket Club against Mount Pleasant and Mount Torrens respectively. It was reported in 1933 he still was practising on Unley Oval and could still hit the ball hard at age 71.

He worked for the South Australian Gas Company for nearly 50 years and died at home in North Unley aged 87.

== See also ==
- List of South Australian representative cricketers

== Sources ==
- Giffen, G. (1898) With bat and ball: Twenty-five years' reminiscences of Australian and Anglo-Australian cricket, Ward, Lock & Co.: Melbourne.
- Harte, C. (1989) The History of the South Australian Cricket Association, Sports Marketing: Adelaide. ISBN 0 958 7980 3 6.
- Rae, S. (2012) W. G. Grace: A Life, Faber & Faber: London. ISBN 9780571266364.
- Stanton, H.V.L (1893) The Australian Cricket Team of 1893, Wright & Co.: London.
