= George Giffen =

Australian cricketer (1859–1927)

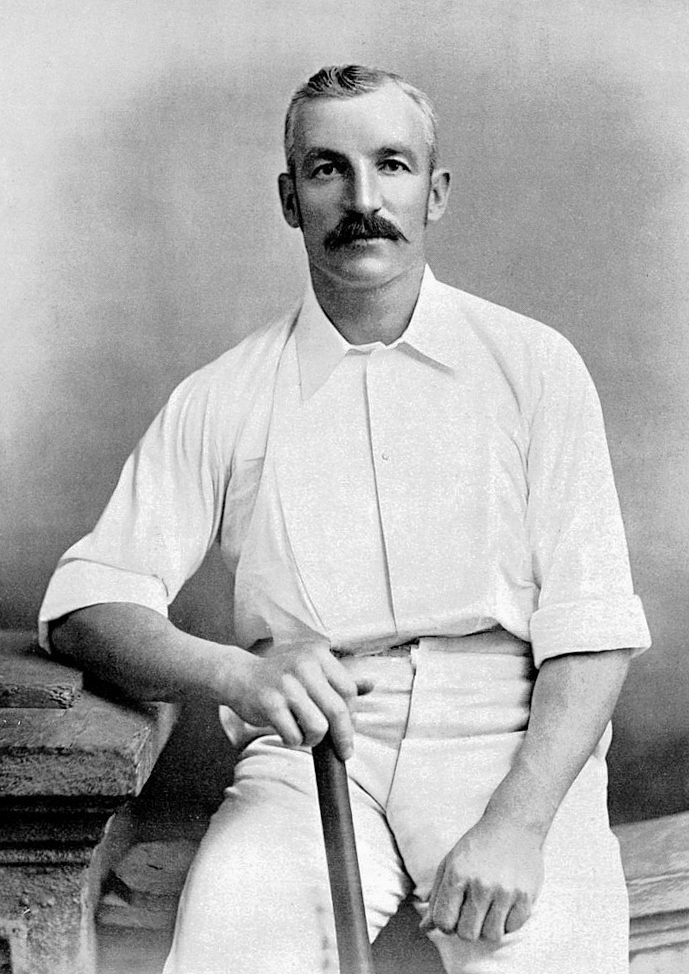
- Giffen in about 1895

Personal information
- Full name: George Giffen
- Born: 27 March 1859; Adelaide, South Australia, Australia
- Died: 29 November 1927 (aged 68); Adelaide, South Australia
- Height: 1.80 m (5 ft 11 in)
- Batting: Right-handed
- Bowling: Right-arm off spin
- Role: All-rounder
- Relatives: Walter Giffen (brother)

International information
- National side: Australia (1881–1896)
- Test debut (cap 27): 31 December 1881 v England
- Last Test: 10 August 1896 v England

Domestic team information
- Years: Team
- 1877/78–1902/03: South Australia

Career statistics
Competition	Test	First-class
Matches	31	251
Runs scored	1,238	11,758
Batting average	23.35	29.54
100s/50s	1/6	18/54
Top score	161	271
Balls bowled	6,391	46,610
Wickets	103	1,023
Bowling average	27.09	21.29
5 wickets in innings	7	95
10 wickets in match	1	30
Best bowling	7/117	10/66
Catches/stumpings	24/0	195/0
- Source: CricketArchive, 7 March 2008

George Giffen (27 March 1859 – 29 November 1927) was a cricketer who played for South Australia and Australia. An all-rounder who batted in the middle order and often opened the bowling with medium-paced off-spin, Giffen captained Australia during the 1894–95 Ashes series and was the first Australian to score 10,000 runs and take 500 wickets in first-class cricket. He was inducted into the Australian Cricket Hall of Fame on 26 February 2008. At the end of his test career in 1896 Giffen scored 1,238 runs with 1131 runs coming in the Ashes tests making him at the time the leading run getter in Ashes tests.

== Early life and career ==
Giffen was born in the Adelaide neighbourhood of Norwood in 1859 to Richard Giffen, a carpenter and his wife Elizabeth (née Challand). He started his cricket career with Norwood Cricket Club, later moving to the West Adelaide club.

In November 1877 Giffen made his first-class cricket debut, against Tasmania at the Adelaide Oval. Giffen made 47 runs, including South Australia's first runs in first-class cricket, and took four wickets for 16 runs in the Tasmanian first innings. Tasmania was forced to follow-on (bat twice in a row) and in the second innings Giffen captured another two wickets.

== Test cricket ==
=== Beginning ===
When Giffen was 22 years old he made his Test debut in Melbourne against England in 1881–82. Having just joined the postal service, Giffen was almost hesitant to ask for leave. Giffen made 30 runs before being bowled by Tom Emmett but was unable to take a wicket. Left out of the side for the Second Test in Sydney, he returned for the Third Test. Australia won the match by five wickets by Giffen made only two runs and was not given a chance to bowl. In the final Test of the series, Giffen captured his first Test wicket—William Scotton stumped by Jack Blackham for 27. He took 2/17 and, with the bat, made 14 in a drawn match. Australia won the series two Tests to nil.

Giffen was selected to tour England with the Australian team in 1882. He was moderately successful, taking 32 wickets at an average of 21.84 and making 699 runs averaging 19.02. In the celebrated match against England—later designated a Test match—Giffen made 2 runs in the first innings but was dismissed by Ted Peate for a duck in the second. Australia, through a magnificent bowling effort from Fred Spofforth and Harry Boyle, won the match by seven runs. The match was the origin of the term "The Ashes" for Test series between the two nations. A mock obituary placed in The Sporting Times lamented "the death of English cricket" and noted that "The body will be cremated and the ashes taken to Australia."

Ivo Bligh and his English team arrived in Australia in 1882–83 determined to win back "the Ashes". In the First Test at the Melbourne Cricket Ground, Giffen made 36 runs, his highest Test score to date. He followed this with his best figures with the ball, capturing 4/38 in the England second innings, helping Australia to a nine wicket victory. In the Second Test, Giffen made a "golden duck", dismissed first ball without scoring but took 4/89 in England's only innings; the English won the Test by an innings and 27 runs. Giffen was promoted to open the batting for the Third Test at the Sydney Cricket Ground, where he made 41 and 7 England won the Test by 69 runs, winning the first Ashes series 2–1.

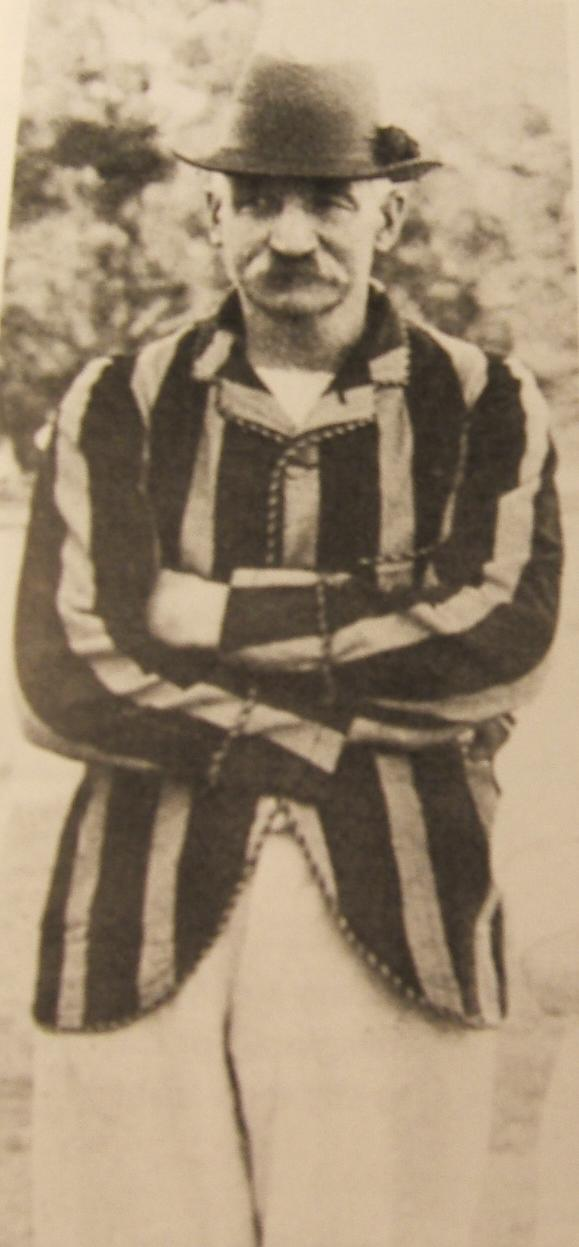
Giffen in his later years

In February 1884, Giffen became the first Australian to take all ten wickets in a first-class innings, taking 10/66 for an Australian XI against the Rest. Later that year, he was once again included in the Australian team to tour England, led by Billy Murdoch. The Australians lost the three Test series one Test to nil, but had the best of the two drawn matches. In the Second Test at Lord's, Giffen top-scored in the first innings, making 63 runs;. England won the Test by an innings and 5 runs. Giffen took 81 wickets in England at an average of 19.60, however he "tended to be expensive". His best batting performance for the tour was 118 against Lancashire; a match in which he also took a "hat-trick".

An English team led by Alfred Shaw toured Australia in 1884–85 to contest the Ashes. England won the First Test by eight wickets but the match was overshadowed by a dispute between the teams; the Australian team wished a larger share of the match profits. As a result, most of the Australian team, including Giffen, made themselves unavailable for the next two Tests. This action was unpopular with the Australian public. Charles Kingston, then South Australian Attorney-General, said "the Australian eleven would have the reputation of having sacrificed the cricketing honour of their nation to monetary considerations". Giffen and the others returned for the Fourth Test in Sydney where Australia won by eight wickets; Giffen taking 7/117 in the England first innings. England won the Fifth Test by an innings and 98 runs, retaining the Ashes in a 3–2 series victory.

=== Record breaker ===
Giffen, in a sign of things to come, made a remarkable double for South Australia against Victoria in March 1886. He captured 17 wickets for the match—including 9/91 in the first innings—and made over 100 runs. Five years later, against Victoria in November 1891, he repeated the feat even more impressively, scoring 271 runs in South Australia's innings and taking 9/96 and 7/70 in Victoria's two innings.

The Australian team touring England in 1886 did not meet with much success, losing all three Tests. Wisden Cricketers' Almanack remarked that "there is nothing to place the [Australians] on any higher standard than would have been attained by any good county team that went playing about the country". Giffen made only 60 runs for in the Tests and took only four wickets. In the other matches, however, Giffen was more successful. He made 1424 runs for the tour—only Sammy Jones scored more for the Australians—and took 154 wickets, including five wickets in an innings no less than 13 times.

Giffen was emphatically the success of the tour, and the fact that he came out first in both batting and bowling speaks volumes for his excellence. Indeed it would be impossible at the present day to name his superior as an all-round cricketer.

— Wisden Cricketers' Almanack,

Giffen became the first player in Test history to complete the double of 1000 runs and 100 wickets.

== Style and legacy ==
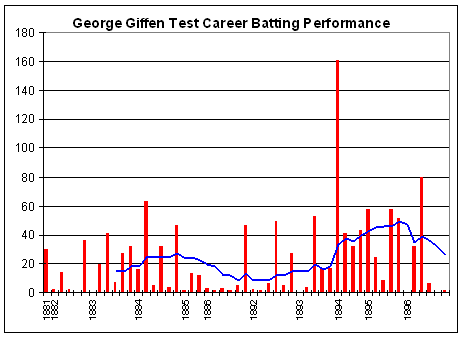
George Giffen's Test career batting graph.

His first class performances include many achievements. Nine times he scored a century and took 10 wickets in the one match. Twice he scored a century and took more than a dozen wickets. No other cricketer in the world has ever done it. He is the only bowler in the world to snare 16 wickets in a match five times. He was the first to take 17. When he was 24 he became the first bowler outside England to get a whole side out with 10–66.

He is the first Test cricketer to score 1000 runs and take 100 Test wickets. He is also the first Australian to take 1000 first-class wickets and score 10,000 runs.

Giffen's best figures were 271 runs and 16 wickets (9/96 and 7/70) for the match for South Australia vs. Victoria in 1891. In all he scored 18 first-class centuries, 4 of them doubles.

Giffen also performed well in English conditions. On each of his five tours he topped both the batting and bowling overall tour averages, yet another unique Giffen feat. The great all rounder led Australia in four of the five Tests during 1894 tour. His 34 Test wickets was a series record at that time and he also scored the most runs for that series. Giffen played his last Test in 1896 but remained a force at the first-class level for some time, at the age of 41 he captured 13 English wickets to steer South Australia to a victory over the tourists. Three years later he finished his career with scores of 81, 97 not out and 15 wickets (7/75 and 8/110) against Victoria. Giffen was a robust batsman noted for his driving he also had a fine cut and glance. A slow to medium pace bowler he was brilliant with his deceptive off spin and the master in flight and changes of pace which he took many wickets.

George though has often been accused of more than a sprinkling of nepotism, using his influence to try to help his brother Walter Giffen. Walter played Test cricket for Australia despite below average performances for South Australia and when George was named Captain of the 1894 tour Walter having made 11 runs in his three Tests to date and a poor domestic season was also named, many believing because of George's influence over the selection. He has also been accused of causing the demise of cricketer Charlie Turner who was the country's leading wicket taker at the time, and then, in the following test which Australia needed to win, opening the bowling with himself.

George Giffen had a grandstand at the Adelaide Oval named after him. He died in Parkside, South Australia. In 2008 he was inducted into the Australian Cricket Hall of Fame

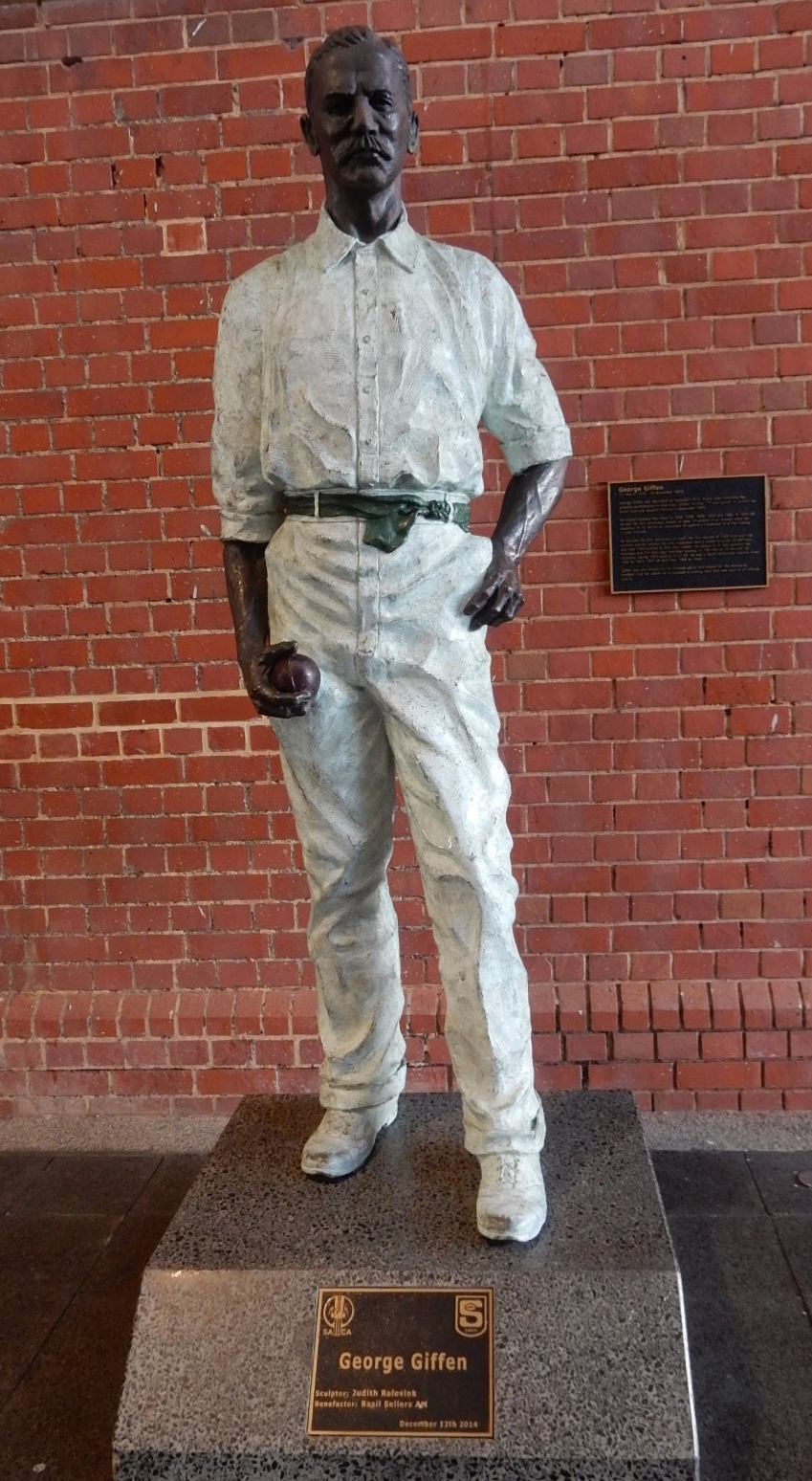
Statue of Giffen at Adelaide Oval.

In 2014, a statue of Giffen by sculptor Judith Rolevink was unveiled at Adelaide Oval.

== Personal life ==
Giffen also played Australian rules football at a high level, representing Woodville in the inaugural 1877 SAFA season and then Norwood Football Club from 1878 to 1885 for whom he is credited as kicking their first ever goal from a running kick in the South Australian Football Association. "He would cap brilliant runs that paralysed all opposition with superb kicks, turning in a moment the whole tide of play.", an observer at the time said.

He wrote an autobiography entitled With Bat and Ball.
