= George Wyatt (cricketer) =

English cricketer

George Nevile Wyatt (25 August 1850 – 16 February 1926) was an English first-class cricketer. He was a right-handed batsman and a roundarm right arm medium pace bowler who played mainly for Gloucestershire County Cricket Club from 1871 to 1876 and later for Marylebone Cricket Club (MCC), Surrey County Cricket Club and Sussex County Cricket Club before retiring in 1886. Wyatt was born at Champaran, India.

Wyatt made 72 first-class appearances, scoring 2,015 runs at 16.38 with a highest innings of 112, which was his only century, in addition to 10 half-centuries. He held 38 catches in his career and took 3 wickets at 42.33 with a best analysis of 1–4. He was club captain at Sussex in the 1885 season.

Wyatt died at Clifton, Bristol on 16 February 1926.
