= Henry Phillips (cricketer) =

English cricketer

Henry Phillips (14 October 1844 – 3 July 1919) was an English cricketer active from 1868 to 1891 who played for Sussex. He was born and died in Hastings. He appeared in 216 first-class matches as a righthanded batsman who bowled left-arm orthodox spin. He scored 2,998 runs with a highest score of 111 and took 14 wickets with a best performance of four for 33.
