= William Cooper (cricketer) =

Australian cricketer

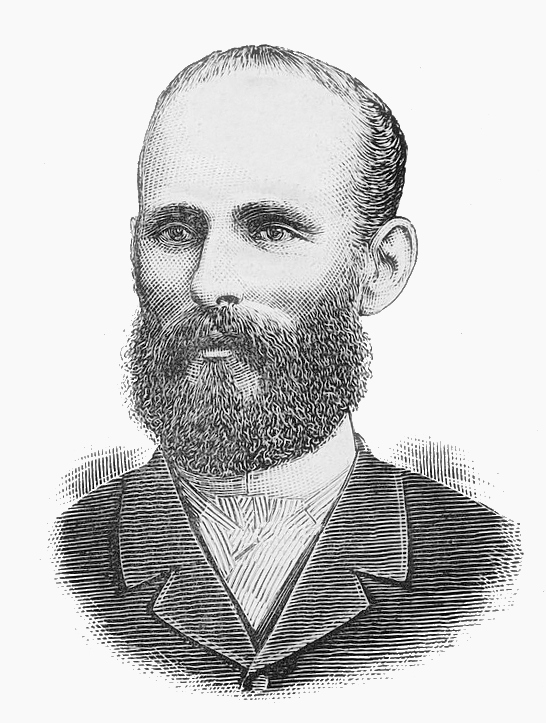

Personal information
- Full name: William Henry Cooper
- Born: 11 September 1849; Maidstone, Kent, England
- Died: 5 April 1939 (aged 89); Malvern, Melbourne, Victoria, Australia
- Batting: Right-handed
- Bowling: Leg break
- Relatives: Paul Sheahan (great-grandson)

International information
- National side: Australia
- Test debut (cap 25): 31 December 1881 v England
- Last Test: 12 December 1884 v England

Domestic team information
- Years: Team
- 1878/79–1886/87: Victoria

Career statistics
Competition	Test	First-class
Matches	2	26
Runs scored	13	247
Batting average	6.50	10.29
100s/50s	0/0	0/0
Top score	7	46
Balls bowled	446	3,162
Wickets	9	71
Bowling average	25.11	24.49
5 wickets in innings	1	5
10 wickets in match	0	0
Best bowling	6/120	7/37
Catches/stumpings	1/–	16/–
- Source: CricketArchive, 23 October 2010

William Henry Cooper (11 September 1849 – 5 April 1939) was an English-born Australian cricketer who played in two Test matches, one in each of the 1881–82 and 1884–85 seasons. He took six wickets on debut in the second innings against England in Melbourne in January 1882.

== Life and career ==
Born in Kent, Cooper migrated to Australia with his family when he was eight years old. He did not start playing competitive cricket until the age of 27, when his doctor suggested he take more exercise.

A leg-spin bowler, at the age of 29 Cooper made his first-class debut for Victoria, taking 5 for 79 and 2 for 46 in the two-wicket victory over the English cricket team in 1878–79. A year later he took 7 for 37 against New South Wales.

Cooper returned to England as part of Billy Murdoch's 1884 tour, but severely damaged his spinning finger playing deck hockey on the voyage to England. He was able to play only a few matches on the tour, and never fully recovered from the injury.

In the 1880s Cooper also served as a Victorian state selector and as a vice-president of the Victorian Cricket Association. He took up bowls and was eight times champion of his club, South Melbourne, and once Victorian champion of champions. He formed a bowls foursome with his three sons that was successful for some years. One of his sons died in France in World War I. His daughter was ladies' champion at South Melbourne.

Cooper died after a short illness in a hospital in the Melbourne suburb of Malvern in April 1939, aged 89. At the time he was Australia's oldest living Test cricketer. His great-grandson, Paul Sheahan, also played Test cricket for Australia.
