= John West (cricketer, born 1844) =

English cricketer and umpire (1844–1890)

Personal information
- Born: 16 October 1844; Little Sheffield, Yorkshire, England
- Died: 27 January 1890 (aged 45); Little Sheffield, Yorkshire, England
- Batting: Left-handed
- Bowling: Left-arm fast
- Role: Umpire

Domestic team information
- Years: Team
- 1868–1883: Yorkshire

Umpiring information
- Tests umpired: 1 (1886)

Career statistics
Competition	First-class
Matches	52
Runs scored	605
Batting average	8.52
100s/50s	0/0
Top score	41
Balls bowled	2,909
Wickets	75
Bowling average	14.62
5 wickets in innings	5
10 wickets in match	0
Best bowling	7/42
Catches/stumpings	16/–
- Source: Cricinfo, 13 July 2013

John West (16 October 1844 – 27 January 1890) was an English first-class cricketer, who played 38 games for Yorkshire County Cricket Club between 1868 and 1876, 13 games for the Marylebone Cricket Club (MCC) between 1869 and 1883, plus one for the "Left Handed" against the "Right Handed". He was on the MCC groundstaff for twenty years.

Born in Sheffield, Yorkshire, West was a left-arm fast round-arm bowler and left-handed batsman. His best bowling, 7 for 42 for the MCC, came against Hampshire in 1880, and he also recorded figures of 5 wickets for 3 runs, off 11.3 four-ball overs, for Yorkshire against Surrey in 1870. In all, he took five wickets in an innings on five occasions, and 75 wickets at an average of 14.62. A tail-end batsman, he scored 605 runs at 8.52, with a best of 41 in a Roses Match against Lancashire in Sheffield in 1871.

After retiring from the game, West became a first-class umpire, standing in at least 65 matches. He umpired in a Test match on 5 July 1886, when England played Australia at Old Trafford.

West died in January 1890 in Sheffield after an illness.
