= Frank Farrands =

English cricketer and test match umpire

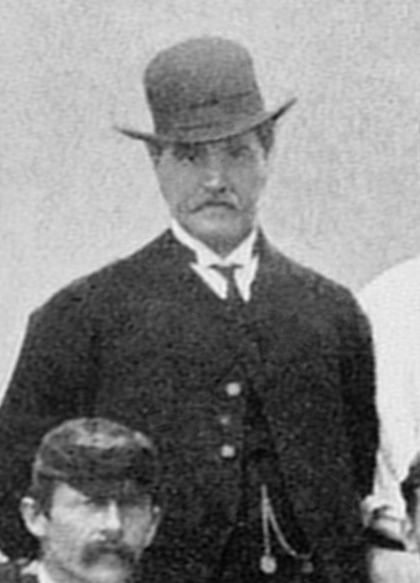
- Farrands in 1886

Personal information
- Full name: Frank Henry Farrands
- Born: 28 March 1835; Sutton-in-Ashfield, Nottinghamshire, England
- Died: 22 September 1916 (aged 81); Sutton-in-Ashfield, Nottinghamshire, England
- Batting: Right-handed
- Bowling: Right-arm fast (roundarm)

Domestic team information
- Years: Team
- 1868–1880: Marylebone Cricket Club
- 1871: Nottinghamshire

Career statistics
Competition	First-class
Matches	30
Runs scored	212
Batting average	6.23
100s/50s	0/0
Top score	41
Balls bowled	5172
Wickets	128
Bowling average	15.03
5 wickets in innings	12
10 wickets in match	4
Best bowling	6/23
Catches/stumpings	13/–
- Source: Cricinfo

Frank Henry Farrands (28 March 1835 – 22 September 1916) was an English first-class cricketer and Test match umpire.

A right-handed roundarm fast bowler, Farrands took 128 wickets for Marylebone Cricket Club (1868–1880), Nottinghamshire (1871) and others in 30 matches at an average of 15. he was on the ground staff at Lord's from 1868 to 1908. In 1870, at Lord's, he came into the Players' team at the last moment as a substitute and took 10 wickets in the match for 88 runs, including his best first-class figures of 6 for 23 in the second innings.

He umpired in first-class cricket from 1868 to 1900, standing in seven Ashes Tests on the Australian tours of 1884, 1886 and 1888. He umpired 216 first-class cricket matches, but it is estimated that he umpired, in all, about 2000 cricket matches.
