= Hugh Massie =

Australian cricketer

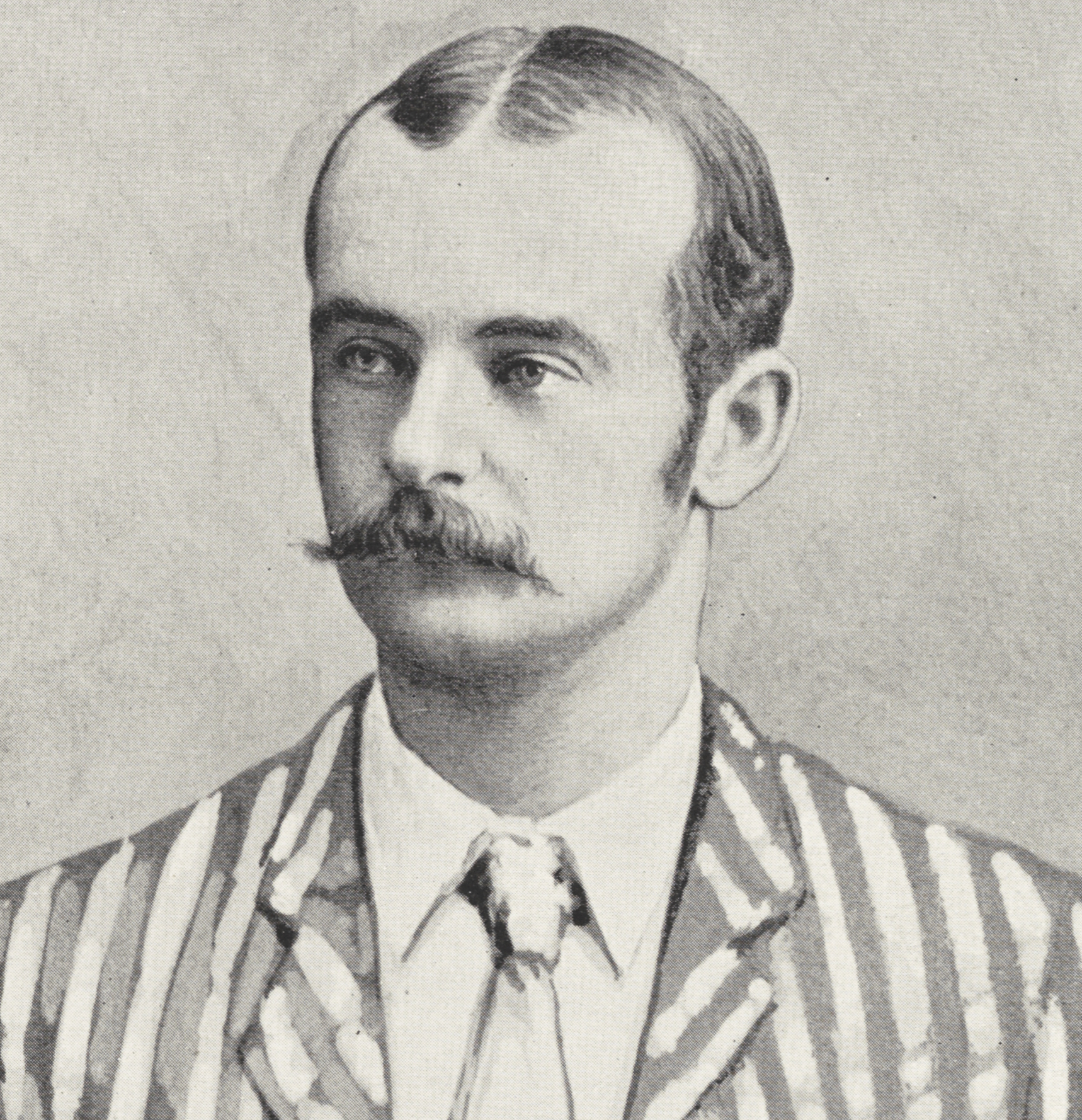

Personal information
- Full name: Hugh Hamon Massie
- Born: 11 April 1855; Near Belfast, now Port Fairy, Victoria, Australia
- Died: 12 October 1938 (aged 83); Point Piper, New South Wales, Australia
- Height: 1.83 m (6 ft 0 in)
- Batting: Right-handed
- Role: Top-order batsman

International information
- National side: Australia (1881–1885)
- Test debut (cap 28): 31 December 1881 v England
- Last Test: 24 February 1885 v England

Domestic team information
- Years: Team
- 1878–1888: New South Wales

Career statistics
| Competition | Tests | FC |
|---|---|---|
| Matches | 9 | 64 |
| Runs scored | 249 | 2485 |
| Batting average | 15.56 | 23.00 |
| 100s/50s | 0/1 | 1/13 |
| Top score | 55 | 206 |
| Balls bowled | 0 | 126 |
| Wickets | 0 | 2 |
| Bowling average | n/a | 30.00 |
| 5 wickets in innings | 0 | 0 |
| 10 wickets in match | 0 | 0 |
| Best bowling | n/a | 2/39 |
| Catches/stumpings | 5/0 | 35/0 |
- Source: CricketArchive, 14 April 2008

Hugh Hamon Massie (11 April 1855 – 12 October 1938) was a cricketer who played for New South Wales and Australia.

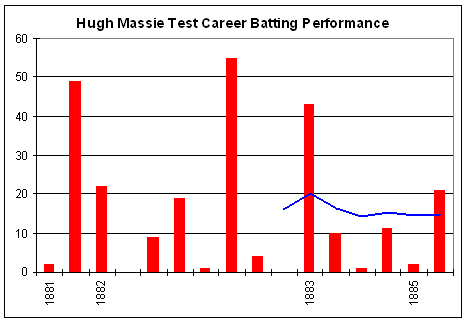
Hugh Massie's Test career batting graph.

Massie's role in the 1882 Ashes Test at The Oval was almost as pivotal in deciding the result as Fred Spofforth's celebrated performance with the ball. With Alick Bannerman as his opening partner, the hard-hitting Massie scored 55 in 57 minutes from just sixty deliveries, with nine fours, to give the Australians a chance. They duly took the match to win by seven runs.

His son Jack Massie was a noted New South Wales cricketer in the 1910s.

== See also ==
- List of New South Wales representative cricketers

| Preceded by Tom Horan | Australian Test cricket captains 1884-5 | Succeeded by Jack Blackham |
