= Sheffield Park cricket ground =

Cricket ground in England

Coordinates: 50.996715°N 0.023244°E

Sheffield Park
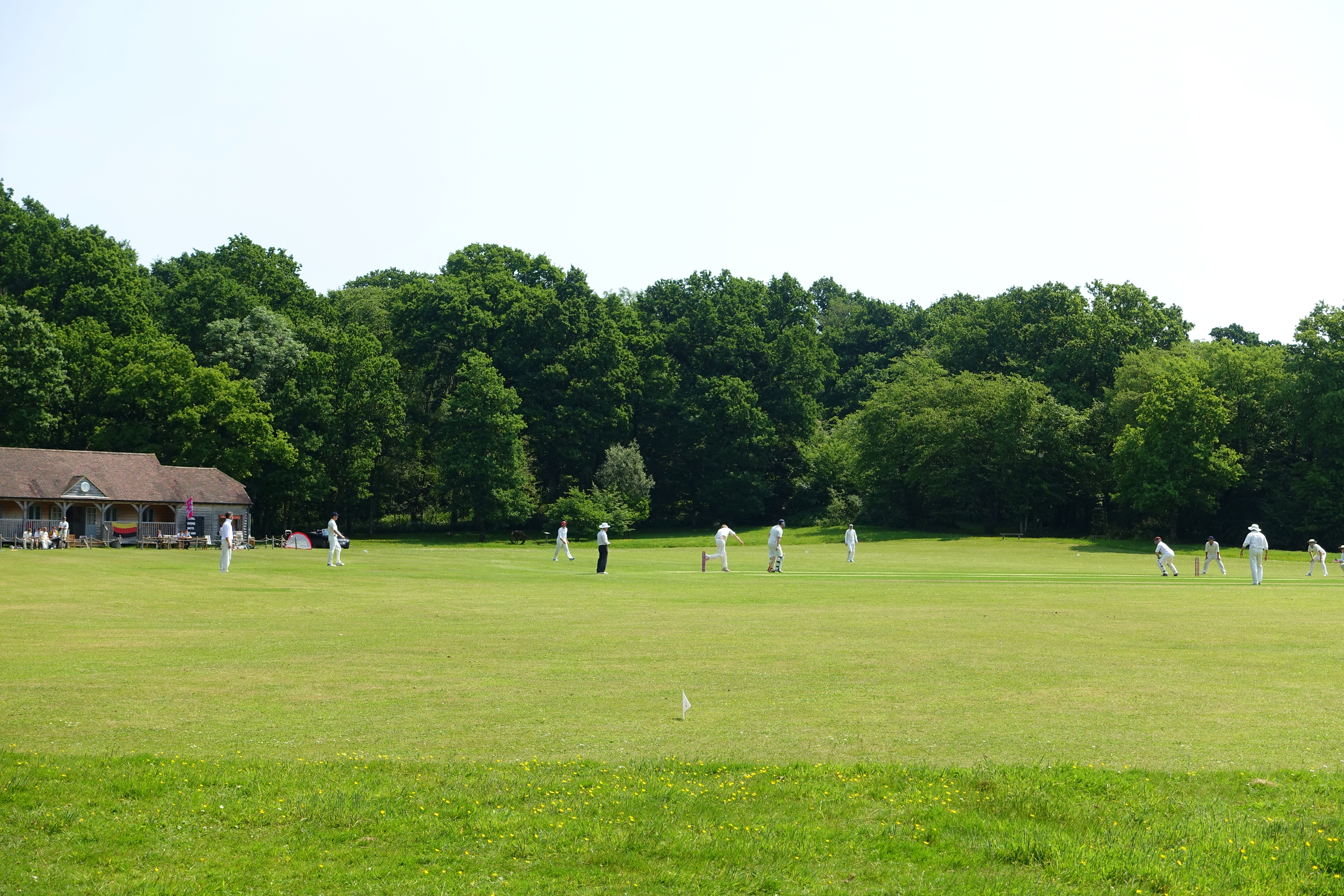
- Interactive map of Sheffield Park

Ground information
- Location: near Uckfield, East Sussex
- Country: England
- Establishment: 1845

Team information
Lord Sheffield's XI	(1881—1896)
- As of 27 August 2010; Source: Ground profile

Sheffield Park is a cricket ground at the Sheffield Park estate, located near Uckfield, East Sussex, England. From 1881 to 1896 it was the home ground of Lord Sheffield's XI, organised by Henry Holroyd, 3rd Earl of Sheffield, who in 1891 donated £150 to the New South Wales Cricket Association which was used to purchase a plate and establish the competition known as the Sheffield Shield. Cricket had been played at the ground for the previous 30 years before 1881, but these matches were unrecorded.

The first recorded match on the ground was in 1881, when Lord Sheffield's XI played Alfred Shaw's XI, which was also the first first-class match on the ground. From 1881 to 1896, Lord Sheffield's XI played 9 first-class matches, the last of which came against the touring Australians. During this match, 25,000 people were allowed to watch the match for free; Lord Sheffield never charged for people to come and watch matches at the ground.

Lord Sheffield had an octagonal pavilion constructed during 1881–1882, and later a separate ladies pavilion was built. Following Lord Sheffield's death in 1909, with him cricket largely died out at the estate. During World War I the ground was requisitioned for farming, wiping out the cricket ground. Subsequently, trees were planted on the site, but most were blown down in the 1987 hurricane. In 2009, a new square was laid, a pavilion was built, and the outfield was restored in its parkland setting. The reopening of the ground was celebrated with a match between an Old England XI and a Lord Sheffield Australian XI. Today, the restored ground is the home of the Armadillos Cricket Club.
