= Charles Pullin =

English cricket umpire (1838–1894)

Charles King Pullin (1838–1894) was a cricket Test match umpire. He stood in 10 tests between 1884 and 1893. He died in Bristol.
