= Joey Palmer =

Australian cricketer

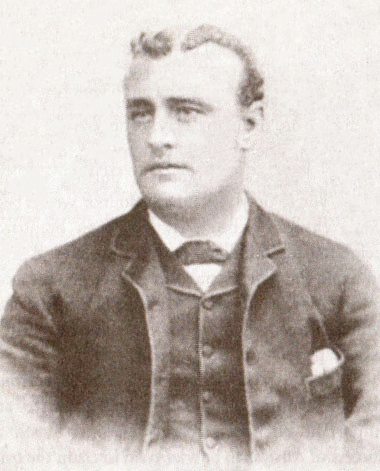
- Born: George Eugene Palmer; 22 February 1859; Mulwala, New South Wales
- Died: 22 August 1910 (aged 51); Benalla, Victoria
- Spouse: Lucinda Ann Blackham
- Parent(s): David Brainard Palmer and Mary Palmer (nee Barry)
- Relatives: Jack Blackham (brother-in-law)
- Cricket career

Cricket information
- Batting: Right-handed
- Bowling: Right-arm offbreak

International information
- National side: Australia
- Test debut (cap 23): 6 September 1880 v England
- Last Test: 12 August 1886 v England

Career statistics
Competition	Test	First-class
Matches	17	133
Runs scored	296	2,728
Batting average	14.09	16.14
100s/50s	0/0	1/10
Top score	48	113
Balls bowled	4,517	27,809
Wickets	78	594
Bowling average	21.51	17.71
5 wickets in innings	6	54
10 wickets in match	2	16
Best bowling	7/65	8/48
Catches/stumpings	13/–	107/–
- Source: Cricinfo, 11 February 2020

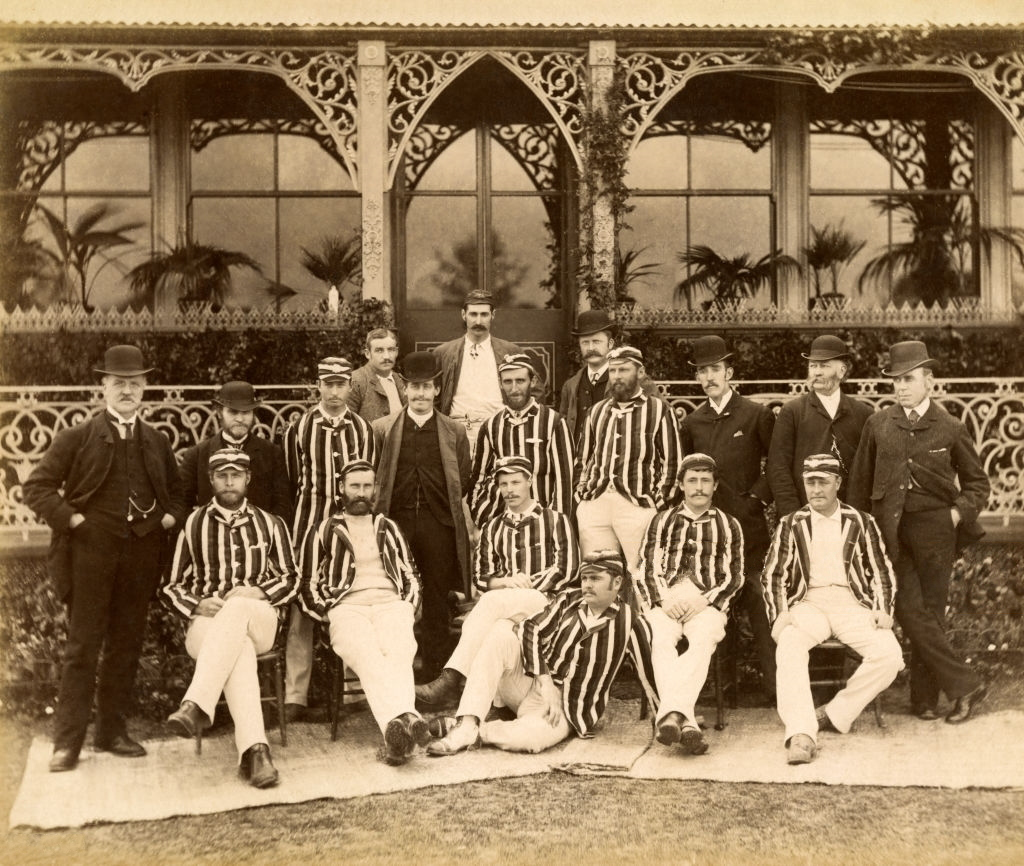
Palmer pictured right (front row) with the 1886 Australia national cricket team

George Eugene Palmer (22 February 1859 – 22 August 1910) also known as Eugene Palmer and Joey Palmer, was an Australian cricketer who played in 17 Test matches between 1880 and 1886.

After returning from the 1886 tour to England he damaged his knee and never played Test cricket again but came to play first class cricket in Australia until the end of 1896/97.

Palmer was also a leading Australian rules footballer for South Melbourne Football Club in the Victorian Football Association (VFA).

== Family ==
He married Lucinda Ann Blackham, daughter of Frederic Keane Blackham and Lucinda Ann (née McCarthy), in 1888. His brother-in-law was his Test teammate Jack Blackham.

== Sources ==
- Atkinson, G. (1982) Everything you ever wanted to know about Australian rules football but couldn't be bothered asking, The Five Mile Press: Melbourne. ISBN 0 86788 009 0
- Cricinfo article on Joey Palmer
