= Jack Blackham =

Australian cricketer

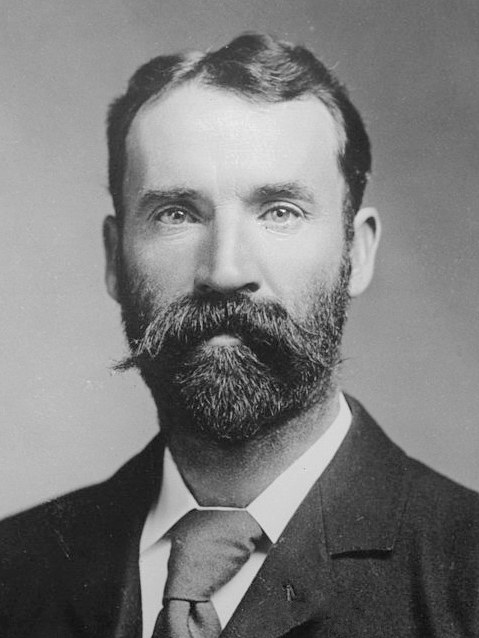
- Blackham in about 1885
- Born: John McCarthy Blackham; 11 May 1854; Fitzroy North, Victoria, Australia
- Died: 28 December 1932 (aged 78); Melbourne, Victoria, Australia
- Occupation: Bank Clerk
- Parent(s): Frederick Kane Blackham and Lucinda (née McCarthy).
- Relatives: George Eugene "Joey" Palmer (brother-in-law). Henry Hamilton Blackham (uncle)
- Cricket career

Personal information
- Nickname: Prince of wicket-keepers, Black Jack
- Height: 1.76 m (5 ft 9 in)
- Batting: Right-handed
- Role: Wicket-keeper

International information
- National side: Australia
- Test debut (cap 2): 15 March 1877 v England
- Last Test: 20 December 1894 v England

Domestic team information
- Years: Team
- 1874–1895: Victoria

Career statistics
Competition	Tests	First-class
Matches	35	275
Runs scored	800	6,395
Batting average	15.68	16.78
100s/50s	0/4	1/26
Top score	74	109
Balls bowled	–	312
Wickets	–	2
Bowling average	–	69.00
5 wickets in innings	–	0
10 wickets in match	–	0
Best bowling	–	1/8
Catches/stumpings	37/24	274/181
- Source: ESPNCricinfo, 11 March 2008

John McCarthy Blackham (11 May 1854 – 28 December 1932) was a Test cricketer who played for Victoria and Australia.

A specialist wicket-keeper, Blackham played in the first Test match at the Melbourne Cricket Ground in March 1877 and the famous Ashes Test match of 1882. Such was his skill in the position that he revolutionised the art of wicket-keeping and was known as the "prince of wicket-keepers". Late in his career, he captained the Australian team.

== Early life ==
Blackham was born in the inner-Melbourne suburb of Fitzroy North, the son of newsagent Frederick Kane Blackham and his wife Lucinda (née McCarthy). Blackham began working as a clerk for the Colonial Bank of Australasia. It is said that his thick dark beard, perceived then as a sign of an equable and reliable nature, reassured his customers. His brother-in-law was George Eugene "Joey" Palmer.

== Cricket career ==
Blackham was included in the first eleven of the Carlton Cricket Club as a batsman at the age of sixteen. He first appeared for the Victorian team in 1874, and remained an automatic selection as the team's wicket-keeper for over twenty years. He was a member of the first eight Australian cricket teams to visit England.

He was one of the first wicket-keepers to stand up close to the stumps, even to the fastest bowlers, wearing gloves that Jack Pollard describes as "little more than gardening gloves". He eliminated the need for a long-stop, and Pollard says that "... in England on one of his trips there a group of clergymen complained that he was a danger to the wellbeing of cricket, encouraging as he did the abolition of long-stop, the clergy's traditional fielding spot in village teams."

Blackham was selected for the very first Test match, held at Melbourne in March 1876/77. Australia's leading bowler Fred Spofforth refused to play in the match, because Blackham was preferred to Spofforth's New South Wales teammate Billy Murdoch. In the Test match, Blackham took three catches and made the first Test-Match stumping, when he dismissed Alfred Shaw off the bowling of Tom Kendall in England's second innings. In 1878, he represented his country for the first time overseas, as a member of the inaugural Australian cricket team to tour England and North America.

Described by teammates as the "prince of wicket-keepers" and one of Australia's first cricketing heroes, "Black Jack" Blackham (nicknamed for his dark beard) was Australia's regular wicket-keeper from 1877 to 1894.

== Test career ==
Jack Blackham spent most of the 1st day of the 1st Test Match in the Home Dressing Room as he was batting at No: 8. He made his Test debut when Ned Gregory, Australia' No: 7 achieved the dubious distinction of being the 1st Test Batsman to score a duck. Australia were 143 for 6. He became Charles Bannerman's 7th partner (Bannerman was 107 not out). Jack Blackham was 22 years 308 days old and became, at that time the youngest Test player in Test cricket. Previously the youngest had been Tom Horan (Australia No: 3) who was 64 days older than Jack Blackham.

== His final Test ==
As a right-hand batsman, Blackham was a useful lower-order player. At the age of forty, he played his last Test Match at the SCG against Andrew Stoddart's English team. As Blackham spun the coin on that opening morning, "Stoddy" remarked, "Someone will be swearing directly, Jack. I hope it's you."

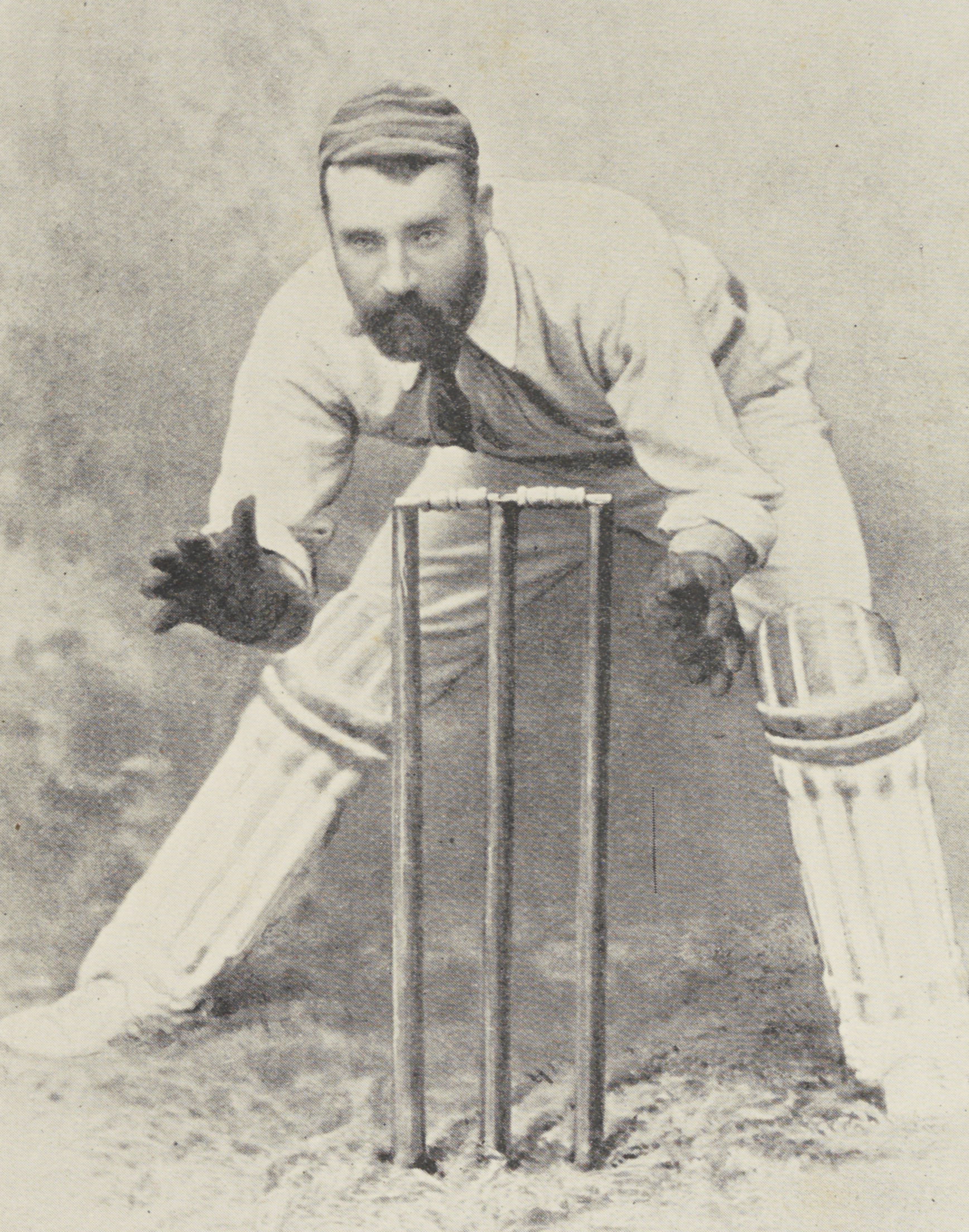
Blackham at the stumps

It was not: Blackham won the toss and elected to bat, and made 74 runs in a partnership of 154 with Syd Gregory, who scored 201. This helped Australia on its way to a massive (and apparently unassailable) total of 586. After England followed on, Blackham's men were eventually left to make just 176 in the final innings to win. They had scored 113 for the loss of just two wickets at the close of play on the fifth evening, but it rained hard during the night.

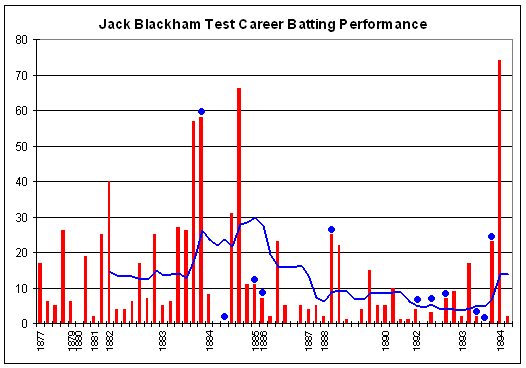
Jack Blackham's Test career batting graph.

Blackham's veteran teammate George Giffen, however, slept right through the storm and was blissfully unaware of it when he got up the following morning, a bright and sunny one. Giffen greeted his captain cheerily at breakfast but was met with a face as "long as a coffee-pot". Blackham told him what had happened and forecast ominously the danger as the Australian team travelled to the ground, the carriage leaving deep furrows in the moist turf. Blackham was right to be so concerned: on a horrific "sticky dog", his side eventually collapsed to 166 all out, losing the match by ten runs. At the close, with the Englishmen celebrating, "Blackham walked up and down the balcony like a caged tiger, muttering 'Cruel luck – cruel luck'.... In short, the team were thoroughly cut up seeing victory thus snatched away.... 'The rain beat us,' said some of them."

"No!" retorted the Prince of Wicketkeepers. "The sun beat us" – which was probably closer to the mark.

Blackham injured himself in this match and never played Test cricket or kept wickets again.

== Summary ==
In his 35 Tests, which included Australia's first seventeen Tests, Blackham made 800 runs at an average of 15.68 (highest score of 74), and he dismissed 60 batsmen (36 caught, 24 stumped). In 45 matches for Victoria he scored 1600 runs at 22.85, with one century (109 in 1884), and dismissed 451 batsmen.

He captained Australia in eight matches, winning three. His nervous temperament meant that he worried over small setbacks, and he could not bear to watch close finishes.

Blackham was also a leading Australian rules footballer for Fitzroy Football Club in the Victorian Football Association (VFA) during the 1880s.

Blackham later invested his earnings from his tours of England, without success. A lifelong bachelor, he died in Melbourne, Victoria, with his funeral proceeding from St Paul's Cathedral to the Melbourne Crematorium the next morning.

== Recognition ==
In 1996, he was made one of the ten inaugural inductees into the Australian Cricket Hall of Fame, the others being Fred Spofforth, Victor Trumper, Clarrie Grimmett, Bill Ponsford, Sir Donald Bradman, Bill O'Reilly, Keith Miller, Ray Lindwall, and Dennis Lillee.

== Sources ==
- Jack Blackham at Cricinfo
- Pollard, Jack, Australian Cricket: 1803–1893, The Formative Years, Sydney, The Book Company, 1995. (ISBN 0-207-15490-2)
- Pollard, Jack, Australian Cricket: The Game and the Players, Sydney, Hodder & Stoughton, 1982. (ISBN 0-340-28796-9)
- Robinson, Ray, On Top Down Under: Australia's Cricket Captains, Sydney, Cassell, 1975. (ISBN 0-7269-7364-5)
- Serle, Percival (1949). "Blackham, John". Dictionary of Australian Biography. Sydney: Angus & Robertson.

Preceded by Hugh Massie	Australian Test cricket captains 1884/5	Succeeded by Tup Scott
Preceded by Billy Murdoch	Australian Test cricket captains 1891/2-1894/5	Succeeded by George Giffen
Preceded by none	Australian Test wicket-keepers 1876–1894	Succeeded by Billy Murdoch
