= English cricket team in Australia in 1882–83 =

Cricket tour

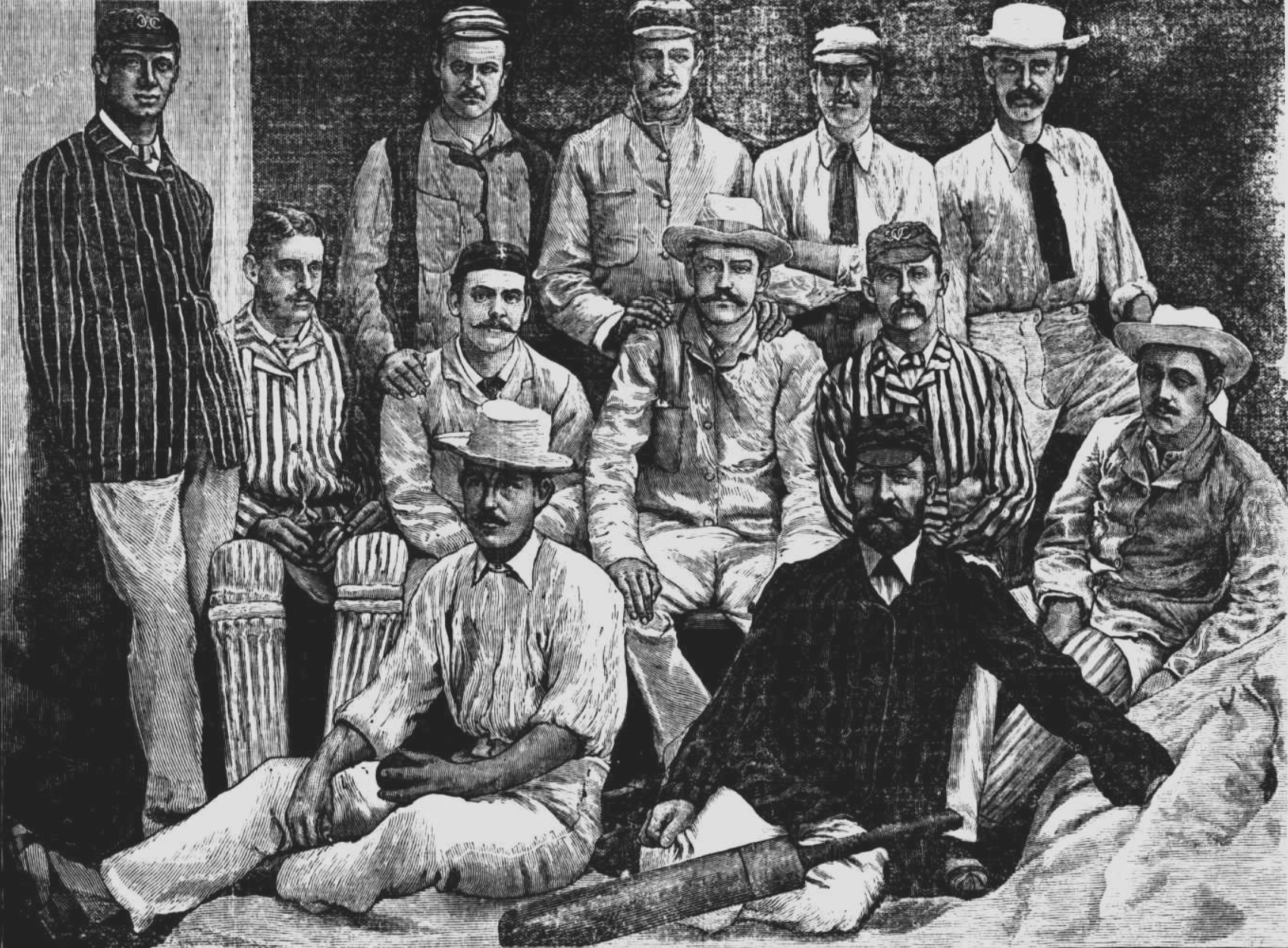
Sketch of the English Touring Squad, 1882.

An English cricket team toured Australia and Ceylon in 1882–83. Captained by Ivo Bligh, the team was on a quest "to recover those Ashes", a reference to the famous RIP notice that was published in the aftermath of England's defeat by Australia at The Oval in the previous English season.

Originally, three matches were arranged between Bligh's XI and a Combined Australia XI. Bligh's XI won two of these after losing the first. Although the actual sequence of events has never been completely confirmed, it was after winning the third match that Bligh was somehow presented with a small urn which is believed to contain the ashes of a burnt bail. He brought this back to England and it is now the most famous exhibit in the museum at Lord's Cricket Ground. England and Australia have been contesting these mythical Ashes ever since. A fourth match was arranged ad hoc after the original series had been completed, and was won by the Australians. Following publication of Clarence P. Moody's proposed Test cricket list in 1894, all four matches were retrospectively recognised as Test matches.

== Test matches ==
These matches were not called Tests at the time but they were retrospectively recognised after they were included in Australian Cricket and Cricketers, 1856 to 1893–94 (1894) by Clarence P. Moody. Each match was originally billed as Combined Australia XI v I. F. W. Bligh's XI.

=== First Test ===
30 December 1882 – 2 January 1883
(Timeless Test)
Scorecard

Australia	v	England
291 (169 overs); G. J. Bonnor 85; C. F. H. Leslie 3/31 (11 overs)		177 (107.2 overs); E. F. S. Tylecote 33; G. E. Palmer 7/65 (52.2 overs)
58/1 (53.1 overs); W. L. Murdoch 33*; W. Barnes 1/6 (13 overs)		169 (f/o) (99.1 overs); E. F. S. Tylecote 38; G. Giffen 4/38 (20 overs)

Australia won by 9 wickets
Melbourne Cricket Ground, Melbourne
Umpires: E. H. Elliott (Aus) and J. S. Swift (Aus)

- Australia won the toss and elected to bat.
- 31 December 1882 was taken as a rest day.
- Hon. I. F. W. Bligh, C. F. H. Leslie, W. W. Read, G. B. Studd, E. F. S. Tylecote and G. F. Vernon (all Eng) made their Test debuts.

=== Second Test ===
19–22 January 1883
(Timeless Test)
Scorecard

England	v	Australia
294 (183.3 overs); W. W. Read 75; G. E. Palmer 5/103 (66.3 overs)		114 (98.2 overs); H. H. Massie 43; W. Bates 7/28 (26.2 overs)
		153 (f/o) (69 overs); G. J. Bonnor 34; W. Bates 7/74 (33 overs)

England won by an innings and 27 runs
Melbourne Cricket Ground, Melbourne
Umpires: E. H. Elliott (Aus) and J. S. Swift (Aus)

- England won the toss and elected to bat.
- 21 January was taken as a rest day.
- This was the first Test match to be won by an innings margin.
- Billy Bates became the first England player to take a Test hat-trick with the first-innings wickets of Percy McDonnell, George Giffen and George Bonnor. He was also the first player in Test history to score a 50 and take 10 wickets in a match.

=== Third Test ===
26–30 January 1883
(Timeless Test)
Scorecard

England	v	Australia
247 (143 overs); W. W. Read 66; F. R. Spofforth 4/73 (51 overs)		218 (179.1 overs); A. C. Bannerman 94; F. Morley 4/47 (34 overs)
123 (80.1 overs); C. T. Studd 25; F. R. Spofforth 7/44 (41.1 overs)		83 (69.2 overs); J. M. Blackham 26; R. G. Barlow 7/40 (34.2 overs)

England won by 69 runs
Sydney Cricket Ground, Sydney
Umpires: E. H. Elliott (Aus) and J. S. Swift (Aus)

- England won the toss and elected to bat.
- 28 January was taken as a rest day.
- This match saw the creation of the Ashes urn; with England having won the series, some Australian ladies burnt a bail and put the ashes in an urn, which remains in the Memorial Gallery at Lord's.

=== Fourth Test ===
17–21 February 1883
(Timeless Test)
Scorecard

England	v	Australia
263 (155 overs); A. G. Steel 135; H. F. Boyle 3/52 (40 overs)		262 (146 overs); G. J. Bonnor 87; A. G. Steel 3/34 (18 overs)
197 (126.3 overs); W. Bates 48*; T. P. Horan 2/15 (9 overs)		199/6 (163.1 overs); A. C. Bannerman 63; A. G. Steel 3/49 (43 overs)

Australia won by 4 wickets
Sydney Cricket Ground, Sydney
Umpires: E. H. Elliott (Aus) and J. S. Swift (Aus)

- England won the toss and elected to bat.
- 18 February was taken as a rest day.
- Four separate pitches were used in the match, one for each innings.

== Players ==
England was captained by Ivo Bligh and had Edward Tylecote as its specialist wicket-keeper, the other players being Billy Bates, Dick Barlow, A. G. Steel, Charles Leslie, Walter Read, Charles Studd, Fred Morley, Billy Barnes, George Vernon and George Studd.

Australia was captained by Billy Murdoch and had Jack Blackham as wicket-keeper. Other players to represent Australia were Billy Midwinter, Alec Bannerman, George Bonnor, Tom Horan, Percy McDonnell, George Giffen, Harry Boyle, Edwin Evans, Hugh Massie, Eugene Palmer, Tom Garrett and Fred Spofforth.

== Ceylon ==
The team used Colombo as a stopover during its long sea voyage and played two matches against local sides in October 1882 that were not first-class. This was the first time that an overseas team visited Ceylon.

13 – 14 October 1882	Europeans	v	I. F. W. Bligh's XI	Match drawn
Scorecard	92 (47 overs); E. Cave-Browne 19; C. T. Studd 5/21 (10 overs)		155/9 (73 overs) (d); C. F. H. Leslie 23; Jackson 4/27 (25 overs)	Galle Face, Colombo
Scorecard	16/7 (14.4 overs); Bird 7 W. Bates 6/8 (7.4 overs)			Galle Face, Colombo
Europeans won the toss and elected to bat; Europeans had 18 players

23 October 1882	Royal Dublin Fusiliers	v	I. F. W. Bligh's XI	Match drawn
Scorecard	24/9 (20 overs); Bird 7 W. Bates 5/14 (10 overs)		184 (98.4 overs); E. F. S. Tylecote 44; Carr 3/32 (21.1 overs)	Colombo
Royal Dublin Fusiliers had 18 players

== Other matches in Australia ==
Besides the four against Combined Australia, Bligh's XI played in fourteen matches against colonial and club teams. Some of these were scheduled for two days' play, others for three days.

10–11 November 1882	South Australia	v	I. F. W. Bligh's XI	Match drawn
Scorecard	128/7 (96 overs); J. Noel 37; F. Morley 3/17 (19 overs)		153 (113 overs); E. F. S. Tylecote 59; Quilty 6/60 (36 overs)	Adelaide Oval, Adelaide
I. F. W. Bligh's XI won the toss and elected to bat; South Australia had 15 players

17–20 November 1882	Victoria (Victoria (state))	v	I. F. W. Bligh's XI	I. F. W. Bligh's XI won by 10 wickets
Scorecard	104 (95.1 overs); E. Turner 25; W. W. Read 4/28 (12 overs)		273 (126.2 overs); C. T. Studd 56; W. H. Cooper 5/89 (35 overs)	Melbourne Cricket Ground, Melbourne; Umpires: Edward Elliott and J. A. Smith
Scorecard	169 (96.1 overs) (f/o); W. Bruce 40; R. G. Barlow 3/31 (16 overs)		4/0 (0.1 overs); R. G. Barlow 0* (1)	Melbourne Cricket Ground, Melbourne; Umpires: Edward Elliott and J. A. Smith
I. F. W. Bligh's XI won the toss and elected to bat; This match is retrospectively, but unofficially, recognised as first-class by some sources.

22–23 November 1882	Sandhurst (Victoria (state))	v	I. F. W. Bligh's XI	Match Drawn
Scorecard	100 (114.2 overs); G. N. Campbell 28; A. G. Steel 8/35 (40.2 overs)		117 (92 overs); C. F. H. Leslie 48*; Spargo 4/46 (40.1 overs)	Back Creek Ground, Bendigo
Scorecard	119 (92.3 overs); G. Mackay 29; A. G. Steel 10/35 (30 overs)		28/0 (11 overs); G. B. Studd 19*	Back Creek Ground, Bendigo
Sandhurst had 22 players

24–25 November 1882	Castlemaine (Victoria (state))	v	I. F. W. Bligh's XI	Match Drawn
Scorecard	136 (154.1 overs); G. Smith 41; F. Morley 8/45 (51 overs)		238 (125 overs); C. T. Studd 52; Vick 2/0 (2 overs)	Wattle Flat, Castlemaine
Scorecard	22/8 (37 overs); Dawes 10; A. G. Steel 2/0 (2 overs)			Wattle Flat, Castlemaine
Castlemaine won the toss and elected to bat; Castlemaine had 22 players

1–4 December 1882	New South Wales	v	I. F. W. Bligh's XI	I. F. W. Bligh's XI won by an innings and 144 runs
Scorecard	152 (140.1 overs); A. P. Marr 34; A. G. Steel 5/32 (28 overs)		461 (221 overs); C. F. H. Leslie 144; Edwin Evans 6/146 (85 overs)	Association Ground, Sydney; Umpires: W. C. Goddard and James Swift
Scorecard	165 (148 overs); J. J. Davis 85; R. G. Barlow 3/18 (26 overs)			Association Ground, Sydney; Umpires: W. C. Goddard and James Swift
New South Wales won the toss and elected to bat; This match is retrospectively, but unofficially, recognised as first-class by some sources.

6–7 December 1882	Maitland (New South Wales)	v	I. F. W. Bligh's XI	I. F. W. Bligh's XI won by an innings and 15 runs
Scorecard	49 (46.1 overs); J. McAlpine 15; A. G. Steel 8/25 (23 overs)		155 (88.1 overs); W. Barnes 25; McAlpine 3/44 (31 overs)	Albion Ground, West Maitland
Scorecard	91 (52.3 overs); T. A. Onus 20; C. T. Studd 7/30 (17 overs)			Albion Ground, West Maitland
I. F. W. Bligh's XI won the toss and elected to bat; Maitland had 18 players

8–9 December 1882	Newcastle (New South Wales)	v	I. F. W. Bligh's XI	Match Drawn
Scorecard	67 (82.2 overs); W. Smith 13; A. G. Steel 7/36 (38 overs)		339 (246.2 overs); W. W. Read 64; Ryder 3/70 (76 overs)	Newcastle Number 1 Sports Ground, Newcastle
Scorecard	54/15 (75 overs); J. Rodgers 12; A. G. Steel 10/29 (38 overs)			Newcastle Number 1 Sports Ground, Newcastle
Newcastle won the toss and elected to bat; Newcastle had 18 players

11–12 December 1882	Tamworth (New South Wales)	v	I. F. W. Bligh's XI	Match Abandoned
Scorecard				Tamworth No 1 Oval, Tamworth
No toss

26–28 December 1882	Ballarat (Victoria (state))	v	I. F. W. Bligh's XI	Match Drawn
Scorecard	227 (151 overs); P. McGregor 53; W. Barnes 7/24 (16 overs)		272 (201 overs); W. W. Read 55; Duffy 5/58 (52 overs)	Eastern Oval, Ballarat
Scorecard	176/14 (136 overs); P. Lewis 40; A. G. Steel 8/68 (43 overs)			Eastern Oval, Ballarat
Ballarat won the toss and elected to bat; Ballarat had 18 players

8–9 January 1883	Northern Tasmania CA.	v	I. F. W. Bligh's XI	I. F. W. Bligh's XI won by an innings and 75 runs
Scorecard	114 (99.2 overs); O. G. Douglas 29; W. Barnes 6/25 (29 overs)		270 (176 overs); C. T. Studd 99; T. Kendall 5/104 (85 overs)	NTCA. Ground, Launceston
Scorecard	81 (83 overs); O. G. Douglas 16; A. G. Steel 10/33 (30 overs)			NTCA. Ground, Launceston
Northern Tasmania Cricket Association won the toss and elected to bat; Northern Tasmania Cricket Association had 18 players

12–13 January 1883	Southern Tasmania CA.	v	I. F. W. Bligh's XI	I. F. W. Bligh's XI won by 7 wickets
Scorecard	82 (83 overs); J. G. Davies 23; A. G. Steel 6/42 (34 overs)		110 (103.1 overs); I. F. W. Bligh 32; T. Kendall 6/56 (48 overs)	TCA. Ground, Hobart
Scorecard	95 (74 overs); G. H. Arthur 14; A. G. Steel 7/41 (34 overs)		68/3 (44 overs); A. G. Steel 30*; Bayley 2/12 (20 overs)	TCA. Ground, Hobart
Southern Tasmania Cricket Association won the toss and elected to bat; Southern Tasmania Cricket Association had 18 players

2–3 February 1883	Queensland	v	I. F. W. Bligh's XI	I. F. W. Bligh's XI won by an innings and 154 runs
Scorecard	62 (82.3 overs); H. Strickland 10*; A. G. Steel 10/28 (41.3 overs)		265 (115 overs); W. W. Read 84; Wearne 5/79 (36 overs)	Eagle Farm Racecourse, Brisbane; Umpires: M. R. Cobbett and R. C. Miller
Scorecard	49 (38.1 overs); W. Hobbs 9* A. G. Steel 9/16 (19.1 overs)			Eagle Farm Racecourse, Brisbane; Umpires: M. R. Cobbett and R. C. Miller
I. F. W. Bligh's XI won the toss and elected to bat; Queensland had 18 players

8–9 February 1883	Maryborough (Queensland)	v	I. F. W. Bligh's XI	I. F. W. Bligh's XI won by an innings and 58 runs
Scorecard	42 (55 overs); J. T Gaskell 11; A. G. Steel 8/14 (24 overs)		179 (87.3 overs); W. W. Read 66; Roberts 6/62 (39.3 overs)	Showground Oval, Maryborough; Umpires: M. R. Cobbett and C. F. Gataker
Scorecard	79 (77 overs); R. S. Warry 30; A. G. Steel 8/28 (34 overs)			Showground Oval, Maryborough; Umpires: M. R. Cobbett and C. F. Gataker
Maryborough won the toss and elected to bat; Maryborough had 18 players

9–12 March 1883	Victoria (Victoria (state))	v	I. F. W. Bligh's XI	Victoria won by an innings and 73 runs
Scorecard	284 (219.2 overs); W. E. Midwinter 92*; W. Barnes 5/70 (51.2 overs)		55 (31.1 overs); C. T. Studd 11; E. Palmer 4/21 (15.1 overs)	Melbourne Cricket Ground, Melbourne; Umpires: W. C. Goddard and James Swift
Scorecard			156 (109 overs) (f/o); A. G. Steel 76; E. Palmer 7/65 (48 overs)	Melbourne Cricket Ground, Melbourne; Umpires: W. C. Goddard and James Swift
Victoria won the toss and elected to bat; This match is retrospectively, but unofficially, recognised as first-class by some sources.
