= List of highest individual scores in cricket =

A. E. J. Collins' record of 628 not out stood for over 100 years.

Cricket is a bat-and-ball game that originated in England around the 16th century. It is played between two teams, with each trying to score as many runs as they can, across one or two innings. Records for early cricket matches are incomplete and often non-existent, especially for very minor matches, but cricket historians have still attempted to trace the history of the "highest single innings score by a batsman in any class of cricket".

John Minshull scored the first recorded century in 1769, scoring 107 runs. The record was broken twice in the following ten years, but then stood for almost 30 years before Lord Frederick Beauclerk scored 170 runs in 1806. William Ward scored 278 runs for the Marylebone Cricket Club in 1820 to claim the record, which was the last time that the highest score was made during a match regarded as being first-class. His record was surpassed by just one run in a minor match in Essex before Edward Tylecote scored the first quadruple century in cricket, accruing 404 runs during a House match at Clifton College. Three further quadruple centurions increased the record in the 1880s.

In 1899, A. E. J. Collins scored 628 runs in another House match at Clifton College to claim the record, in an innings which spanned four afternoons. His record stood for over 116 years, until Pranav Dhanawade became the first player outside of England to make a record score. Batting for his school in the HT Bhandary Challenge Trophy, Dhanawade scored 1,009 runs from just 327 balls.

== Progression of record ==
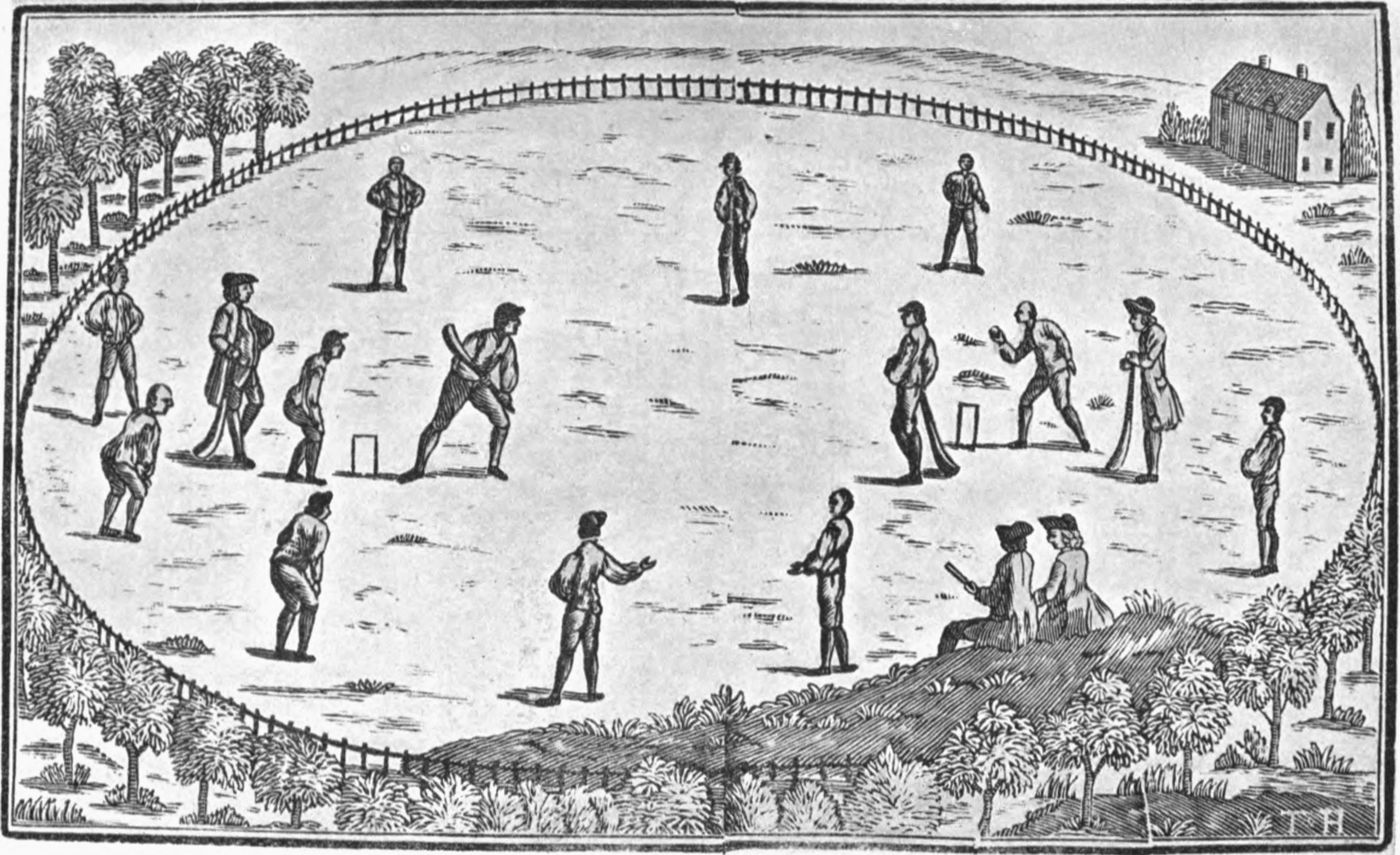
Two of the first three scores were made at The Vine, Sevenoaks, depicted here in 1780.

In 1769, John Minshull scored the first recorded century (100 runs or more) in cricket. At the time, it was uncommon for a team's innings to be in excess of 100 runs, as the poor quality of the cricket pitches made batting difficult. Most matches were played on fields grazed by sheep, rather than dedicated cricket grounds. Playing for the Duke of Dorset's team against a team from Wrotham, Minshull scored 107 runs in his side's second innings. Only the scores for the Duke of Dorset's team are recorded, so the result of the match is not known. There is some contention that John Small might have scored a century prior to Minshull; in 1768 he was recorded to have scored 140 runs in a match between Hambledon Club and Kent, but it is unclear whether his score was from one innings, or the aggregate of his two innings.

The next recorded highest score was that of John Small; batting in July 1775 for Hambledon (playing as Hampshire) against Surrey, he scored either 136 or 138 runs. Some online scorecards, such as CricketArchive have recorded the score as 136, while others, along with a contemporary scorecard from the Reading Mercury list it as 138. Minshull was also taking part in this game, but only managed scores of seven and two. Hambledon scored heavily in their second innings; in addition to Small's century, Richard Nyren scored 97 runs and Thomas Brett scored 69. Hambledon won the match by 273 runs. This match is retrospectively considered to be of first-cricket standard, and is considered to be the first century scored in first-class cricket. Two years later, in a match in which both previous record holders were also playing, James Aylward scored 167 runs for Hambledon (again playing as Hampshire) against an "All England" side. Minshull made the next highest individual score in the match, remaining 60 not out in All England's first innings, but Aylward's score, along with six scores of between 20 and 50 from his teammates, helped Hambledon to victory by an innings and 168 runs.

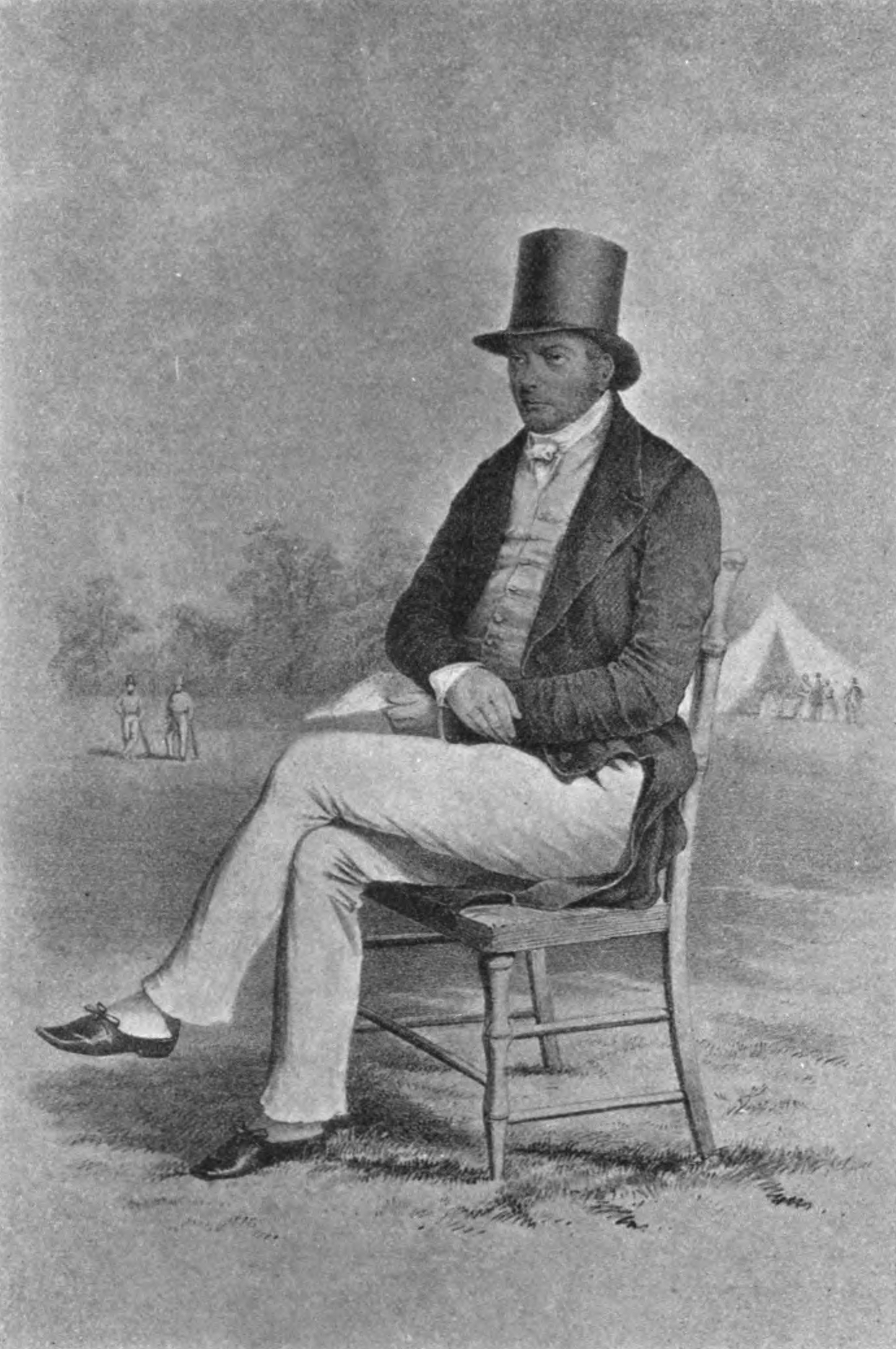
William Ward broke the previous record by a significant margin in 1820, progressing it from 170 to 278.

Aylward's record appears to have stood for around 29 years, before being marginally beaten. Playing as a given man for Homerton against Montpelier in a one-day game, Lord Frederick Beauclerk scored 170 runs in Homerton's second innings. Homerton had suffered a first innings deficit of 54 runs; only one player had scored ten or more runs, while Beauclerk himself had only managed two. In their response, Beauclerk's large innings helped his side to a total of 265 runs, and a lead of 211 runs. Montpelier conceded defeat after scoring 74 runs for the loss of seven wickets in their second innings. Having moved from 107 runs to 170 runs in increments, the record then leapt to 278 runs in 1820. William Ward made the score while playing for the Marylebone Cricket Club (MCC), alongside Beauclerk. Facing Norfolk, Ward scored his runs in the first innings to help the MCC to a total of 473 runs; Norfolk failed to score more than 100 in either of their batting efforts, and were beaten by 417 runs. The match is generally considered to be of first-class standard, and is the last time that the overall record was scored in first-class cricket. Ward's record was broken in 1837 in a match between two village teams. Playing in a single-innings one-day match, Alfred Adams opened the innings for Saffron Walden against Bishop's Stortford. Adams batted for most of the day to score 279 runs, beating Ward's record by just one run. Bishop's Stortford never got the chance to bat, as the Saffron Walden innings closed at seven in the evening, and the match was drawn.

== Key ==
Notation	Meaning
†	The score was also the highest in first-class cricket.
*	The player remained not out.
Inn.	The innings of the match in which the player scored his century.
Date	The date on which the match began.

== Highest score in cricket ==
Cricketers that have scored the highest score in cricket
No.	Batsman	Score	Inn.	For	Against	Venue	Date	Result	Ref.
1	John Minshull (Note: John Minshull was generally listed as John Minchin on cricket scorecards.)	107	3	Duke of Dorset's XI	Wrotham	The Vine, Sevenoaks, England	31 August 1769	Unknown	
2 †	John Small	138 (Note: This score is alternatively given as 136 runs by some sources.)	3	Hampshire (Hambledon)	Surrey	Broadhalfpenny Down, Hambledon, England	13 July 1775	Won by 273 runs	
3 †	James Aylward	167	2	Hampshire (Hambledon)	All England	The Vine, Sevenoaks, England	18 June 1777	Won by an innings and 168 runs	
4 (Note: Some statisticians consider this match first-class, while others consider it a minor match.)	Lord Frederick Beauclerk	170	3	Homerton	Montpelier	Aram's New Ground, Walworth, England	12 June 1806	Won by concession	
5 †	William Ward	278	1	Marylebone Cricket Club	Norfolk	Lord's Cricket Ground, London, England	24 July 1820	Won by 417 runs	
6	Alfred Adams	279	1	Saffron Walden	Bishop's Stortford	Saffron Walden, Essex, England	11 July 1837	Match drawn	
7	Edward Tylecote	404*	2	Classical	Modern	Clifton College Close Ground, Bristol, England	23 May 1868	Match drawn	
8	Bill Roe	415*	2	Emmanuel College, Cambridge Long Vacation Club	Gonville and Caius College, Cambridge Long Vacation Club	Fenner's, Cambridge, England	12 July 1881	Match drawn	
9	James Stewart Carrick	419*	1	West of Scotland	Chichester Priory Park	Priory Park, Chichester, England	13 July 1885	Match drawn	
10	Andrew Stoddart	485	1	Hampstead	Stoics	Lymington Road, Hampstead, England	4 August 1886	Match drawn	
11	A. E. J. Collins	628*	1	Clark's House Juniors	North Town Juniors	Clifton College Close Ground, Bristol, England	22 June 1899	Won by an innings and 688 runs	
12	Pranav Dhanawade	1,009*	2	Shrimati Kantaben Chandulal Gandhi English School, Kalyan	Arya Gurukul Central Board of Secondary Education School, Kalyan	Union Cricket Academy Ground, Kalyan, India	4 January 2016	Won by an innings and 1,382 runs	

== See also ==
- List of first-class cricket records
