= Keigwin =

The surname Keigwin (from Cornish, meaning "White dog" from the word "Kei" – a dog, and "gwyn" – white: and thus figuratively, a hero) might refer to:

- Herbert Keigwin (1878–1962), English cricketer
- Henry Keigwin (1881–1916), English cricketer
- Larry Keigwin, American choreographer
- R. P. Keigwin (Richard Prescott Keigwin, 1883–1972), English academic and cricketer
- Richard Keigwin (colonial administrator) (died 1690), governor of Bombay, 1683–1684
