= England cricket team Test results (1877–1914) =

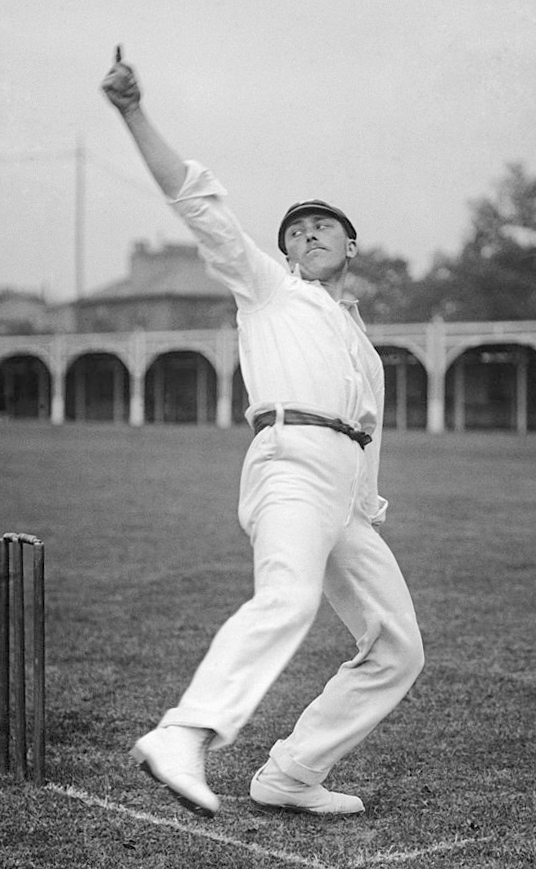
Wilfred Rhodes made the most appearances for England in Tests between 1877 and 1914.

The England cricket team represented England, Scotland and Wales in Test cricket. (Note: The England cricket team represented Scotland until 1992, when they left the UK Cricket Council, and later joined the International Cricket Council (ICC) as an independent member.) England played Australia in the first ever Test match, which took place at the Melbourne Cricket Ground in March 1877. Although four touring parties of English players had visited Australia prior to 1877, the Australian team had not previously been considered strong enough to play on equal terms. The two matches between the English cricketers and the Australians were retrospectively granted Test status.

Between 1877 and 1914, when competitive cricket was interrupted by the First World War, England played 123 Test matches, resulting in 59 victories, 22 draws and 42 defeats. For much of this period, England and Australia were the only Test playing countries and played each other every year or two. In 1888–89, England toured South Africa and played two matches subsequently deemed to be Test matches. Subsequently, the sides played each other sporadically and from 1906 fixtures were played as frequently as the Ashes series. In 1912, the three sides competed in a Triangular Tournament, which was deemed a failure, partly due to a damp English summer and in part because of the perceived complexity of the tournament.

Overall, by 1914, England had played 94 Test matches against Australia and 29 versus South Africa. England won 19 matches by an innings, with their largest victory being by an innings and 230 runs against Australia during the 1891–92 Ashes series, their eighth-best innings win of all time. Their largest victory by runs alone during this period was in 1896 against South Africa, when they won by 288 runs, while they won by 10 wickets on four occasions. England's victories by one wicket during this period are two of the three occasions that England have won by this margin in Test cricket, while their 10-run win over Australia during the 1894–95 Ashes series is their third-narrowest win by runs. In the first match of the 1886–87 Ashes series, England scored their lowest ever innings score in Test cricket, 45 runs. Despite that low score, they won the match by 13 runs.

== Key ==
Key
Symbol	Meaning
No. (Eng.)	Match number for England (i.e. 123 was England's 123rd Test match)
No. (Ove.)	Match number overall (i.e. 122 was the 123rd Test match)
Opposition	The team England was playing against
Venue	The cricket ground where the match was played
(H)	Home ground
(A)	Away ground
Start date	Starting date of the Test match
Result	Result of the match for England
Series (result)	What series the match was part of, with the result listed in brackets; England's tally first (i.e. (2–1) means that England won two matches, and their opponents won one match)

== Matches ==
England Test cricket results between 1877 and 1914
No. (Eng.)	No. (Ove.)	Opposition (Note: Prior to Australian federation in 1901, there was no national flag of Australia. Prior to the unification of the South African colonies in 1910, there was no national flag of South Africa.)	Venue	Start date	Result	Series (result)
1	1	Australia	Melbourne Cricket Ground, Melbourne (A)	15 March 1877	Lost by 45 runs	English cricket team in Australia and New Zealand in 1876–77 (1–1)
2	2	Australia	Melbourne Cricket Ground, Melbourne (A)	31 March 1877	Won by 4 wickets	English cricket team in Australia and New Zealand in 1876–77 (1–1)
3	3	Australia	Melbourne Cricket Ground, Melbourne (A)	2 January 1879	Lost by 10 wickets	English cricket team in Australia and New Zealand in 1878–79 (0–1)
4	4	Australia	The Oval, London (H)	6 September 1880	Won by 5 wickets	Australian cricket team in England in 1880 (1–0)
5	5	Australia	Melbourne Cricket Ground, Melbourne (A)	31 December 1881	Match drawn	English cricket team in Australia and New Zealand in 1881–82 (0–2)
6	6	Australia	Sydney Cricket Ground, Sydney (A)	17 February 1882	Lost by 5 wickets	English cricket team in Australia and New Zealand in 1881–82 (0–2)
7	7	Australia	Sydney Cricket Ground, Sydney (A)	3 March 1882	Lost by 6 wickets	English cricket team in Australia and New Zealand in 1881–82 (0–2)
8	8	Australia	Melbourne Cricket Ground, Melbourne (A)	10 March 1882	Match drawn	English cricket team in Australia and New Zealand in 1881–82 (0–2)
9	9	Australia	The Oval, London (H)	28 August 1882	Lost by 7 runs	Australian cricket team in England in 1882 (0–1)
10	10	Australia	Melbourne Cricket Ground, Melbourne (A)	30 December 1882	Lost by 9 wickets	1882–83 Ashes series (1–2)
11	11	Australia	Melbourne Cricket Ground, Melbourne (A)	19 January 1883	Won by an innings and 27 runs	1882–83 Ashes series (1–2)
12	12	Australia	Sydney Cricket Ground, Sydney (A)	26 January 1883	Won by 69 runs	1882–83 Ashes series (1–2)
13	13	Australia	Sydney Cricket Ground, Sydney (A)	17 February 1883	Lost by 4 wickets	English cricket team in Australia in 1882–83 (0–1)
14	14	Australia	Old Trafford, Manchester (H)	10 July 1884	Match drawn	1884 Ashes series (1–0)
15	15	Australia	Lord's, London (H)	21 July 1884	Won by an innings and 5 runs	1884 Ashes series (1–0)
16	16	Australia	The Oval, London (H)	11 August 1884	Match drawn	1884 Ashes series (1–0)
17	17	Australia	Adelaide Oval, Adelaide (A)	12 December 1884	Won by 8 wickets	1884–85 Ashes series (3–2)
18	18	Australia	Melbourne Cricket Ground, Melbourne (A)	1 January 1885	Won by 10 wickets	1884–85 Ashes series (3–2)
19	19	Australia	Sydney Cricket Ground, Sydney (A)	20 February 1885	Lost by 6 runs	1884–85 Ashes series (3–2)
20	20	Australia	Sydney Cricket Ground, Sydney (A)	14 March 1885	Lost by 8 wickets	1884–85 Ashes series (3–2)
21	21	Australia	Melbourne Cricket Ground, Melbourne (A)	21 March 1885	Won by an innings and 98 runs	1884–85 Ashes series (3–2)
22	22	Australia	Old Trafford, Manchester (H)	5 July 1886	Won by 4 wickets	1886 Ashes series (3–0)
23	23	Australia	Lord's, London (H)	19 July 1886	Won by an innings and 106 runs	1886 Ashes series (3–0)
24	24	Australia	The Oval, London (H)	12 August 1886	Won by an innings and 217 runs	1886 Ashes series (3–0)
25	25	Australia	Sydney Cricket Ground, Sydney (A)	28 January 1887	Won by 13 runs	1886–87 Ashes series (2–0)
26	26	Australia	Sydney Cricket Ground, Sydney (A)	25 February 1887	Won by 71 runs	1886–87 Ashes series (2–0)
27	27	Australia	Sydney Cricket Ground, Sydney (A)	10 February 1888	Won by 126 runs	1887–88 Ashes series (1–0)
28	28	Australia	Lord's, London (H)	16 July 1888	Lost by 61 runs	1888 Ashes series (2–1)
29	29	Australia	The Oval, London (H)	13 August 1888	Won by an innings and 137 runs	1888 Ashes series (2–1)
30	30	Australia	Old Trafford, Manchester (H)	30 August 1888	Won by an innings and 21 runs	1888 Ashes series (2–1)
31	31	South Africa	St George's Park Cricket Ground, Port Elizabeth (A)	12 March 1889	Won by 8 wickets	English cricket team in South Africa in 1888–89 (2–0)
32	32	South Africa	Newlands Cricket Ground, Cape Town (A)	25 March 1889	Won by an innings and 202 runs	English cricket team in South Africa in 1888–89 (2–0)
33	33	Australia	Lord's, London (H)	21 July 1890	Won by 7 wickets	1890 Ashes series (2–0)
34	34	Australia	The Oval, London (H)	11 August 1890	Won by 2 wickets	1890 Ashes series (2–0)
35	35	Australia	Melbourne Cricket Ground, Melbourne (A)	1 January 1892	Lost by 54 runs	1891–92 Ashes series (1–2)
36	36	Australia	Sydney Cricket Ground, Sydney (A)	29 January 1892	Lost by 72 runs	1891–92 Ashes series (1–2)
37	37	South Africa	Newlands Cricket Ground, Cape Town (A)	19 March 1892	Won by an innings and 189 runs	English cricket team in South Africa in 1891–92 (1–0)
38	38	Australia	Adelaide Oval, Adelaide (A)	24 March 1892	Won by an innings and 230 runs	1891–92 Ashes series (1–2)
39	39	Australia	Lord's, London (H)	17 July 1893	Match drawn	1893 Ashes series (1–0)
40	40	Australia	The Oval, London (H)	14 August 1893	Won by an innings and 43 runs	1893 Ashes series (1–0)
41	41	Australia	Old Trafford, Manchester (H)	24 August 1893	Match drawn	1893 Ashes series (1–0)
42	42	Australia	Sydney Cricket Ground, Sydney (A)	14 December 1894	Won by 10 runs	1894–95 Ashes series (3–2)
43	43	Australia	Melbourne Cricket Ground, Melbourne (A)	29 December 1894	Won by 94 runs	1894–95 Ashes series (3–2)
44	44	Australia	Adelaide Oval, Adelaide (A)	11 January 1895	Lost by 382 runs	1894–95 Ashes series (3–2)
45	45	Australia	Sydney Cricket Ground, Sydney (A)	1 February 1895	Lost by an innings and 147 runs	1894–95 Ashes series (3–2)
46	46	Australia	Melbourne Cricket Ground, Melbourne (A)	1 March 1895	Won by 6 wickets	1894–95 Ashes series (3–2)
47	47	South Africa	St George's Park Cricket Ground, Port Elizabeth (A)	13 February 1896	Won by 288 runs	English cricket team in South Africa in 1895–96 (3–0)
48	48	South Africa	Old Wanderers, Johannesburg (A)	2 March 1896	Won by an innings and 197 runs	English cricket team in South Africa in 1895–96 (3–0)
49	49	South Africa	Newlands Cricket Ground, Cape Town (A)	21 March 1896	Won by an innings and 33 runs	English cricket team in South Africa in 1895–96 (3–0)
50	50	Australia	Lord's, London (H)	22 June 1896	Won by 6 wickets	1896 Ashes series (2–1)
51	51	Australia	Old Trafford, Manchester (H)	16 July 1896	Lost by 3 wickets	1896 Ashes series (2–1)
52	52	Australia	The Oval, London (H)	10 August 1896	Won by 66 runs	1896 Ashes series (2–1)
53	53	Australia	Sydney Cricket Ground, Sydney (A)	13 December 1897	Won by 9 wickets	1897–98 Ashes series (1–4)
54	54	Australia	Melbourne Cricket Ground, Melbourne (A)	1 January 1898	Lost by an innings and 55 runs	1897–98 Ashes series (1–4)
55	55	Australia	Adelaide Oval, Adelaide (A)	14 January 1898	Lost by an innings and 13 runs	1897–98 Ashes series (1–4)
56	56	Australia	Melbourne Cricket Ground, Melbourne (A)	29 January 1898	Lost by 8 wickets	1897–98 Ashes series (1–4)
57	57	Australia	Sydney Cricket Ground, Sydney (A)	26 February 1898	Lost by 6 wickets	1897–98 Ashes series (1–4)
58	58	South Africa	Old Wanderers, Johannesburg (A)	14 February 1899	Won by 32 runs	English cricket team in South Africa in 1898–99 (2–0)
59	59	South Africa	Newlands Cricket Ground, Cape Town (A)	1 April 1899	Won by 210 runs	English cricket team in South Africa in 1898–99 (2–0)
60	60	Australia	Trent Bridge, Nottingham (H)	1 June 1899	Match drawn	1899 Ashes series (0–1)
61	61	Australia	Lord's, London (H)	15 June 1899	Lost by 10 wickets	1899 Ashes series (0–1)
62	62	Australia	Headingley, Leeds (H)	29 June 1899	Match drawn	1899 Ashes series (0–1)
63	63	Australia	Old Trafford, Manchester (H)	17 July 1899	Match drawn	1899 Ashes series (0–1)
64	64	Australia	The Oval, London (H)	14 August 1899	Match drawn	1899 Ashes series (0–1)
65	65	Australia	Sydney Cricket Ground, Sydney (A)	13 December 1901	Won by an innings and 124 runs	1901–02 Ashes series (1–4)
66	66	Australia	Melbourne Cricket Ground, Melbourne (A)	1 January 1902	Lost by 229 runs	1901–02 Ashes series (1–4)
67	67	Australia	Adelaide Oval, Adelaide (A)	17 January 1902	Lost by 4 wickets	1901–02 Ashes series (1–4)
68	68	Australia	Sydney Cricket Ground, Sydney (A)	14 February 1902	Lost by 7 wickets	1901–02 Ashes series (1–4)
69	69	Australia	Melbourne Cricket Ground, Melbourne (A)	28 February 1902	Lost by 32 runs	1901–02 Ashes series (1–4)
70	70	Australia	Edgbaston, Birmingham (H)	29 May 1902	Match drawn	1902 Ashes series (1–2)
71	71	Australia	Lord's, London (H)	12 June 1902	Match drawn	1902 Ashes series (1–2)
72	72	Australia	Bramall Lane, Sheffield (H)	3 July 1902	Lost by 143 runs	1902 Ashes series (1–2)
73	73	Australia	Old Trafford, Manchester (H)	24 July 1902	Lost by 3 runs	1902 Ashes series (1–2)
74	74	Australia	The Oval, London (H)	11 August 1902	Won by 1 wicket	1902 Ashes series (1–2)
75	78	Australia	Sydney Cricket Ground, Sydney (A)	11 December 1903	Won by 5 wickets	1903–04 Ashes series (3–2)
76	79	Australia	Melbourne Cricket Ground, Melbourne (A)	1 January 1904	Won by 185 runs	1903–04 Ashes series (3–2)
77	80	Australia	Adelaide Oval, Adelaide (A)	15 January 1904	Lost by 216 runs	1903–04 Ashes series (3–2)
78	81	Australia	Sydney Cricket Ground, Sydney (A)	26 February 1904	Won by 157 runs	1903–04 Ashes series (3–2)
79	82	Australia	Melbourne Cricket Ground, Melbourne (A)	5 March 1904	Lost by 218 runs	1903–04 Ashes series (3–2)
80	83	Australia	Trent Bridge, Nottingham (H)	29 May 1905	Won by 213 runs	1905 Ashes series (2–0)
81	84	Australia	Lord's, London (H)	15 June 1905	Match drawn	1905 Ashes series (2–0)
82	85	Australia	Headingley, Leeds (H)	3 July 1905	Match drawn	1905 Ashes series (2–0)
83	86	Australia	Old Trafford, Manchester (H)	24 July 1905	Won by an innings and 80 runs	1905 Ashes series (2–0)
84	87	Australia	The Oval, London (H)	14 August 1905	Match drawn	1905 Ashes series (2–0)
85	88	South Africa	Old Wanderers, Johannesburg (A)	2 January 1906	Lost by 1 wicket	English cricket team in South Africa in 1905–06 (1–4)
86	89	South Africa	Old Wanderers, Johannesburg (A)	6 March 1906	Lost by 9 wickets	English cricket team in South Africa in 1905–06 (1–4)
87	90	South Africa	Old Wanderers, Johannesburg (A)	10 March 1906	Lost by 243 runs	English cricket team in South Africa in 1905–06 (1–4)
88	91	South Africa	Newlands Cricket Ground, Cape Town (A)	24 March 1906	Won by 4 wickets	English cricket team in South Africa in 1905–06 (1–4)
89	92	South Africa	Newlands Cricket Ground, Cape Town (A)	30 March 1906	Lost by an innings and 16 runs	English cricket team in South Africa in 1905–06 (1–4)
90	93	South Africa	Lord's, London (H)	1 July 1907	Match drawn	South African cricket team in England in 1907 (1–0)
91	94	South Africa	Headingley, Leeds (H)	29 July 1907	Won by 53 runs	South African cricket team in England in 1907 (1–0)
92	95	South Africa	The Oval, London (H)	19 August 1907	Match drawn	South African cricket team in England in 1907 (1–0)
93	96	Australia	Sydney Cricket Ground, Sydney (A)	13 December 1907	Lost by 2 wickets	1907–08 Ashes series (1–4)
94	97	Australia	Melbourne Cricket Ground, Melbourne (A)	1 January 1908	Won by 1 wicket	1907–08 Ashes series (1–4)
95	98	Australia	Adelaide Oval, Adelaide (A)	10 January 1908	Lost by 245 runs	1907–08 Ashes series (1–4)
96	99	Australia	Melbourne Cricket Ground, Melbourne (A)	7 February 1908	Lost by 308 runs	1907–08 Ashes series (1–4)
97	100	Australia	Sydney Cricket Ground, Sydney (A)	21 February 1908	Lost by 49 runs	1907–08 Ashes series (1–4)
98	101	Australia	Edgbaston, Birmingham (H)	27 May 1909	Won by 10 wickets	1909 Ashes series (1–2)
99	102	Australia	Lord's, London (H)	14 June 1909	Lost by 9 wickets	1909 Ashes series (1–2)
100	103	Australia	Headingley, Leeds (H)	1 July 1909	Lost by 126 runs	1909 Ashes series (1–2)
101	104	Australia	Old Trafford, Manchester (H)	26 July 1909	Match drawn	1909 Ashes series (1–2)
102	105	Australia	The Oval, London (H)	9 August 1909	Match drawn	1909 Ashes series (1–2)
103	106	South Africa	Old Wanderers, Johannesburg (A)	1 January 1910	Lost by 19 runs	English cricket team in South Africa in 1909–10 (2–3)
104	107	South Africa	Kingsmead, Durban (A)	21 January 1910	Lost by 95 runs	English cricket team in South Africa in 1909–10 (2–3)
105	108	South Africa	Old Wanderers, Johannesburg (A)	26 February 1910	Won by 3 wickets	English cricket team in South Africa in 1909–10 (2–3)
106	109	South Africa	Newlands Cricket Ground, Cape Town (A)	7 March 1910	Lost by 4 wickets	English cricket team in South Africa in 1909–10 (2–3)
107	110	South Africa	Newlands Cricket Ground, Cape Town (A)	11 March 1910	Won by 9 wickets	English cricket team in South Africa in 1909–10 (2–3)
108	116	Australia	Sydney Cricket Ground, Sydney (A)	15 December 1911	Lost by 146 runs	1911–12 Ashes series (4–1)
109	117	Australia	Melbourne Cricket Ground, Melbourne (A)	30 December 1911	Won by 8 wickets	1911–12 Ashes series (4–1)
110	118	Australia	Adelaide Oval, Adelaide (A)	12 January 1912	Won by 7 wickets	1911–12 Ashes series (4–1)
111	119	Australia	Melbourne Cricket Ground, Melbourne (A)	9 February 1912	Won by an innings and 225 runs	1911–12 Ashes series (4–1)
112	120	Australia	Sydney Cricket Ground, Sydney (A)	23 February 1912	Won by 70 runs	1911–12 Ashes series (4–1)
113	122	South Africa	Lord's, London (H)	10 June 1912	Won by an innings and 62 runs	1912 Triangular Tournament (4–0)
114	123	Australia	Lord's, London (H)	24 June 1912	Match drawn	1912 Triangular Tournament (4–0)
115	124	South Africa	Headingley, Leeds (H)	8 July 1912	Won by 174 runs	1912 Triangular Tournament (4–0)
116	126	Australia	Old Trafford, Manchester (H)	29 July 1912	Match drawn	1912 Triangular Tournament (4–0)
117	128	South Africa	The Oval, London (H)	12 August 1912	Won by 10 wickets	1912 Triangular Tournament (4–0)
118	129	Australia	The Oval, London (H)	19 August 1912	Won by 244 runs	1912 Triangular Tournament (4–0)
119	130	South Africa	Kingsmead, Durban (A)	13 December 1913	Won by an innings and 157 runs	English cricket team in South Africa in 1913–14 (4–0)
120	131	South Africa	Old Wanderers, Johannesburg (A)	26 December 1913	Won by an innings and 12 runs	English cricket team in South Africa in 1913–14 (4–0)
121	132	South Africa	Old Wanderers, Johannesburg (A)	1 January 1914	Won by 91 runs	English cricket team in South Africa in 1913–14 (4–0)
122	133	South Africa	Kingsmead, Durban (A)	14 February 1914	Match drawn	English cricket team in South Africa in 1913–14 (4–0)
123	134	South Africa	St George's Park Cricket Ground, Port Elizabeth (A)	27 February 1914	Won by 10 wickets	English cricket team in South Africa in 1913–14 (4–0)

== Summary ==
Team	Total matches					Home matches					Away matches				
Team	Mat	Won	Lost	Draw	W/L	Mat	Won	Lost	Draw	W/L	Mat	Won	Lost	Draw	W/L
Australia	94	40	35	19	1.142	42	17	8	17	2.125	52	23	27	2	0.851
South Africa	29	19	7	3	2.714	6	4	0	2	–	23	15	7	1	2.142
Total	123	59	42	22	1.404	48	21	8	19	2.625	75	38	34	3	1.117
