= Allan Steel =

Allan Steel may refer to:

- A. G. Steel (Allan Gibson Steel, 1858–1914), English amateur cricketer
- Allan Ivo Steel (1892–1917), his son, English cricketer and soldier

== See also ==
- Alan Steel (1935–2015), Italian bodybuilder and actor
- Allen Steele (born 1958), American journalist and science fiction author
