= English cricket teams in Australia and New Zealand in 1887–88 =

International cricket tour

Two English cricket teams toured Australia in 1887–88. They are generally known as A. Shrewsbury's XI and G. F. Vernon's XI. Shrewsbury's XI also visited New Zealand in March.

In previous Australian seasons, no more than one English team had toured. The formation of two teams in 1887-88 was described by Wisden as "a piece of folly (that) will never be perpetrated again". The situation was perhaps inevitable given that English cricket still lacked a formal system to regulate the organisation of overseas tours. As a result, any promoter was free to form a team.

Wisden pointed out that "it was clear from the first that two combinations would not be able to pay their way, and, though we do not know the exact result of Shaw, Shrewsbury, and Lillywhite's venture, the Melbourne Club frankly admitted a heavy loss over Mr Vernon's team".

== A Shrewsbury's XI ==
This team was formed by James Lillywhite, Alfred Shaw and Arthur Shrewsbury after they received an invitation from various parties in Sydney. The players were a mixture of amateur and professional. Although the professional Shrewsbury was effectively the player/manager, the amateur Aubrey Smith was appointed team captain.

Shaw himself did not tour, but stayed at home to put together a football side that played rugby union and Victorian rules (now known as Australian rules) football in Australia after the cricket tour. The tour was a financial disaster, with the Melbourne Cricket Club, Lillywhite, Shaw and Shrewsbury well out-of-pocket. Lillywhite defaulted on his debt.

The team played seven first-class matches in Australia including two versus an Australia XI. They played New South Wales three times and individual matches versus Victoria and a Combined XI. After the matches in Australia were completed, the team visited New Zealand and played three non-first-class matches, which were all drawn. In all matches in both countries, Shrewsbury's XI played 25, won 14, drew 9 and lost 2. In first-class matches (in Australia only), the team played 7, won 5 and lost 2.

The team members were (amateurs denoted by title):

- Mr C A Smith, captain (Sussex)
- Arthur Shrewsbury (Notts)
- George A Lohmann (Surrey)
- J Maurice Read (Surrey)
- John Briggs (Lancashire)
- Richard Pilling (Lancashire)
- George Ulyett (Yorkshire)
- Joseph M Preston (Yorkshire)
- Mr W Newham (Sussex)
- Mr George Brann (Sussex)
- Mr L C Docker (Warwickshire)
- A D Pougher (Leicestershire)
- James Lillywhite (Sussex)

== G F Vernon's XI ==
Lord Hawke, then known as the Hon. M B Hawke, was invited by Melbourne Cricket Club to form this team which, like Shrewsbury's, comprised both amateurs and professionals. Hawke had to return to England at the start of the tour as his father had died, leaving George Vernon to captain the side.

Vernon's XI played eight first-class matches in Australia including two versus an Australia XI. They played twice versus each of New South Wales, South Australia and Victoria. The team visited Australia only and in all matches played 26, won 11, drew 14 and lost 1. In first-class matches, the team played 8, won 6, drew 1 and lost 1.

The team members were (amateurs denoted by title):

- Mr G F Vernon, captain (Middlesex)
- The Hon M B (now Lord) Hawke (Yorkshire)
- Mr W W Read (Surrey)
- Mr M P Bowden (Surrey)
- Mr A E Stoddart (Middlesex)
- Mr A E Newton (Somerset)
- Mr T C O'Brien (Middlesex)
- William Bates (Yorkshire)
- Robert Peel (Yorkshire)
- J T Rawlin (Yorkshire)
- William Attewell (Notts)
- John Beaumont (Surrey)
- Robert Abel (Surrey)

== Test Match ==
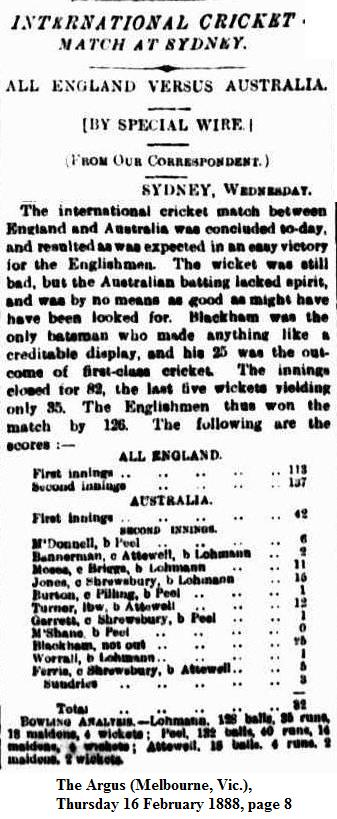
Newspaper article describing England's win in the test match.

Each team played "Combined Australia" sides in matches that are not accorded Test match status. In February 1888 the two touring teams combined as an England team, with Walter Read as captain, to play a timeless Test against Australia at the Sydney Cricket Ground. England won by 126 runs.

England's team in the Test match was: Walter Read (captain), Arthur Shrewsbury, Andrew Stoddart, George Ulyett, Maurice Read, Bobby Peel, Billy Newham, George Lohmann, Johnny Briggs, William Attewell and Dick Pilling (wk). Australia's team was: Alec Bannerman, Sammy Jones, Harry Moses, Frederick Burton, Jack Worrall, Patrick McShane, Percy McDonnell, Jack Blackham, Tom Garrett, Charlie Turner, John Ferris. Wisden doubted if the Australian team was truly representative.

The match was affected by wet weather and was low-scoring. Australia won the toss and decided to field. This probably looked like the right decision as Ferris and Turner took 9 wickets between them to dismiss England for 113, Arthur Shrewsbury top-scoring with 44. When Australia batted, Lohmann and Peel, bowling unchanged, reduced them to 35 for 8 at stumps on the first day. As a result of continuing rain, and an intervening Sunday, there was no play for three days. On resumption, Lohmann and Peel dismissed Australia for 42. Turner took 7 for 43 as England then set Australia 209 to win. They fell well short with Lohmann and Peel sharing 8 wickets and England won by 126 runs.

=== Match summary ===
10–15 February 1888
(Timeless Test)
Scorecard

| England | v | Australia |
| 113 (100 overs); A Shrewsbury 44 (150); CTB Turner 5/44 (50 overs) | | 42 (37.3 overs); TW Garrett 10 (26); GA Lohmann 5/17 (19 overs) |
| 137 (75 overs); JM Read 39 (49); CTB Turner 7/43 (38 overs) | | 82 (69.2 overs); JM Blackham 25 (54); GA Lohmann 4/35 (32 overs) |

England won by 126 runs
Sydney Cricket Ground, Sydney
Umpires: C Bannerman and J Phillips

- Australia won the toss and elected to field.
- 12 February was taken as a rest day.
- There was no play on the second or third days.
- AE Stoddart and W Newham (ENG) made their Test debuts.

== Bibliography ==
- Chris Harte, A History of Australian Cricket, Andre Deutsch, 1993
- Wisden Cricketers' Almanack 1889
