= English cricket team in Australia in 1886–87 =

International cricket tour

The England cricket team in Australia in 1886–87, generally known as Alfred Shaw's XI, was described by Wisden as "one of the strongest that ever left England for the Colonies". The team played 10 first-class matches, winning 6 with 2 draws and 2 defeats (both against New South Wales). It was the 9th English team to visit Australia, the first tour having occurred in the summer of 1861–62.

== Background of the Tour ==
Since the 1860s there had been five visits by Australian teams to England. These tours were lucrative for the players and organisers involved and immensely popular in England. During the visit of the eighth English team to Australia in summer of 1884-1885 Lord Harris, the former English captain (of the 1878-79 tour to Australia) and now an administrator, had suggested to the powerful Melbourne Cricket Club that they send a team to England for the summer of 1886, and this would be known as an Australian team. Throughout the Australian summer of 1884-85 there was conflict between the Australian colonial Associations over the selection and organisation of this Australian team. There were also pay disputes with the team from the first test being replaced by an entirely new team for the second test. Former player Tom Horan stated that the "Melbourne Cricket Club had become the leading cricket club in Australia and stands alone in influence, wealth, power and position." Cricket writer David Montefiore stated that there was a near total collapse in support for the emerging institution of Anglo-Australian cricket. Eventually the team to travel to England was selected on an amateur basis with some prominent professional players being left out. The 1886 Australian team to England performed poorly. The team lost all three test matches and won only nine of 39 matches. There were also reports of ill discipline and poor behaviour by some of the Australian players. The prominent sports journal The Referee reported "never since Australian cricketers became prominent in the world’s esteem have they met with such an overwhelming defeat as that which the MCC Eleven has sustained in England." However the tour was a financial success with the Melbourne Club making a profit of £1083.

== Origin of the Tour ==
During the tour 1886 tour to England the Melbourne Cricket Club's secretary Ben Wardill entered into negotiations with the Marylebone Cricket Club (MCC) to bring an English XI to Australia for the forthcoming Australian summer. Whilst negotiating with the MCC, Wardill discovered that the prominent English cricketers Shaw, Shrewsbury and Lillywhite were organising a team of their own, all professionals, to tour Australia. Wardill was asked to intervene with the trio and ask them to postpone their visit so that two English teams would not visit at the same time. Wardill failed in this task and was instructed to cease negotiations on an MCC visit. Shaw & Co., "who through the medium of the Press and otherwise made some very caustic remarks upon the action of the popular M.C.C. Secretary. They claimed that they were the first to propose bringing a team to the colonies for the coming season and offered to refer the question to arbitration." Arrangements with the Shaw group for their team to visit for 1886–87 season were then entered into by the Melbourne Cricket Club and the Australian associations.

== Test series summary ==
=== First Test ===
28–31 January 1887
(Timeless Test)
Scorecard

England	v	Australia
45 (35.3 overs); GA Lohmann 17; CTB Turner 6/15 (18 overs)		119 (113.1 overs); H Moses 31; SP Jones 31; RG Barlow 3/25 (35 overs)
184 (136.2 overs); J Briggs 33; JJ Ferris 5/76 (61 overs)		97 (107 overs); H Moses 24; W Barnes 6/28 (46 overs)

England won by 13 runs
Sydney Cricket Ground, Sydney
Umpires: C Bannerman and Elisha Rawlinson

- Australia won the toss and elected to field.
- 30 January was taken as a rest day.
- W Gunn and M Sherwin (ENG), and H Moses, CTB Turner and JJ Ferris (AUS) made their test debuts.

=== Second Test ===
25 February–1 March 1887
(Timeless Test)
Scorecard

England	v	Australia
151 (109 overs); W Flowers 37; CTB Turner 5/41 (53 overs)		84 (55.1 overs); H Moses 28; GA Lohmann 8/35 (27.1 overs)
154 (140.1 overs); RG Barlow 42; CTB Turner 4/52 (64.1 overs)		150 (110 overs); PS McDonnell 35; W Bates 4/26 (26 overs)

England won by 71 runs
Sydney Cricket Ground, Sydney
Umpires: C Bannerman and J Swift

- England won the toss and elected to bat.
- 27 February was taken as a rest day.
- R Wood (ENG), and WF Giffen, JJ Lyons, RC Allen, JT Cottam and FJ Burton (AUS) made their Test debuts.

== Team members ==
The party comprised 13 players, all of them professionals: Arthur Shrewsbury, Billy Barnes, William Gunn, William Scotton, Wilfred Flowers, Mordecai Sherwin and Alfred Shaw (all Nottinghamshire); Dick Barlow and Johnny Briggs (both Lancashire); George Lohmann and Maurice Read (both Surrey); Billy Bates (Yorkshire); and James Lillywhite (Sussex).

== Bibliography ==
- Cashman, R., and Franks, W., ‘England’ in, The Oxford Companion to Australian Cricket, Oxford University Press, Oxford, 1996, pp. 162–167.
- Evening Journal Adelaide, 30 October 1886, p. 6. Retrieved from https://trove.nla.gov.au/newspaper/article/197827567?browse=ndp%3Abrowse%2Ftitle%2FE%2Ftitle%2F966%2F1886%2F10%2F30%2Fpage%2F22400178%2Farticle%2F197827567
- Harte, C., & Whimpress, D., A History of Australian Cricket, Andre Deustch, London, 2003, Second Edition
- Montefiore, D., Cricket in the Doldrums: The Struggle between Public and Private Control of Australia Cricket in the 1880s, ASSH Studies, no. 8, Sydney 1992.
- Ross, J., and Hutchinson, G., 200 Seasons of Australian Cricket, Ironbark, Pan McMillan, Sydney 1997
- The Referee, Sydney, 29 October 1886, p. 4. Retrieved from https://trove.nla.gov.au/newspaper/article/127590544?browse=ndp%3Abrowse%2Ftitle%2FR%2Ftitle%2F499%2F1886%2F10%2F20%2Fpage%2F12821973%2Farticle%2F127590544
- Wisden Cricketers' Almanack 1888
