= Harold Steel =

English cricketer

Harold Banner Steel (9 April 1862 – 29 June 1911) was an English cricketer active from 1883 to 1896 who played for Lancashire and Cambridge University. He was born in Liverpool and died in Burnham-on-Sea. He appeared in 36 first-class matches as a righthanded batsman who bowled right arm medium pace. He scored 1,042 runs with a highest score of 100 and held 20 catches. He took one wicket with a best analysis of one for 15.

Harold Steel was the third of four brothers who played for Lancashire: Douglas, A. G., himself and Ernest. Harold followed Douglas to Uppingham School and, when Douglas left in 1875, Harold was withdrawn from the school because of a typhoid epidemic in the area, caused by a poorly maintained water system. The headmaster, Edward Thring, relocated the whole school to Borth in Wales for over a year until the danger was past. Harold Steel did not return to Uppingham. Instead, he went to Repton where he was in the First XI in 1879 and 1880, making a good reputation as a batsman. Having been at Trinity Hall, Cambridge, for three years, he played sporadically for Lancashire from 1883 to 1896. He preferred good-class club cricket in which he appeared for Liverpool Cricket Club, Quidnuncs and others.
