= Ernest Steel =

English cricketer

Ernest Eden Steel (25 June 1864 – 14 July 1941) was an English cricketer active from 1884 to 1904 who played for Lancashire and in India for the Europeans. He was born in West Derby and died in Southport. He appeared in 47 first-class matches as a righthanded batsman who bowled right arm slow pace. He scored 1,133 runs with a highest score of 111 and held 41 catches with one stumping. He took 131 wickets with a best analysis of eight for 32. He was the youngest of the four Steel brothers who all played for Lancashire: Douglas, A. G., Harold and himself.
