= John Cottam =

Australian cricketer

Jack Cottam
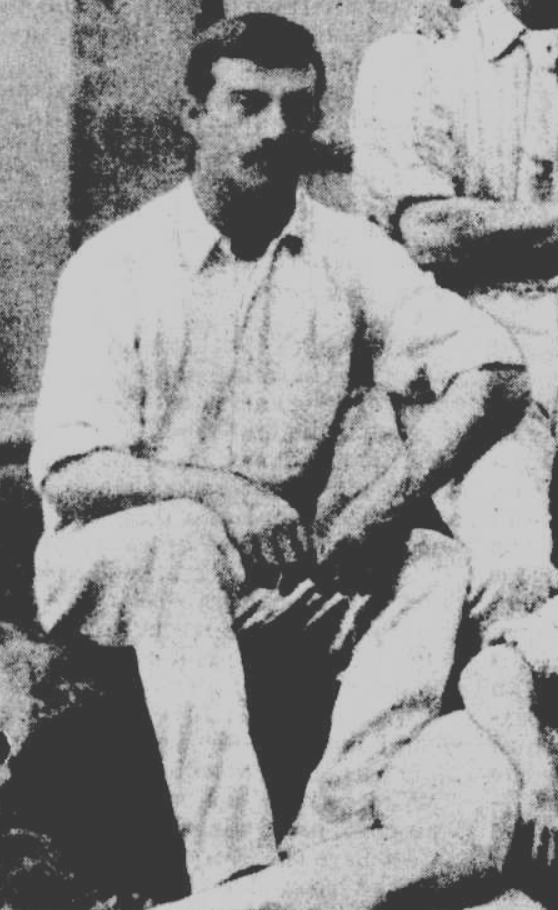

Personal information
- Full name: John Thomas Cottam
- Born: 5 September 1867; Sydney, New South Wales, Australia
- Died: 30 January 1897 (aged 29); Coolgardie, Western Australia
- Batting: Right-handed
- Bowling: Legbreak

International information
- National side: Australia
- Only Test (cap 49): 25 February 1887 v England

Career statistics
Competition	Tests	First-class
Matches	1	7
Runs scored	4	273
Batting average	2.00	22.75
100s/50s	0/0	0/3
Top score	3	62
Balls bowled	0	175
Wickets	0	3
Bowling average	–	32.66
5 wickets in innings	0	0
10 wickets in match	0	0
Best bowling	–	2/48
Catches/stumpings	1/0	4/0
- Source: Cricinfo, 19 October 2025

John Thomas Cottam (5 September 1867 – 30 January 1897) was an Australian cricketer who played in one Test match in 1887.

Jack Cottam had played in only one first-class match – for New South Wales against the touring English cricket team, when he scored 29 and 14 not out – before making his Test debut a few days later in the Second Test against England at the Sydney Cricket Ground. Cottam made just four runs as Australia lost by 71 runs. Cottam's five other first-class matches came on New South Wales' tour of New Zealand in 1889–90, when he was the most successful batsman: he made three fifties including his highest score of 62, the only fifty in the match, when New South Wales beat Wellington.

Cottam was a talented batsman – "style, strokes, physique, and a happy, sanguine temperament were all his" – but he did not seek to make the most of his cricketing ability. He went to the West Australian goldfields, where he died of typhoid fever in hospital at Coolgardie in January 1897, aged 29.
