= Henry Tylecote =

English cricketer and educator

Personal information
- Full name: Henry Grey Tylecote
- Born: 24 July 1853; Marston Moreteyne, Bedfordshire, England
- Died: 8 March 1935 (aged 81); Summertown, Oxfordshire, England
- Batting: Right-handed
- Bowling: Right-arm roundarm medium
- Role: Wicket-keeper
- Relatives: Edward Tylecote (brother)

Domestic team information
- Years: Team
- 1874–1877: Oxford University
- 1879–1886: Marylebone Cricket Club
- 1900: Hertfordshire

Career statistics
Competition	First-class
Matches	29
Runs scored	442
Batting average	11.94
100s/50s	–/1
Top score	54
Balls bowled	1,839
Wickets	45
Bowling average	17.24
5 wickets in innings	3
10 wickets in match	–
Best bowling	8/51
Catches/stumpings	25/5
- Source: Cricinfo, 8 July 2019

Henry Grey Tylecote (24 July 1853 – 8 March 1935) was an English first-class cricketer and educator. Tylecote appeared in 29 first-class matches between 1874 and 1886, playing the majority of these for Oxford University, as well as appearing for the Marylebone Cricket Club amongst others.

== Early life and varsity cricket ==
The son of the Reverend Thomas B. D. Tylecote and his wife, Elizabeth Tylecote (née Fereday), he was born in the rectory at Marston Moreteyne in July 1853. He was educated at Clifton College, before going up to New College, Oxford. While studying at Oxford, he made his debut in first-class cricket for Oxford University against the Marylebone Cricket Club (MCC) at Oxford in 1874. He played first-class cricket for Oxford University until 1877, making nineteen first-class appearances. He scored a total of 219 runs in these matches, with a high score of 39, while with the ball he took 34 wickets at an average of 13.00, with best figures of 8 for 51. These figures, one of three five wicket hauls he took, came against the MCC in 1877. Playing as the Oxford wicket-keeper, he also took 19 catches and made 5 stumpings.

While at Oxford, he also played a single first-class match for a combined Oxford and Cambridge Universities Past and Present cricket team against the Gentlemen of England in 1874. He won a blue in cricket for all four of his years playing for Oxford. While at Oxford, Tylecote was also prominent in the athletics club as a half-mile and mile runner. He finished second to the Cambridge runner the 1877 mile race.

== Later life and first-class cricket ==
In 1877, he featured for the Gentlemen in the Gentlemen v Players fixture at Chelsea. Two years later he featured for the South in the North v South fixture, played for the benefit of James Southerton. He first featured for the MCC in 1877, and would feature in four first-class matches for them until 1886. He made additional first-class appearances for the Old Oxonians in 1881 (recording his only first-class half century), for the South in the North v South fixture of 1883, and for I Zingari in 1886. Tylecote made a total of 29 first-class appearances, scoring 442 runs and taking 45 wickets.

Having graduated from Oxford in 1877, he became a schoolteacher. He taught at the Golden Parsonage Preparatory School and at Elstree School, where he taught alongside Vernon Royle. He later played minor counties cricket for Hertfordshire in 1900, making a single appearance in the Minor Counties Championship. He died at Summertown in Oxford in March 1935. His brother, Edward, played Test cricket for England.
