= Ted Elliott (umpire) =

Australian cricketer and Test match umpire

Edward Hudspeth Elliott (19 April 1851 – 19 March 1885) was an Australian Victorian first-class cricketer, best known as a wicket-keeper and Test match umpire.

== History ==
Elliott was born in Sunderland, Tyne and Wear, England, and arrived in Victoria at the age of one. At some point he became a builder and carpenter in partnership with his father as Elliott & Son. He was a prominent member of the East Melbourne Cricket Club from 1871. He was regularly described as "little", but never in a derogatory way:

Little Elliott, the East Melbourne wicket-keeper, has made rapid strides in his batting this season, but he can't yet manage [Frank] Allan, and when that bowler opposes him his light is exceedingly dim, and the scorers have to write a round 0 to his name. In Sydney, when [Edwin] Evans played such havoc among the Victorian wickets. Elliott played him well and pluckily, and in several good matches at Melbourne he has performed more than creditably. His wicket-keeping for his club, East Melbourne, has been of great assistance to them in their struggles for the Challenge Cup.

He played eight matches for Victoria as a right-hand batsman, scoring 117 runs at an average of 8.35 with a highest score of 20 not out. He also kept wickets, taking 13 catches and 8 stumpings. His most memorable game was against New South Wales in December 1880 when Elliott and Frank Allan (neither known as a batsman, being wicket-keeper and bowler respectively) were responsible for saving the match, creating a near-riot.

Elliott umpired seven Test matches, and was the first Australian to regularly officiate. He made his debut in the match between Australia and England in Melbourne on 30 December 1882 to 2 January 1883. In this series he and John Swift stood in all four Test matches, the first time two umpires had officiated throughout an entire series. Moyes commented that "apparently we had reached the time when some kind of qualification was required and some consistency in appointment was observed." Elliott also umpired in three matches in the 1884–85 series and died two days after his last appearance, of a cerebral embolism (stroke). He died at Carlton North, Victoria.

== Personal ==
Elliott was a leading member of the United Ancient Order of Druids friendly society, in 1885 eight-time secretary and past president of Una Lodge No. 105. (Note: One Mark Elliott (died c. 18 August 1881), carpenter and joiner and licensee of the Clyde Hotel, Carlton, was a member of the same lodge, but it has not been determined whether they were related.)

Elliott married Annie Elizabeth Selina Isabel Hartley (died 9 July 1931) in 1873. Their children included Arthur, Isabella, George, Rachel "Ray", Mark Edward, (Note: Mark Edward Elliott (born 1881), describing himself as carpenter and joiner, enlisted with the First AIF on 12 March 1915, aged 33. He married Daisy Ruby Bending on 30 July 1918, having been discharged as medically unfit (shell shock). He died on 18 April 1945.) Amy, Una and Ettie. He died at his home, Freeman Street, North Carlton. Annie married again in 1889, to Albert Edward Foster (died 5 January 1947) of "Hillside", Sunbury, Victoria. They settled at 75 Curtain Street, North Carlton.

The past season will always bring back sad recollections to those who knew poor little Ned Elliott as I knew him. His death at the early age of 32 cast a gloom over the whole cricketing community, which was not to be wondered at, for in his removal from our midst we lost one whose place it will be hard to fill, and whose sterling worth and integrity gained for him universal respect.

== Sources ==
- Pollard, Jack, Australian Cricket: 1803–1893, The Formative Years. Sydney, The Book Company, 1995. (ISBN 0-207-15490-2)
- Moyes, A. G., Australian Cricket: A History, Sydney, Angus & Robertson, 1959.
