= Henry Keigwin =

English cricketer

Henry David Keigwin (14 May 1881 – 20 September 1916) was an English cricketer. He was born in Lexden, in Colchester and died near Thiepval, France. He was educated at Clifton College, along with his brothers R. P. Keigwin and Herbert Keigwin

Keigwin, whose brothers R. P. Keigwin and Herbert Keigwin also played first-class cricket, played for Essex and Scotland in his three years of first-class cricket between 1906 and 1909. He scored 77 and 27 for the Gentlemen of England against Surrey in April 1906, W.G. Grace's final first-class appearance. He returned from Africa to serve with the Lancashire Fusiliers at the outbreak of hostilities in the Great War and died on the Western Front.

== Other teams ==
- Gentlemen of England (1905–1908)
- Miscellaneous Scotland (1906)
- Scottish Counties (1910)
