= R. P. Keigwin =

English academic and sportsman

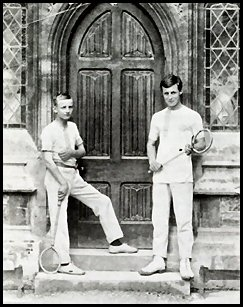
Keigwin (right) with A. E. J. Collins at Clifton College, about 1902

Richard Prescott Keigwin (/ˈkɛɡwɪn/ KEG-win; 8 April 1883 – 26 November 1972) was an English schoolmaster, sportsman, translator, and author. He played first-class cricket for Cambridge University, the Marylebone Cricket Club, Essex, and Gloucestershire, and hockey for Essex and England.

After teaching at the Royal Naval College, Osborne, he was a naval officer during the First World War, then a master at Clifton College, and was notable for his translations from the work of Hans Christian Andersen.

== Early life ==
Keigwin was born in Lexden in Essex and educated at Clifton College, Bristol, in Watson's House. While there, he partnered A. E. J. Collins in the school racquets pair and was also the school racquets captain. He also captained the school cricket XI of 1902, in which Collins also played.

He then joined Peterhouse, Cambridge, where in March 1903 he was runner-up at the Cambridge University's Freshmen's Lawn Tennis Tournament, losing in the final in two straight sets to the future Wimbledon champion Tony Wilding without winning a game.

He represented Cambridge University at cricket, rackets, soccer, and hockey, and also played for the Marylebone Cricket Club.

Keigwin's best bowling figures in first-class cricket were 8/79 against Sussex in 1903. A year later, he scored his only first-class hundred, for Cambridge against Warwickshire.

In 1906 he graduated BA in the Classics and Modern Languages Tripos, later promoted by seniority to MA.

After leaving Cambridge, Keigwin taught modern languages at the Royal Naval College, Osborne.

His brothers, Herbert Keigwin and Henry Keigwin both also played first-class cricket.

== First World War ==
In 1914, Keigwin was commissioned as a Lieutenant into the Royal Naval Volunteer Reserve. He served in the First World War on the battlecruiser HMS Indomitable and was stationed off the Belgian coast. He was present at the surrender of the Imperial German Navy fleet.

He was created a Chevalier of Belgian Order of Léopold, Knight of the Order of the Dannebrog by HM King Christian X of Denmark and awarded King Christian X's medal for "Valuable assistance rendered to Denmark during the war."

== Later career ==
After the war, Keigwin returned to his old school, Clifton College, as an assistant master from 1919, and was House Tutor of Watson's House (his own old house) in 1919 and 1920. From then until 1935 he was the housemaster of Dakyns' House.

He was the editor of The Granta in 1919.

In the 1920s, Keigwin played hockey for Essex and England, cricket and tennis for Gloucestershire. He also played for the Free Foresters against the Netherlands cricket XI, although he did not appear for Free Foresters at first-class level.

In 1935, Keigwin published his first translation from the work of Hans Christian Andersen and also became Warden of Wills Hall at the University of Bristol, where he remained for ten years.

In retirement, Keigwin spent some years living in Denmark, where as a result of his interest in Danish cricket the game picked up. English cricket teams began visiting Denmark more frequently, and these teams included the Marylebone Cricket Club, Leicestershire, Incogniti, Gentlemen of Worcestershire, and Sir Julien Cahn's XI.

He was President of the Old Cliftonian Society from 1957 to 1959, and also became a Governor of Clifton College.

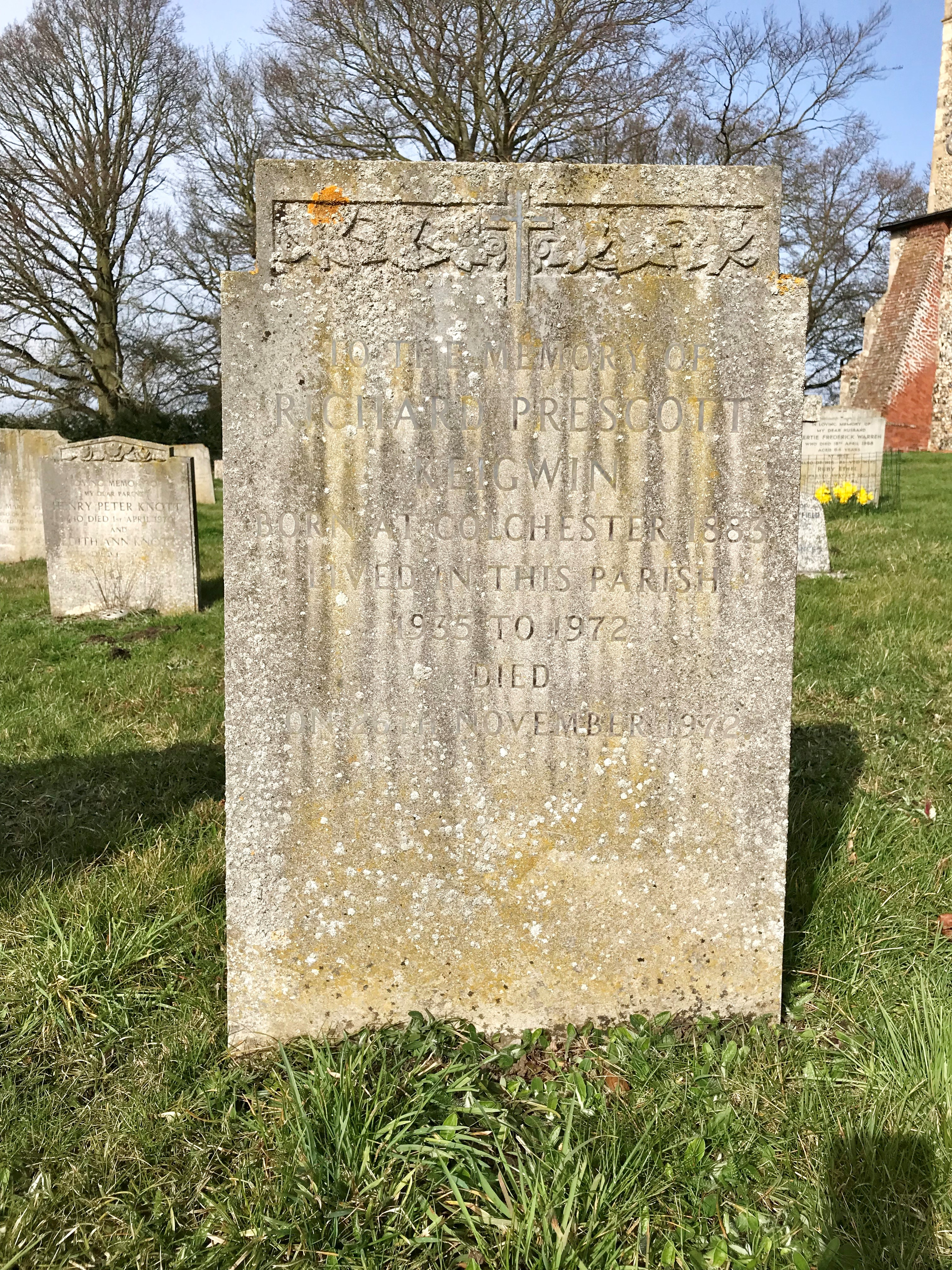
The grave of R. P. Keigwin in the churchyard of St Mary, Polstead, Suffolk

Keigwin died at Polstead, Suffolk, and is buried there in St Mary's churchyard.

== Published works ==
- Lanyard Lyrics (1914)
- Lyrics for Sport (1917)

Keigwin was a noted translator of Danish into English:

- Four Tales from Hans Andersen (1935)
- Kaj Munk, Playwright, Priest and Patriot (1944)
- The Jutland Wind (1944)
- In Denmark I Was Born (1948)
- Denmark, Land of Beauty (1950)
- Fairy Tales by Hans Christian Andersen (3 volumes, 1950)
- Tales the Moon Can Tell by Andersen (1955)
- Heinemann's Illustrated Hans Andersen Series (1955)
- Seven Tales from Hans Christian Andersen (1961)
- Five Plays (1964)
- The Ugly Duckling by Andersen (1973)
- The Snow Queen: A Story in Seven Parts by Andersen (1975)
- 80 Fairy Tales by Andersen (1976)

Keigwin also contributed to Centenary Essays on Clifton College (1962).
