= Dick Barlow =

English cricketer (1851–1919)

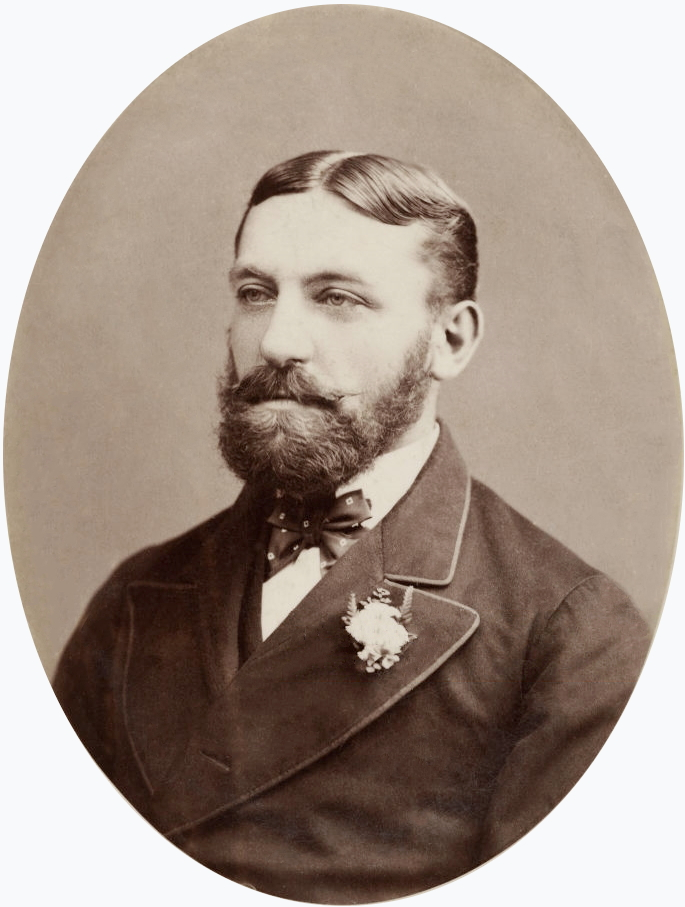
- Barlow in 1882

Personal information
- Full name: Richard Gorton Barlow
- Born: 28 May 1851; Bolton, England
- Died: 31 July 1919 (aged 68); Blackpool, England
- Batting: Right-handed
- Bowling: Left-arm medium

International information
- National side: England
- Test debut (cap 29): 31 December 1881 v Australia
- Last Test: 1 March 1887 v Australia

Domestic team information
- Years: Team
- 1871–1891: Lancashire

Umpiring information
- Tests umpired: 1 (1899)

Career statistics
Competition	Test	First-class
Matches	17	351
Runs scored	591	11,217
Batting average	22.73	20.61
100s/50s	0/2	4/39
Top score	62	117
Balls bowled	2,456	43,468
Wickets	34	950
Bowling average	22.55	14.52
5 wickets in innings	3	66
10 wickets in match	0	14
Best bowling	7/40	9/39
Catches/stumpings	14/–	268/–
- Source: CricketArchive, 2 October 2009

Richard Gorton Barlow (28 May 1851 – 31 July 1919) was a cricketer who played for Lancashire and England. Barlow is best remembered for his batting partnership with A N Hornby, which was immortalised in nostalgic poetry by Francis Thompson. He was also an umpire and a football referee, including at the record 26–0 score between Preston North End and Hyde in the FA Cup.

== Overview ==
Cricket was engrained in Barlow from an early age, and he went on to play for Lancashire for 20 years and continued to play at lower levels into his sixties. He left school aged fourteen to work in a printing office as an apprentice compositor. He was later an iron moulder with Dobson & Barlow in Bolton, and then in 1865 he moved to Derbyshire when his father got work at the Staveley Iron Works. It was for Staveley Iron Works Cricket Club that Barlow first played cricket, becoming a cricket professional with Farsley in Leeds in 1871, which was the year in which he first played for Lancashire. From 1873 to 1877 he was the professional for Saltaire in Bradford. Barlow played one match for Derbyshire in the 1875 season against a United North of England Eleven.

Barlow was 5 ft 8 inches tall and weighed approximately eleven stone. He was strong and sturdily built. He was known for his defensive batting, which made it hard to dismiss him, and which earned him the nickname Stonewaller. On one occasion he scored no runs in a partnership of 45 with A. N. Hornby, who was dismissed for 44. He holds the world first-class record for the lowest score by a batsman carrying his bat: against Nottinghamshire in 1882 he batted through the innings and made 5 not out when Lancashire were dismissed for 69. Barlow was also a good bowler with much variation.

According to a (possibly apocryphal) story related by Alan Gibson, Barlow was working as a railway porter when Hornby first encountered him. Hornby happened to see him batting against the bowling of the station-master, and asked if he might have a bowl himself. "Ay, do", was the reply. "He's been in for a fortnight."

== "At Lord's" ==
Barlow is immortalised in one of the best-known pieces of cricket poetry, called "At Lord's" by Francis Thompson. In it Thompson remembers watching Barlow and A. N. Hornby play for Lancashire through rose-tinted glasses. The first verse of the poem, which is repeated as the final verse, is the best known:

It is little I repair to the matches of the Southron folk,
Though my own red roses there may blow;
It is little I repair to the matches of the Southron folk,
Though the red roses crest the caps, I know.
For the field is full of shades as I near a shadowy coast,
And a ghostly batsman plays to the bowling of a ghost,
And I look through my tears on a soundless-clapping host
As the run-stealers flicker to and fro,
To and fro:
Oh my Hornby and my Barlow long ago!

== The Ashes urn ==
Barlow took part in the original Ashes match and is commemorated by the poem pasted on the side of The Ashes urn:

When Ivo goes back with the urn, the urn;
Studds, Steel, Read and Tylecote return, return;
The welkin will ring loud,
The great crowd will feel proud,
Seeing Barlow and Bates with the urn, the urn;
And the rest coming home with the urn.

== Test career ==
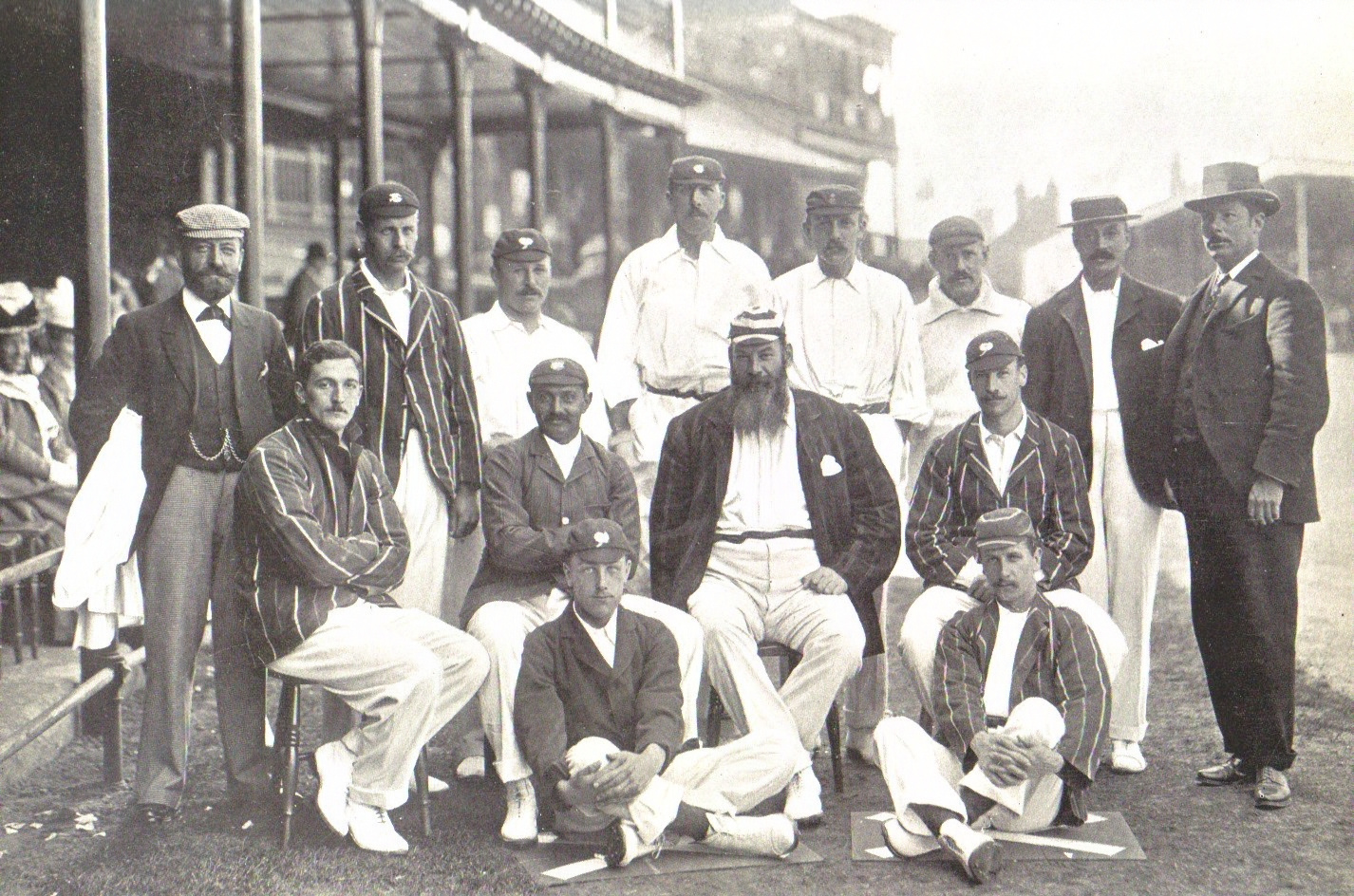
England team with Dick Barlow as umpire, Trent Bridge 1899. Back row: Dick Barlow (umpire), Tom Hayward, George Hirst, Billy Gunn, J T Hearne (12th man), Bill Storer (wkt kpr), Bill Brockwell, V A Titchmarsh (umpire). Middle row: C B Fry, K S Ranjitsinhji, W G Grace (captain), Stanley Jackson. Front row: Wilfred Rhodes, Johnny Tyldesley.

Barlow played seven times for England against Australia in England: in the match which gave rise to the Ashes at the Oval in 1882; and at Lord's, the Oval, and Old Trafford in 1884 and 1886. He made no big score in these matches, but his partnership with Allan Steel was the turning point of the game at Lord's in 1884, and at Manchester, in 1886, his steadiness pulled England through when the Australian bowlers were in deadly form on a slightly crumbled wicket. Moreover, he took seven wickets for 44 runs in Australia's second innings. In 1884 at Trent Bridge, for the North of England against the Australians, Barlow played the game of his life. He scored not out 10 and 101 and took ten wickets—four for six runs and six for 42. It is on record that when the North started their second innings on a slow and nasty wicket, Fred Spofforth, Australia's Demon bowler said, "Give me the ball: they won't get more than 60". As events turned out they got 255, Barlow and Flowers putting on 158 runs together after five wickets had fallen for 53. At the end of that afternoon Barlow was a very happy man. Barlow paid three visits to Australia, going out with Alfred Shaw and Arthur Shrewsbury in 1881–82, with the Hon. Ivo Bligh in 1882–83, and again with Shaw and Shrewsbury in 1886–87. He played in every match of all three tours.

On the first of those tours, after scoring 75 at Sydney against New South Wales, a local wag presented Barlow with a commemorative belt. "I thought we had the champion sticker in Alec Bannerman," said the wag, "but you've fairly won the belt."

== Late life ==
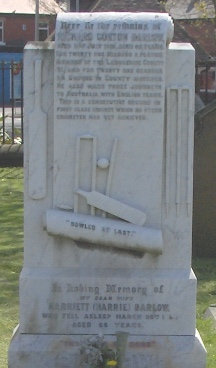
Dick Barlow's grave

Near the end of his life Barlow was quoted in the Manchester Guardian: "I don't think any cricketer has enjoyed his cricketing career better than I have done, and if I had my time to come over again I should certainly be what I have been all my life – a professional cricketer".

Barlow had a wife, Harriet, and a daughter, Eliza. He died 31 July 1919 in Stanley Park, Blackpool, and is buried in Layton Cemetery. On his tombstone is inscribed 'bowled at last'.
