= Herbert Keigwin =

English cricketer and colonial administrator

Herbert Stanley Keigwin MBE ( 4 May 1878 – 11 March 1962) was an English cricketer and colonial administrator in South Africa.

Keigwin was born in Capel, Colchester, Essex, the brother of Henry Keigwin and R. P. Keigwin. He was educated at St Paul's School, London, and Peterhouse, Cambridge. He played first-class matches for Cambridge University (1901); London County (1901); Rhodesia (1909/10). He also played for: CEM Wilson's XI (1898); Essex Second XI (1900–1901) and PR Johnson's XI (1901).

He later joined the colonial civil service. He was Director of Native Development, Southern Rhodesia, when he was made a Member of the Order of the British Empire in the 1924 Birthday Honours "on the termination of the administrative functions of the British South Africa Company in Southern Rhodesia and in Northern Rhodesia."

He died in East London, South Africa in 1962.
