= A. E. J. Collins =

English cricketer and soldier (1885–1914)

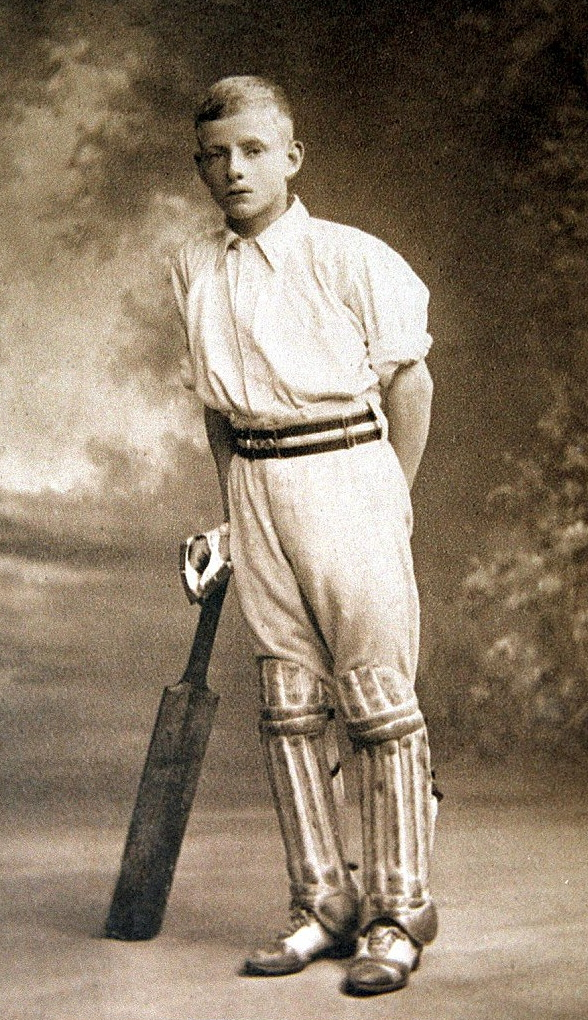
- Collins on an 1899 postcard
- Born: Arthur Edward Jeune Collins; 18 August 1885; Hazaribagh, British India
- Died: 11 November 1914 (aged 29); Ypres, Belgium
- Spouse: Ethel Slater (m. 1914)
- Military career
- Allegiance: British Army
- Service years: 1902–1914
- Rank: Captain
- Nickname: James Collins
- Unit: Royal Engineers
- Conflicts: First World War; First Battle of Ypres
- Awards: Mention in Despatches

Arthur Edward Jeune Collins (18 August 1885 – 11 November 1914) was an English cricketer and soldier. He held, for 116 years, the record of highest score in cricket: as a 13-year-old schoolboy, he scored 628 not out over four afternoons in June 1899. Collins's record-making innings drew a large crowd and increasing media interest; spectators at the Old Cliftonian match being played nearby were drawn away to watch the junior school house cricket match in which Collins was playing. Despite this achievement, Collins never played first-class cricket. Collins's 628 not out stood as the record score until January 2016 when an Indian boy, Pranav Dhanawade, scored 1009 in a single innings.

Collins joined the British Army in 1902 and studied at the Royal Military Academy, Woolwich, before becoming an officer in the Royal Engineers. He served in France during the First World War, where he was killed in action in 1914 during the First Battle of Ypres. Collins had been mentioned in despatches and also represented the Royal Military Academy at cricket and rugby union.

== Early life and education ==
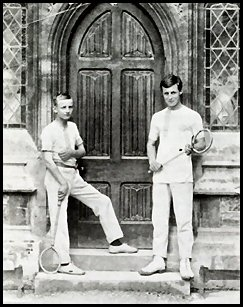
Collins (left) with R. P. Keigwin at Clifton College, as the school racquets team in 1902

Collins was born in Hazaribagh, India, to Arthur Herbert Collins, a judge in the Indian Civil Service, and Mrs Esther Ida Collins. It had been thought that both of his parents had died by the time he began his education at Clifton College, Bristol, where he held a scholarship. However, the 1901 census shows that Arthur's mother was actually still alive.

He joined Clifton College in September 1897, becoming a member of Clark's House, although he later moved to North Town House. Clifton had an excellent reputation for sport. W.G. Grace scored 13 first-class centuries on the Close (Clifton's first XI ground), and he sent his sons to the school. Collins played half-back for the rugby XV, and was also in the cricket XI. He won a bronze medal for boxing at the public schools tournament in Aldershot in 1901.

Tim Rice, in a 9 June 1999 article for The Telegraph to celebrate the centenary of the score, entitled "On the seventh day AEJ Collins rested", described him thus:

He was an orphan whose guardians lived in Tavistock, Devon. He was a reserved boy, short and stockily built, fair-haired and pale. He was remembered by contemporaries as one who led by example, rather than by inspiration, although paradoxically he was regarded as likely to fall short of the highest standards as a cricketer because of his recklessness at the crease.

== The famous match ==
In 1899, as a 13-year-old schoolboy, Collins scored what was then the highest ever recorded cricket score of 628 not out. This feat took place during a junior school house cricket match between Clarke's House and North Town House. Such matches were timeless, played to a finish however long they took. The match was played on an outfield off Guthrie Road, Bristol, now named Collins Piece. The ground had both a poor surface and a very unusual shape: it was very short (only 60 yards (55 m) long), with a wall only 70 yards (60 m) away forming the boundary on one side, while the other side was a gentle slope falling away towards the school sanatorium in the distance. The pitch occupied the central 22 yards (20 m) of the narrow field, with the boundary only 17 yards (16 m) behind each set of stumps. Hits to the long boundary, down the slope, had to be all-run, but the three short boundaries only counted for two runs.

Plaque at Clifton College, fixed in 1962

The match commenced on Thursday, 22 June, to take advantage of two half-day holidays while the college team played their annual match against Old Cliftonians nearby. Collins, a right-handed batsman, won the toss for Clarke's House and chose to bat first. Collins hit his first stroke at around 3.30 pm. By the close of play at 6 pm, he had scored 200 runs, having been dropped on 50, 100 and 140.

School lessons allowed another two-and-a-half hours' play on Friday, 23 June, and by then news of an exceptional innings had gone round the school. So brilliant was his play that even the crowd watching an Old Cliftonian match being played nearby lost its interest and a large crowd watched Collins's phenomenal performance. Collins's innings almost ended at 400 when an easy catch was dropped by the youngest player on the field, 11-year-old Victor Fuller-Eberle, but at around 5.30 pm, after batting for around five hours, rapturous applause broke out when he passed Andrew Stoddart's world-record score of 485. At the end of the second day, he remained unbeaten on 509 and the team on 680 for 8. His innings was reported as a world record in The Times newspaper on Saturday 24 June; the paper, however, gave Collins's score by the close of play on Friday as 501, his age as 14 and mis-reported his name as "A. E. G. Collins".

The match resumed in the lunch hour on Monday, 26 June, at 12:30 pm, with a large crowd. By the end of play, Collins had been dropped again, on 556, to reach 598, but another wicket had fallen, and Collins was running out of partners. On Tuesday, 27 June, the school authorities extended the hours available for play in an attempt to finish the match. The crowds grew and media interest escalated, as The Times again reported on the match on Tuesday, and the disruption to school life was considerable. Collins hit out, with his approach being described as "downright reckless". He was dropped twice more, on 605 and 619. After just 25 minutes' play, Collins lost his final partner, Thomas Redfern, caught by Victor Fuller-Eberle at point for 13, with Collins's score on 628. Collins had played less than seven hours' cricket, carrying his bat through his side's innings. He had scored 1 six, 4 fives, 31 fours, 33 threes, 146 twos and 87 singles. The Times once again ran a report, giving the final figures for Collins's innings in its Wednesday edition of 28 June—once again, however, they misspelled his third initial.

North Town House, demoralised, were bowled out for 87 in 90 minutes on Tuesday. The match resumed on Wednesday 28 June, when North Town's second innings went even worse, making 61 in just over an hour, so Clarke House won by an innings and 688 runs. Collins showed ability as an all-rounder, with his right-arm medium pace bowling taking 11 wickets for 63 runs.

The scorebook hangs in the pavilion at Clifton to this day. The scorers faced a difficult task in accurately recording the innings. One of them, Edward Peglar, is said to have remarked that Collins's score was "628, plus or minus twenty shall we say". The other scorer for the match was J. W. Hall, whose father in 1868 had batted with Edward Tylecote, who later played Test cricket for England and whose name is on a poem kept with the Ashes urn. Tylecote had earlier set a world-record score of 404 not out in 1868, also at Clifton. Hall later wrote that "The bowling probably deserved all the lordly contempt with which Collins treated it, sending a considerable number of pulls full pitch over the fives courts into the swimming baths to the danger of the occupants."

Collins became public property for a long while after the match, forever associated with his great score. "Today all men speak of him", wrote one newspaper, "he has a reputation as great as the most advertised soap: he will be immortalised." After leaving school, he never wanted to be reminded of his famous innings; nevertheless, he has been remembered well beyond his own lifetime.

Within two years, 31-year-old Australian Test cricketer Charles Eady came close to breaking the record, when he made 566 for Break-o'-Day against Wellington in Hobart in less than eight hours spread over three weeks in March 1902. This remained, for over a century, the closest challenge to Collins's record: his score was finally beaten in January 2016 by Pranav Dhanawade, a 15-year-old Indian boy who scored 1,009 not out from 327 balls for KC Gandhi School against Arya Gurukul School in Mumbai. Only five other players, Prithvi Shaw (546), Dadabhoy Havewala (515), JC Sharp (505 not out), Malhotra Chamanlal (502 not out), and Brian Lara (501 not out) have ever scored more than 500 runs in one innings in any form of cricket. Lara is the only person to have achieved a score of over 500 runs in first-class cricket.

== Military career ==
Collins chose to follow an army career, failing his entrance exams to the Royal Military Academy, Woolwich, in September 1901 and representing the Royal Military Academy at both football and rugby as well as cricket, scoring a century in a match against the Royal Military College, Sandhurst. He joined the British Army the following year, being commissioned as a second lieutenant in the Royal Engineers on 21 December 1904. Despite the limitations on his sport that the military service caused, he played several matches for Old Cliftonians, his regiment, and the army, remaining a free-hitting batsman. He played at Lord's in 1913 for Royal Engineers Cricket Club against Royal Artillery Cricket Club, scoring 58 and 36 runs in the two innings, but he never played first-class cricket. He also joined Clifton Rugby Football Club in February 1905, but never rose above the 2nd XV. He served with the 2nd Sappers and Miners in India, and was promoted to lieutenant on 23 June 1907.

Collins married Ethel Slater in the spring of 1914 and was sent to France when the First World War broke out later that year. He was killed in action on 11 November 1914 at the First Battle of Ypres, while serving as a captain with the 5th Field Company, Royal Engineers, at the age of 29. He was signalling for more men to protect the flank of his trench when he was wounded; he was dragged back into the trench by Sapper Farnfield (23900) but he died an hour later. The 5th Field Company carried out the burials of its company on 12 November. Due to the continual fighting over this area for the next four years what remained of his grave and remains were never found, but his name is recorded at the Menin Gate Memorial in Belgium. Before his death, he had been mentioned in despatches. His younger brother Herbert (a lieutenant in the 24th Battalion of the Manchester Regiment and also an old Cliftonian) was killed in action on 11 February 1917, aged 27. Collins's wife, Ethel, lived as a widow for over fifty years, dying on 1 September 1966 in Haslemere.

== See also ==
- List of cricket terms
- History of cricket
