= Allan Ivo Steel =

English cricketer

- Born: 27 September 1892; Toxteth Park, Liverpool
- Died: 8 October 1917 (aged 25); Langemark, Belgium
- Military career
- Allegiance: United Kingdom
- Branch: British Army
- Rank: Lieutenant
- Unit: Coldstream Guards
- Conflicts: World War I

Allan Ivo Steel (27 September 1892 – 8 October 1917) was an English cricketer and soldier.

== Early life ==
Allan Steel was born in Toxteth Park, Liverpool, the son of the Lancashire cricketer A. G. Steel. He attended Eton College, and played in Fowler's match in 1910.

== Cricket ==
As a right-handed batsman and a right-arm slow bowler, he represented Marylebone Cricket Club (MCC) and also Middlesex in two first-class matches in 1912.

== World War I ==
Steel served as a lieutenant of the 2nd Battalion Coldstream Guards regiment of the British Army and was killed on active service during World War I, aged 25. His name is on the Tyne Cot Memorial, Zonnebeke, West-Vlaanderen, Belgium, Panel 9 to 10.

== Personal life ==
Allan's brother, Jack Steel, also died in the war after being washed overboard while on route to take command of HMS Munster.
