= Walter Read =

English cricketer

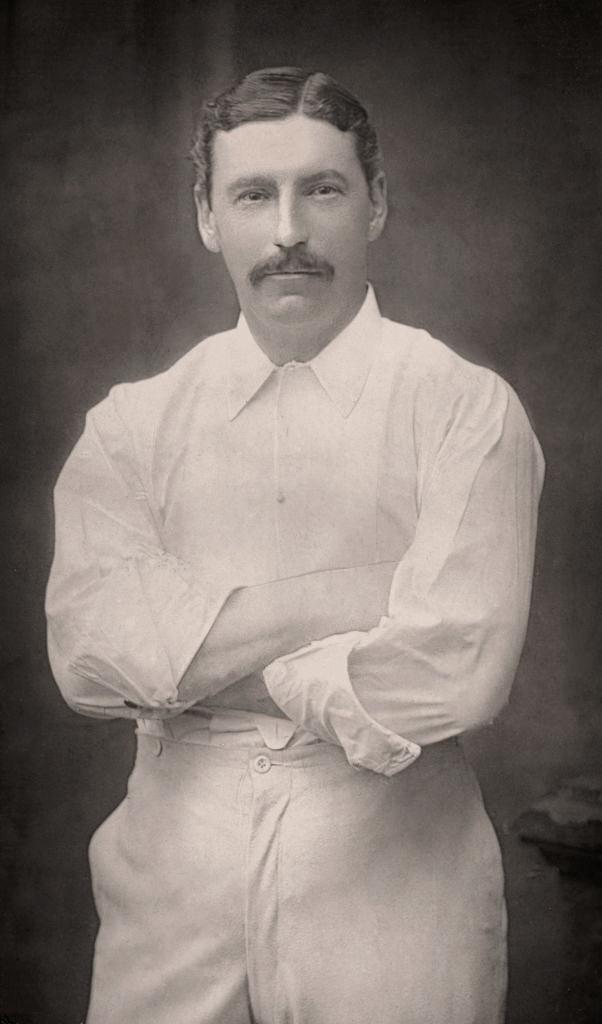

Personal information
- Full name: Walter William Read
- Born: 23 November 1855; Reigate, Surrey, England
- Died: 6 January 1907 (aged 51); Addiscombe Park, Surrey, England
- Batting: Right-handed
- Bowling: Right arm slow (underarm)

International information
- National side: England
- Test debut (cap 40): 30 December 1882 v Australia
- Last Test: 26 August 1893 v Australia

Domestic team information
- Years: Team
- 1873–1897: Surrey
- 1890: MCC

Career statistics
Competition	Test	First-class
Matches	18	467
Runs scored	720	22,349
Batting average	27.69	32.06
100s/50s	1/5	38/113
Top score	117	338
Balls bowled	60	5,597
Wickets	0	108
Bowling average	–	32.25
5 wickets in innings	–	1
10 wickets in match	–	0
Best bowling	–	6/24
Catches/stumpings	16/–	381/20
- Source: CricketArchive, 23 September 2008

Walter William Read (23 November 1855 - 6 January 1907) was an English cricketer. A fluent right hand bat, he was also an occasional bowler of lobs who sometimes switched to quick overarm deliveries. He captained England in two Test matches, winning them both. Read was named a Wisden Cricketer of the Year in 1893.

== Cricket career ==
Read took part in the original Ashes series of 1882–3 and is commemorated by the poem inscribed on the side of the urn:

When Ivo goes back with the urn, the urn;
Studds, Steel, Read and Tylecote return, return;
The welkin will ring loud,
The great crowd will feel proud,
Seeing Barlow and Bates with the urn, the urn;
And the rest coming home with the urn.

He played for Surrey from 1873 to 1897, scoring 338 for them against Oxford University in 1888. At the time, it was the second highest first-class score ever made. He was a member of the side that won the County Championship in 1890–2, 1894 and 1895. After W. G. Grace he was the most prolific amateur of his day.

He became the first number 10 to score a hundred in Test cricket when he made 117 against Australia at The Oval in 1884. His match-saving innings remains the highest score by a No. 10 in Tests. He reached his century in 113 minutes with 36 scoring strokes. His partnership of 151 with William Scotton remains England's highest for the ninth wicket against Australia. According to Sir Home Gordon, Read was furious at being held down so low in the order.

Sporting positions
Preceded by Arthur Shrewsbury	English national cricket captain 1887/8	Succeeded by W. G. Grace
Preceded by W. G. Grace	English national cricket captain 1892	Succeeded by W. G. Grace
