= Pranav Dhanawade =

Indian cricketer (born 2000)

Personal information
- Full name: Pranav Prashant Dhanawade
- Born: 13 May 2000 (age 26); Kalyan, Maharashtra, India
- Batting: Right-handed
- Role: Batsman
- Source: ESPN Cricinfo

Pranav Prashant Dhanawade (born 13 May 2000) is an Indian cricketer from Kalyan, Maharashtra who holds the world record for the most runs scored in one innings. Stretching across two days on 4 and 5 January 2016, he became the first person to score more than 1,000 runs in one innings in an officially recognised match. Dhanawade scored 1,009 not out from 327 balls for K. C. Gandhi High School of the Kalyan administrative district, breaking the 116-year-old record of 628 not out set by English schoolboy A. E. J. Collins in 1899.

On day two of their first innings, with only 5 of 11 players having batted, the K. C. Gandhi High School team declared on 1,465/3, also a world record. The match was one-sided, with the opposition, Arya Gurukul School, only scoring 31 runs in their first innings and 52 in their second.

== Record innings ==
The two-day cricket match between K. C. Gandhi High School and Arya Gurukul School was part of the Bhandari Cup, an under-16 inter-school tournament recognised by the Mumbai Cricket Association. Dhanawade scored 1,009 runs in an innings that lasted 6 hours and 36 minutes, and included 59 sixes and 129 fours at a strike-rate of 308.56. The 15-year-old school student broke a 116-year-old cricketing record, beating the previous highest individual score (including minor cricket) by A. E. J. Collins. Collins had held the record since 1899, when he scored 628 runs for Clarke House against North Town House at Clifton College, England.

Arya Gurukul School scored 31 runs in their first innings, bowled out after facing just 20 overs. In reply, K. C. Gandhi High School made 546 runs before losing their first wicket and by the end of the day were 956 for one, a lead of 925. Dhanawade, who opened the batting, had already broken the previous world record by scoring 652 of those runs. The next day Dhanawade continued batting, reaching 1,000 runs at about 3 o'clock that afternoon. K. C. Gandhi High School declared their innings at 1,465 for three, then dismissed Arya Gurukul School a second time for 52 runs to win the match by an innings and 1,382 runs.

Yogesh Jagtap, the coach of Arya Gurukul School, revealed after the match that they had struggled to enter the competition with their main cricket team because of their exams, and therefore his side consisted mostly of 12-year-old students who were selected to play against 15-year-old students. Jagtap said they had also entered the tournament only so they would not be denied future entry. He estimated there were 21 dropped catches and three missed stumpings during the single K. C. Gandhi High School innings. Jagtap also said that some members of the Arya Gurukul School team had only ever played with a tennis ball before and were scared of the leather ball. Many were under 12 and much of the boundary was only 30 yards (27 m) from the wicket.

Despite the scoreline, Jagtap thought the match was a positive experience for his team and praised Dhanawade's shot selection during his innings. K. C. Gandhi High School's coach was criticised by reporter Shraishth Jain for not retiring any batsmen or declaring the innings earlier. The accomplishment has led to further suggestions of compulsory retirements for batsmen upon reaching a certain score.

== Recognition ==
The Minister of Sport for Maharashtra, Vinod Tawde, subsequently announced that the state government would pay for Dhanawade's future educational and coaching expenses, stating that "Dhanawade's score has made Maharashtra proud. By becoming the world's highest-ever individual scorer in all forms of cricket, he has made the country very proud as well". He was congratulated for his innings by Indian batsman Sachin Tendulkar and former Indian captain Mahendra Singh Dhoni.

== Later career ==
Dhanawade missed out on making the Mumbai under-19 team. He later said that this was because of his inconsistency.

== Personal life ==
Dhanawade is the son of Prashant Dhanawade, who works as an auto rickshaw driver.
