= Frederick Burton (Australian cricketer) =

Australian cricketer (1865–1929)

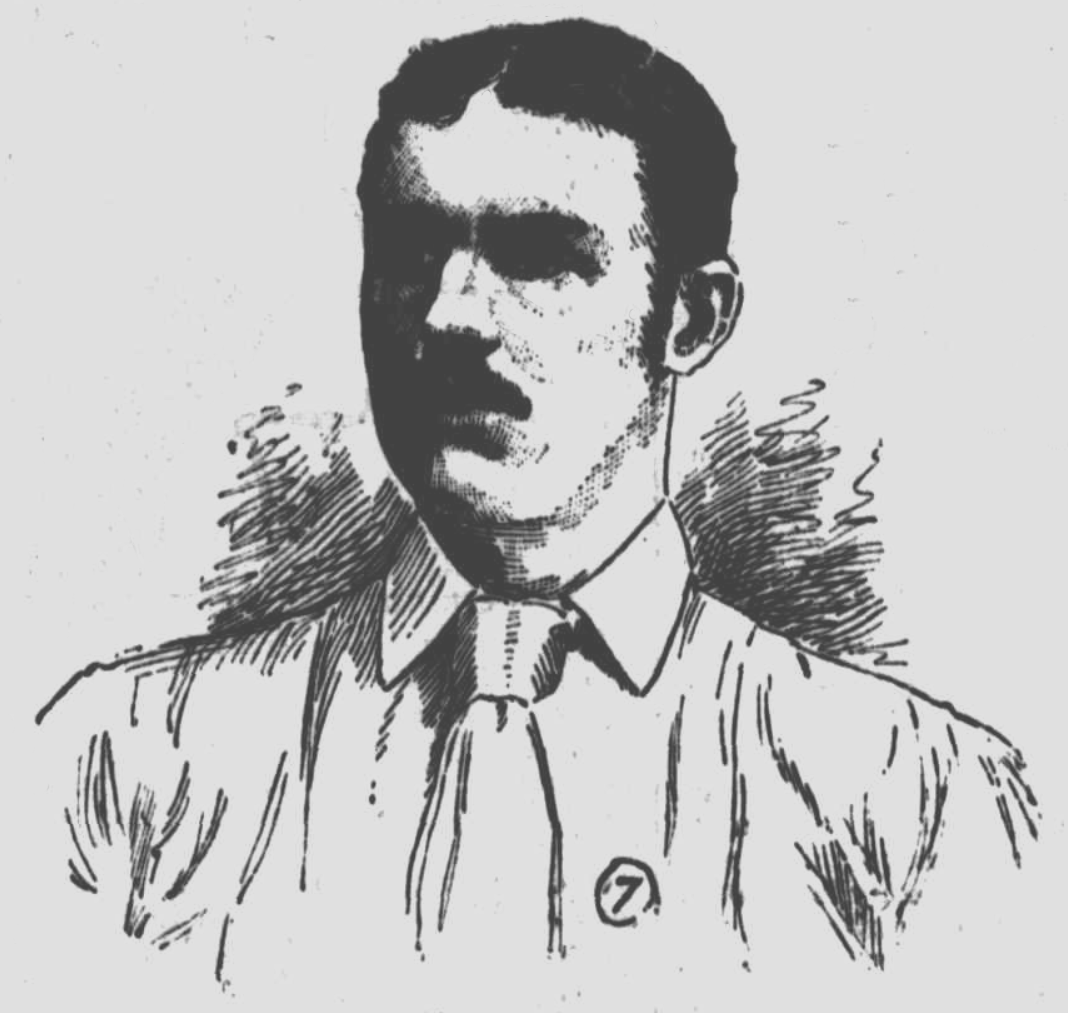

Personal information
- Born: 2 November 1865; Collingwood, Melbourne, Victoria
- Died: 25 August 1929 (aged 63); Wanganui, New Zealand
- Batting: Right-handed
- Role: Wicketkeeper

International information
- National side: Australia
- Test debut (cap 48): 25 February 1887 v England
- Last Test: 10 February 1888 v England

Career statistics
Competition	Test	First-class
Matches	2	22
Runs scored	4	376
Batting average	2.00	13.42
100s/50s	0/0	0/0
Top score	2*	47
Catches/stumpings	1/1	25/7
- Source: Cricinfo, 12 October 2022

Frederick John Burton (2 November 1865 – 25 August 1929) was a wicket-keeper who played first-class cricket for New South Wales, Victoria and in two Test matches in the 1880s for Australia.

He later lived in New Zealand where he was an established cricket umpire.
