= Harry Moses =

Australian cricketer (1858–1938)

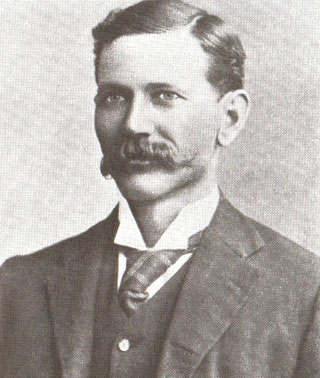

Personal information
- Born: 13 February 1858; Windsor, New South Wales, Australia
- Died: 7 December 1938 (aged 80); Strathfield, Sydney, New South Wales, Australia
- Batting: Left-handed
- Relatives: Henry Moses (father)

International information
- National side: Australia
- Test debut (cap 45): 28 January 1887 v England
- Last Test: 1 February 1895 v England

Domestic team information
- Years: Team
- 1881/82–1894/95: New South Wales

Career statistics
Competition	Tests	First-class
Matches	6	48
Runs scored	198	2898
Batting average	19.80	35.77
100s/50s	0/0	4/15
Top score	33	297*
Balls bowled	0	88
Wickets	–	1
Bowling average	–	52.00
5 wickets in innings	–	0
10 wickets in match	–	0
Best bowling	–	1/19
Catches/stumpings	1/–	25/–
- Source: Cricinfo, 28 March 2022

Henry Moses (13 February 1858 – 7 December 1938) was an Australian cricketer who played in six Test matches, all in Australia against England, between 1887 and 1895. He was later a prominent bowler and businessman in Sydney.

== Life and career ==
Born in Windsor, New South Wales, Moses was one of ten children of Henry Moses, who served in the New South Wales parliament for more than 50 years. He was educated at Calder House School in Redfern, Sydney. He married Alice Friend in the Sydney suburb of Ashfield in February 1882.

In his first two Tests, against England in 1886–87, Moses scored 31, 24, 28 and 33 in low-scoring matches. He played for New South Wales from 1881–82 to 1894–95. In the 1887–88 season he scored 297 not out when New South Wales defeated Victoria by an innings. In December 1892 he captained New South Wales in the first Sheffield Shield match, scoring 99 in the first innings, narrowly missing becoming the first Shield century-maker.

The Referee described his batting thus: "His defence was not to be surpassed; he had unruffled patience, a beautiful off-drive, a clean cover drive and a characteristic fine leg glide." The pressure of his business as a wine merchant prevented him from touring England.

After his cricket career, Moses was a champion bowler, representing New South Wales for 16 years, and captaining the state 60 times.

Moses had wide business interests, and was a director of Tooth and Co. brewers, Goldsbrough Mort & Co., Alliance Assurance Company and other companies. He was a member of the Sydney Cricket Ground Trust from 1907, serving as chairman from 1928 until his death. He died in a Sydney hospital after a long illness in December 1938, aged 80, leaving a widow, two sons and a daughter.
