= John Swift (cricketer) =

Australian cricketer and Test match umpire

John Sheddon Swift (3 February 1852 – 28 February 1926 at Kew, Victoria) was a Victorian first-class cricketer and Test match umpire.

Swift was born in England. He married Ellen Maguire in the Melbourne suburb of Richmond in May 1874. He died suddenly at his home in the Melbourne suburb of Kew in February 1926, aged 74. His wife predeceased him.

He played three matches for Victoria as a right-hand batsman, scoring 65 runs at an average of 13.00 with a highest score of 28. He also kept wicket, taking two catches.

Swift umpired eight Test matches, and was the first Australian to regularly officiate. He made his debut in the match between Australia and England in Melbourne on 31 December 1881 to 4 January 1882, officiating with James Lillywhite. In 1882–83 he and Ted Elliott stood in all four Test matches, the first time two umpires had officiated throughout an entire series. Moyes commented that "apparently we had reached the time when some kind of qualification was required and some consistency in appointment was observed." This was the series that saw presentation of The Ashes urn to the English captain, Ivo Bligh. Swift's last match was between Australia and England in Sydney from 25 February to 1 March 1887.

== Sources ==
- Pollard, Jack, Australian Cricket: 1803–1893, The Formative Years. Sydney, The Book Company, 1995. (ISBN 0-207-15490-2)
- Moyes, A. G., Australian Cricket: A History, Sydney, Angus & Robertson, 1959.
