= Douglas Steel =

English cricketer

Douglas Quintin Steel (19 June 1856 – 2 December 1933) was an English cricketer active from 1876 to 1887 who played for Lancashire and Cambridge University. He was born in West Derby and died in Upton, Cheshire. He appeared in 57 first-class matches as a righthanded batsman and wicketkeeper, also bowling right arm slow pace with a roundarm action. He scored 1,674 runs with a highest score of 158 and held 28 catches with four stumpings. He took seven wickets with a best analysis of five for 65.

Steel came from a notable cricketing family, one of his brothers being A. G. Steel. His highest score of 158 was his sole first-class century, made for Cambridge University against Surrey at The Oval in 1877. Steel was a member of the Cambridge eleven for four years from 1876 to 1879 while he was at Trinity Hall. He had previously been a member of the Uppingham School XI for five seasons, 1871 to 1875, the last two as captain. He was coached there by H. H. Stephenson.

Steel became a solicitor with a practice in Birkenhead, Messrs Layton, Steel and Springman. He advised the executors of James Maybrick.
