= Edward Tylecote =

English cricketer

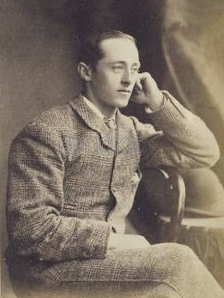
- Tylecote in the 1870s

Personal information
- Born: 23 June 1849; Marston Moretaine, Bedfordshire, England
- Died: 15 March 1938 (aged 88); Hunstanton, Norfolk, England
- Batting: Right-handed
- Relatives: Henry Tylecote (brother)

International information
- National side: England
- Test debut (cap 42): 30 December 1882 v Australia
- Last Test: 14 August 1886 v Australia

Career statistics
Competition	Test	First-class
Matches	6	93
Runs scored	152	3,065
Batting average	19.00	20.70
100s/50s	0/1	3/10
Top score	66	107
Balls bowled	–	24
Wickets	–	0
Bowling average	–	–
5 wickets in innings	–	–
10 wickets in match	–	–
Best bowling	–	–
Catches/stumpings	5/5	127/58
- Source: CricketArchive, 5 June 2020

Edward Ferdinando Sutton Tylecote (23 June 1849 – 15 March 1938) was an English cricketer. He was born in Marston Moretaine, Bedfordshire and was educated at Clifton College and played first-class cricket for Oxford University and Kent County Cricket Club. He also played six Test matches for England. His career lasted from 1869 to 1886.

== Highest innings record ==
When he was 19, Tylecote set the then record for the highest score made in a cricket match when playing in a school match at Clifton College for the Classicals against the Moderns. The Moderns batted first, scoring 100, with Tylecote taking three wickets. He then opened for the Classicals, and although this was a one-innings match, the game was continued until all the Classical players had an innings. Tylecote's innings covered three afternoons and six hours as he amassed 404 not out: the first known quadruple century in a cricket match. The next highest score was 52. Tylecote scored one seven, five fives, 21 fours, 39 threes, 42 twos and 87 ones, all of which were run except for one four hit out of the ground. The record has since been exceeded – by another Clifton College schoolboy AEJ Collins – who scored 628 not out.

Tylecote was a good all-round sportsman at school, winning a number of athletics competitions whilst at Clifton.

== Oxford University, Kent and England ==
Tylecote went on to Oxford University, winning his Blue in 1869, 1870, 1871 and 1872. He was captain in the last two of those years. He went on to play for Kent in 1875, and he continued to play for them to 1883. Tylecote also played some cricket for his home county of Bedfordshire, which is not a first-class county, from 1870 to 1877.

He was a member of the Honourable Ivo Bligh's team to Australia to recover the Ashes in 1882/3. England had lost to Australia at home for the first time in 1882, after which a mock obituary to English cricket had appeared in The Sporting Times. The joke at the time was that Bligh's tour was going over to Australia to recover the ashes. This he succeeded in doing, by beating the team that had beaten England two-one, and afterwards Bligh was presented with an urn with ashes in it by some Melburnian ladies as a memento. A poem was attached to the urn, which memorialises Tylecote's contribution, along with the contributions of a number of his teammates:

When Ivo goes back with the urn, the urn;
Studds, Steel, Read and Tylecote return, return;
The welkin will ring loud,
The great crowd will feel proud,
Seeing Barlow and Bates with the urn, the urn;
And the rest coming home with the urn.

== Career outside cricket ==
Outside of cricket Tylecote taught mathematics at the Royal Military Academy in Woolwich from 1875 to 1895, as well as teaching in some preparatory schools. His hobbies included collecting butterflies, and he left his collection to a museum in Oxford. He died in Hunstanton, Norfolk, in 1938.

== Bibliography ==
- Carlaw, Derek (2020). Kent County Cricketers, A to Z: Part One (1806–1914) (PDF). Cardiff: ACS.
