= International cricket in 1878–79 =

International cricket season

The 1878–79 international cricket season was from September 1878 to March 1879. The match witnessed the first Test match hat-trick, when the Australian pacer Fred Spofforth achieved the first Test match hat-trick when he dismissed The Revd Vernon Royle, Francis MacKinnon and Tom Emmett in the first innings.

== Season overview ==
International tours
Start date	Home team	Away team	Results [Matches]	
Start date	Home team	Away team	Test	FC
2 January 1879	Australia	England	1–0 [1]	—

== January ==
=== England in Australia ===
One-off Test match
No.	Date	Home captain	Away captain	Venue	Result
Test 3	2–4 January	Dave Gregory	Lord Harris	Melbourne Cricket Ground, Melbourne	Australia by 10 wickets
