= English cricket team in Australia and New Zealand in 1878–79 =

International cricket tour

1878-79 Australia v England Series
- Date: 2 January 1879 – 4 January 1879
- Location: Australia
- Result: The one match Test series was won by Australia
Teams
- Australia: England
Captains
- Dave Gregory: Lord Harris
Most runs
- Alick Bannerman (73) Fred Spofforth (39): Lord Harris (69); Charlie Absolom (58)
Most wickets
- Fred Spofforth (13) Frank Allan (4): Tom Emmett (7)

An English cricket team captained by Lord Harris toured Australia and New Zealand in 1878–79 in a private tour organised by the Melbourne Cricket Club. The team's match against Australia in January 1879 was retrospectively given Test match status, making it the third Test ever and the third between Australia and England, though it was not part of The Ashes which began in 1882.

Harris' tour party arrived in Australia just two months after the touring Australians had returned from England. They were scheduled to play five tour matches, two each against New South Wales and Victoria and one against the combined Australians. Whilst in Sydney, the notorious Sydney Riot of 1879 occurred as a result of the tourists match against New South Wales. The English team, which is sometimes referred to as Lord Harris' XI, also visited New Zealand where they played a single match in Christchurch. From there, they travelled home via the Pacific and the US, stopping in Hoboken en route to play one further match there.

== The touring team ==
- Lord Harris (c)
- Charlie Absolom
- Tom Emmett
- Leland Hone
- Alfred Hornby
- Alfred Lucas
- Francis MacKinnon
- Henry Maul
- Frank Penn
- Vernon Royle
- Sandford Schultz
- George Ulyett
- Alexander Webbe

Henry Maul (1850–1940), a batsman, played in eight of the minor matches on the tour, and later had a long career with Warwickshire in their pre-first-class days, but never played first-class cricket. Frank Penn, the only other tourist not to play in the Test, played in the one-off Test against Australia in 1880.

== The Test teams ==
Australia	England
Dave Gregory (c); Frank Allan; Alick Bannerman; Charles Bannerman; Jack Blackham (wk); Harry Boyle; Tom Garrett; Tom Horan; Thomas Kelly; Billy Murdoch; Fred Spofforth	Lord Harris (c); Charlie Absolom; Tom Emmett; Leland Hone (wk); A. N. Hornby; A. P. Lucas; Francis MacKinnon; Vernon Royle; Sandford Schultz; George Ulyett; A. J. Webbe

== Matches ==
=== Only Test ===
2–4 January 1879
(Timeless Test)
Scorecard

England	v	Australia
113 (54 overs); Charlie Absolom 52; Fred Spofforth 6/48 (25 overs)		256 (159.3 overs); Alick Bannerman 73; Tom Emmett 7/68 (59 overs)
160 (68 overs); Lord Harris 36; Fred Spofforth 7/62 (35 overs)		0/19 (2.3 overs); Charles Bannerman 15*

Australia won by 10 wickets
Melbourne Cricket Ground, Melbourne
Umpires: P. Coady (Aus) and George Coulthard (Aus)

- England won the toss and elected to bat.
- Frank Allan (Aus), Alick Bannerman (Aus), Harry Boyle (Aus), Charlie Absolom (Eng), Lord Harris (Eng), Leland Hone (Eng), A. N. Hornby (Eng), A. P. Lucas (Eng), Francis MacKinnon (Eng), Vernon Royle (Eng), Sandford Schultz (Eng) and A. J. Webbe (Eng) made their Test debut.
- Fred Spofforth (Aus) became the first player to ever take a hat-trick in Test cricket.

== Records ==
=== Individual records ===
Most runs	Alick Bannerman	73
Most wickets	Fred Spofforth	13
Most catches (excluding wicket-keepers)	A. J. Webbe / Vernon Royle / Tom Horan	2
Highest individual innings	Alick Bannerman	73
Best innings bowling	Fred Spofforth	7/62
Highest match total	Alick Bannerman	73
Best match bowling	Fred Spofforth	13

=== Team records ===
Best innings	Australia	256 (first innings)
Worst innings	England	113 (first innings)
Tosses won	Australia	1 (of 1)
