= Sandford Schultz =

English cricketer

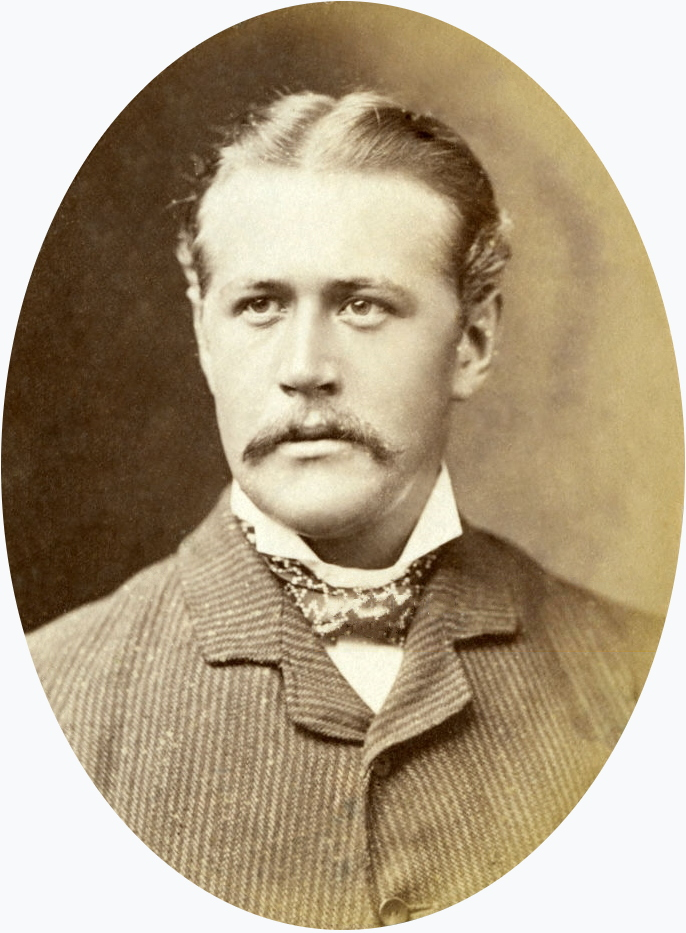
- Schultz in about 1878

Personal information
- Born: 29 August 1857; Birkenhead, Cheshire, England
- Died: 18 December 1937 (aged 80); Brompton, Kensington, England
- Batting: Right-handed
- Bowling: Right-arm fast

International information
- National side: England
- Only Test (cap 19): 2 January 1879 v Australia

Career statistics
Competition	Test	First-class
Matches	1	42
Runs scored	20	1,046
Batting average	20.00	17.14
100s/50s	0/0	0/5
Top score	20	90
Balls bowled	34	2,236
Wickets	1	28
Bowling average	26.00	40.82
5 wickets in innings	0	0
10 wickets in match	0	0
Best bowling	1/16	4/37
Catches/stumpings	0/–	29/–
- Source: Cricinfo, 10 May 2023

Sandford Spence Schultz (29 August 1857 – 18 December 1937), known in later life as Sandford Spence Storey, was an English cricketer, who played for Uppingham Rovers, Cambridge University, and Lancashire and played in the third-ever Test match. He was also prominent in the golfing world.

== Early life and cricketing career ==
Schultz was born in Birkenhead, Cheshire, the youngest son of George Edward Schultz and his wife Emma née Storey. He was educated at Uppingham and Jesus College, Cambridge.

Although only an occasional player in first-class cricket, Schultz was prolific in club cricket, notching up 232 innings for the Uppingham Rovers (a club record). He was a fast round-arm bowler and all-rounder for the club, taking 257 wickets and scoring more than 5,000 runs (with a top score of 286 against the United Services in 1887). He was also a “smart slip fieldsman”.

Schultz was selected as an amateur in Lord Harris's side that toured Australia in 1878-79, and played in the one Test match of that tour (subsequently counted as the third-ever Test match). England lost, but his score of 20 when batting at number 11 in the second innings prevented an innings defeat. He also played in the subsequent match against New South Wales that became notorious for the Sydney Riot of 1879, the first recorded occasion when a cricket match led to a riot. The resulting ill-feeling ruled out any further Test matches on the tour.

Schultz's Wisden obituary in 1938 recalled a less happy batting experience related in a letter to The Times by a Mr Edmund Peake about a match between the Gentlemen of England and Oxford University Cricket Club on the Christ Church College ground at Oxford in 1881:

The fast bowler (I blush to say it) committed such havoc as would have made him famous in these days. The Gentlemen refused to continue and the match was begun all over again in The Parks. One batsman – SS Schultz – was out first ball each time. Twice first ball in one innings – a record.

He played occasionally for Lancashire, despite the protest of Lord Harris (the Kent captain and Schultz's former Test captain), who pointed out without success that Schultz had been born in Cheshire:

[I] noticed that Lancashire had advertised to play against Kent SS Schultz, an old friend and member of my team in Australia in 1878-9, but having, I was satisfied, no qualification. On arrival at the ground, my great friend Albert Hornby and EB Rowley came up, and in the most innocent way expressed their astonishment at my protest and said that Schultz had always played for Lancashire. I admitted that, but pointed out that he had not been born in Lancashire and was not living there. ‘Oh yes,’ they replied, ‘but his family home is in the county.’ ‘Are you sure?’ I replied, ‘for I understand his mother lives in Birkenhead, and that is in Cheshire.’ ‘Yes,” they rejoined triumphantly, ‘and Port of Liverpool.’ The audacity of this claim was so astonishing that I never said another word.

On at least one occasion Schultz played on the same team as W. G. Grace (for the Orleans Club against an Australian team).

He was the only English Test cricketer with a 'z' in his surname until Usman Afzaal played three Tests in 2001.

== Golfing career ==
Schultz was a member of Royal St George's Golf Club at Sandwich, Kent and Brighton & Hove Golf Club in Sussex. He distinguishing himself in competitions at both clubs and at other neighbouring clubs, and came second in the Sussex County Amateur Championship in 1903. He managed to combine his two favourite sports by playing cricket for Royal St George's Golf Club against the Royal Military Club at Dover on at least three occasions.

Representing Royal St George's, Schultz was one of eight men who met in Edinburgh in 1902 as organisers of what went on to become the annual England–Scotland Amateur Match. (Two attended from each of Royal St George's, the Royal Liverpool Golf Club, The Royal and Ancient Golf Club of St Andrews, and the Honorable Company of Edinburgh Golfers. Schultz's brother Arthur was a member of the Royal and Ancient at the time, but was not a representative at the meeting.)

== Personal life ==
Schultz married Mabel Durrant in 1885. They had three daughters, only the eldest of whom (known as Fairy) survived beyond early childhood. They lived in Kensington and then Chelsea, London; but they also spent a great deal of time in both Sandwich and Hove, where Schultz was a prominent golfer and where Mabel participated in the counties' social life.

Schultz followed in the footsteps of his father and two of his brothers by taking up stockbroking, setting up in partnership as Messrs Hedderwick and Schultz and trading on the London Stock Exchange. In December 1914, after the start of World War I, he changed his Germanic-sounding surname to Storey, which was his mother's maiden name. (His daughter Fairy thereby became Fairy Storey!) He died in Brompton, Kensington, aged 80.
