= George Harris, 3rd Baron Harris =

British peer, Liberal politician and colonial administrator (1810–1872)

The Right Honourable The Lord Harris GCSI
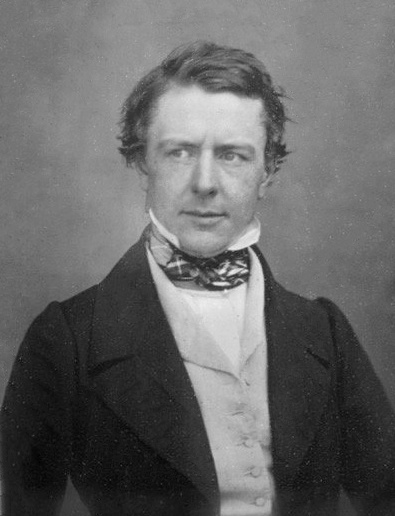
- George Harris in the 1840s

Governor of Madras Presidency
- In office 28 April 1854 – 28 March 1859
- Preceded by: Daniel Eliott (acting)
- Succeeded by: Sir Charles Edward Trevelyan

Governor of Trinidad

Personal details
- Born: 14 August 1810 Belmont, Kent, United Kingdom
- Died: 23 November 1872 (aged 62) United Kingdom
- Spouse: Sarah Cummins
- Military Service
- Allegiance: Great Britain
- Branch: British Militia
- Service years: 1864 - 1872
- Rank: Honorary Colonel
- Unit: East Kent Militia

George Francis Robert Harris, 3rd Baron Harris GCSI (14 August 1810 – 23 November 1872), was a British peer, Liberal politician and colonial administrator. He served as the Governor of Trinidad from 1846 to 1854 and Governor of Madras from 1854 to 1859.

== Early life and education ==
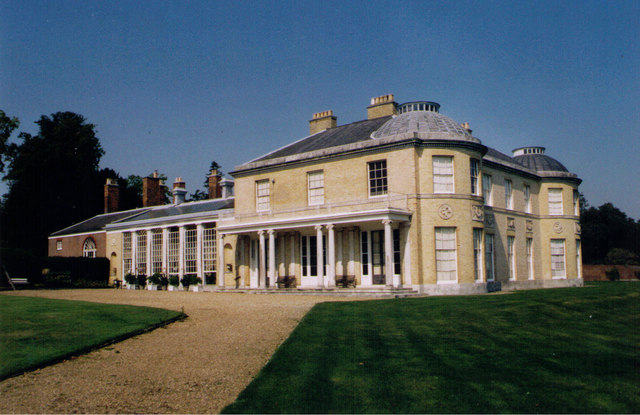
Belmont House, Kent - the Harris family seat

Harris was born on 14 August 1810 to William Harris, 2nd Baron Harris and his wife Eliza Selina Anne who owned Waterstown House at Glasson, Co. Westmeath, Ireland, and Belmont House, Faversham, England. He was the grandson of George Harris, 1st Baron Harris, who had commanded the army of the British East India Company in the Fourth Mysore War. Harris had his early education at Eton College and under the private tutorship of Rev. John Shaw before joining Merton College, Oxford in 1829. Harris completed his matriculation from Merton College and graduated in arts from Christ Church, Oxford in 1832.

He succeeded his father in June 1845 to the barony and the family seat of Belmont House. He also became joint patron of Athlone Yacht Club in 1845 with Lord Castlemaine and Hon. L. H. King-Harman following the death of his father.

Harris was beset will ill-health and remained bed-ridden for some time in the city of Pau in France where he worked for a time for the Church of England.

== Governor of Trinidad ==
In 1846, Harris was appointed Governor of Trinidad, a role he kept until 1854. In 1850 he married Sarah, daughter of Port of Spain archdeacon George Cummins. During his tenure, Harris revamped the prevailing education system thereby laying down the foundation for the present-day system of education in Trinidad. Harris also mooted the idea of importing indentured labourers from India to replace the plantation slaves who had been freed following the abolition of slavery. Harris is considered to be one of Trinidad's best administrators though he has also been criticized for favouring his own men in appointments.

== Governor of Madras ==
Soon after taking over as Governor of Madras, Harris found grave deficiencies in the police system in the Presidency and reorganised the force introducing reforms that would eventually give rise to the Indian police as it exists today. On 1 July 1856, Harris flagged off the first regular passenger train service in the province between the city of Madras and the town of Arcot. The University of Madras was established in 1857 when Harris was the governor. In September 1854, Harris headed the Torture Commission appointed to investigate the allegations of torture inflicted on Indian peasants by revenue officials.

Throughout his tenure, Harris was critical of the attitude of the Anglo-Indian press in Madras and tried to regulate the freedom of the press. He criticized them as:

disloyal in tone, un-English in spirit, and wanting in every principle

When the Indian Rebellion of 1857 broke out, the province of Madras remained loyal to the British Crown. As a result, Harris lent the whole Madras Army to the Government of India for quelling the rebellion. The Madras Army participated in the relief of Cawnpore in which Lieutenant-Colonel James George Smith Neill of the Madras Fusiliers indulged in indiscriminate massacre of Indians and was eventually killed. However, there is also evidence that suggests that one of the 52 regiments of the Madras Army refused to volunteer for service during the mutiny.

Harris continued even after the transfer of sovereignty over India from the British East India Company to the British crown in 1858, eventually resigning as governor in 1859.

== Later life and death ==
Lord Harris died in November 1872, aged 62. In 1850 he had married Sarah, daughter of the Venerable George Cummins, Archdeacon of Trinidad. She died only three years later.

In 1864 he was appointed Honorary Colonel of the East Kent Militia. He presided in 1870 over the East and West Kent Club and was until his death president of the Kent County Cricket Club.

Lord Harris was succeeded in the barony by his son Robert Harris, 4th Baron Harris, who became a successful cricketer and Conservative politician.

== Arms ==
Coat of arms of George Harris, 3rd Baron Harris

Crest
On a mural crown Or a royal tiger passant-guardant Vert striped Or spotted of the first pierced in the breast with an arrow of the last vulned Gules charged on the forehead with a Persian character for Ryder and crowned with an Eastern coronet both of the first.
Escutcheon
Vert on a chevron embattled, erminois between three hedgehogs Or, as many bombs Sable fired Proper a chief of augmentation thereon the gates and fortress of Seringapatam the draw-bridge let down and the Union flag of Great Britain and Ireland hoisted over the standard of Tippoo Sahib all Proper.
Supporters
Dexter a Grenadier soldier of the 73rd Regiment in his regimentals Proper supporting with his exterior hand a staff thereon hoisted the union flag of Great Britain and Ireland over that of the standard of Tippoo Sahib and beneath the tri-coloured flag entwined, inscribed with the word " Republique "; sinister a Malay soldier in his uniform Proper supporting a like staff thereon hoisted the flag of the East India Company Argent striped barwise Gules with a canton, over the standard of Tippoo Sahib with the tri-coloured flag entwined beneath as on the dexter inscribed with the word "Franeaise" all Proper.
Motto
My Prince and My Country.

Political offices
Preceded by The Lord Byron	Lord-in-waiting; 1860–1863	Succeeded by The Lord Talbot of Malahide
Government offices
Preceded by Henry George Macleod	Governor of Trinidad; 1846–1854	Succeeded by L. Bourchier (acting)
Preceded by Daniel Eliott (acting)	Governor of Madras; 1854–1859	Succeeded by Sir Charles Trevelyan
Peerage of the United Kingdom
Preceded by William Harris	Baron Harris; 1845–1872	Succeeded by Robert George Canning Harris
