= International cricket in 1884 =

International cricket season

The 1884 international cricket season was from April 1884 to September 1884. The season consisted of a single international tour, with Australia visiting England for The Ashes series.

== Season overview ==
International tours
Start date	Home team	Away team	Results [Matches]	
Start date	Home team	Away team	Test	FC
10 July 1884	England	Australia	1–0 [3]	—

== July ==
=== Australia in England ===
The Ashes Test match series
No.	Date	Home captain	Away captain	Venue	Result
Test 14	10–12 July	Monkey Hornby	Billy Murdoch	Old Trafford Cricket Ground, Manchester	Match drawn
Test 15	21–23 July	Lord Harris	Billy Murdoch	Lord's, London	England by an innings and 5 runs
Test 16	11–13 August	Lord Harris	Billy Murdoch	Kennington Oval, London	Match drawn
