= Charlie Absolom =

English cricketer (1846–1889)

Personal information
- Full name: Charles Alfred Absolom
- Born: 7 June 1846; Blackheath, Kent
- Died: 30 July 1889 (aged 43); Port-of-Spain, Trinidad
- Nickname: Cambridge Navvy
- Batting: Right-handed
- Bowling: Right-arm medium

International information
- National side: England
- Only Test (cap 12): 2 January 1879 v Australia

Domestic team information
- Years: Team
- 1866–1869: Cambridge University
- 1868–1879: Kent

Career statistics
Competition	Test	First-class
Matches	1	99
Runs scored	58	2,515
Batting average	29.00	15.05
100s/50s	0/1	0/4
Top score	52	94
Balls bowled	0	13,036
Wickets	–	282
Bowling average	–	19.47
5 wickets in innings	–	19
10 wickets in match	–	3
Best bowling	–	7/45
Catches/stumpings	0/–	127/–
- Source: CricInfo, 19 March 2017

Charles Alfred Absolom (7 June 1846 – 30 July 1889) was an English amateur cricketer who played for Cambridge University, Kent County Cricket Club and England in the period from 1866 to 1879.

== Early life ==
Absolom was born at Blackheath, Kent, the son of Edward Absolom, a tea merchant, and his wife Elizabeth. The family later moved to Snaresbrook in Essex and Absolom was educated at a school in Calne in Wiltshire and at Trinity College, Cambridge. He won Blues in cricket and athletics at Cambridge before graduating in 1870. He was known to friends as "Bos" and nicknamed "The Cambridge Navvy", possibly in reference to his size and strength. In 18 matches for the university he took over 100 wickets and played in the Varsity Match in each year between 1866 and 1869. He played in several games for the Gentlemen against the Players and in 1868 started playing for Kent. After Cambridge he enrolled at Inner Temple but did not complete his law studies.

== Cricket career ==
Absolom toured Australia with Lord Harris's team in 1878/79 and played in the only Test match of the tour. He was selected by Harris, his county captain, for the tour, although at 32 both his batting and his bowling ability were declining. After Australia's Fred Spofforth had taken a hat-trick and helped reduce England to 26 for 7, Absolom came in and made 52 runs from ninth in the batting order, adding 63 runs with Harris for the eighth wicket.

He did not play another Test match and had completed his career with Kent by the end of the 1879 season. He had played in 57 matches for the county and taken 87 wickets. In 1868, whilst playing for Cambridge, Absolom became the first batsman in first-class cricket to be given out obstructing the field when a ball being returned to the wicket came into contact with his bat whilst he was attempting to complete a seventh run.

== Later life ==
After leaving the legal profession, it is unclear how Absolom made his living through much of the 1870s. He was a regular guest at the Canonbury home of the young M.V. Hughes, who recalled playing cricket with him and that he 'was so constantly staying with us that I looked on him as a kind of uncle.' He left England in late 1879, travelling to the United States, initially at Charlottesville and then in the New York area as well as spending time living with the Spokane people along the Columbia River in Washington Territory. He worked as a ship's purser on the SS Orinoco and the SS Muriel and played cricket for Staten Island Cricket Club. He died in 1889 aged 43 in an accident whilst cargo was being loaded onto Muriel at Port of Spain in Trinidad.

== Bibliography ==
- Carlaw, Derek (2020). Kent County Cricketers, A to Z: Part One (1806–1914) (PDF). Cardiff: ACS.
