= 1867 Birthday Honours =

Appointments by Queen Victoria

The 1867 Birthday Honours were appointments by Queen Victoria to various orders and honours to reward and highlight good works by citizens of the British Empire. The appointments were made to celebrate the official birthday of the Queen, and were published in The London Gazette on 24 May 1867.

The recipients of honours are displayed here as they were styled before their new honour, and arranged by honour, with classes (Knight, Knight Grand Cross, etc.) and then divisions (Military, Civil, etc.) as appropriate.

== United Kingdom and British Empire ==
=== The Most Exalted Order of the Star of India ===
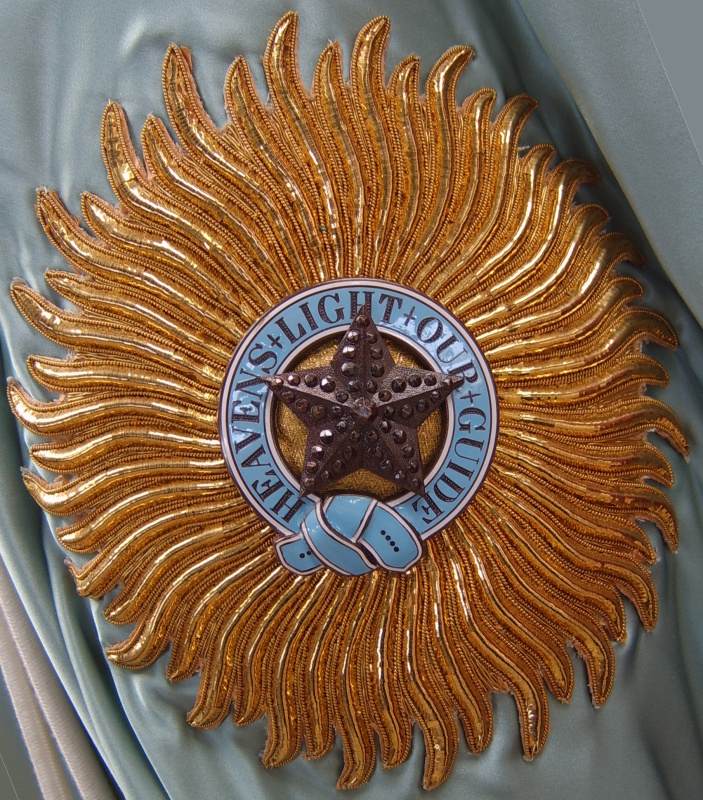
Star of a Knight Grand Commander of the Most Exalted Order of the Star of India

==== Knight Grand Commander (GCSI) ====
- His Highness Krishnah Raj Wadyar, Maharajah of Mysore

==== Knight Commander (KCSI) ====
- His Highness the Maharajah Sree Jowan Singjee, Chief of Edur
- Daniel Eliott, Madras Civil Service (Retired), late Member of the Law Commission, of the Legislative Council of India, and of the Council of the Governor of Madras
- George Frederick Harvey, Bengal Civil Service (Retired), late Commissioner of Agra
- Major-General William Hill, late Madras Army, Commanding the Nizam's Contingent during the mutinies of 1857–1858
- Major-General Vincent Eyre CB Royal (late Bengal) Artillery
- The Rajah Jodhbir Chund of Nadown
- Henry Lacon Anderson, Bombay Civil Service (Retired), late Chief Secretary to the Government of Bombay, and Member of the Council of the Governor-General of India for making Laws and Regulations
- Richard Temple CSI Bengal Civil Service, Resident at Hyderabad
- Colonel Arthur Purves Phayre CB Bengal Staff Corps, Chief Commissioner in British Burmah
