= Michael Harris, 9th Baron Harris =

Royal Navy officer

Rear Admiral The Right Honourable The Lord Harris JP
- Born: 5 July 1941 (age 85)
- Military career
- Allegiance: United Kingdom
- Branch: Royal Navy
- Service years: 1960–1992
- Rank: Rear Admiral
- Commands: HMS Ark Royal (1987–1989); HMS Cardiff (1980–1982); HMS Sovereign (1975–1977); HMS Osiris (1970–1972)
- Conflicts: Falklands War

Rear Admiral Michael George Temple Harris, 9th Baron Harris (born 5 July 1941), is a British peer and former Royal Navy officer who was the captain of HMS Cardiff during the Falklands War. He was promoted lieutenant on 1 May 1963, and lieutenant commander on 1 May 1971, and retired on 3 April 1992.

He has lived with his wife, Katrina, in a Grade-II-listed house in Whitchurch, Hampshire, since 1992.

Harris became the 9th Baron Harris upon the death of his fourth cousin, Anthony Harris, 8th Baron Harris, in March 2023. The heir presumptive to the barony is his brother, John Harris (born 1944).

Peerage of the United Kingdom
| Preceded by Anthony Harris | Baron Harris; 2023–present | Incumbent; Heir presumptive: John Harris |
