= Edwin Tindall =

New South Wales cricketer

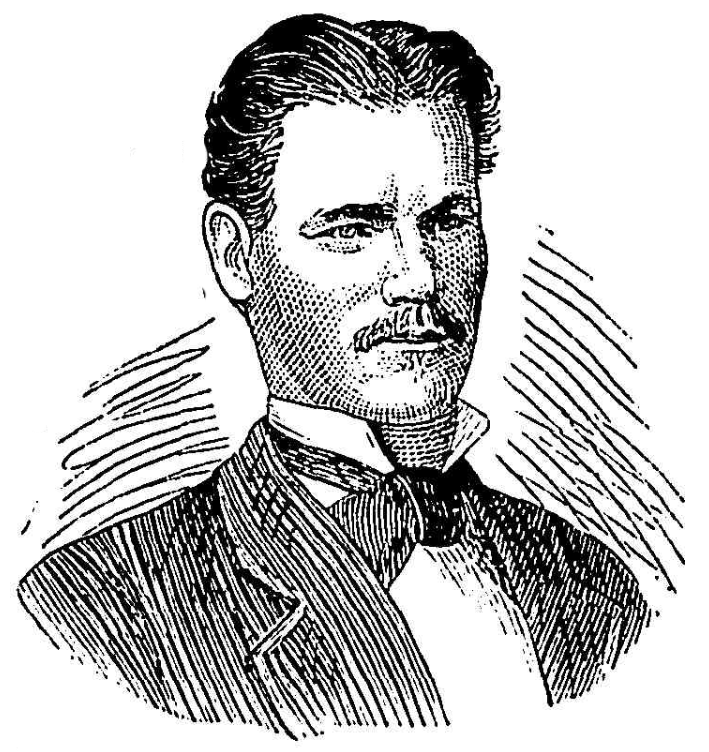

Personal information
- Born: Liverpool, New South Wales
- Batting: Right-handed

Edwin Tindall (1851-1926) played first-class cricket for New South Wales between 1874/75 and 1880/81. He was a right-arm medium pace bowler.

His career best bowling was 6/31 in a match against Victoria in February 1878. In a match for NSW against a visiting English team led by Lord Harris in 1879, Tindall bowled 27 overs without success.

Tindall was born at Liverpool, New South Wales on 31 March 1851 and died on 16 January 1926 at Marrickville.
