= Reginald Allen (Australian cricketer) =

Australian cricketer (1858–1952)

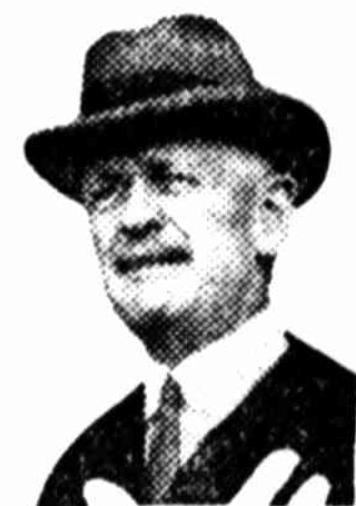
- Allen in 1930

Personal information
- Full name: Reginald Charles Allen
- Born: 2 July 1858; Glebe, New South Wales, Australia
- Died: 2 May 1952 (aged 93); Sydney, New South Wales, Australia
- Batting: Right-handed
- Bowling: Right-arm fast-medium
- Relatives: George Wigram Allen (father); Gubby Allen (nephew)

International information
- National side: Australia
- Only Test (cap 47): 25 February 1887 v England

Domestic team information
- Years: Team
- 1878/79–1887/88: New South Wales

Career statistics
Competition	Test	First-class
Matches	1	17
Runs scored	44	382
Batting average	22.00	12.32
100s/50s	0/0	0/0
Top score	30	41
Balls bowled	–	220
Wickets	–	2
Bowling average	–	58.50
5 wickets in innings	–	0
10 wickets in match	–	0
Best bowling	–	1/4
Catches/stumpings	2/–	9/–
- Source: ESPNcricinfo, 26 December 2022

Reginald Charles Allen (2 July 1858 in Glebe, New South Wales – 2 May 1952 in Sydney) was an Australian cricketer who played in one Test match against England in 1887.

Allen played for New South Wales and was top scorer in the first innings of the state match against the England team – under the name "A. Shaw's XI" – that immediately preceded the second Test.

He batted at number three in his only Test, scored 14 and 30, and took two catches. In his second innings, he was caught by one of his own side, Charlie Turner, who was fielding as a substitute for England. His obituary in Wisden in 1953 says that he turned down the opportunity to tour England in 1888 under the captaincy of Percy McDonnell.

Allen, who attended Sydney Grammar School, was a successful scholar. He attained the highest mark in the New South Wales Public Examinations in his final year at school, and was later awarded the University Medal at the University of Sydney. Although he was not athletic in build, he was also a successful all-round sportsman, representing Sydney University's First Grade Rugby Union team, and playing in the New South Wales Open Tennis Championship (which was then entirely amateur). He became an enthusiastic and moderately successful breeder and owner of racehorses.

His father was George Wigram Allen, a lawyer and politician. After graduating from university, Allen joined his father's law firm (now known as Allens), of which he remained a partner for several decades. He was the uncle of the England Test captain Gubby Allen, who was born in Australia. Reginald Allen married Edith Muriel Grubb in Franklin, Tasmania, in April 1906. He died in 1952 and his funeral proceeded from St Stephen's Church in Macquarie Street to the Northern Suburbs Crematorium.

Preceded by Francis MacKinnon	Oldest living Test cricketer 27 February 1947 – 2 May 1952	Succeeded by Kenny Burn
