= Baron Harris =

Barony in the Peerage of the United Kingdom

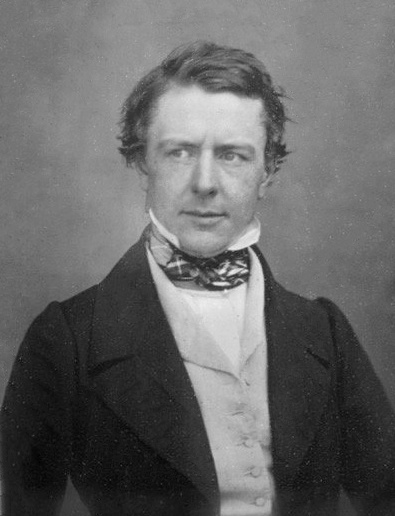
George Harris, 3rd Baron Harris.

Baron Harris, of Seringapatam and Mysore in the East Indies and of Belmont in the County of Kent, is a title in the Peerage of the United Kingdom.

The title was created in 1815 for the military commander General Sir George Harris. He gained fame as Commander-in-Chief at the siege and capture of Seringapatam and the conquest of Mysore in India in 1799. He was also injured at the Battle of Bunker Hill in the American Revolutionary War. He was succeeded by his eldest son, the second Baron. He was a Lieutenant-General in the Army. His son, the third Baron, served as Governor of Madras and also held minor office in the second Liberal administration of Lord Palmerston. His son, the fourth Baron, was a Conservative politician and served as Under-Secretary of State for India, Under-Secretary of State for War and Governor of Bombay. Lord Harris was also a successful cricketer.

On the death of his grandson, the sixth Baron, in 1995, the line of the eldest son of the first Baron failed. The late Baron was succeeded by his fourth cousin, the seventh Baron. He was the great-great-grandson of the Hon. Michael Thomas Harris, second son of the first Baron.

He was succeeded by his son, the eighth Baron, who left no male issue. As of 2023 the title is held by the latter's fourth cousin, Rear Admiral Michael Harris, the ninth Baron, a former Royal Navy officer who was the captain of HMS Cardiff during the Falklands War.

The family seat is Belmont House near Faversham in Kent.

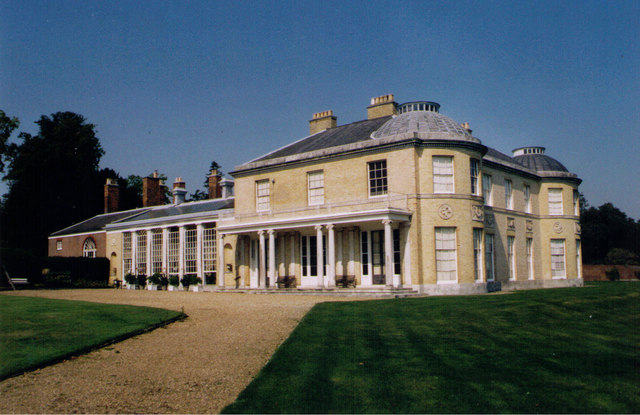
Belmont House, Kent

== Barons Harris (1815) ==
- George Harris, 1st Baron Harris (1746–1829)
- William George Harris, 2nd Baron Harris (1782–1845)
- George Francis Robert Harris, 3rd Baron Harris (1810–1872)
- George Robert Canning Harris, 4th Baron Harris (1851–1932)
- George St Vincent Harris, 5th Baron Harris (1889–1984)
- George Robert John Harris, 6th Baron Harris (1920–1995)
- Derek Marshall Harris, 7th Baron Harris (1916–1996)
- Anthony Thomas Scott Harris, 8th Baron Harris (1942–2023)
- Michael George Temple Harris, 9th Baron Harris (born 1941)

The heir presumptive is the present holder's brother, John Frank Temple Harris (born 1944).

=== Title succession chart ===
Title succession chart, Barons Harris.

George Harris; 1st Baron Harris; 1746–1829
William Harris; 2nd Baron Harris; 1782–1845	Hon. Michael Harris; 1783–1824
George Harris; 3rd Baron Harris; 1810–1872	Rev. Hon. William Harris; 1814–1840	Hon. Reginald Harris Temple; 1830–1900	Hon. Arthur Harris-Temple; 1835–1906	Thomas Harris; 1811–1867	George Harris; 1812–1891
George Harris; 4th Baron Harris; 1851–1932	Arthur Harris-Temple; 1874–1928	Lt. Col. Thomas Harris; 1845–1918	Lt. Col. Charles Harris; 1856–1905	Edmund Harris; 1861–?	George Harris; 1836–1903
George Harris; 5th Baron Harris; 1889–1984	Arthur Harris-Temple; 1904–1981	Major; Thomas Harris; 1882–1955	George Harris; 1883–?	George Harris; 1876–1929
George Harris; 6th Baron Harris; 1920–1995	Derek Harris; 7th Baron Harris; 1916–1996	Ronald Harris-Temple; 1911–1994	Antony Harris; 1915–2002
Anthony Harris; 8th Baron Harris; 1942–2023	Michael Harris; 9th Baron Harris born 1941	John Harris born 1944

=== Line of succession ===
- George Harris, 1st Baron Harris (1746–1829)
  - William George Harris, 2nd Baron Harris (1782–1845)
    - George Francis Robert Harris, 3rd Baron Harris (1810–1872)
      - George Robert Canning Harris, 4th Baron Harris (1851–1932)
        - George St Vincent Harris, 5th Baron Harris (1889–1984)
          - George Robert John Harris, 6th Baron Harris (1920–1995)
  - Hon. Michael Thomas Harris (1783–1824)
    - Thomas Inglis Parish Harris (1811–1867)
      - Lt. Col. Thomas Harris (1845–1918)
        - Major Thomas Guy Marriott Harris (1882–1955)
          - Derek Marshall Harris Harris, 7th Baron Harris (1916–1996)
            - Anthony Thomas Scott Harris, 8th Baron Harris (1942–2023)
    - George Anstruther Harris (1812–1891)
      - George Lucian Taylor Harris (1836–1903)
        - George Temple James Harris (1876–1929)
          - Antony John Temple Harris (1915–2002)
            - Michael George Temple Harris, 9th Baron Harris (born 1941)
            - (1) John Frank Temple Harris (born 1944)
      - Hermann Gundert Harris (1859–1950)
        - George Rutherford Harris (1903–1983)
          - Gerald Rutherford Harris (1928–2017)
            - (2) Scott Harris (born 1960)
          - (3) Alfred James Harris (born 1942)
            - (4) Dwayne Stephen Harris (born 1966)
      - Alfred Herschel Harris (1863–1953)
        - Christopher Money Harris (1907–1997)
          - (5) Robert Julian Brownlow Harris (born 1943)

== Arms ==
Coat of arms of Baron Harris

Crest
On a mural crown Or a royal tiger passant-guardant Vert striped Or spotted of the first pierced in the breast with an arrow of the last vulned Gules charged on the forehead with a Persian character for Ryder and crowned with an Eastern coronet both of the first.
Escutcheon
Vert on a chevron embattled, erminois between three hedgehogs Or, as many bombs Sable fired Proper a chief of augmentation thereon the gates and fortress of Seringapatam the draw-bridge let down and the Union flag of Great Britain and Ireland hoisted over the standard of Tippoo Sahib all Proper.
Supporters
Dexter a Grenadier soldier of the 73rd Regiment in his regimentals Proper supporting with his exterior hand a staff thereon hoisted the union flag of Great Britain and Ireland over that of the standard of Tippoo Sahib and beneath the tri-coloured flag entwined, inscribed with the word "Republique"; sinister a Malay soldier in his uniform Proper supporting a like staff thereon hoisted the flag of the East India Company Argent striped barwise Gules with a canton, over the standard of Tippoo Sahib with the tri-coloured flag entwined beneath as on the dexter inscribed with the word "Franeaise" all Proper.
Motto
My Prince And My Country.
