= Vernon Royle =

English cricketer (1854–1929)

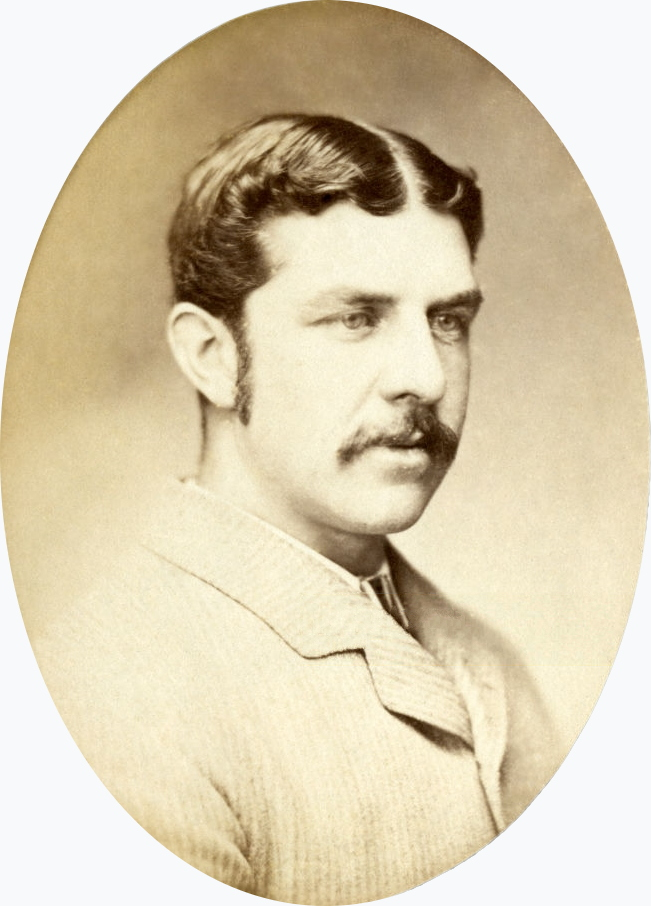

Personal information
- Born: 29 January 1854; Brooklands, Sale, England
- Died: 21 May 1929 (aged 75); Stanmore, Middlesex, England
- Batting: Right-handed
- Bowling: Right-arm slow

International information
- National side: England
- Only Test (cap 18): 2 January 1879 v Australia

Career statistics
Competition	Test	First-class
Matches	1	102
Runs scored	21	2,322
Batting average	10.50	15.48
100s/50s	0/0	0/9
Top score	18	81
Balls bowled	16	783
Wickets	0	15
Bowling average	–	25.06
5 wickets in innings	–	0
10 wickets in match	–	0
Best bowling	–	4/51
Catches/stumpings	2/–	69/–
- Source: CricInfo, 3 September 2022

The Reverend Vernon Peter Fanshawe Archer Royle (29 January 1854 – 21 May 1929) was an English first-class cricketer who played in a single Test match for England in Australia and later became a schoolmaster.

== Background and education ==
He was the third son of a surgeon, Peter Royle, and Mariann Fanshawe, and was educated at Rossall School and Brasenose College, Oxford.

== Cricket career ==
Royle played cricket for Lancashire from 1873 and for Oxford University in 1875 and 1876, winning a Blue both years. His record at Oxford was modest, and he passed 50 only once, making an unbeaten 67 in the match against Middlesex at Prince's Cricket Ground, Chelsea in 1876, when he batted at No 9 and where his runs were part of an Oxford total of 612, the highest score ever made at Prince's. After Oxford, he returned to fairly regular cricket for Lancashire for two seasons and in 1878 he hit his highest score, an innings of 81 against Kent at Town Malling.

Despite this fairly modest record as a batsman (which was little different from that of several other amateur members of the team), Royle was a member of Lord Harris's cricket team to tour Australia in 1878–79, which played one match against Australia. This game has since been recognised as a Test match, the third such game ever played; Royle scored 3 and 18 as the Australians won by 10 wickets, and he also took two catches. It was Royle's fielding that won particular attention on this tour, and was remembered in glowing terms 50 years later: "He was ambidextrous, very quick on his feet and smart in return," said the obituary in Wisden Cricketers' Almanack in 1930. He is generally regarded as being the greatest "cover point" of all time, and many books have described the fear he engendered in batsmen when on the pitch. Only a rash batsman dared to try for a quick run. A remark of Tom Emmett’s, the famous Yorkshire cricketer, is recalled in Royle's obituary in The Times: "Woa, mate, there's a policeman," he said when his partner called him for a short run while Royle was at cover point. In 1919, when The Times was wanting to make a comparison with Jack Hobbs' prowess as a cover-point field, it cited Gilbert Jessop and Syd Gregory, two long-standing and famous cricketers, plus the relatively unknown Vernon Royle, as Hobbs' only equals.

== After cricket ==
After the tour he retired from cricket and took up full-time teaching at Elstree School, though he returned to Lancashire and to various amateur teams for occasional matches through to 1886 and as late as 1891 played for Lancashire in a game against Marylebone Cricket Club (MCC) at Lord's. He later served as president of the Lancashire County Cricket Club.

He was ordained in 1892 when he was a schoolmaster at Elstree; he subsequently briefly became headmaster at Elstree before moving to Stanmore Park school, where he was headmaster from 1901 until his death.

== Publications ==
Royle kept a diary of his tour, which was published in 2001 as Lord Harris's Team in Australia 1878–79: The Diary of Vernon Royle. In it he outlines the lavish welcome afforded the touring party. Royle also briefly mentions his views on the Sydney Riot of 1879.
