= Francis MacKinnon =

English cricketer

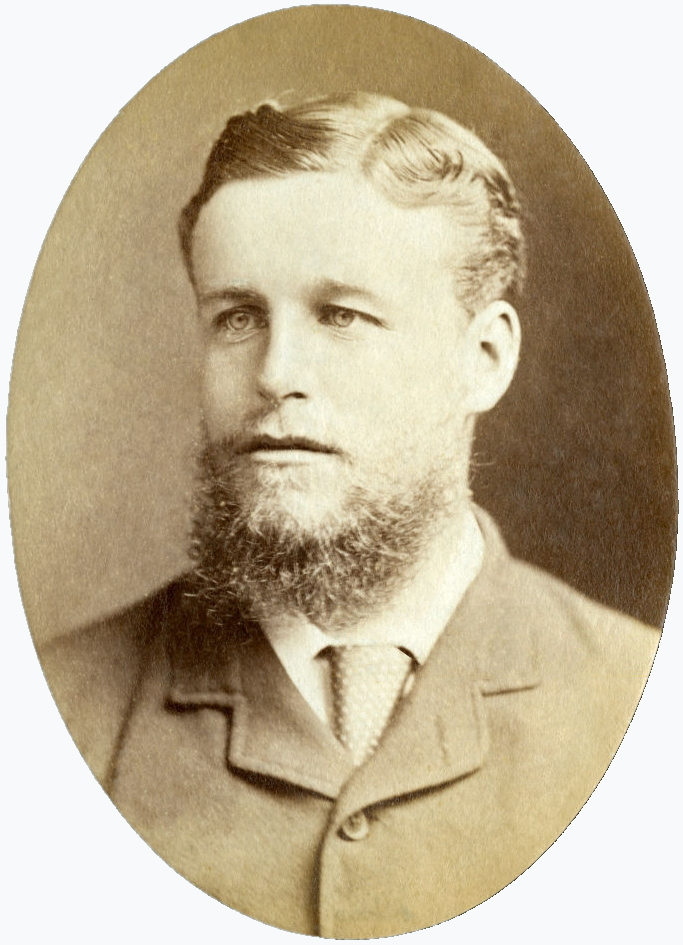

Personal information
- Full name: Francis Alexander MacKinnon
- Born: 9 April 1848; Kensington, London
- Died: 27 February 1947 (aged 98); Forres, Scotland
- Batting: Right-handed

International information
- National side: England
- Only Test (cap 17): 2 January 1879 v Australia

Domestic team information
- Years: Team
- 1870: Cambridge University
- 1875–1885: Kent

Career statistics
Competition	Test	First-class
Matches	1	88
Runs scored	5	2,310
Batting average	2.50	15.71
100s/50s	0/0	2/7
Top score	5	115
Catches/stumpings	0/–	38/–
- Source: Cricinfo, 3 October 2009

Francis Alexander MacKinnon, The 35th MacKinnon of MacKinnon DL (9 April 1848 – 27 February 1947) was the longest-lived Test cricketer until being surpassed by Eric Tindill of New Zealand on 8 November 2009. MacKinnon, who was 98 years, 324 days old when he died, was the oldest-ever first-class cricketer at that time.

MacKinnon was born at Acryse Park, near Folkestone in Kent, and was educated at Harrow School. An amateur cricketer, he joined the Marylebone Cricket Club (MCC) in 1870, and played first-class cricket from 1870 to 1885.

He attended St John's College, Cambridge, graduating in 1871. He played cricket for Cambridge University, winning his blue in 1870. He played in the famous University match in 1870, known as Cobden's Match, in which Cambridge's Frank Cobden conceded only one run and took three wickets in the last four-ball over to win the match by two runs.

MacKinnon played for Kent County Cricket Club from 1875. He toured Australia with Lord Harris in 1878–79, and played his only Test on this tour, making 0 and 5 in his two innings, bowled by Fred Spofforth twice. His first dismissal was the second in the first Test hat-trick. He was President of Kent in 1889.

In 1888, MacKinnon married the Hon. Emily Hood. They had one son and one daughter. His wife died in 1934.

He was a captain in the Royal East Kent Yeomanry from 1871 to 1893, promoted to honorary major in 1886 and resigned, but was re-appointed captain on 14 March 1900. He was a justice of the peace and Deputy Lieutenant for Kent from April 1900 to 1902. On the death of his father in 1903, he became The MacKinnon of Mackinnon, the 35th Chief of the Mackinnon Clan.

He died at his home, Drumduan, in Forres in Morayshire, Scotland.

== Bibliography ==
- Carlaw, Derek (2020). Kent County Cricketers, A to Z: Part One (1806–1914) (PDF). Cardiff: ACS.

Preceded by James Lillywhite	Oldest Living Test Cricketer; 25 October 1929 – 27 February 1947	Succeeded by Reginald Allen
