= George Cummins (priest) =

The Ven. George Cummins, MA was the inaugural Archdeacon of Trinidad, serving from 1842 until his death on 23 November 1872.

His daughter Sarah married George Harris, 3rd Baron Harris, the Governor of Trinidad.
