= Daniel Eliott =

Scottish civil servant (1798–1872)

Sir Daniel Eliott KCSI (3 March 1798 – 30 October 1872) was a Scottish civil servant in British India and governor of Madras.

== Biography ==
Eliott was the fourth son of Sir William Eliott, 6th Baronet and was born at Stobs Castle, Roxburghshire . He was educated at the University of Edinburgh, and Haileybury. having received a nomination for the East India Company's civil service, proceeded to Madras in 1817. He soon showed a decided aptitude for the study of Indian languages and Indian law. In 1822 he was appointed deputy Tamil translator, and in 1823 Maráthá translator to the Madras government, and deputy secretary to the board of revenue. In 1827 he became secretary to the board of revenue and in 1836 a member of the board. In December 1838 he was nominated, on account of his profound knowledge of the laws and customs of the Madras presidency, to be the Madras member of the Indian law commission then sitting at Calcutta under the presidency of Macaulay to draw up the Indian codes.

On 15 February 1848, he was appointed a member of the council at Madras, and in 1850 became president of the revenue, marine, and college boards of that government, and he returned to England in 1853 on completing his five years in that office. He did not expect to return to India, but when the East India Company decided in 1854 to form a supreme legislative council for all India, Eliott was appointed to represent Madras upon it. He accepted and remained in Calcutta as member of the legislative council until 1859 when he left India finally. When the Order of the Star of India was extended in 1866, and divided into three classes, Eliott was the first Madras civilian to receive the second class, and he became a Knight Commander of the Order in 1867.

Eliott died at The Boltons, West Brompton, on 30 October 1872.

== Family ==
In 1818 Eliott married Georgina Russell, daughter of General George Russell of the Bengal army, and together they had six daughters and four sons.
