= George Harris, 4th Baron Harris =

British amateur cricketer, colonial administrator and Governor of Bombay (1851–1932)

Colonel The Right Honourable The Lord Harris GCSI GCIE CB TD ADC
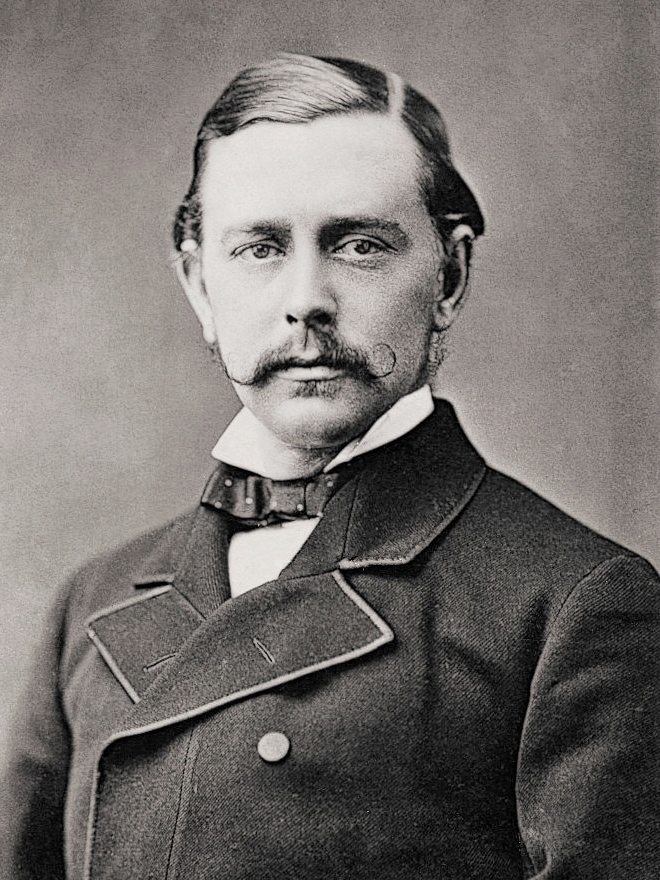
- Lord Harris in the 1880s

Personal information
- Full name: George Robert Canning Harris
- Born: 3 February 1851; St Ann's, Trinidad
- Died: 24 March 1932 (aged 81); Throwley, Kent
- Batting: Right-handed
- Bowling: Right-arm fast
- Role: Batsman
- Military Service
- Allegiance: Great Britain
- Branch: British Army
- Service years: 1880s – 1908
- Rank: Lieutenant-Colonel; Assistant Adjutant General
- Units: Royal East Kent Mounted Rifles; Imperial Yeomanry
- Conflicts: Second Boer War

International information
- National side: England
- Test debut (cap 13): 2 January 1879 v Australia
- Last Test: 11 August 1884 v Australia

Domestic team information
- Years: Team
- 1870–1911: Kent
- 1871–1895: Marylebone Cricket Club
- 1871–1874: Oxford University

Career statistics
Competition	Test	First-class
Matches	4	224
Runs scored	145	9,990
Batting average	29.00	26.85
100s/50s	0/1	11/55
Top score	52	176
Balls bowled	32	3,446
Wickets	0	75
Bowling average	–	23.44
5 wickets in innings	–	1
10 wickets in match	–	0
Best bowling	–	5/57
Catches/stumpings	2/–	190/–
- Source: CricInfo, 8 February 2015

Colonel George Robert Canning Harris, 4th Baron Harris, GCSI, GCIE, CB, TD, ADC (3 February 1851 – 24 March 1932), generally known as Lord Harris, was a British colonial administrator and Governor of Bombay, best known for developing cricket administration via Marylebone Cricket Club (MCC).

An English amateur cricketer, from 1870 to 1889, Lord Harris played for Kent and England, captaining both teams. He was President of the Kent County Football Association between 1881 and 1908, as well as serving as a government minister from 1885 to 1900.

== Early life ==
The Honourable George Harris was born at St Ann's, Trinidad, on 3 February 1851, the only son of George Harris, 3rd Baron Harris, and his wife Sarah Cummins, daughter of George Cummins. At the time of his birth, his father was serving as Governor of Trinidad (1846–1854). Harris barely knew his mother who died when he was two years old. In 1854, shortly after her death, the family moved to Madras where his father was posted as Governor. Harris senior retired in March 1859 and returned to England, becoming involved with Kent County Cricket Club as a Committee Member, before, in 1870, being elected Club President.

In 1864, at the age of 13, Harris was sent to Eton College to further his education. His first important cricket match was the 1868 Eton versus Harrow fixture at Lord's, when he was seventeen; he scored 23 and 6. In the same fixture the following year, when Cuthbert Ottaway scored 108 to seal victory for Eton by an innings and nineteen runs, Harris was out for 0. In 1870, his last year at Eton, he scored 12 and 7 against Harrow. In 1871, Harris went up to Christ Church, Oxford.

His father died in November 1872, whereupon Harris junior succeeded to the barony as 4th Baron Harris. He was already a first-class cricketer by then and was henceforward universally known in the sport as Lord Harris.

== Cricket career ==
=== Summary of playing career ===
Harris made his first-class debut for Kent in 1870 after he left Eton. Owing to his position in society, he was immediately elected to the club committee and was associated with Kent cricket for the rest of his life. He went up to Christ Church, Oxford in September 1870 and played for Oxford University from 1871 to 1874. He was available to play for Kent in the latter half of each of these seasons and became county captain in succession to South Norton in 1871, although his appointment was not made official until 1875 after he had come down from Oxford. Harris held the Kent captaincy until 1889.

He led the English cricket team in Australia and New Zealand in 1878–79 and was a central figure in the events of 8 February 1879 when a crowd riot erupted at a match in Sydney. The team had previously played a match against an All-Australia XI at the Melbourne Cricket Ground and this was later designated Test status as the third-ever Test match. Harris was therefore the second England Test captain after James Lillywhite. Australia, led by Dave Gregory, won the match by 10 wickets.

Harris captained England against Australia on three further occasions. In 1880 at The Oval, in what was later recognised as the inaugural Test match in England, England won by 5 wickets. Harris captained England in two of the Tests played in 1884, his team winning by an innings and 5 runs at Lord's and drawing the final match in the series at The Oval.

The full span of Harris' first-class cricket career was from 1870 to 1911, at 42 seasons one of the longest on record, though he made only seven appearances after 1889 when he relinquished the Kent captaincy so his essential playing career was from 1870 to 1889. He appeared in 224 first-class matches, including four Test matches, as a righthanded batsman who bowled right arm fast with a roundarm action. He scored 9,990 runs in first-class cricket with a highest score of 176 among eleven centuries and held 190 catches. He took 75 wickets with a best analysis of five for 57. Even in old age he was a capable cricketer, scoring a fifty for I Zingari v West Kent in his 71st year and 25 against Philadelphia Pilgrims at Lord's, 53 years after he had made his first appearance at the home of cricket.

=== Throwing issue ===
In the early 1880s, there were a number of bowlers who were widely considered to have unfair actions, with the Lancashire pair of Jack Crossland and George Nash coming in for particular criticism. After playing for Kent against Lancashire in 1885, when he faced the "bowling" of Crossland and Nash, Harris decided to take action. He persuaded the Kent committee to cancel the return fixture. Later that season, Crossland was found to have broken his residential qualification for Lancashire by living in Nottinghamshire, and Nash dropped out of the team. The two counties resumed playing each other the following season. Harris's Wisden obituarist wrote: "...there can be no doubt the action of Lord Harris, even if it did not entirely remove the throwing evil, had a very healthy effect on the game."

=== Administration ===
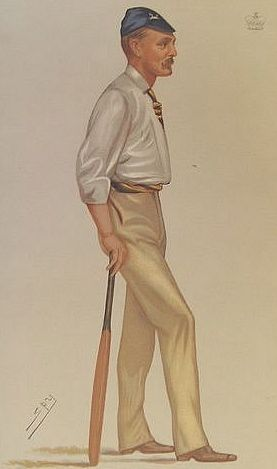
Lord Harris caricatured in Vanity Fair.

Harris had a long association with Lord's and Marylebone Cricket Club (MCC) as both player and administrator. In 1862, aged eleven, he was practising at Lord's. It was not till 1929, at the age of 78, that he played there for the last time, representing MCC vs Indian Gymkhana. He was President of MCC in 1895, a Trustee from 1906 to 1916 and Treasurer from 1916 to 1932. Additionally, he was at various times chairman of both the MCC finance and cricket sub-committees. Through these offices, Harris wielded considerable power in the world of cricket and it was written of him: "No man has exercised so strong an influence on the cricket world so long..."

In July 1909, Harris chaired a meeting of representatives of England, Australia and South Africa which launched the Imperial Cricket Conference and agreed rules to control Test cricket between the three nations. In 1926, he presided at a meeting at The Oval, when it was agreed that "governing bodies of cricket in countries within the Empire to which cricket teams are sent, or which send teams to England" should be eligible for ICC membership. The meeting had the effect of creating three new Test-playing nations: West Indies, New Zealand and India.

Harris was a controversial figure in the world of cricket, revered by cricket's MCC-based establishment but heavily criticised elsewhere. Not all thought that he used his power well. Alan Gibson once wrote that he was "an antediluvian old tyrant", though he later retracted this, saying that Harris was a more complex figure than that. Nonetheless, complex or not, Harris was never accused by contemporaries of being an intellectual. He might have robbed England of the services of one of its greatest batsmen, Wally Hammond, who had been born in Kent but chose to play for Gloucestershire, where he had gone to school. Hammond had not fulfilled the required period of residence to qualify for Gloucestershire and, once Harris became aware of this, Hammond was barred in 1922 from playing for them until the necessary time had elapsed. The affair resulted in Harris complaining about what he called "bolshevism" influencing cricket.

== Political and military career ==
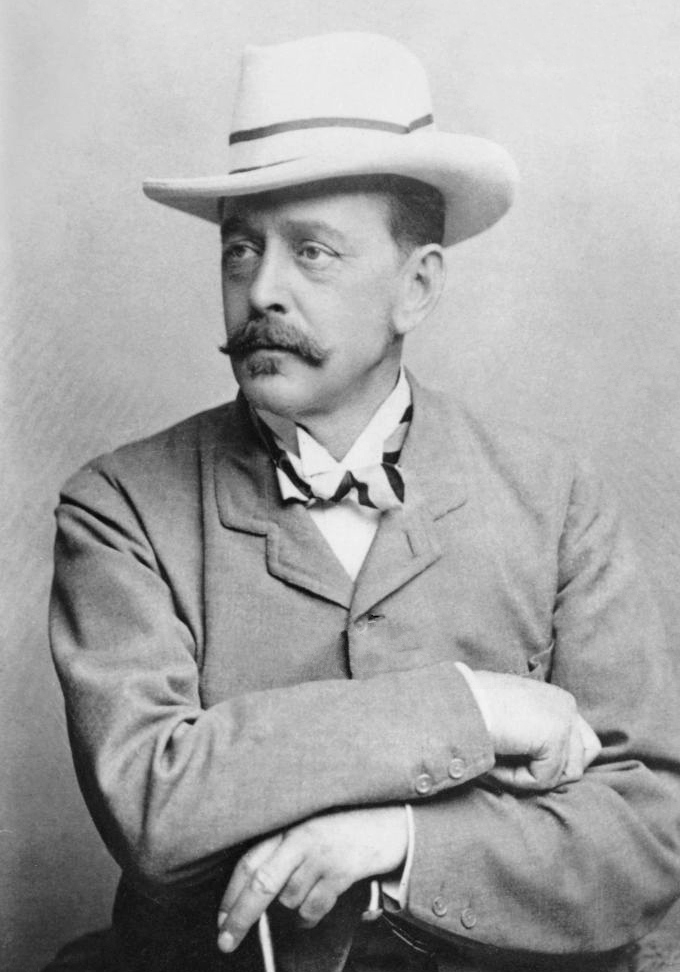
Lord Harris in 1906

Harris was politically active as a member of the Conservative Party, sitting in the House of Lords as Under-Secretary of State for India from 25 June 1885, then as Parliamentary Under-Secretary of State for War from 4 August 1886 to 1890. During the same period, he also worked as Under-Secretary of State for War, 1886–90; then as Vice-Lieutenant for Kent.

Appointed Governor of the Presidency of Bombay in British India from 1890 to 1895, Harris also served in the Yeomanry and was charged with the Sovereign's Sceptre and dove at the Coronation of Edward VII and Alexandra.

=== Bombay ===
Lord Harris' governorship of Bombay was not without extensive criticism, with one anonymous writer penning a poem expressing the hope that Bombay would not suffer too greatly from Harris' political inexperience. He was mainly notable for his enthusiastic pursuit of cricket amongst his fellow Europeans in the colony, at the expense of connecting with the native population. When the interracial Bombay riots of 1893 broke out, Harris was out of the city at Poona enjoying cricket matches. He returned to Bombay only on the ninth day of rioting, and then primarily to attend a cricket match there.

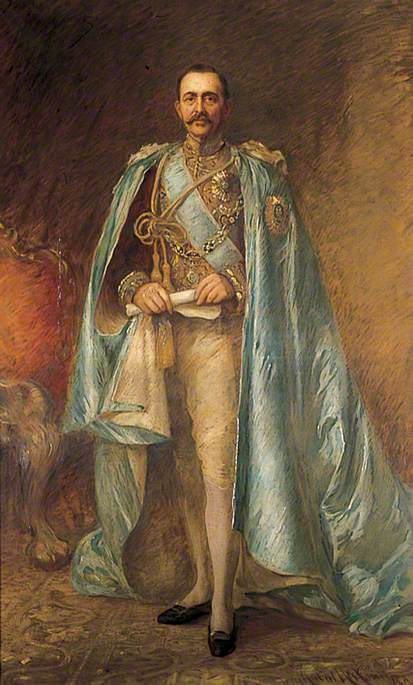
Lord Harris as Knight Grand Commander of the Order of the Star of India

Some writers credit Harris with almost single-handedly introducing and developing the sport in India. Although cricket was well established among the natives before his arrival, he did much to promote it. However, in 1890, he rejected a petition signed by over 1,000 locals to relocate European polo players to another ground so that the locals could use the area for cricket matches. It was only in 1892 that he granted a parcel of land to the newly formed Muslim Gymkhana for a cricket field, adjacent to land already used by the Parsee Gymkhana. His reluctance to do so is evident in his written comment:

I don't see how we can refuse these applicants; but I will steadfastly refuse any more grants once a Gymkhana has been established under respectable auspices by each nationality, and tell applicants that ground having been set apart for their nationality they are free to take advantage of it by joining that particular club.

When Harris left India, having virtually ignored famine, riots and sectarian unrest, a publisher circulated a collection of newspaper extracts from his time as governor. The introduction stated:

Never during the last hundred years has a Governor of Bombay been so sternly criticised and never has he met with such widespread unpopularity on account of his administration as Lord Harris.

Harris was appointed Knight Grand Commander of the Order of the Star of India in May 1895.

=== Later career ===
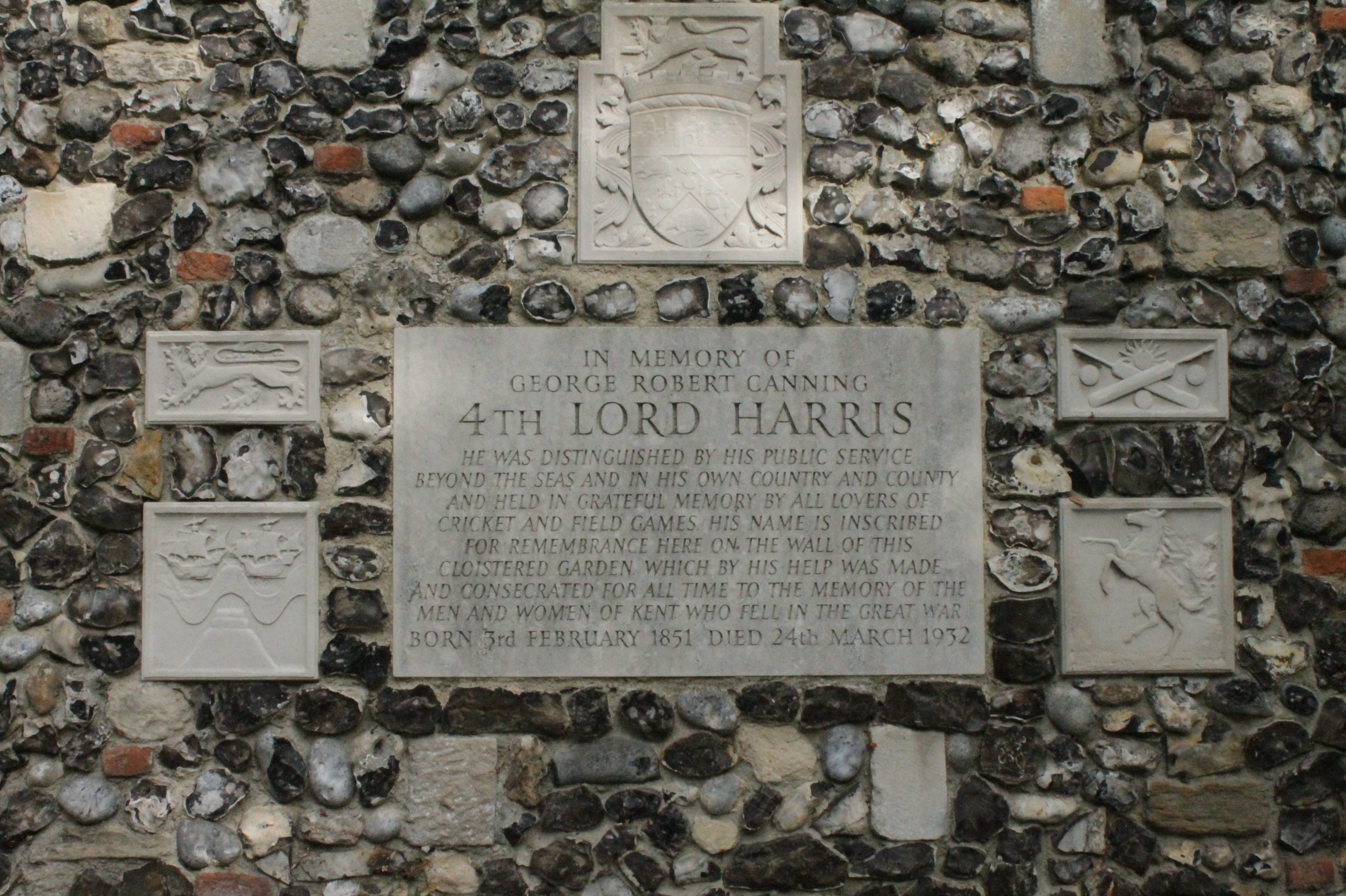
Memorial to Lord Harris at Canterbury Cathedral

On his return to England, Harris again served in the Conservative Government as a Lord-in-Waiting to Queen Victoria from 16 July 1895 to 4 December 1900.

He was commissioned as a Captain in the Royal East Kent Yeomanry on 8 March 1873 and was appointed Lieutenant-Colonel in command on 6 October 1897. During the Second Boer War, he served in South Africa as Assistant Adjutant-General for the Imperial Yeomanry from 28 February 1900, until he resigned in April 1901. He was appointed Honorary Colonel of the 1st Volunteer Battalion, Buffs (East Kent Regiment), on 16 March 1889.

== Death and family ==
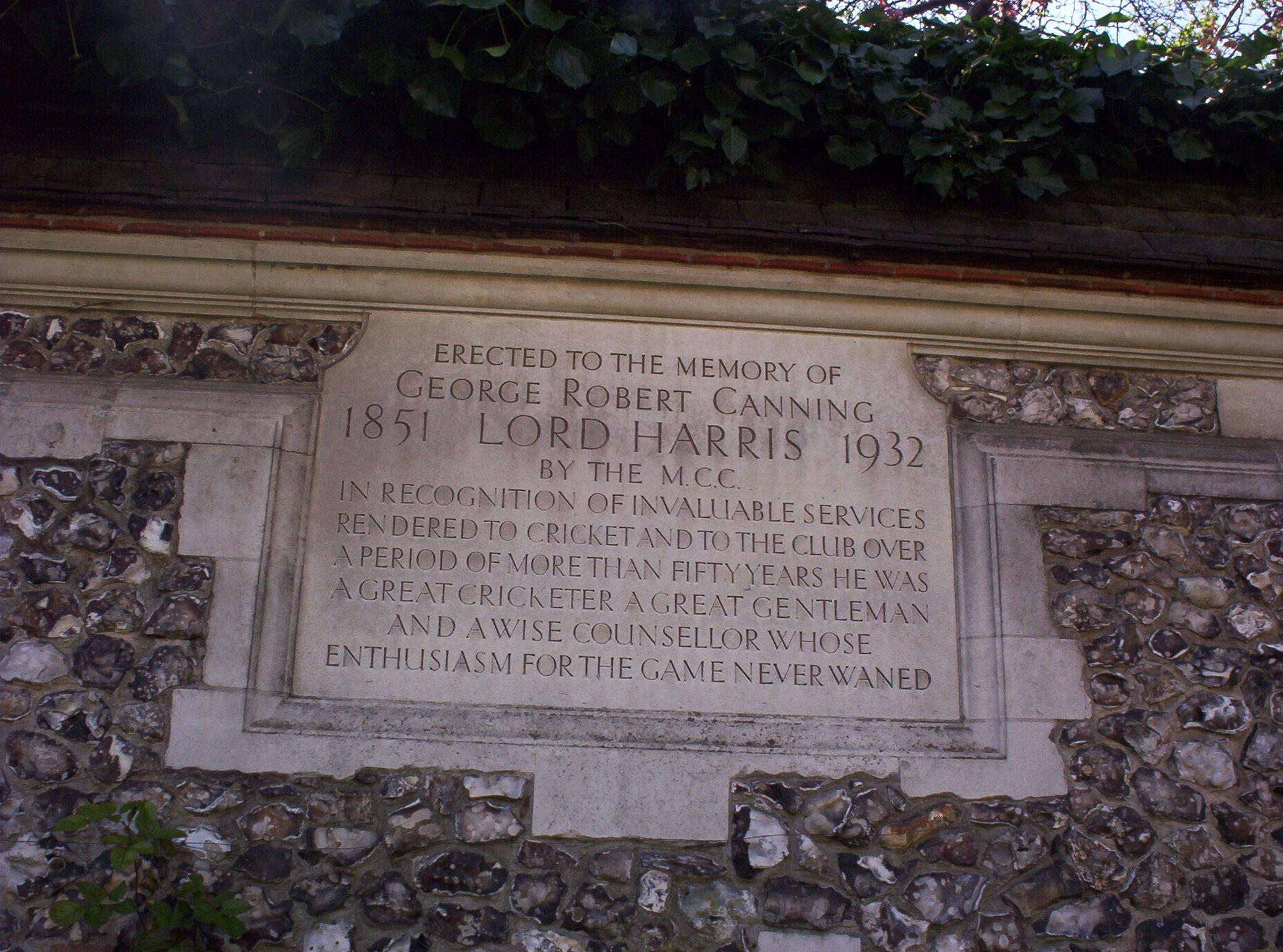
Memorial in the Harris Garden at Lord's

In 1874, he married the Honourable Lucy Ada Jervis (died 1930), daughter of Carnegie Robert John Jervis, 3rd Viscount St Vincent.

Lord Harris died in 1932, aged 82, being succeeded in the barony by his only child, George, as 5th Baron Harris.

== See also ==
- Baron Harris

== Arms ==
Coat of arms of George Harris, 4th Baron Harris

Crest
On a mural crown Or a royal tiger passant-guardant Vert striped Or spotted of the First pierced in the breast with an arrow of the Last vulned Gules charged on the forehead with a Persian character for Ryder and crowned with an Eastern coronet both of the First.
Escutcheon
Vert on a chevron embattled erminois between three hedgehogs Or as many bombs Sable fired Proper a chief of augmentation thereon the gates and fortress of Seringapatam the draw-bridge let down and the Union flag of Great Britain and Ireland hoisted over the standard of Tippoo Sahib all Proper.
Supporters
Dexter, a Grenadier soldier of the 73rd Regiment in his regimentals Proper supporting with his exterior hand a staff thereon hoisted the Union Flag of Great Britain and Ireland over that of the standard of Tippoo Sahib and beneath the tri-coloured flag entwined, inscribed with the word "Republique"; sinister a Malay soldier in his uniform Proper supporting a like staff thereon hoisted the flag of the East India Company Argent striped barwise Gules with a canton, over the standard of Tippoo Sahib with the tri-coloured flag entwined beneath as on the dexter inscribed with the word "Franeaise" all Proper.
Motto
My Prince And My Country.

Sporting positions
Preceded by South Norton	Kent County Cricket Club captain 1875–1889	Succeeded by Frank Marchant and William Patterson
Preceded by James Lillywhite	English national cricket captain 1878/79–1880	Succeeded by Alfred Shaw
Preceded by Hon. Ivo Bligh	English national cricket captain 1884	Succeeded by Arthur Shrewsbury
Political offices
Preceded by John Kynaston Cross	Under-Secretary of State for India; 1885–1886	Succeeded by Sir Ughtred Kay-Shuttleworth
Preceded by The Lord Sandhurst	Under-Secretary of State for War; 1886–1890	Succeeded by The Earl Brownlow
Preceded by The Lord Reay	Governor of Bombay; 1890–1895	Succeeded by The Lord Sandhurst
Preceded by The Lord Hawkesbury	Lord-in-Waiting; 1895–1900	Succeeded by The Lord Kenyon
Peerage of the United Kingdom
Preceded by George Harris (3rd Baron)	Baron Harris; 1872–1932	Succeeded by George Harris (5th Baron)
