= 1893–94 Sheffield Shield season =

Australian cricket tournament

1893–94 Sheffield Shield
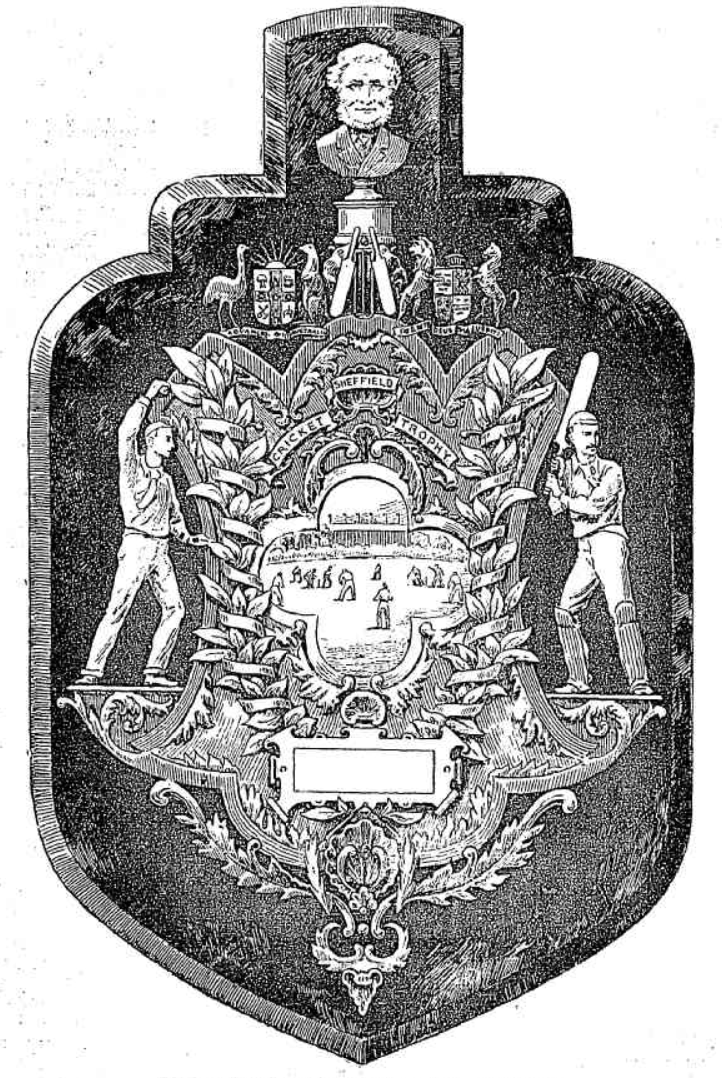
- Artist's sketch of the Sheffield Shield Trophy, 1894.
- Cricket format: First-class
- Tournament format: Double round-robin
- Champions: South Australia (1st title)
- Participants: 3
- Matches: 6
- Most runs: George Giffen (South Australia) – 526 runs
- Most wickets: Charles Turner (New South Wales) – 30 wickets

The 1893–94 Sheffield Shield season was the second season of the Sheffield Shield, the domestic first-class cricket competition of Australia. The season took place between 15 December 1893 to 7 March 1894 and was contested by three teams. The competition would be won by South Australia who won three of their four matches. George Giffen scored the most runs in the competition with 526 runs while Charles Turner took the most wickets with 30.

== Table ==
Team	Pld	W	L
South Australia	4	3	1
New South Wales	4	2	2
Victoria	4	1	3

- The order of the table was determined by the number of matches won by each team.
- Pld: matches played; W: won; L: lost
- Source: CricInfo

== Fixtures ==
15–19 December 1893
Scorecard

(H) South Australia	v	New South Wales
106 (52.3 overs); George Giffen 47; Sydney Callaway 5/55 (23.3 overs)		118 (40.2 overs); Harry Donnan 26; Ernie Jones 5/50 (18.2 overs)
483 (181.1 overs); George Giffen 205; Andrew Newell 7/190 (75.1 overs)		234 (70.3 overs); Sydney Callaway 71; George Giffen 2/63 (21 overs)

South Australia won by 237 runs
Adelaide Oval, Adelaide
Umpires: Jack Tooher and George Downs

- South Australia won the toss and elected to bat.

23–30 December 1893
Scorecard

New South Wales	v	Victoria (H)
155 (95.2 overs); Harry Moses 71; Harry Trott 5/44 (20.2 overs)		126 (60.5 overs); John Stuckey 29; Charles Turner 5/58 (29.5 overs)
174 (112.2 overs); Billy Murdoch 64; Hugh Trumble 3/28 (19 overs)		7/204 (79.4 overs); Harry Graham 68; Charles Turner 5/84 (31.1 overs)

Victoria won by 3 wickets
Melbourne Cricket Ground, Melbourne
Umpires: Jack Tooher and Jim Phillips

- New South Wales won the toss and elected to bat.

1–4 January 1894
Scorecard

South Australia	v	Victoria (H)
272 (105.5 overs); Joe Darling 63; Charlie McLeod 5/58 (30.5 overs)		181 (64.5 overs); William Bruce 56; George Giffen 4/56 (17.5 overs)
281 (136.3 overs); George Giffen 103; Jack Harry 4/20 (12.3 overs)		298 (115.4 overs); Frank Walters 95; Fred Jarvis 4/62 (31.4 overs)

South Australia won by 74 runs
Melbourne Cricket Ground, Melbourne
Umpires: Tom Flynn and Philip Argall

- South Australia won the toss and elected to bat.

6–9 January 1894
Scorecard

South Australia	v	New South Wales (H)
117 (45.4 overs); Harry Blinman 25; Charles Turner 4/47 (23 overs)		393 (120.2 overs); Harry Moses 104; Fred Jarvis 4/95 (31 overs)
118 (38.5 overs); Jack Reedman 37; Arthur Coningham 5/46 (19 overs)

New South Wales won by an innings and 158 runs
Association Ground, Sydney
Umpires: Jack Tooher and Philip Argall

- South Australia won the toss and elected to bat.

26–30 January 1894
Scorecard

(H) New South Wales	v	Victoria
127 (48.4 overs); Sydney Callaway 38; Charlie McLeod 6/64 (21 overs)		88 (27 overs); Hugh Trumble 26; Charles Turner 6/51 (14 overs)
151 (67.1 overs); Sydney Callaway 50; Hugh Trumble 3/45 (28 overs)		171 (87.1 overs); Harry Graham 45; Charles Turner 5/59 (39 overs)

New South Wales won by 19 runs
Association Ground, Sydney
Umpires: Jack Tooher and Tom Flynn

- Victoria won the toss and elected to field.

2–7 March 1894
Scorecard

(H) South Australia	v	Victoria
316 (128.5 overs); Jack Reedman 113; Charlie McLeod 5/77 (38 overs)		222 (82 overs); Jack Harry 50; Fred Jarvis 4/56 (27 overs)
276 (114 overs); Jack Lyons 101; Charlie McLeod 4/51 (34 overs)		312 (110.4 overs); Jack Harry 82; Ernie Jones 5/73 (23 overs)

South Australia won by 58 runs
Adelaide Oval, Adelaide
Umpires: Jim Phillips and George Downs

- South Australia won the toss and elected to bat.

== Statistics ==
=== Most Runs ===
George Giffen scored the most runs for the 1893–94 season with 526 runs from eight innings which included 205 runs in the first innings of the game between South Australia and New South Wales at the Adelaide Oval. The two next highest scorers were also South Australians, with Jack Lyons and Jack Reedman finishing second and third respectively.

Player	Team	Matches	Innings	Not Out	Runs	HS	Average	100s	50s
George Giffen	South Australia	4	8	1	526	205	75.14	2	1
Jack Lyons	South Australia	4	8	0	319	101	39.87	1	1
Jack Reedman	South Australia	4	8	0	251	113	31.37	1	0
Jack Harry	Victoria	4	8	1	223	82	31.85	0	2
Sydney Callaway	New South Wales	4	7	1	220	71	36.66	0	3

=== Most wickets ===
Charlie Turner took the most wickets for the 1893–94 season with 30 wickets from his three matches which two 10-wicket matches, both of them against New South Wales. Second place was Charlie McLeod from South Australia while Andrew Newell finished third as he recorded the best figures of the season against South Australia at the Adelaide Oval.

Player	Team	Matches	Overs	Runs	Wickets	Average	BBI
Charles Turner	Victoria	3	156.5	369	30	12.30	6/51
Charlie McLeod	South Australia	4	236.5	421	27	15.59	6/64
Andrew Newell	New South Wales	4	183.5	401	22	18.22	7/190
Ernie Jones	South Australia	4	148.4	389	19	20.47	5/50
Harry Trott	New South Wales	4	149.3	395	18	21.94	5/44
