= 1895–96 Sheffield Shield season =

Australian cricket tournament

1895–96 Sheffield Shield
- Cricket format: First-class
- Tournament format: Double round-robin
- Champions: New South Wales (1st title)
- Participants: 3
- Matches: 6
- Most runs: Frank Iredale (New South Wales) – 469 runs
- Most wickets: Tom McKibbin (New South Wales) – 31 wickets

The 1895–96 Sheffield Shield season was the fourth season of the Sheffield Shield, the domestic first-class cricket competition of Australia. New South Wales won the championship.

== Table ==
Team	Pld	W	L	D
New South Wales	4	3	1	0
Victoria	4	2	2	0
South Australia	4	1	3	0

== Fixtures ==
9–13 November 1895
Scorecard

Victoria	v	South Australia (H)
220 (74.2 overs); Harry Graham 50; Ernie Jones 3/51 (21.2 overs)		163 (58.3 overs); Clem Hill 60; Jack Harry 4/15 (7 overs)
329 (99.5 overs); Jack Harry 107; George Giffen 5/141 (41.5 overs)		320 (77.5 overs); Fred Jarvis 68; John Carlton 3/39 (10.5 overs)

Victoria won by 66 runs
Adelaide Oval, Adelaide
Umpires: Bob Crockett and George Downs

- Victoria won the toss and elected to bat.

26–31 December 1895
Scorecard

(H) New South Wales	v	Victoria
407 (202.2 overs); Harry Donnan 160; Albert Trott 5/77 (35 overs)		357 (135.3 overs); Harry Graham 103; Tom McKibbin 4/157 (52 overs)
331 (142.2 overs); Tom Garrett 70; Albert Trott 4/94 (39.2 overs)		258 (98.3 overs); William Bruce 90; Tom McKibbin 8/93 (39.3 overs)

New South Wales won by 123 runs
Melbourne Cricket Ground, Melbourne
Umpires: Jim Phillips and Jack Tooher

- New South Wales won the toss and elected to bat.

3–6 January 1896
Scorecard

New South Wales	v	South Australia (H)
320 (117.5 overs); Harry Donnan 93; Ernie Jones 7/103 (43 overs)		152 (60.3 overs); George Giffen 74; Tom McKibbin 4/61 (23 overs)
		134 f/o (44.1 overs); Joe Darling 33; Bill Howell 5/49 (22.1 overs)

New South Wales won by an innings and 34 runs
Adelaide Oval, Adelaide
Umpires: Isaac Fisher and Jack Tooher

- New South Wales won the toss and elected to bat.

25–30 January 1896
Scorecard

(H) New South Wales	v	Victoria
187 (96.3 overs); Frank Iredale 56; Hugh Trumble 5/61 (43 overs)		319 (133 overs); Charlie McLeod 100; Tom McKibbin 4/114 (35 overs)
335 (138.1 overs); Alick Mackenzie 97; Jack Harry 4/53 (21 overs)		6/207 (70.2 overs); Charlie McLeod 50; Tom McKibbin 3/85 (22.2 overs)

Victoria won by 4 wickets
Sydney Cricket Ground, Sydney
Umpires: Jim Phillips and Jack Tooher

- Victoria won the toss and elected to field.

21–24 February 1896
Scorecard

(H) Victoria	v	South Australia
165 (36 overs); Frank Laver 50; George Giffen 4/94 (17 overs)		199 (79 overs); Jack Reedman 60; John Carlton 4/44 (26 overs)
43 (23.4 overs); Harry Trott 13; Ernie Jones 6/15 (12 overs)		0/10 (3.5 overs); Ernie Jones 7*

South Australia won by 10 wickets
Melbourne Cricket Ground, Melbourne
Umpires: Bob Crockett and T. A. Reeves

- South Australia won the toss and elected to field.

28 February – 4 March 1896
Scorecard

(H) South Australia	v	New South Wales
400 (130.2 overs); Clem Hill 206*; Tom McKibbin 3/124 (42 overs)		428 (135.2 overs); Frank Iredale 187; Ernie Jones 4/110 (47 overs)
200 (106.3 overs); George Giffen 55; Charles Turner 6/35 (43.3 overs)		1/173 (75.4 overs); Frank Iredale 80*

New South Wales won by 9 wickets
Sydney Cricket Ground, Sydney
Umpires: Jack Tooher and T. A. Reeves

- South Australia won the toss and elected to bat.

== Statistics ==
=== Most Runs ===
Frank Iredale 469

=== Most Wickets ===
Tom McKibbin 31
