= 1894–95 Sheffield Shield season =

Australian cricket tournament

1894–95 Sheffield Shield
- Cricket format: First-class
- Tournament format: Double round-robin
- Champions: Victoria (2nd title)
- Participants: 3
- Matches: 6
- Most runs: Syd Gregory (New South Wales) – 339 runs
- Most wickets: George Giffen (South Australia) – 43 wickets

The 1894–95 Sheffield Shield season was the third season of the Sheffield Shield, the domestic first-class cricket competition of Australia. Victoria won the championship. South Australia's Giffen, who had scored the most runs in the 1993–94 season, took the most wickets in this season.

== Table ==
Team	Pld	W	L	D
Victoria	4	3	1	0
South Australia	4	2	2	0
New South Wales	4	1	3	0

== Fixtures ==
30 November – 3 December 1894
Scorecard

Victoria	v	South Australia (H)
252 (88.1 overs); Jack Worrall 47; George Giffen 6/87 (34 overs)		358 (160.2 overs); Robert Dyer 102; Charlie McLeod 3/81 (48.2 overs)
134 (56.5 overs); Jack Harry 45; George Giffen 6/60 (25.5 overs)		0/29 (5.5 overs); Jack Lyons 19*

South Australia won by 10 wickets
Adelaide Oval, Adelaide
Umpires: George Searcy and Tom Flynn

- Victoria won the toss and elected to bat.

22–27 December 1894
Scorecard

(H) Victoria	v	New South Wales
175 (84.2 overs); Jack Harry 29; Charles Turner 4/64 (31.2 overs)		66 (33.5 overs); Frank Iredale 24; Bob McLeod 6/20 (16.5 overs)
246 (107.3 overs); Jack Worrall 96; Charles Turner 4/65 (40.3 overs)		194 (82.1 overs); Syd Gregory 101; Albert Trott 5/55 (32.1 overs)

Victoria won by 161 runs
Melbourne Cricket Ground, Melbourne
Umpires: E. J. Briscoe and Tom Flynn

- Victoria won the toss and elected to bat.

5–9 January 1895
Scorecard

New South Wales	v	South Australia (H)
192 (93.2 overs); Tom Garrett 48; George Giffen 8/77 (43.2 overs)		270 (120.3 overs); Affie Jarvis 98*; Sydney Callaway 5/108 (43.3 overs)
247 (96.1 overs); Harry Moses 77; George Giffen 8/109 (48.1 overs)		6/170 (76.4 overs); Harry Blinman 67*; Bill Howell 4/55 (24 overs)

South Australia won by 4 wickets
Adelaide Oval, Adelaide
Umpires: E. J. Briscoe and George Downs

- New South Wales won the toss and elected to bat.

25–31 January 1895
Scorecard

Victoria	v	New South Wales (H)
181 (68.3 overs); Charlie McLeod 31; Tom McKibbin 5/36 (13.3 overs)		274 (107.1 overs); Frank Iredale 86; Bob McLeod 4/50 (15.1 overs)
247 (105 overs); Frank Laver 65; Charles Turner 4/56 (36 overs)		99 (48.3 overs); Syd Gregory 24; Harry Trott 5/31 (14 overs)

Victoria won by 55 runs
Sydney Cricket Ground, Sydney
Umpires: Bob Crockett and Charles Bannerman

- Victoria won the toss and elected to bat.

15–19 February 1895
Scorecard

(H) Victoria	v	South Australia
348 (128.5 overs); Harry Trott 152; Ernie Jones 5/71 (23.1 overs)		118 (57.1 overs); Clem Hill 33; Albert Trott 4/24 (13.1 overs)
0/16 (4.5 overs); William Bruce 12*		245 f/o (54 overs); Jack Lyons 135; Harry Trott 4/70 (17 overs)

Victoria won by 10 wickets
Melbourne Cricket Ground, Melbourne
Umpires: Isaac Fisher and Tom Flynn

- Victoria won the toss and elected to bat.

22–26 February 1895
Scorecard

(H) New South Wales	v	South Australia
239 (76.5 overs); Tom Garrett 82; George Giffen 4/114 (37.5 overs)		304 (96.4 overs); Robert Dyer 71; Tom McKibbin 6/123 (36.4 overs)
336 (100.2 overs); Frank Iredale 91; George Giffen 6/132 (50.2 overs)		160 (62.5 overs); George Giffen 65; Tom McKibbin 8/66 (28.5 overs)

New South Wales won by 111 runs
Sydney Cricket Ground, Sydney
Umpires: Charles Bannerman and Isaac Fisher

- New South Wales won the toss and elected to bat.

== Statistics ==
=== Most Runs ===
Syd Gregory 339

=== Most Wickets ===
George Giffen 43
