= English cricket team in Australia in 1894–95 =

International cricket tour

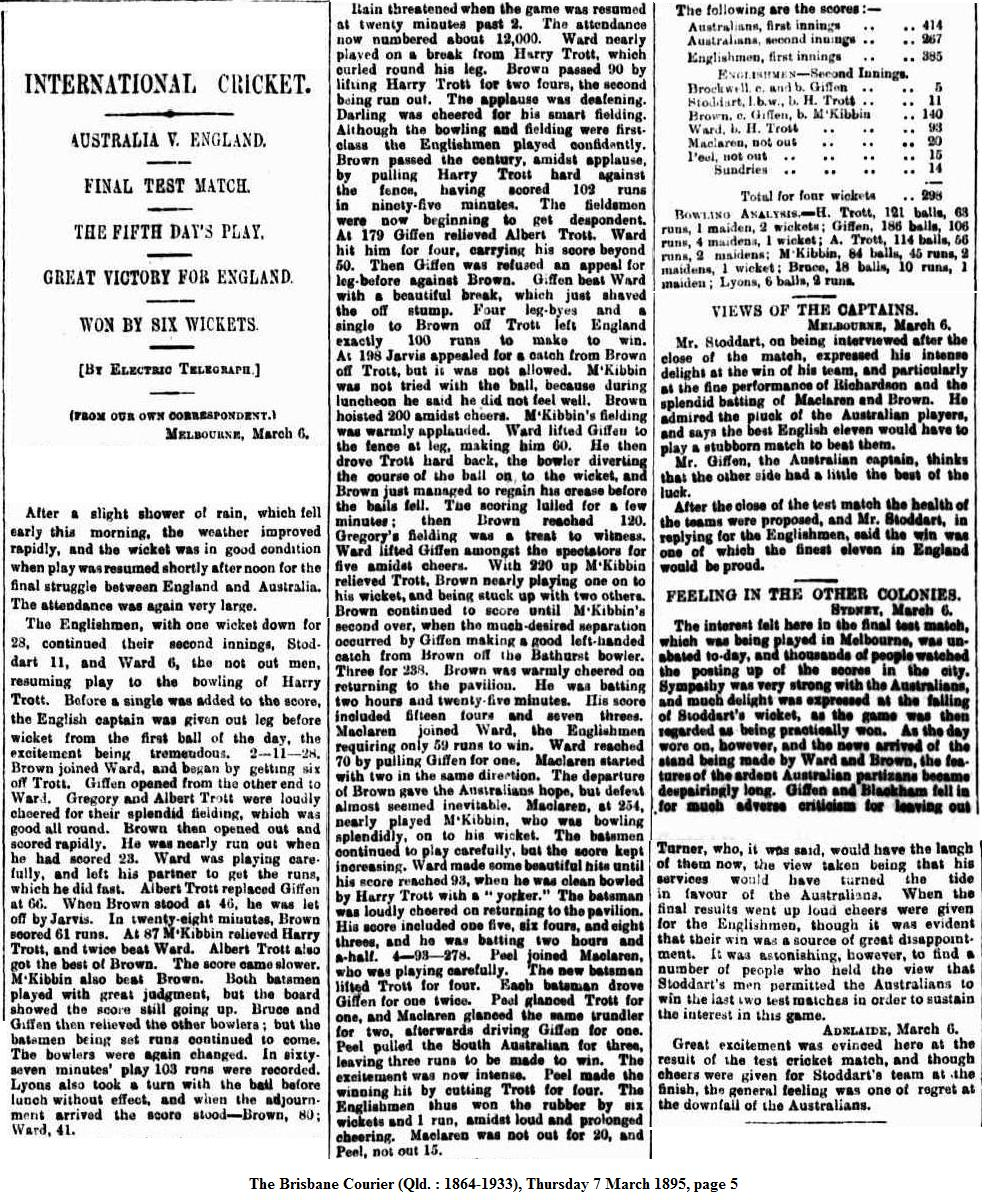
1895 newspaper article describing the fifth day of the final deciding Ashes match

The England cricket team toured Australia and Ceylon in 1894–95. The team, captained by Andrew Stoddart, played 24 matches in total, of which it won 10, drew 10 and lost 4. In first-class cricket, the team played 12, won 8 and lost 4.

Five Test matches were played. England won 3–2 after Australia had recovered from 0–2 down to 2–2 with the final match a true decider. The first Test, won by England, was the first of only four Tests in history to be won by a side forced to follow on.

In addition to the Test series, England played first-class matches against the Australian colonial teams: New South Wales, Queensland, South Australia and Victoria.

== Test series summary ==
=== First Test ===
14–20 December 1894
(Timeless Test)
Scorecard

| Australia | v | England |
| 586 (172.3 overs); SE Gregory 201; T Richardson 5/181 (55.3 overs) | | 325 (140.3 overs); A Ward 75; G Giffen 4/75 (43 overs) |
| 166 (68 overs); J Darling 53; R Peel 6/67 (30 overs) | | 437 (f/o) (181.4 overs); A Ward 117; G Giffen 4/164 (75 overs) |

England won by 10 runs
Sydney Cricket Ground, Sydney
Umpires: C Bannerman and J Phillips

- Australia won the toss and elected to bat.
- 16 December was taken as a rest day.
- J Darling, FA Iredale, JC Reedman, CE McLeod and E Jones (all AUS), and AC MacLaren, JT Brown, FGJ Ford and LH Gay (all ENG) made their Test debuts.
- This was the first time in Test history that a side won after following on.

=== Second Test ===
29 December 1894–3 January 1895
(Timeless Test)
Scorecard

| England | v | Australia |
| 75 (40.1 overs); A Ward 30; CTB Turner 5/32 (20 overs) | | 123 (55.5 overs); G Giffen 32; J Darling 32; T Richardson 5/57 (23 overs) |
| 475 (202.2 overs); AE Stoddart 173; G Giffen 6/155 (78.2 overs) | | 333 (136.1 overs); GHS Trott 95; R Peel 4/77 (40.1 overs) |

England won by 94 runs
Melbourne Cricket Ground, Melbourne
Umpires: T Flynn and J Phillips

- Australia won the toss and elected to field.
- 30 December was taken as a rest day.
- A Coningham (AUS) made his Test debut.

=== Third Test ===
11–15 January 1895
(Timeless Test)
Scorecard

| Australia | v | England |
| 238 (81.1 overs); G Giffen 58; T Richardson 5/75 (21.1 overs) | | 124 (57.3 overs); JT Brown 39*; ST Callaway 5/37 (26.3 overs) |
| 411 (115.2 overs); FA Iredale 140; R Peel 4/96 (34 overs) | | 143 (67.1 overs); AC MacLaren 35; AE Trott 8/43 (27 overs) |

Australia won by 382 runs
Adelaide Oval, Adelaide
Umpires: J Phillips and GHG Searcy

- Australia won the toss and elected to bat.
- 13 January was taken as a rest day
- J Harry and AE Trott (both AUS) made their Test debuts.

=== Fourth Test ===
1–4 February 1895
(Timeless Test)
Scorecard

| Australia | v | England |
| 284 (83.5 overs); H Graham 105; J Briggs 4/65 (22 overs) | | 65 (38.5 overs); JT Brown 20*; G Giffen 3/14 (5.5 overs) |
| | | 72 (f/o) (29.1 overs); W Brockwell 17; G Giffen 5/26 (15 overs) |

Australia won by an innings and 147 runs
Sydney Cricket Ground, Sydney
Umpires: C Bannerman and J Phillips

- England won the toss and elected to field.
- 3 February was taken as a rest day.
- There was no play on the second day

=== Fifth Test ===
1–6 March 1895
(Timeless Test)
Scorecard

| Australia | v | England |
| 414 (148.4 overs); J Darling 74; R Peel 4/114 (48 overs) | | 385 (133 overs); AC MacLaren 120; GHS Trott 4/71 (24 overs) |
| 267 (123.2 overs); G Giffen 51; T Richardson 6/104 (45.2 overs) | | 298/4 (88.1 overs); JT Brown 140; GHS Trott 2/63 (20.1 overs) |

England won by 6 wickets
Melbourne Cricket Ground, Melbourne
Umpires: T Flynn and J Phillips

- Australia won the toss and elected to bat.
- 3 March was taken as a rest day
- TR McKibbin (AUS) made his Test debut.

== Players ==
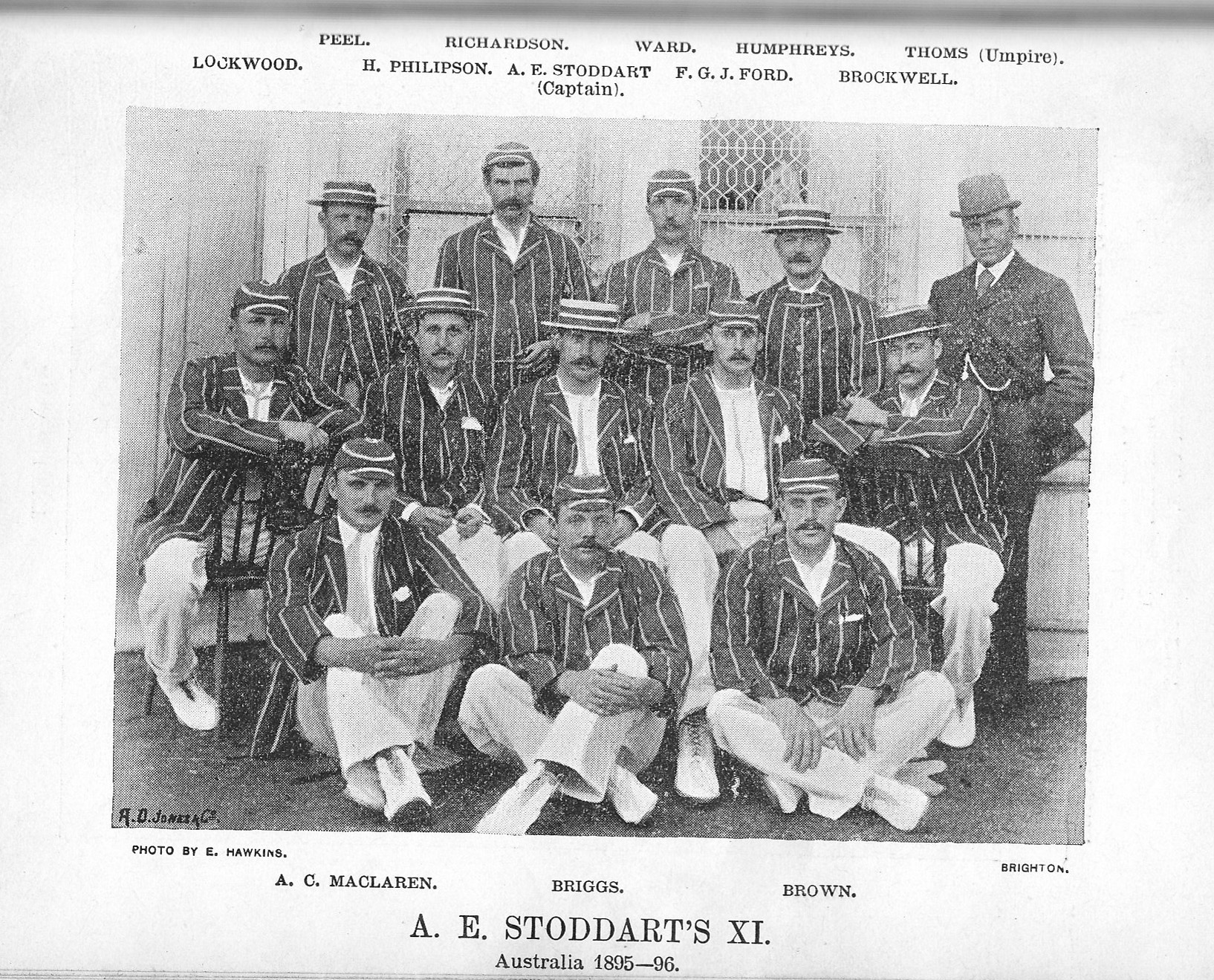

England was captained by Andrew Stoddart and had Hylton Philipson as its specialist wicket-keeper, the other players being Johnny Briggs, Bobby Peel, Jack Brown, Tom Richardson, Bill Lockwood, Archie MacLaren, Albert Ward, Bill Brockwell, Francis Ford, Walter Humphreys and Leslie Gay.

Australia was captained in the first Test by Jack Blackham who was also the wicket-keeper. He was then replaced by George Giffen as captain and by Affie Jarvis as keeper. Other players to represent Australia were Jack Lyons, Charlie Turner, Harry Trott, Syd Gregory, Joe Darling, Frank Iredale, Ernie Jones, Charlie McLeod, John Reedman, Hugh Trumble, Arthur Coningham, Albert Trott, Jack Worrall, Harry Graham and Tom McKibbin.

== Ceylon ==
The team used Colombo as a stopover during its long sea voyage and played against local sides that were not first-class. This was the fifth time that an English cricket team had visited Ceylon but it was not until 1911–12 that another arrived.
