= English cricket team in Australia in 1891–92 =

International cricket tour

The England national cricket team toured Australia and Ceylon in 1891–92.

The team, captained by W. G. Grace, was organised, financed and managed by Lord Sheffield, who later donated the Sheffield Shield to Australian domestic first-class cricket.

29 matches were played in total, of which 12 were won, two lost and 15 drawn. Eight of the games were first-class games, including three Tests against Australia. Australia won the Test series 2–1. It marked Australia's first Ashes victory, with the first eight being won by England.

The other five first-class matches were against New South Wales (twice), South Australia and Victoria (twice).

== Test series summary ==
Australia won the Test series 2–1.

=== First Test ===
1–6 January 1892
(Timeless Test)
Scorecard

Australia	v	England
240 (151.1 overs); W Bruce 57; JW Sharpe 6/84 (51 overs)		264 (91.4 overs); WG Grace 50; G Bean 50; RW McLeod 5/53 (28.4 overs)
236 (191.5 overs); JJ Lyons 51; R Peel 2/25 (16.5 overs)		158 (82.2 overs); AE Stoddart 35; CTB Turner 5/51 (33.2 overs)

Australia won by 54 runs
Melbourne Cricket Ground, Melbourne
Umpires: T Flynn and J Phillips

- Australia won the toss and elected to bat.
- 3 January was taken as a rest day.
- H Donnan, RW McLeod, ST Callaway (all AUS), and G Bean (ENG) made their Test debuts.

=== Second Test ===
29 January–3 February 1892
(Timeless Test)
Scorecard

Australia	v	England
144 (94.2 overs); JJ Lyons 41; GA Lohmann 8/58 (43.2 overs)		307 (114.2 overs); R Abel 132*; G Giffen 4/88 (28.2 overs)
391 (219.4 overs); JJ Lyons 134; J Briggs 4/69 (32.4 overs)		156 (66.2 overs); AE Stoddart 69; G Giffen 6/72 (28 overs)

Australia won by 72 runs
Sydney Cricket Ground, Sydney
Umpires: T Flynn and JA Tooher

- Australia won the toss and elected to bat.
- 31 January was taken as a rest day.

=== Third Test ===
24–28 March 1892
(Timeless Test)
Scorecard

England	v	Australia
499 (173.1 overs); AE Stoddart 134; CTB Turner 3/111 (46 overs)		100 (42.5 overs); JJ Lyons 23; J Briggs 6/49 (21.5 overs)
		169 (f/o) (68 overs); W Bruce 37; J Briggs 6/87 (28 overs)

England won by an innings and 230 runs
Adelaide Oval, Adelaide
Umpires: GE Downs and WO Whitridge

- England won the toss and elected to bat.
- 27 March was taken as a rest day.
- H Philipson (ENG) made his Test debut.

== Players ==
England was captained by W. G. Grace and had Gregor MacGregor as its specialist wicket-keeper, the other players being Johnny Briggs, Bobby Peel, Andrew Stoddart, Bobby Abel, Maurice Read, George Lohmann, William Attewell, John Sharpe, George Bean and Hylton Philipson.

Australia was captained by Jack Blackham, who was also its wicket-keeper. Other players to represent Australia were Alec Bannerman, George Giffen, Jack Lyons, William Bruce, Charlie Turner, Harry Moses, Harry Trott, Bob McLeod, Harry Donnan, Sydney Callaway, Walter Giffen, Syd Gregory.

== Ceylon ==
The team used Colombo as a stopover during its long sea voyage and played a match in October 1891 on Galle Face Green against a local side that was not first-class. This was the third time that an English cricket team had visited Ceylon.
