= Australian cricket team in England in 1896 =

International cricket tour

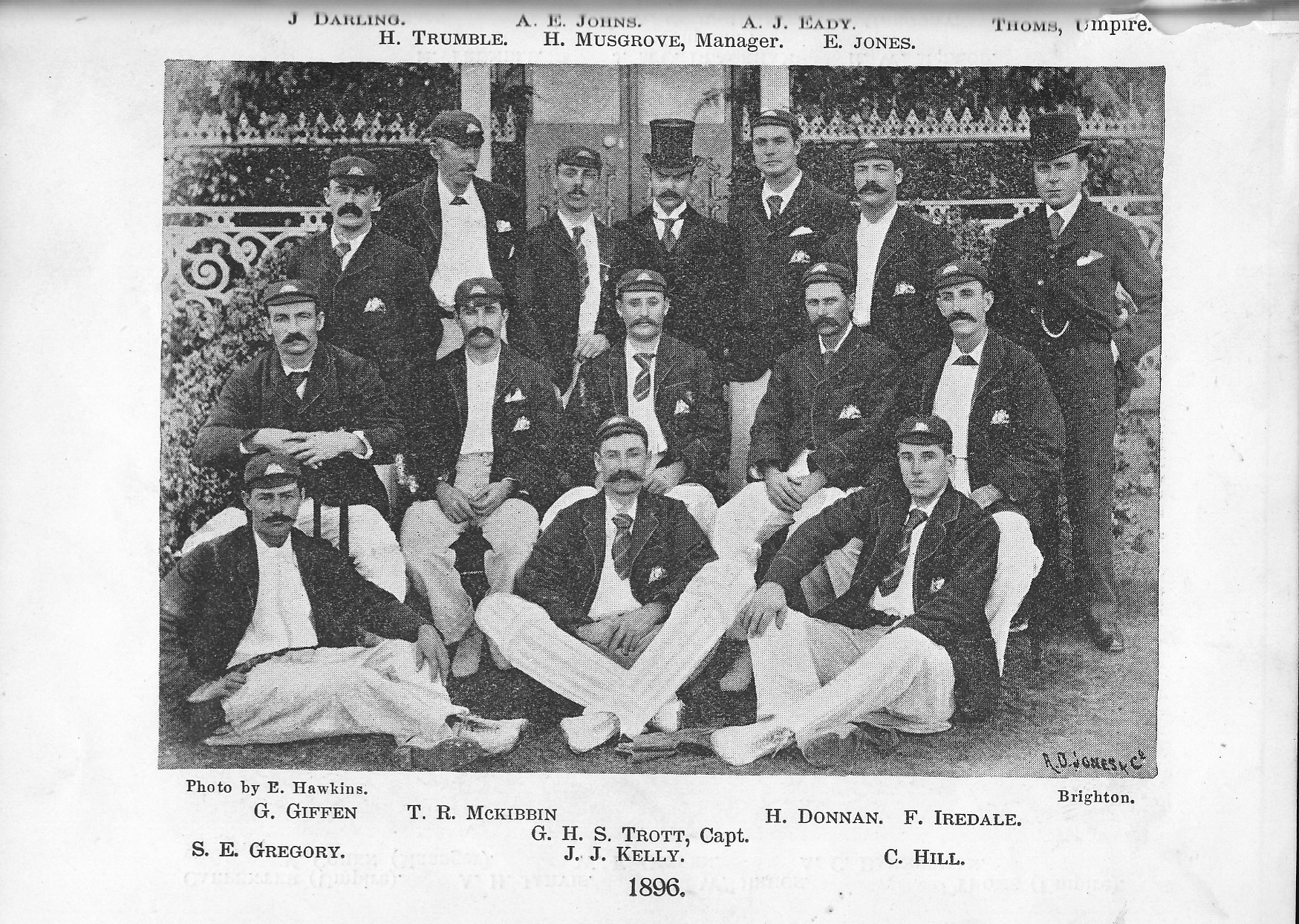
The 1896 Australian national cricket team

The Australian cricket team played 34 first-class matches in England in 1896, including 3 Tests.

== Test series ==
England won the Test series 2–1.

=== First Test ===
22–24 June 1896
Scorecard

Australia	v	England
53 (22.3 overs); J Darling 22; T Richardson 6/39 (11.3 overs)		292 (107.4 overs); R Abel 94; CJ Eady 3/58 (29 overs)
347 (133 overs); GHS Trott 143; JT Hearne 5/76 (36 overs)		111/4 (47.1 overs); JT Brown 36; E Jones 2/42 (23 overs)

England won by 6 wickets
Lord's, London
Umpires: J Phillips (AUS) and WAJ West (ENG)

- Australia won the toss and elected to bat.
- C Hill, CJ Eady, JJ Kelly (all AUS), and AFA Lilley (ENG) made their Test debuts.

=== Second Test ===
16–18 July 1896
Scorecard

Australia	v	England
412 (170 overs); FA Iredale 108; T Richardson 7/168 (68 overs)		231 (90 overs); AFA Lilley 65; TR McKibbin 3/45 (19 overs)
125/7 (84.3 overs); SE Gregory 33; T Richardson 6/76 (42.3 overs)		305 (f/o) (90.1 overs); KS Ranjitsinhji 154*; TR McKibbin 3/61 (21 overs)

Australia won by 3 wickets
Old Trafford, Manchester
Umpires: A Chester (ENG) and J Phillips (AUS)

- Australia won the toss and elected to bat.
- KS Ranjitsinhji (ENG) made his Test debut.

=== Third Test ===
10–12 August 1896
Scorecard

England	v	Australia
145 (81.3 overs); FS Jackson 45; H Trumble 6/59 (40 overs)		119 (53.1 overs); J Darling 47; JT Hearne 6/41 (26.1 overs)
84 (49 overs); R Abel 21; H Trumble 6/30 (25 overs)		44 (26 overs); TR McKibbin 16; R Peel 6/23 (12 overs)

England won by 66 runs
The Oval, London
Umpires: W Hearn (ENG) and J Phillips (AUS)

- England won the toss and elected to bat.
- EG Wynyard (ENG) made his Test debut.

== Ceylon ==
As on previous voyages to England, the Australians had a stopover in Colombo and played a match on 1 April at Galle Face Green against a Ceylon team, which was drawn.

== Annual reviews ==
- James Lillywhite's Cricketers' Annual (Red Lilly) 1897
- Wisden Cricketers' Almanack 1897
