= International cricket in 1896 =

International cricket season

The 1896 international cricket season was from April 1896 to September 1896.

== Season overview ==
International tours
Start date	Home team	Away team	Results [Matches]			
Start date	Home team	Away team	Test	ODI	FC	LA
22 June 1896	England	Australia	2–1 [3]	—	—	—
21 August 1896	Netherlands	England	—	—	1–0 [1]	—

== June ==
=== Australia in England ===
The Ashes Test match series
No.	Date	Home captain	Away captain	Venue	Result
Test No: 50	22–24 June	W. G. Grace	Harry Trott	Lord's, London	England by 6 wickets
Test No: 51	16–18 July	W. G. Grace	Harry Trott	Old Trafford Cricket Ground, Manchester	Australia by 3 wickets
Test No: 52	10–12 August	W. G. Grace	Harry Trott	Kennington Oval, London	England by 66 runs
