= Andrew Newell =

Andrew Newell may refer to:

- Andrew Newell (skier) (born 1984), Olympic skier
- Andrew Newell (athlete), Paralympic competitor from Australia
- Andrew Newell (cricketer), Australian cricketer
- Andrew Wyeth, American painter, whose name is also mentioned as Andrew Newell Wyeth, as his father's name is Newell Convers Wyeth
