= International cricket in 1897–98 =

International cricket season

The 1897–98 international cricket season was from September 1897 to April 1898. The season consisted of a single international tour where AE Stoddart's XI toured Australia for The Ashes.

== Season overview ==
International tours
Start date	Home team	Away team	Results [Matches]			
Start date	Home team	Away team	Test	ODI	FC	LA
13 December 1897	Australia	England	4–1 [5]	—	—	—

== December ==
=== England in Australia ===
The Ashes Test match series
No.	Date	Home captain	Away captain	Venue	Result
Test No: 53	13–17 December	Harry Trott	Archie MacLaren	Sydney Cricket Ground, Sydney	England by 9 wickets
Test No: 54	1–5 January	Harry Trott	Archie MacLaren	Melbourne Cricket Ground, Melbourne	Australia by an innings and 55 runs
Test No: 55	14–19 January	Harry Trott	Andrew Stoddart	Adelaide Oval, Adelaide	Australia by an innings and 13 runs
Test No: 56	29 January–2 February	Harry Trott	Andrew Stoddart	Melbourne Cricket Ground, Melbourne	Australia by 8 wickets
Test No: 57	26 February–2 March	Harry Trott	Archie MacLaren	Sydney Cricket Ground, Sydney	Australia by 6 wickets
