= Arthur Chester =

English cricketer and Test umpire

Arthur Chester was an English first-class cricketer and Test umpire. Born in 1851 in Kingston-upon-Thames, he played 17 matches for Surrey as a right-handed batsman between 1872 and 1883, scoring 272 runs with a best of 54 not out. He umpired the England v Australia test at Old Trafford in 1896. He died in Lambeth in 1915.
