= John Carlton =

Australian cricketer

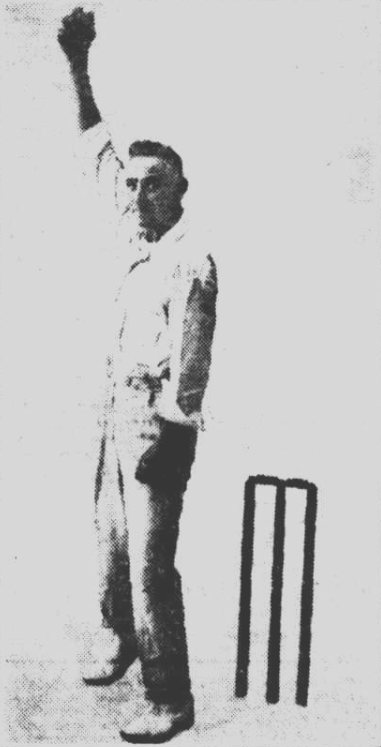

Personal information
- Born: 6 July 1866; Bacchus Marsh, Australia
- Died: 13 August 1945 (aged 79); Melbourne, Australia

Domestic team information
- Years: Team
- 1891-1897: Victoria
- Source: Cricinfo, 26 July 2015

John Carlton (6 July 1866 – 13 August 1945) was an Australian cricketer. He played 16 first-class cricket matches for Victoria between 1891 and 1897.

== See also ==
- List of Victoria first-class cricketers
