= Robert Dyer (Australian cricketer) =

Australian cricketer

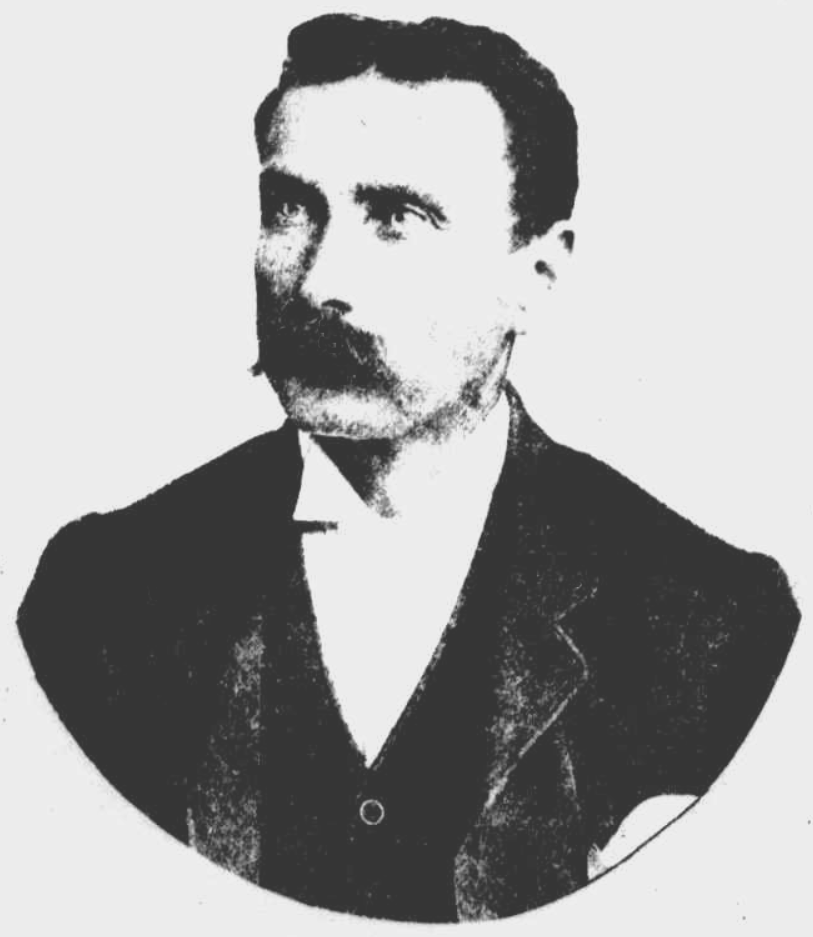

Personal information
- Born: 1860; England
- Died: 31 August 1950 (aged 89–90); Nailsworth, Australia
- Source: Cricinfo, 31 October 2018

Robert Dyer (1860 – 31 August 1950) was an Australian cricketer. He played eight first-class matches for South Australia between 1893 and 1896.

== See also ==
- List of South Australian representative cricketers
