= Albert Trott =

Australian cricketer (1873–1914)

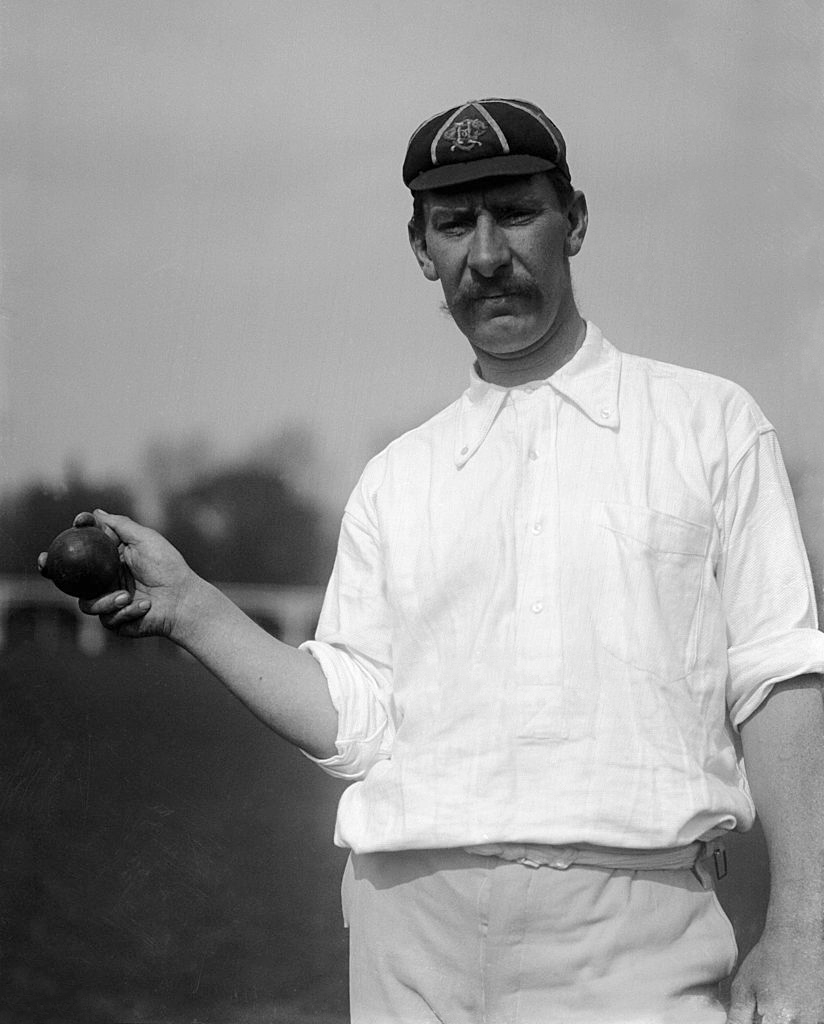

Personal information
- Full name: Albert Edwin Trott
- Born: 6 February 1873; Abbotsford, Victoria, Australia
- Died: 30 July 1914 (aged 41); Harlesden, Middlesex, England
- Nickname: Alberto, Albatrott
- Batting: Right-handed
- Bowling: Right-arm off break; Right-arm fast-medium
- Role: All-rounder
- Relatives: Harry Trott (brother)

International information
- National sides: Australia (1895); England (1899)
- Test debut (cap 71/116): 11 January 1895; Australia v England
- Last Test: 1 April 1899; England v South Africa

Domestic team information
- Years: Team
- 1892/93–1895/96: Victoria
- 1898–1910: Middlesex
- 1900–1904: London County
- 1901/02: Hawke's Bay

Career statistics
Competition	Test	First-class
Matches	5	375
Runs scored	228	10,696
Batting average	38.00	19.48
100s/50s	0/2	8/44
Top score	85*	164
Balls bowled	948	71,388
Wickets	26	1,674
Bowling average	15.00	21.09
5 wickets in innings	2	131
10 wickets in match	0	41
Best bowling	8/43	10/42
Catches/stumpings	4/–	452/–
- Source: CricketArchive, 2 December 2008

Albert Edwin Trott (6 February 1873 – 30 July 1914) was a Test cricketer for both Australia and England. He was named as one of the Wisden Cricketers of the Year in 1899. He is believed to be the only batsman to have hit a ball over the top of the Lord's Pavilion. He is also one of only two players to take two hat-tricks in the same first-class innings, the other being Joginder Rao. Despite his notability, having played in 375 first-class matches including 5 Tests, he was almost penniless when he killed himself at the age of 41.

== Birth ==
Trott was born in Abbotsford, Melbourne, Australia. He was one of eight children of accountant Adolphus Trott and his wife Mary-Ann (née Stephens). His older brother, Harry Trott also played Test cricket for Australia. They played junior cricket with the local Capulet club and then played together for Victoria in Australia's domestic first-class cricket competition, the Sheffield Shield.

== Cricket career in Australia ==
Trott's story represents one of the great enigmas of Australian cricket history. After just three first-class matches for Victoria, he burst onto the Test scene against AE Stoddart's England team in the 3rd Test at Adelaide in 1894–95, with an amazing debut which included taking 8 for 43 with his slinging, round-arm bowling and scoring 38 and 72 with the bat, both not out, batting at number 10. Australia won the match by 382 runs. He followed this up in the 4th Test in Sydney, by scoring 85 not out in Australia's only innings. Trott was not asked to bowl by captain George Giffen, with England being bowled out cheaply twice by Harry Trott, Charlie Turner and George Giffen. Australia won by an innings and 147 runs to tie the series 2–2. Trott played again in the 5th Test at Melbourne, which England won to win the Ashes, chasing down a target of 297 runs in the second innings with only four wickets down.

Albert's brother, Harry Trott, was named captain of the Australian team which toured England in 1896. Despite Albert having averaged 102.5 with the bat in the Test series against England, he was not selected for the tour. Nonetheless, Trott sailed to England independently in 1896, on the same ship as the Australian touring side.

== Cricket career in England ==
In England, Trott joined the ground staff at Lord's with a view to qualifying by residence to play for Middlesex. He started to play for the Marylebone Cricket Club (MCC) in 1896, and with the help of the Australian cricketer and Test umpire Jim Phillips, he started to play for Middlesex in 1898. Despite missing a month due to an injured hand, he took 102 wickets in his first season, forming a formidable bowling partnership with J. T. Hearne.

Between December 1898 and April 1899, Trott took part in a tour of South Africa organised by Lord Hawke. He played in two matches against the South Africa national cricket team which were retrospectively awarded Test status and thus became one of only sixteen players to have played test cricket for two countries and the last cricketer to have played for both England and Australia.

He was at the peak of his powers as an all-rounder in 1899 and 1900. In 1899 he scored 1,175 first-class runs and took 239 wickets, and in 1900 he scored at 1,337 runs and took 211 wickets. Trott's penchant for the spectacular did not fail him: having already landed the ball on the pavilion balcony at Lord's in the match, he became the only batsman to hit a ball over the current Lord's pavilion, bludgeoning Monty Noble out of the ground on 31 July 1899. The ball hit a chimney and fell into the garden outside the house of Philip Need, the Lord's dressing room attendant. At the time, Trott had been playing for the MCC and Ground against the Australians; the MCC team also included WG Grace and KS Ranjitsinhji. Noble soon had his revenge when Trott was dismissed shortly afterwards, caught off a top edge at third man. Only two months earlier, playing for Middlesex against Sussex, Trott had hit a lofted drive from Fred Tate into the ironwork at the top of one of the pavilion towers. He was a Wisden Cricketer of the Year in 1899. He took all ten wickets in an innings (10 for 42) bowling for Middlesex against Somerset at Taunton in 1900.

Completed Test career bowling averages (Note: Qualification: 10 wickets, career completed.)
Bowler	Average
Charles Marriott (ENG)	8.72
Frederick Martin (ENG)	10.07
George Lohmann (ENG)	10.75
Laurie Nash (AUS)	12.60
John Ferris (AUS/ENG)	12.70
Tom Horan (AUS)	13.00
Harry Dean (ENG)	13.90
Albert Trott (AUS/ENG)	15.00
Mike Procter (SA)	15.02
Jack Iverson (AUS)	15.23
Tom Kendall (AUS)	15.35
Alec Hurwood (AUS)	15.45
Billy Barnes (ENG)	15.54
John Trim (WI)	16.16
Billy Bates (ENG)	16.42

Trott was widely acknowledged as the finest all-round cricketer of his day. A true student of the game, Trott's bowling relied less on pace than it did on guile and spin; his variations ensured that a batsman rarely faced the same ball twice in an over. Trott was a dynamo in the field, with the ball seldom escaping his commodious clutch. He regularly turned matches for Middlesex with his powerful hitting, using a 3 pounds (1.4 kg) bat, at least half a pound heavier than was then usual.

However, from 1901 or 1902, Trott declined abruptly. His weight increased rapidly and he lost mobility, so he could not bowl the very fast ball that was so deadly in his early years. His haul of wickets fell rapidly: from 176 in 1901 to 133 in 1902 and 105 in 1903. By 1905, he was extremely expensive and ineffective (taking only 62 wickets), and only in the very dry summer of 1906 did his batting reach the levels of his early years with Middlesex.

Trott's ability to entertain never left him. His popularity rose as he enjoyed regular ales with spectators on the boundary while fielding. In his benefit match in 1907, he took four wickets in four balls, and then followed up with a second hat trick later in the innings. The feat of two hat-tricks in an innings has been repeated only once in first-class cricket, by Joginder Rao). However, the early end to the match meant that it did not raise as much money for him as it might have done, and he is said to have remarked that he had "bowled himself into the poorhouse".

== Death ==
After retiring from cricket, Trott suffered a lengthy illness. He had a heart condition complicated by nephralgia.

In 1914, he wrote his will on the back of a laundry ticket, leaving his wardrobe and £4 to his landlady. Shortly afterwards, one day before the 15th anniversary of his famous strike over the pavilion at Lord's, he shot himself in Willesden Green, Middlesex.

He was buried at Willesden New Cemetery in plot 613P at the expense of Middlesex County Cricket Club. A headstone was erected in 1994.

Speculation that the South African-born English cricketer Jonathan Trott might be a distant relation of Albert and Harry Trott appears to be ill-founded. Jonathan's family originates in Woodbridge, Suffolk, whereas Harry and Albert's family originates in Yorkshire.

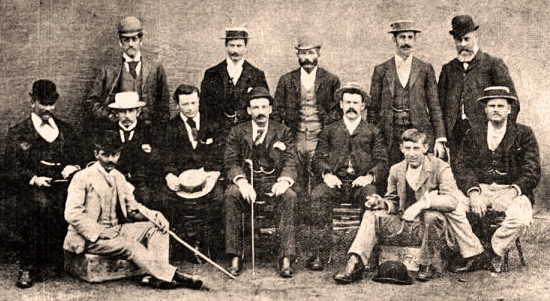
The Australian team pictured during the summer of 1894–95. Albert is seated at the front, on the right; his older brother Harry Trott is at the far left of the middle row.

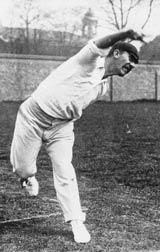
The bowling action of Albert Trott

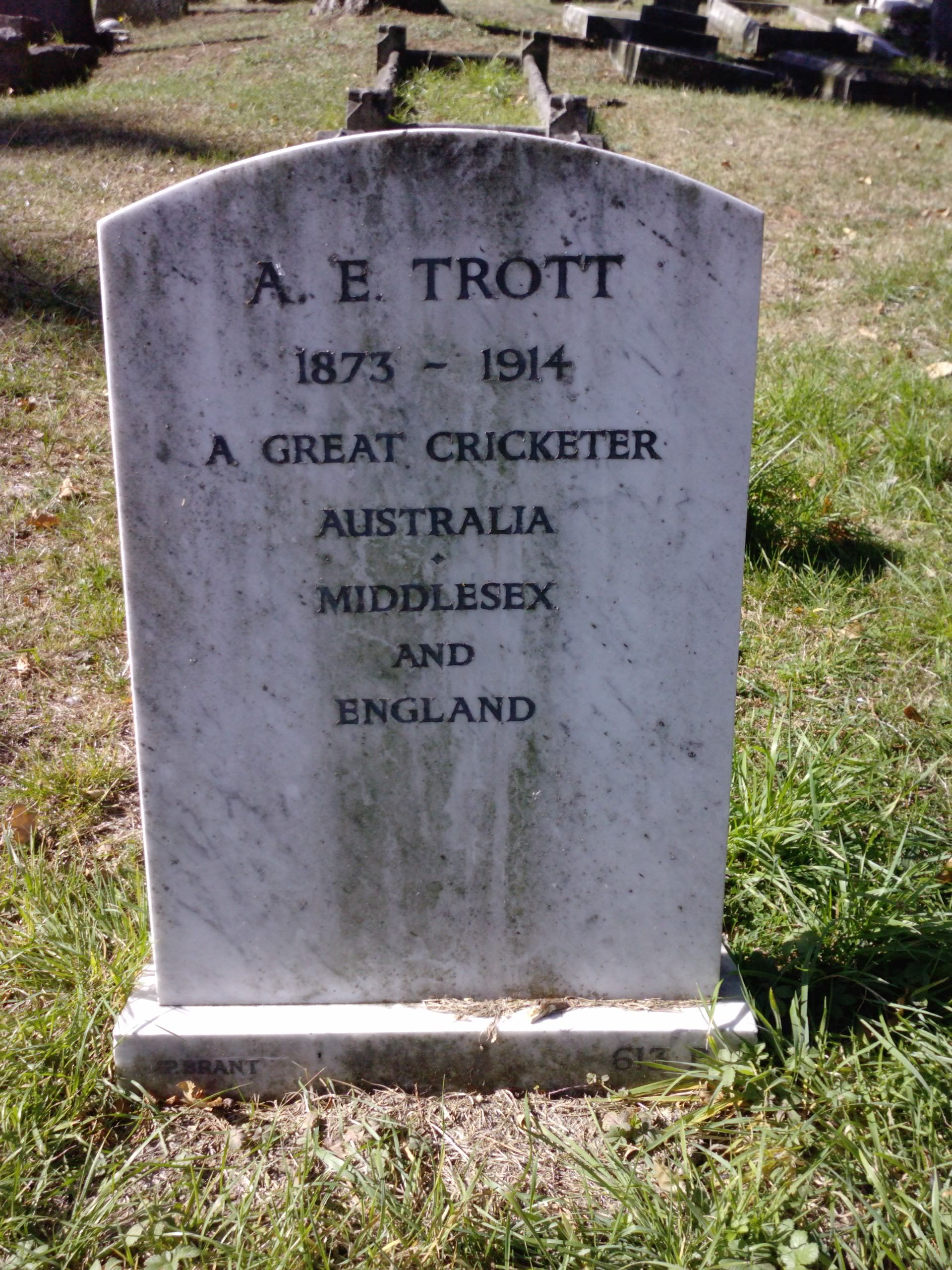
Albert Trott's headstone

== See also ==
- List of cricketers who have played for more than one international team
