= Andrew Newell (cricketer) =

Australian cricketer

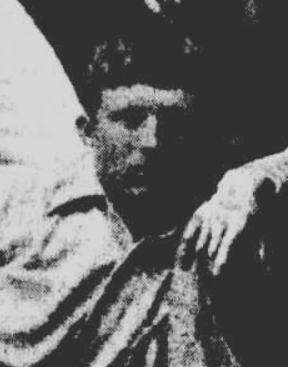

Personal information
- Full name: Andrew Livingstone Newell
- Born: 13 November 1865; Dungog, New South Wales, Australia
- Died: Details unknown
- Batting: Right-handed
- Bowling: Right-arm off-break, right-arm medium pace

Domestic team information
- Years: Team
- 1889–90 to 1899–1900: New South Wales

Career statistics
Competition	First-class
Matches	25
Runs scored	477
Batting average	15.90
100s/50s	0/2
Top score	68 not out
Balls bowled	4741
Wickets	82
Bowling average	20.34
5 wickets in innings	4
10 wickets in match	2
Best bowling	8/56
Catches/stumpings	16/0
- Source: ESPNcricinfo, 26 October 2019

Andrew Newell (born 13 November 1865, date of death unknown) was an Australian cricketer. He played twenty-five first-class matches for New South Wales between 1889/90 and 1899/1900.

Newell, a right-arm off-spin and medium-pace bowler, was the most successful bowler in Sydney grade cricket in 1892-93, when he took 60 wickets for Glebe at an average of 5.43. At the end of that season he took 6 for 25 and 4 for 27 for New South Wales in a low-scoring match against Queensland that Queensland won by 17 runs. His best innings figures for New South Wales were 8 for 56 against Victoria in 1897-98.

In November 1907 Newell was living with his wife in the Sydney suburb of Woollahra and working as a clerk in the Postal Department. He had been receiving medical treatment for a nervous condition, and had had to take a break from playing cricket, when he disappeared while walking his dogs. He was assumed to have died, but in early 1911 a friend in Sydney received a letter from him, sent from Valparaíso, Chile, where he had been living for some time under an assumed name.
