= Jack Harry =

Australian cricketer

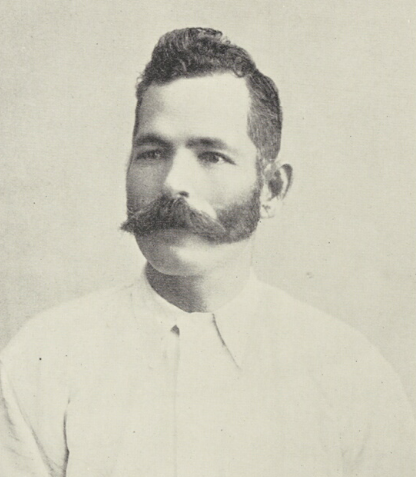

Personal information
- Full name: John Harry
- Born: 1 August 1857; Ballarat, Colony of Victoria
- Died: 27 October 1919 (aged 62); Canterbury, Melbourne, Australia
- Batting: Right-handed
- Bowling: Right-arm off-break
- Role: All-rounder, occasional wicket-keeper

International information
- National side: Australia
- Only Test (cap 70): 11 January 1895 v England

Domestic team information
- Years: Team
- 1883–84 to 1897–98: Victoria

Career statistics
Competition	Tests	First-class
Matches	1	32
Runs scored	8	1466
Batting average	4.00	25.71
100s/50s	0/0	2/9
Top score	6	114
Balls bowled	0	1422
Wickets	0	26
Bowling average	–	23.76
5 wickets in innings	0	0
10 wickets in match	0	0
Best bowling	–	4/15
Catches/stumpings	1/0	19/3
- Source: Cricinfo, 23 October 2021

John Harry (1 August 1857 – 27 October 1919) was an Australian cricketer who played in one Test match at Adelaide in 1895.

Harry was a talented batsman, bowler, fieldsman and wicket-keeper who played for the East Melbourne Cricket Club and represented Victoria from 1884 to 1897. He could throw strongly with either hand. His highest first-class score was 114 for Victoria against Western Australia in April 1893.

After top-scoring with 70 for Victoria against the touring English team in November 1894, Harry was selected to play in the Third Test in Adelaide a few weeks later. Australia won by a large margin, but he was not successful, and he never played another Test.

Harry was picked for the Australians' 1896 England tour but was replaced before the tour began, ostensibly because of a knee injury, but in fact because the rest of the team voted him out. He sued the Australasian Cricket Council, accepting an out-of-court settlement of £180.

Harry returned to Bendigo, where he had lived before his first-class cricket career, and resumed work as a miner. He contracted silicosis and died in October 1919, aged 62.

== See also ==
- List of Victoria first-class cricketers
