= Jack Tooher =

Australian cricketer and umpire (1846–1941)

John Tooher
Personal information
- Full name: John Andrew Tooher
- Born: 18 November 1846; Sydney, New South Wales
- Died: 23 May 1941 (aged 94); Neutral Bay, Sydney, New South Wales, Australia
- Source: ESPNcricinfo, 3 February 2017

John Andrew Tooher (18 November 1846 – 23 May 1941) was an Australian first-class cricketer for New South Wales and a Test cricket umpire.

Tooher was a right-handed batsman who played one match in 1875/76, batting last and scoring 0 not out in his only innings; New South Wales nevertheless beat Victoria by an innings.

Tooher umpired 13 first-class matches between 1892 and 1898. His first was the Test match between Australia and England in Sydney on 29 January to 3 February 1892, when he partnered with Tom Flynn. He witnessed Alick Bannerman scoring only 67 runs in a complete day's play, and a hat-trick to England's Johnny Briggs in a match in which Australia came from over 150 runs behind on the first innings to win by 72 runs. It was Tooher's only Test match.

In a match between Victoria and New South Wales in January 1894, Tooher delayed the start of the last day's play because he believed the pitch was too wet. When play did start, Victoria collapsed and lost the match. Their captain, Jack Blackham, blamed Tooher for the defeat, saying that he had delayed the start until the pitch was sticky and favoured the bowlers. Tooher took exception to the remarks and retired, but later accepted an apology and returned to umpiring.

Tooher worked in Sydney in the Government Printing Office. In 1912, when he celebrated 50 years working there, he was the foreman in the binding section.

Before his death aged 94 in May 1941, Tooher had been the oldest surviving New South Wales representative cricketer for several years.

== See also ==
- Australian Test Cricket Umpires
