= Tom Flynn (umpire) =

Australian cricket umpire (died 1931)

Thomas Flynn (c. 1849 – 21 April 1931) was an Australian cricket umpire who officiated four Test matches involving the Australian cricket team in the later part of the 19th century.

== Umpiring career ==
Flynn made his Test match debut in the game between Australia and England that took place in Melbourne from 1 January 1892; his umpiring colleague for the match was Jim Phillips. His last Test match, also with Phillips, was in Melbourne on 1 March 1895.

Flynn's appointment to the two Melbourne Cricket Ground Tests in the 1894–95 season proved uncontroversial. In between the two matches he was also nominated to umpire the fourth Test of the series at Sydney, alongside Phillips; the match followed the New South Wales game against Victoria, and Flynn was Victoria's regular umpire in first-class matches between 1891 and 1895. Although he had umpired the New South Wales v Victoria matches at Sydney in the four preceding seasons and had umpired a Test there in 1892, Flynn was refused permission to travel to Sydney by his employer in Melbourne, the Fitzroy Cricket Club, for whom he was the groundsman. The refusal provoked a walk-out by the players at the Fitzroy club as well as seeing editorials written in newspapers. The Sportsman wrote: "We have few enough good umpires, and ... Flynn is in the first flight... He was wanted in Sydney and should have been allowed to proceed there." Flynn did not dispute the Fitzroy club's ruling and did not travel to Sydney, but the club dismissed him anyway, which occasioned further newspaper disapproval. After standing in the Melbourne Test match, Flynn was reported to have been appointed as a groundsman at the East Melbourne Cricket Club; later in 1895, there was a report of him taking the same role at the WACA ground at Perth; but by the end of the year he had left cricket and taken up the running of a hotel in Charters Towers, Queensland, a goldmining boom town at the time.

== Later life and death ==
At the time of his death in Charters Towers, Queensland in 1931, he was reported to have been the manager of a meat works.

== See also ==
- Australian Test Cricket Umpires
- List of Test umpires
