= Tom McKibbin =

Australian cricketer (1870–1939)

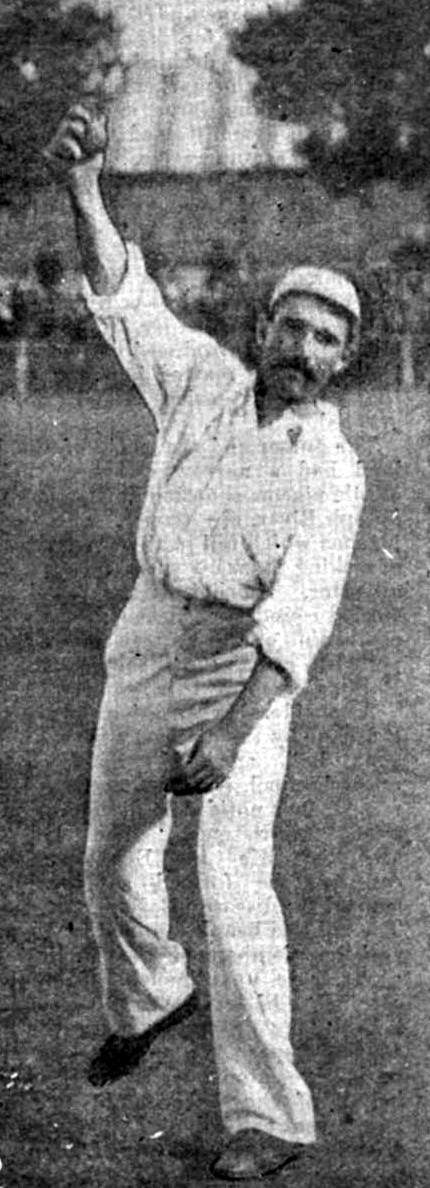
- McKibbin in about 1895

Personal information
- Full name: Thomas Robert McKibbin
- Born: 10 December 1870; Raglan, Bathurst, New South Wales
- Died: 15 December 1939 (aged 69); Bathurst, New South Wales
- Batting: Left-handed
- Bowling: Right-arm slow-medium

International information
- National side: Australia
- Test debut (cap 72): 1 March 1895 v England
- Last Test: 1 January 1898 v England

Domestic team information
- Years: Team
- 1894/95–1898/99: New South Wales

Career statistics
Competition	Test	First-class
Matches	5	57
Runs scored	88	682
Batting average	14.66	10.02
100s/50s	0/0	0/1
Top score	28*	75
Balls bowled	1,032	12,726
Wickets	17	320
Bowling average	29.17	19.67
5 wickets in innings	0	28
10 wickets in match	0	11
Best bowling	3/35	9/68
Catches/stumpings	4/–	46/–
- Source: Cricinfo, 18 November 2019

Thomas Robert McKibbin (10 December 1870 – 15 December 1939) was an Australian cricketer who played in five Test matches from 1895 to 1898.

== Early life ==
McKibbin was born in Raglan, on the outskirts of Bathurst, New South Wales. He was educated at All Saints' College, an Anglican school in Bathurst.

== Cricket career ==
McKibbin came to attention when he visited Sydney to play in the annual Country Week carnival in 1894. He was so successful that, despite being called for throwing, he was immediately included in the New South Wales team. A right-arm bowler who imparted tremendous spin to the ball and was able to bowl both off-breaks and leg-breaks, he played for New South Wales from 1894–95 to 1898–99. In his third first-class match, he took 5 for 19 and 9 for 68 against Queensland, followed by 6 for 123 and 8 for 66 in the Sheffield Shield against South Australia. He made his Test debut for Australia a few days later in the last match of the 1894–95 series against England.

McKibbin's unusually flexible wrist enabled him to achieve exceptional spin. A contemporary report noted: "Placing his arm upon a table, with the hand palm down, he can, keeping the forearm rigid, twist his hand around from the wrist until his palm faces upward." He sometimes had his action questioned, but he was never called for throwing in first-class cricket.

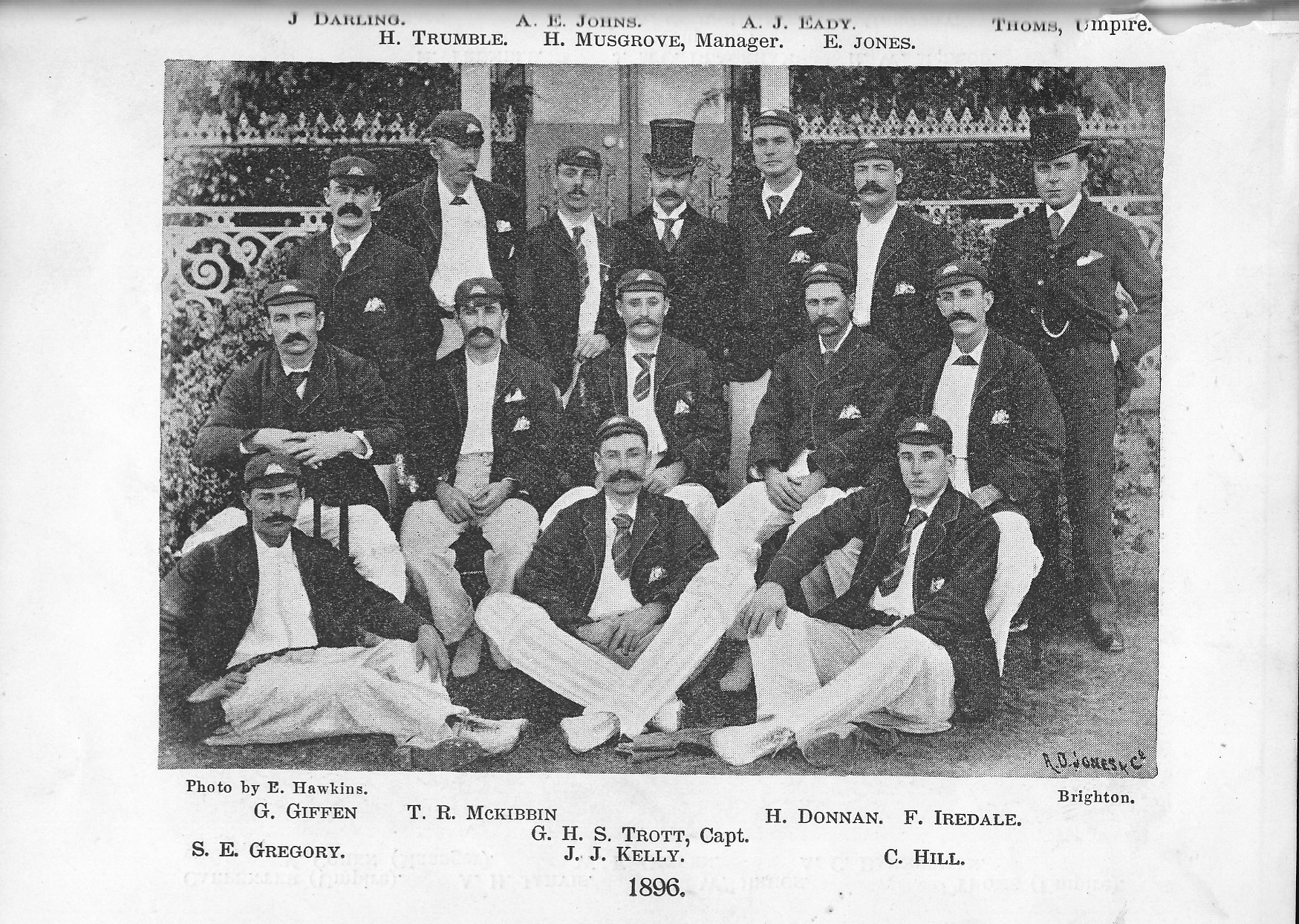
McKibbin pictured 2nd left (Middle row) with the 1896 Australia national cricket team

McKibbin took 101 first-class wickets at an average of 14.26 on the Australians' tour of England in 1896. In the match against Lancashire he took 6 for 27 and 7 for 11, including a hat-trick. After the tour, Wisden commented, "In a long experience of first-class cricket we have never seen any bowler get on such a break both ways as he did at The Oval in the first match against Surrey." He played in two of the Tests, taking 11 wickets at an average of 14.72.

In 1896-97 McKibbin set a record for the Sheffield Shield when he took 44 wickets in the season, in four matches, a record which stood until 1934–35, when Chuck Fleetwood-Smith took 60 wickets in six matches. McKibbin's figures that season included 7 for 51 and 8 for 74 against South Australia in Adelaide.

== Later life ==
After his cricketing career ended, McKibbin was employed by an engineering firm and travelled the Australian states installing shearing machines. He also spent some time prospecting for gold in Western Australia. Later he was in partnership with his brother who had pastoral interests in the Bathurst district. After suffering ill-health for nearly 10 years, McKibbin died in December 1939, leaving a widow.
