= Harry Graham (cricketer) =

Australian sportsman

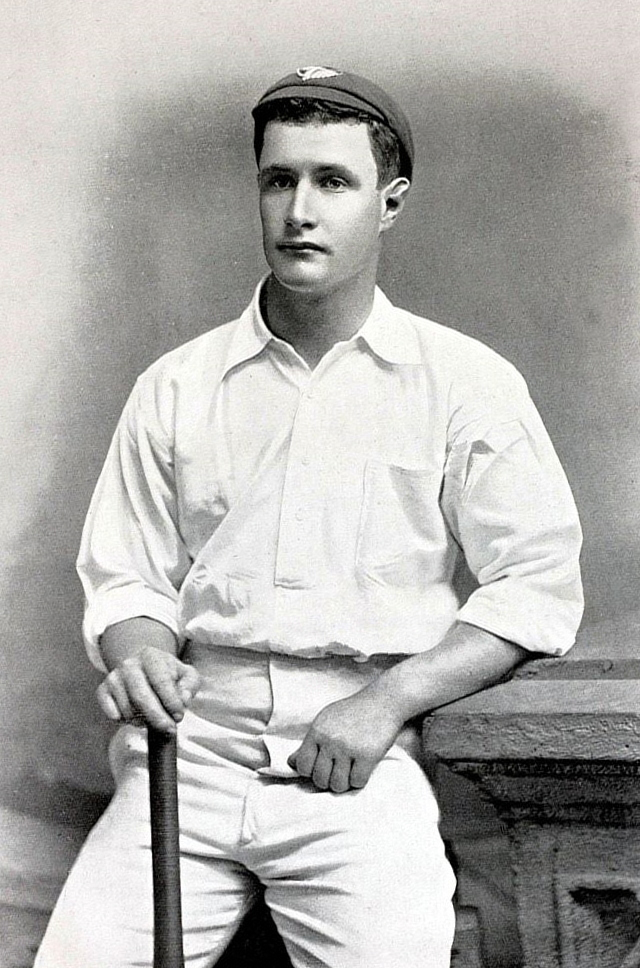

Personal information
- Full name: Henry Graham
- Born: 22 November 1870; Melbourne, Australia
- Died: 7 February 1911 (aged 40); Seacliff, New Zealand
- Batting: Right-handed
- Bowling: Legbreak

International information
- National side: Australia
- Test debut (cap 63): 17 July 1893 v England
- Last Test: 22 June 1896 v England

Domestic team information
- Years: Team
- 1892/93–1902/03: Victoria
- 1903/04–1906/07: Otago

Career statistics
Competition	Test	First-class
Matches	6	114
Runs scored	301	5,054
Batting average	30.10	26.32
100s/50s	2/0	7/24
Top score	107	124
Balls bowled	–	298
Wickets	–	6
Bowling average	–	43.00
5 wickets in innings	–	0
10 wickets in match	–	0
Best bowling	–	4/39
Catches/stumpings	3/–	85/–
- Source: CricketArchive, 19 August 2022

Harry Graham (22 November 1870 – 7 February 1911) was an Australian cricket player – a right-handed batsman, who played six Test matches for Australia, and also played cricket for New Zealand – and an Australian rules footballer who played for the Melbourne Football Club in the Victorian Football League (VFL).

== Family ==
The son of James Graham (1839–1911), and Mary Theresa Graham (1846–1886), née Lauder, he was born in Carlton on 22 November 1870.

== Cricket ==
He was taught to play cricket at Berwick Grammar School, by its owner/founder Edward Antonio Lloyd Vieusseux (1854–1917). On leaving school Graham joined the South Melbourne Cricket Club; he later moved to the Melbourne Cricket Club (1894/1895) and, finally, to the Carlton Cricket Club.

Known affectionately as "the Little Dasher", Graham scored a century on his Test debut in 1893 at Lord's, and scored 107 in his first Test on home soil, in Sydney. He was only the third player to score a century on Test debut, and the first player to score a century in the second innings on Test debut.

[Graham was] one of the most brilliant batsmen and fieldsmen Australia has ever produced. He first became famous with the bat in 1892-3, when playing for Victoria. He was included in the Australian team which visited England in 1893, and was a great success. He headed the batting averages for all matches, one of his best efforts being 107 runs against All-England at Lord's. He was a terror on fast bowling. He was a resolute batsman, a distinct characteristic being the alteration of his style to suit varying conditions of wickets. Graham was regarded as the best wet wicket batsman who ever played for Australia, whilst his equal as an outfield has rarely been seen. — The Bendigo Advertiser, 11 February 1911.

== Football ==
Recruited from the Marylebone Football Club, Graham was a leading Australian rules footballer, playing for Melbourne Football Club, firstly in the Victorian Football Association for a number of years, where he was runner-up in the goal kicking in 1892 with 42 goals.

He made a comeback in 1900, playing two games for the Melbourne First XVIII in the new Victorian Football League: the first against Essendon, on 30 June 1900 (round 9), in which he played well and scored one goal, and the second against Carlton, on 7 July 1900 (round 10), in which he scored two goals.

== New Zealand ==
After he retired from first-class cricket in Australia, in 1903 Graham accepted the post of coach at Otago Boys' High School in Dunedin. He also played several times for Otago in first-class matches from 1903–04 to 1906–07, but without reproducing the brilliance of his Australian form.

== Death ==
"In his later years Graham was gripped with alcoholism and mental illness and he was committed to an asylum near Dunedin, New Zealand in 1907 where he remained until his death". On 7 February 1911, eleven weeks past his 40th birthday, Harry Graham died in Seacliff, a small village in the Otago region of New Zealand's South Island: "Weak in health and weak in mind for some time past, [his] death was not unexpected".

Fame is death to some men. Poor Harry Graham, who died far away from the scene of his meteoric triumphs, was a case in point. When the "Little Dasher" blossomed out into an international player eighteen years ago, he was the cricket public's idol. Had anybody suggested a testimonial money would have flown in a rich stream to the treasurer. But the trips to England took him off his feet, and finally left him high and dry in neglected obscurity. Never, possibly, did a man so quickly feel the stress and strain of all-the-year cricket. Before he became king of the bat he was a champion goal-kicker. After his tours he could hardly kick a ball forty yards. Peace to his ashes. He did many a man a good turn. — Punch, 16 February 1911.
