= Sydney Callaway =

Australian cricketer (1868–1923)

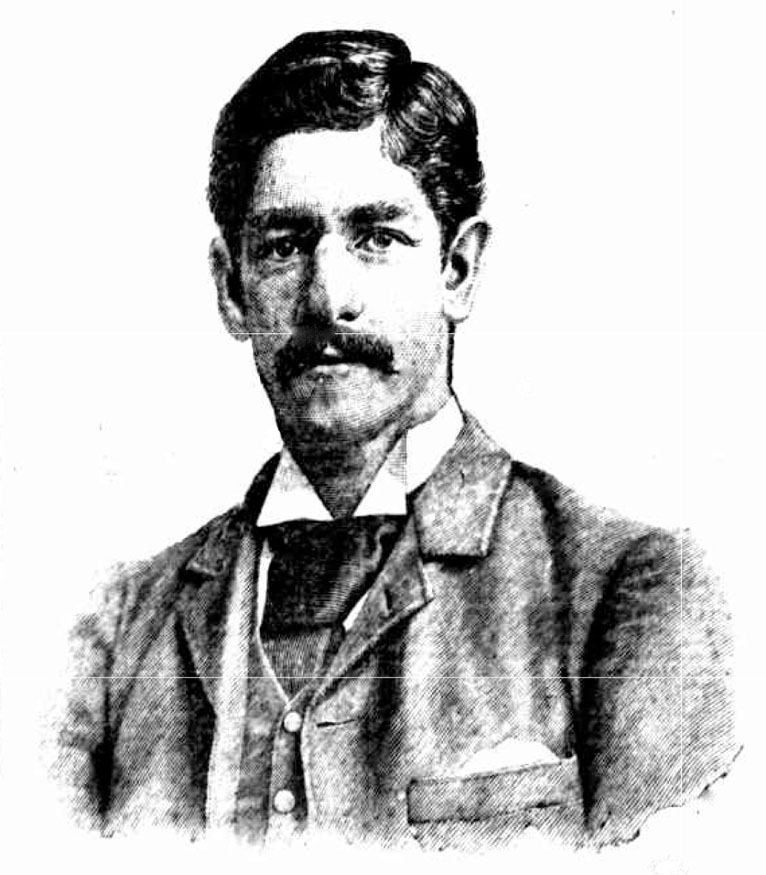
- Callaway in 1893

Personal information
- Full name: Sydney Thomas Callaway
- Born: 6 February 1868; Redfern, New South Wales
- Died: 25 November 1923 (aged 55); Christchurch, New Zealand
- Batting: Right-handed
- Bowling: Right-arm fast-medium
- Relatives: Richard Callaway (brother)

International information
- National side: Australia
- Test debut (cap 60): 1 January 1892 v England
- Last Test: 11 January 1895 v England

Domestic team information
- Years: Team
- 1888/89–1895/96: New South Wales
- 1900/01–1906/07: Canterbury

Career statistics
Competition	Test	First-class
Matches	3	62
Runs scored	87	1,747
Batting average	17.39	16.79
100s/50s	0/0	0/10
Top score	41	86
Balls bowled	471	15,906
Wickets	6	320
Bowling average	23.66	17.07
5 wickets in innings	1	33
10 wickets in match	0	12
Best bowling	5/37	8/33
Catches/stumpings	0/–	48/–
- Source: Cricinfo, 22 April 2023

Sydney Thomas Callaway (6 February 1868 – 25 November 1923) was an Australian cricketer who played in three Test matches, all of them against England in Australia in the 1890s. He was born at Redfern, New South Wales in 1868.

In 1891/92 he played in Sydney and Melbourne, and in 1894/95 he played in Adelaide where he took 5/37 in the first innings. In the Sydney Test, he was the second victim in a hat-trick by Johnny Briggs. He played in 62 first-class matches, taking 320 wickets at an average of just over 17 runs per wicket.

After he moved to New Zealand to play for Canterbury he also played several matches for New Zealand, including two against Australia, in the era before New Zealand played Test cricket. In the 1903–04 season in New Zealand he took 54 first-class wickets in five matches at an average of 8.77, with a best analysis of 8 for 33 and 7 for 27, bowling unchanged throughout, in the match against Hawke's Bay, as well as 5 for 94 and 6 for 4 against Wellington, when Wellington were dismissed for 22 in the second innings.

At the time of his death, which came in Christchurch after a long illness, he was employed as a clerk for the Canterbury Frozen Meat Company. He left a widow, Mary, and a son.
