= Harry Trott =

Australian cricketer (1866–1917)

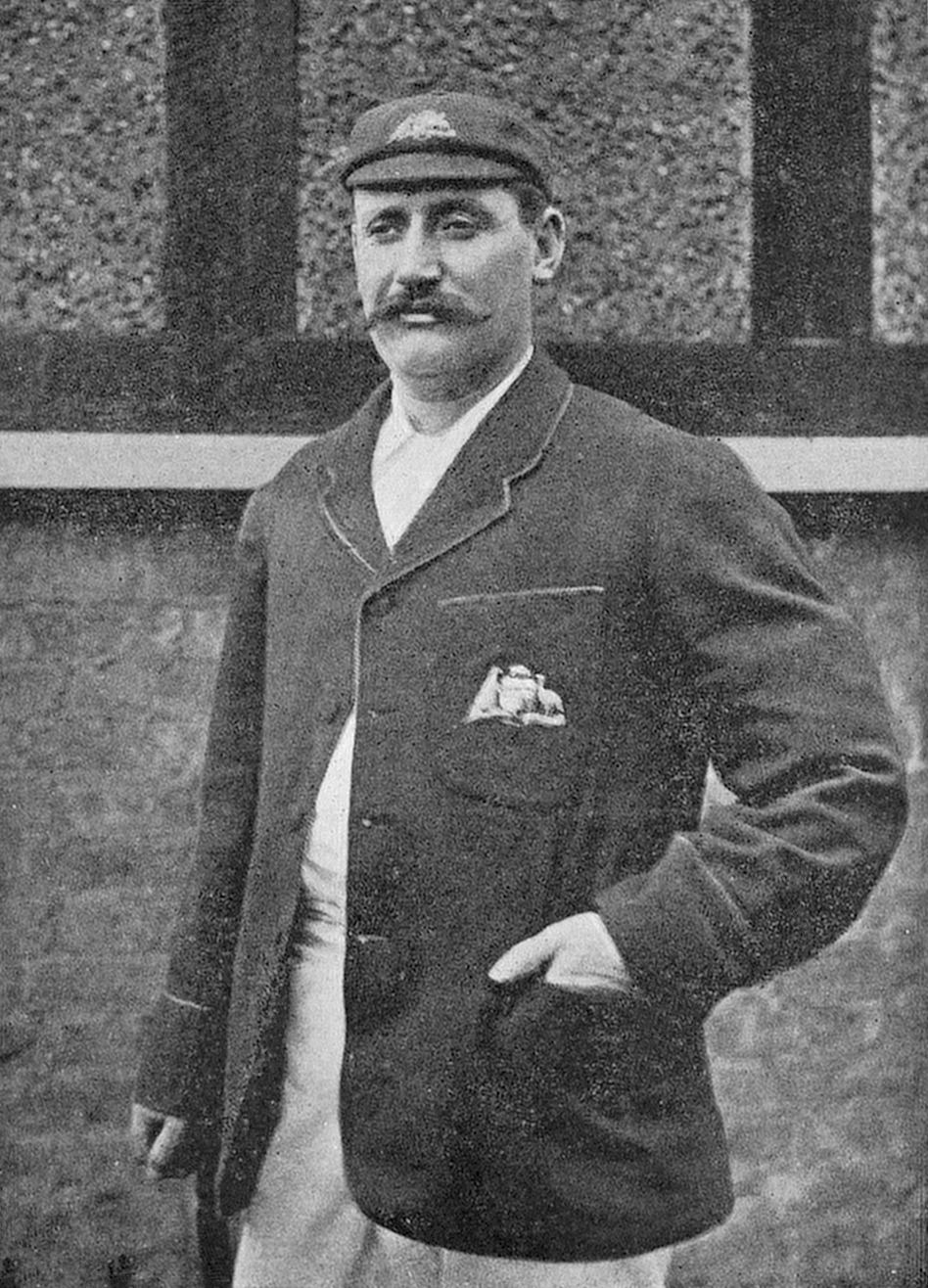

Personal information
- Full name: George Henry Stevens Trott
- Born: 5 August 1866; Collingwood, Victoria
- Died: 9 November 1917 (aged 51); Middle Park, Victoria, Australia
- Height: 1.75 m (5 ft 9 in)
- Batting: Right-handed
- Bowling: Right-arm leg spin
- Role: All-rounder

International information
- National side: Australia (1888–1898)
- Test debut (cap 53): 16 July 1888 v England
- Last Test: 26 February 1898 v England

Domestic team information
- Years: Team
- 1886–1908: Victoria

Career statistics
Competition	Test	First-class
Matches	24	222
Runs scored	921	8,804
Batting average	21.92	23.54
100s/50s	1/4	9/41
Top score	143	186
Balls bowled	1,891	18,633
Wickets	29	386
Bowling average	35.13	25.12
5 wickets in innings	0	17
10 wickets in match	0	2
Best bowling	4/71	8/63
Catches/stumpings	21/0	183/0
- Source: CricInfo, 26 February 2008

George Henry Stevens Trott (5 August 1866 – 9 November 1917) was an Australian cricketer who played 24 Test matches as an all-rounder between 1888 and 1898. Although Trott was a versatile batsman, spin bowler and outstanding fielder, "it is as a captain that he is best remembered, an understanding judge of human nature". After a period of some instability and ill discipline in Australian cricket, he was the first in a succession of assertive Australian captains that included Joe Darling, Monty Noble and Clem Hill, who restored the prestige of the Test team. Respected by teammates and opponents alike for his cricketing judgement, Trott was quick to pick up a weakness in opponents. A right-handed batsman, he was known for his sound defence and vigorous hitting. His slow leg-spin bowling was often able to deceive batsmen through subtle variations of pace and flight, but allowed opposition batsmen to score quickly.

Trott made his Test debut in 1888, on a tour of England, and would tour England another three times (in 1890, 1893 and 1896), scoring more than 1000 runs on each occasion. For the 1896 tour, Trott was elected captain by his teammates. Despite England winning the series two Tests to one and retaining The Ashes, Trott's ability as a captain was highly regarded. In the return series in Australia during the 1897–98 season, Trott's team was more successful, winning the five-Test series 4–1 and regaining The Ashes. At a time when the federation of the Australian colonies was under discussion, the victory saw Trott praised as a "national institution" and his team as having "done more for the federation of Australian hearts than all the big delegates put together".

A severe mental illness abruptly ended Trott's Test career at the age of 31. After a series of seizures in 1898, he suffered from insomnia, apathy, and memory loss. Failing to recover lucidity, he was committed to a psychiatric hospital for over a year. After he was discharged, he eventually returned to cricket, and continued to play for his state, Victoria, and club, South Melbourne, into his forties. After his retirement, Trott served as a selector for Victoria for a number of years. Outside of cricket, he worked as a postman and mail sorter. He died of cancer in 1917, aged 51.

== Early life and career ==
Born in Collingwood, an inner suburb of Melbourne, Trott was the third of eight children born to accountant Adolphus Trott and his wife Mary-Ann (née Stephens). His younger brother Albert also became a Test cricketer. The siblings played their junior cricket with the local Capulet club. Harry transferred to South Melbourne, which played in Melbourne's pennant competition, after scouts for the club noticed him playing park cricket. In his first season, the 18-year-old Trott recorded the best batting average and bowling average for the team.

Trott made his first-class debut for Victoria against an "Australian XI" on New Year's Day 1886, scoring four and 18 not out. Two months later, he played his first inter-colonial match, against South Australia at the Adelaide Oval. Batting, he scored 54 runs; his innings included a memorable hit over the leg side boundary from the bowling of leading Test all-rounder George Giffen, and he captured seven wickets for the match with his bowling. In 1886–87, Trott hit a double century for South Melbourne in a match against St Kilda and appeared for Victoria against Alfred Shaw's touring English team, claiming four wickets for 125 runs (4/125). During the next summer, he played for a non-representative "Australian XI" against Arthur Shrewsbury's XI and George Vernon's XI, two English teams touring Australia simultaneously. His chances for inclusion in the Australian squad for the forthcoming tour of England were enhanced when a number of leading players made themselves unavailable. However, Trott's batting credentials were modest: he had scored only one half-century in 29 first-class innings. At this point, Trott had enjoyed more success with his bowling. Prior to the Australian team departing for England, a change to the leg before wicket (LBW) law that would aid bowlers of Trott's style seemed imminent. The former Australian player Tom Horan wrote: "There is no bowler in England who has such a fast leg-break, and on a fine, firm pitch many a batsman has saved his wicket by his legs or body in opposing Trott's deliveries."

== Test cricket ==
=== First tours of England ===
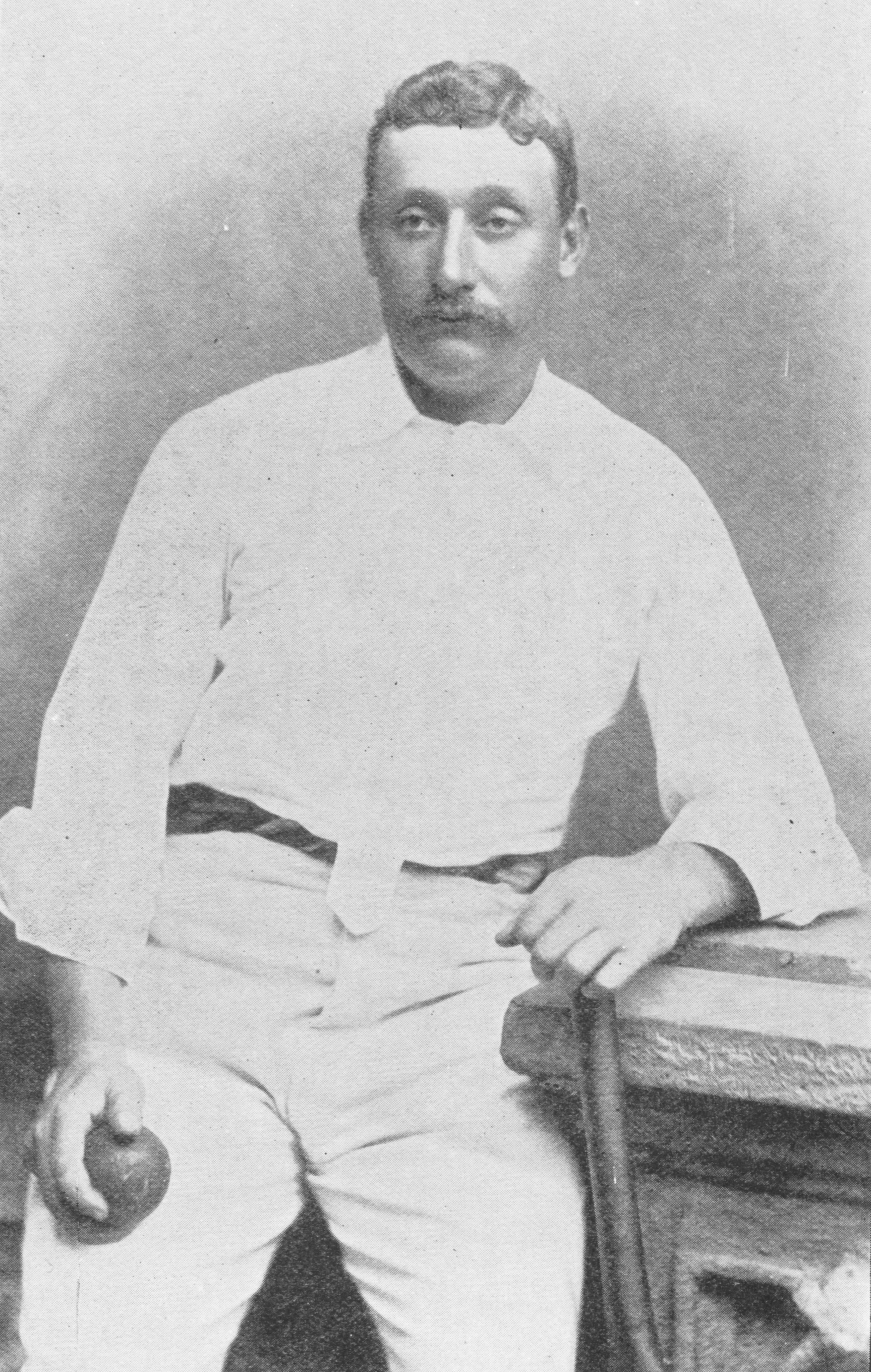
Studio portrait of cricketer Harry Trott

Included in the Australian squad to tour England in 1888, Trott was selected in the team for the First Test at Lord's. He had an inauspicious Test debut: he made a duck in the first innings and three runs in the second, and did not bowl. The Australians won the game by 62 runs, only their second Test match victory in England. However, England retained The Ashes by winning the remaining two Tests and Trott's influence on the series was negligible: he did not pass 20 in an innings, and he failed to take a wicket. Nevertheless, his performances in the other matches of the season prompted Wisden Cricketers' Almanack to write that he, "... fully justif[ied] his selection by scoring the highly creditable total of 1,212 runs, with an average of over 19 per innings", and that his fielding was "excellent at point". Wisden was less complimentary about his bowling: "We have no great opinion of Trott's leg break bowling, and think it probably too slow to be effectual against good batsmen." Trott's opportunities were limited as his teammates Charles Turner and John Ferris, "monopolised the bowling".

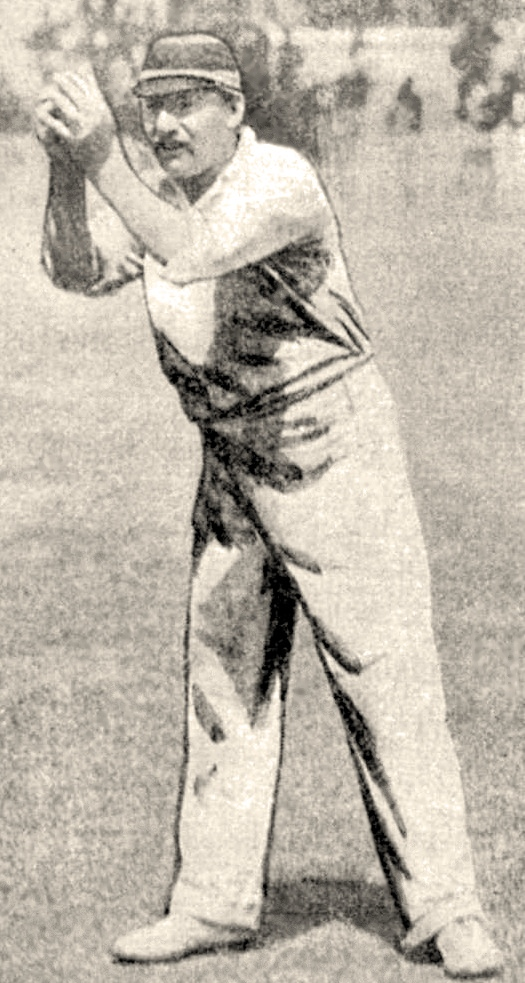
Trott was an outstanding fielder, usually at point

On his return to Australia, Trott's batting continued to improve. He scored 172 runs for an Australian XI against New South Wales, his maiden century in first-class cricket. The Sydney Morning Herald wrote that the innings "... stamped him as a batsman of the highest class". In first-class matches, Trott posted 507 runs (at 39.00 average) and claimed 25 wickets (at 17.44 average) for the summer, and hit a double century in a club match against Melbourne. Another good all-round season in 1889–90 ensured his place for the next trip to England.

The 1890 Australian team touring England was relatively inexperienced. The team missed the all-round ability of George Giffen who had refused to tour, thinking it unlikely the tour would be a sporting or financial success. The Australians won 13 matches on tour, losing 16 and drawing 9. Trott scored 1,211 first-class runs (at 20.87 average) with a highest score of 186 against Cambridge University Past and Present, and captured 20 wickets. Disappointed by Trott's performances, Wisden felt that he "... barely maintained the reputation he had so honestly gained during the tour of 1888 ... it cannot be said that he came up to expectations".

=== Australian revival and Wisden Cricketer of the Year ===
In 1891–92, Lord Sheffield's team (captained by W. G. Grace) toured Australia, the first English side to do so in four years. The presence of Grace contributed to a revival of interest in the game that had waned due to a surfeit of international tours and indifferent performances by the Australian team. The Australians won the series 2–1 to regain The Ashes. In the first Test at Melbourne, Trott scored three and 23, but had greater impact with the ball. Requiring 213 runs for victory, England's score reached 60 before their first two batsmen were dismissed. The Australian captain Jack Blackham then gambled by calling on Trott's often inaccurate bowling. Trott took two quick wickets and the English innings never recovered. In returning 3/52 for the innings, Wisden noted that Trott "bowled admirably". The remaining two Tests were less productive for Trott: he finished with 48 runs (at an average of 8.00) and 6 wickets (at an average of 35.00) for the series.

A reorganisation of Australian cricket took place in the wake of the tour. The first national body to control the game, the Australasian Cricket Council (ACC), was formed to co-ordinate the Australian Test team. Previously, private entrepreneurs and the players themselves organised international cricket. Lord Sheffield donated money to the ACC, which was used to purchase a trophy for the champion domestic team. Trott appeared in Victoria's inaugural Sheffield Shield match, against New South Wales in December 1892. He scored 63 and 70 not out in a winning effort. The ACC appointed Trott as one of the six players to select the touring team for England.

The Australian team toured England in 1893 to compete for The Ashes. The English won the series one Test to nil, with two drawn to recover The Ashes. Playing in all three Tests, Trott scored 146 runs in the series at an average of 29.20 and in all first-class matches he scored 1269 runs. While Trott did not take a wicket in the Tests, he took 38 wickets in all first-class matches that season. In the Second Test at the Oval, Trott scored 92 runs in the second innings after the Australians were forced to follow-on; an innings described as "really superb cricket" and "the finest exhibition he has ever given in England". England, regardless, still won the match by an innings. Trott was named as a Wisden Cricketer of the Year. Wisden noted that Trott "batted uncommonly well — much better than in 1890" but that when bowling he "did a good many brilliant things against the weaker teams, but he was nearly always expensive and very rarely successful when opposed to batsmen of high class".

=== The Trott brothers ===
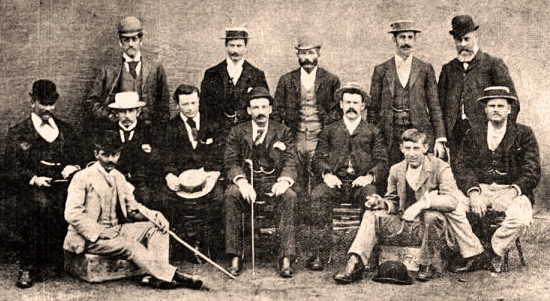
The Australian team pictured during the summer of 1894–95. Harry Trott is at the far left of the middle row, and his younger brother Albert is seated at front, on the right.

Andrew Stoddart led an English team to Australia in 1894–95 to defend The Ashes. A feature of the summer was the emergence of Albert Trott and the performance of the brothers in tandem. Playing for Victoria against the touring side, the Trotts claimed twelve wickets and held eight catches between them; Harry scored 63 in the second innings. During the second innings of the traditional Christmas fixture against New South Wales, Albert claimed five wickets, took three catches (two from Harry's bowling) and made a run out. In between these two games, England won the first Test at Sydney—a remarkable turnaround after they had been forced to follow-on—by bowling the Australians out for 166 in the second innings. The second Test at Melbourne saw another English victory; Trott played a rearguard innings of 95 in the second innings, to no avail. Attempting to stay in the series, Australia dramatically revamped their team for the next Test at Adelaide. Albert Trott, making his Test debut, was one of four inclusions while Harry was elevated to open the batting. In a match played in intense heat throughout, Harry Trott made 48 on the opening day before he was run out. Albert was the dominant player of the match with innings of 38 not out and 72 not out (both scored from the number ten position), and a bowling return of 8/43 in England's second innings. Australia won the match by 382 runs. In a Sheffield Shield match that followed, the Trotts extricated Victoria from a difficult situation. Chasing 155 to win, New South Wales fell for 99 with Albert taking four wickets and Harry five. In the fourth Test at Sydney, Australia batted first and scored 284 runs (Albert Trott 85 not out) before England were bowled out for 65 and 72 on a wicket affected by heavy rain. Opening the bowling in the first innings, Harry Trott dismissed Archie MacLaren, Johnny Briggs and Stoddart.

The fluctuating fortunes of the Test series created immense interest in the deciding Test at Melbourne. Spectators arrived from all over the country, with special trains laid on from Adelaide and Sydney. Harry Trott's all-round contribution was a score of 42 in each innings, six wickets and two catches, but England won The Ashes by chasing a target of 297 runs in the second innings, which they reached with six wickets in hand. Even in England, "the interest was greater than had ever been felt in matches played away from [England]".

During the following summer, Trott again acted as a Test selector, along with the incumbent Test captain George Giffen and former captain Percy McDonnell. When choosing the Australian team for the previous tour of England, Giffen used his influence to ensure the selection of his younger brother, Walter. The team chosen for the 1896 tour of England included a number of promising young players, including Joe Darling and Clem Hill, both of whom went on to captain Australia. Albert Trott was a controversial omission, in light of performances in the previous Ashes series, but he accompanied the team on their voyage and later settled in England. He had a successful career with Middlesex and appeared for England in two Test matches against South Africa. The cricket historian David Frith records that when the Trott brothers encountered each other on an English street, they merely exchanged acknowledging nods and kept walking.

=== Captain of Australia ===
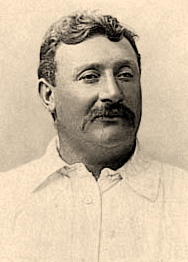
Trott

While the team was en route to England, the players elected Trott as captain ahead of George Giffen. On the opening day of the first Test at Lord's, England bowled Australia out in 75 minutes for only 53 runs on a pitch thought to be good for batting. In reply, England made 292 with Trott taking two wickets. In their second innings, Australia was still 177 runs in arrears with three wickets down when Syd Gregory joined Trott at the crease. Their partnership of 221 runs led Wisden to record that, "as long as cricket is played ... cause the match to be remembered". Trott's score of 143 (the only Test century of his career) was not enough to prevent England winning by six wickets. In the second Test at Manchester, Australia again batted first, scoring 412 runs; Frank Iredale making 108 and Trott 53. At the beginning of England's first innings, Trott opened the bowling with his flighted leg-spin. It was unusual for a leg-spinner to take the new ball, but the move—a "stroke of genius" according to Wisden—was successful as he dismissed Stoddart and W. G. Grace for low scores. Both batsmen were deceived by Trott's flight and stumped by the wicket-keeper. England totaled 231 and, forced to follow on, scored 305 runs in the second innings, K. S. Ranjitsinhji making 154 not out. In a tense finish, Australia made the 125 runs needed for victory with three wickets in hand. On a pitch affected by rain, England won the series and The Ashes, defeating Australia in the Third Test by 66 runs; Australia were bowled out for 44 runs in the second innings, at one stage having lost nine wickets for 25.

Trott made 1297 runs and took 44 wickets in first-class matches on the tour. Of his batting Wisden said "Trott's average is a little disappointing, but when a special effort was required he was not often at fault." and he bowled "on a good many occasions with fair results". However it was as a captain that Trott earned most plaudits. Wisden rated Trott as "with the exception of [Billy Murdoch], ... incomparably the best captain the Australians had ever had in this country".

He was by no means anxious for the post, but almost from the first match it was perfectly clear that he was in every way fitted for it. Of course the continuous success of his side made his duties far more pleasant and easy than those of some previous captains, but we feel quite sure that in a season of ill-fortune he would have earned just as great a reputation. Blessed with a temper that nothing could ruffle, he was always master both of himself and his team whatever the position of the game. More than that his judgement in changing the bowling was rarely or never at fault.

— Wisden Cricketers' Almanack,

Although the team was considered successful, in spite of the failure to recapture The Ashes, the problems between the players and the administrators continued. Before the team departed Australia, the players arbitrarily replaced one of the selected players without recourse to the ACC. After the final match in England, Trott and his players broke an agreement to return home in time for the 1896–97 Australian season. Instead, they organised matches in North America and New Zealand.

=== "A national institution" ===
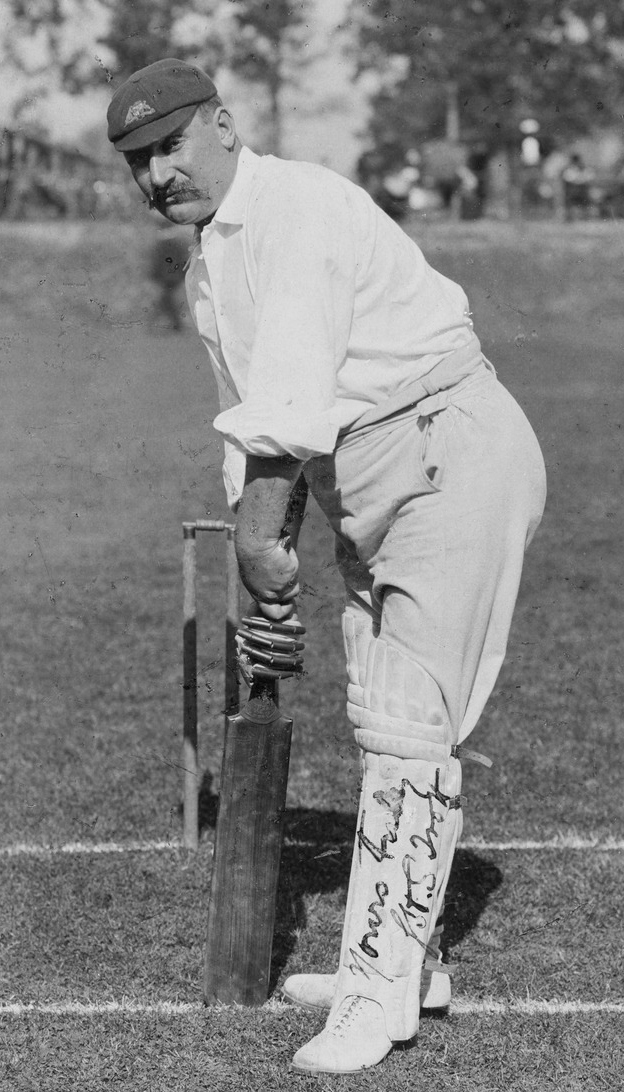
Fond of hats, Trott was seldom seen without one.

Trott retained the captaincy when Andrew Stoddart returned to Australia with his English team in 1897–98. Stoddart's team got away to a good start when they won the First Test in Sydney by nine wickets, K. S. Ranjitsinhji scoring 175 runs. With Joe Darling, Trott devised a plan to curb Ranjitsinhji's run scoring. An exponent of the leg glance, "Ranji" would take a last look at the field before he took guard. Taking advantage of this fact, after he took strike, the Australians deliberately weakened the off side with two men placed about 10 m (33 ft) away from him. Bowling a leg side line, the Australians aimed for a catch from a shot played to that side. Darling said of the plan, "As soon as he had his last look and the bowler was at the point of delivering the ball, we shifted positions by a few yards, sometimes one way, sometimes the other. Occasionally, only one would move and sometimes none would move. [...] This eventually put him clean off his game." The English captain Archie MacLaren agreed saying, "Ranji is in a blue funk". Regardless of the tactics, Ranji made 457 runs at an average of 50.77 for the Test series.

Australia fought back to win the Second Test in Melbourne by an innings and 55 runs with Trott scoring 79 runs. The Third and Fourth Tests were both won by Australia as they retrieved The Ashes. The Fifth and final Test in Sydney would be Trott's last. In the Sydney heat, Australia won the Test by 6 wickets but Trott had an attack of sunstroke. This caused him to lose the sight in one eye before his last Test innings, where he made 18 runs. In a review of the Test series Wisden noted that "the Australians owed much to the unfailing skill and tact of Trott as a captain".

During the course of the Test series, a major convention was in progress to discuss the proposed federation of the Australian colonies. However, the victory over England dominated the attention of the Australian public and some newspapers decried the focus on cricket when important matters were being discussed. Another editor remarked in defence of the public, "We believe that Harry Trott and his ten good men and true have done more for the federation of Australian hearts than all the big delegates put together." In reply to complaints about leave granted to Trott to play cricket, his proud employers at the Post office responded "Harry Trott is a national institution." Passers-by, including men and their families, would stop and look at Trott's home in Albert Park "with the deference of worshippers at a shrine", in the words of cricket writer Ray Robinson.

The impetus for federation did not extend to the administration of cricket, however. The ACC continued to attract criticism for being ineffectual and at a meeting of the Victorian Cricket Association in July 1898, Trott (in his capacity as a delegate for the South Melbourne club) tabled a motion that Victoria secede from the ACC. Although the proposal was defeated by a single vote, Trott was one of twelve Test players who signed a letter to the ACC secretary calling for the disbanding of the organisation. Failing to win the support of the players, the ACC folded in January 1900 following the withdrawal of the New South Wales Cricket Association.

== Illness and recovery ==
Less than six months after leading his team to victory over England, Trott endured a severe mental illness. While visiting his mother on 8 August 1898, Trott collapsed and lost consciousness. Later, on the train home with his wife, he had another convulsive fit and yet another at 10 pm that evening, in the presence of a doctor. Trott passed in and out of consciousness over the next four weeks, unable to work or even communicate. His supporters raised £453 to send him for two weeks at a private retreat at Woodend, a small town north-west of Melbourne. The treatment was unsuccessful and Trott continued to suffer from insomnia, memory loss and apathy.

=== Hospitalisation ===
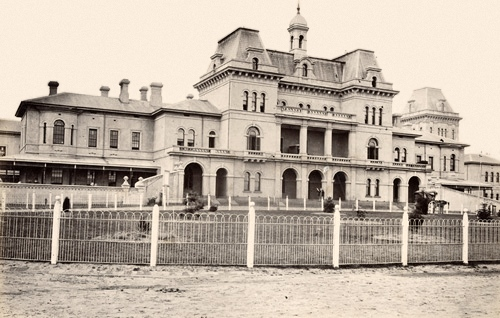
Kew Asylum, circa 1885–1887—around ten years before Trott's commitment

Because Trott's illness precluded his selection for the 1899 Australian team to England, the Australian captaincy passed to Joe Darling. On 8 May 1899, Trott was committed to the Kew Asylum, a psychiatric hospital in the eastern suburbs of Melbourne. The facility opened in 1871 during an era when large asylums were in vogue. By the time of Trott's admission, expert opinion had changed; in January 1898 The Argus reported a specialist's claim that the asylum was likely to make a patient, "just mad enough to be put under restraint"—that is, worse rather than better. Trott was recorded as suffering "dementia" and "alcoholism", although there is little empirical evidence for either diagnosis. Cricket writer Gideon Haigh suggests that his symptoms would possibly be identified in modern times as depressive psychosis and treated with antipsychotics or electroconvulsive therapy.

Doctors observed that Trott continually stood in one place, showing little interest in events around him. A doctor noted on Trott's file: "Refuses to converse not appearing to be able to follow what is said to him. Answers questions in monosyllables. Does not rouse up when subjects are spoken of that formerly he was interested in." Attempting to reach him, doctors sent Trott to play cricket, which he did in a "mechanical, indifferent fashion". In a departure from normal hospital procedure, he was allowed newspapers reporting the details of Darling's Australian side in England; this left him unmoved. Trott's friend Ben Wardill, the secretary of the Melbourne Cricket Club, visited in November 1899 but Trott did not recognise him. A fellow patient, when released, wrote of Trott: "Here is a well-known cricketer, whom we once treated as a hero. But alas! Like everything else, times have changed and he is almost forgotten."

=== Return to cricket ===
In February 1900, Trott played in a cricket match for the asylum team against the North Melbourne Rovers club. To the astonishment of his treating doctors and his teammates, he scored 98 runs in 40 minutes, including 20 fours and a six. While the doctors remained cautious about his chances of recovery, Trott played in further matches against other visiting teams and in April 1900, he took a hat-trick against a team from the Commercial Travellers Association. Declared to be "recovered", Trott was discharged after spending 400 days at Kew Asylum. He returned to the South Melbourne team and captained Victoria against Tasmania at Launceston (taking eight wickets) during the 1900–01 season, but otherwise failed to recapture the form that made him captain of his country.

To aid his convalescence, the Postmaster-General's Department—Trott's employer—transferred him to the post office at Bendigo in central Victoria. In 1902–03, he turned up uninvited to a Bendigo United Cricket Club practice session and asked to join in. He played five first-class matches during 1903–04, scoring 268 runs at an average of 26.80 and taking 13 wickets at 23.53 runs each. In his final appearance of the season, he led Victoria against Plum Warner's touring English team. He captained the Carlton club for two seasons, before spending two seasons with Fitzroy. During the 1907–08 season, he led XVIII of Bendigo against the touring English team and made a farewell first-class appearance against the tourists for Victoria. Opening the bowling, Trott returned 5/116, including the wickets of England's leading batsmen Jack Hobbs and George Gunn. Trott later returned to South Melbourne, where he played until the age of 44. He led the club on a tour of New Zealand in 1912–13 and in the next season (his last) he topped the club's batting and bowling averages, for the fifth time as a batsman and the third time as a bowler.

== Personal life ==
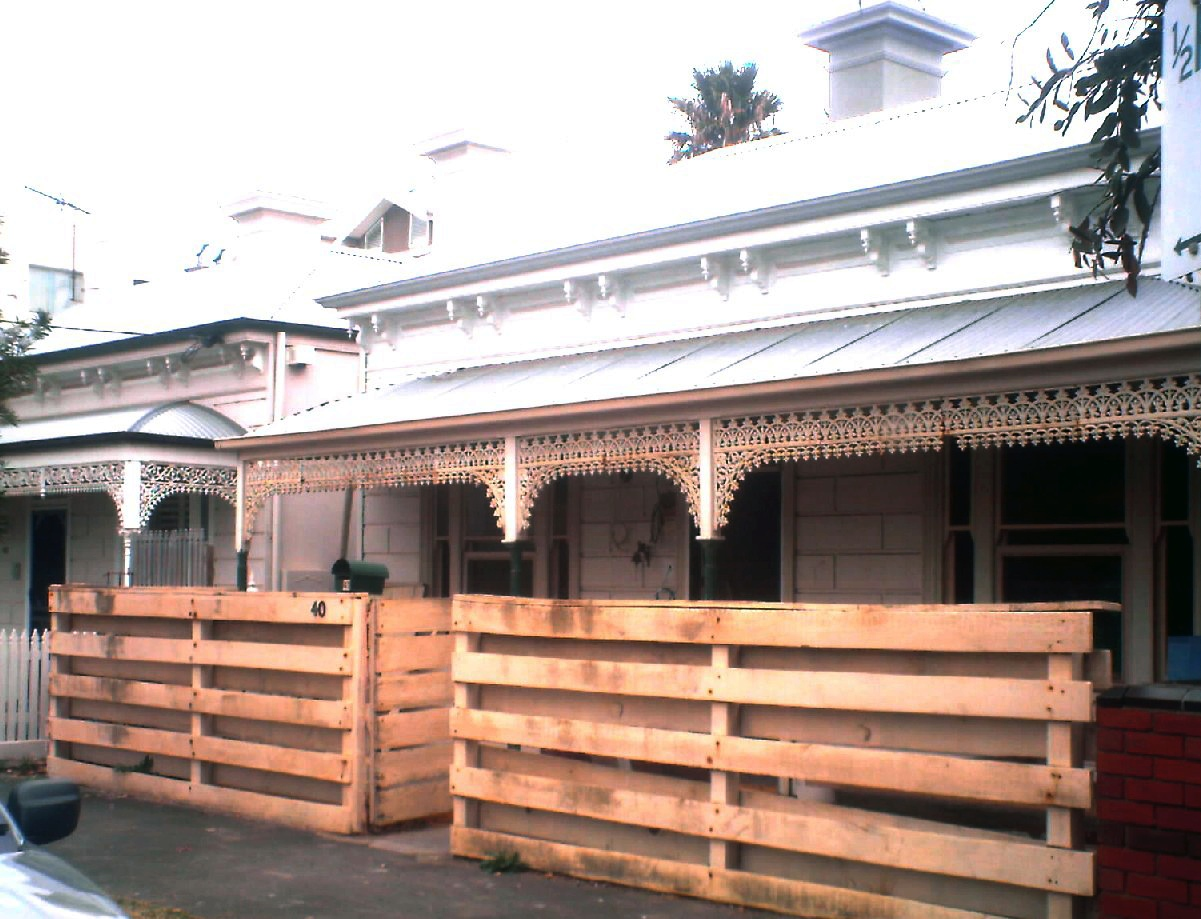
Recent photo of Trott's house, where passers-by stopped to look "with the deference of worshippers at a shrine"

Trott spent his entire working life in the Post Office, employed as a postman and mail sorter. He married Violet Hodson in Fitzroy on 17 February 1890 and the couple had one son. In 1911, Trott became a selector for the Victorian team when Hugh Trumble resigned to take the secretaryship of the Melbourne Cricket Club. Trott's high standing in the cricket community saw the other candidate for the position withdraw rather than oppose him. In 1912, Trott took the side of the "Big Six", the Australian cricketers opposed to the newly formed Australian Board of Control for International Cricket's attempt to wrest control of touring Australian sides from the players. At an "indignation meeting" at the Athenaeum Hall on Collins Street in Melbourne, the Argus reported Trott as saying that "to say he was disgusted with the Board of Control was to put it mildly" and that "[h]e would like to shake hands with the six men who had stood out against the Board".

At the age of 51, Trott died of Hodgkin's lymphoma, at his home in inner-suburban Albert Park on 9 November 1917. He was buried at Brighton Cemetery where, two years later, a large monument was erected over his grave, paid for by the Victorian Cricket Association and cricket enthusiasts. His great-grandson, Stuart Trott, played 200 games for St Kilda and Hawthorn in the Victorian Football League between 1967 and 1977. The South African-born English cricketer Jonathan Trott is said to be a distant relation of Harry and Albert Trott. However, it has now been proved that this is incorrect. Jonathan’s family originates in Woodbridge, Suffolk, whereas Harry and Albert’s family originates in Yorkshire.

Trott's role in Australian cricket was recognised by the clubs for which he had played. Until 2005, Trott's club team, South Melbourne Cricket Club was based at Harry Trott Oval in Albert Park, while Bendigo United Cricket Club, for whom Trott played in 1902, still play at the Harry Trott Oval in the Bendigo suburb of Kennington.

== Context ==
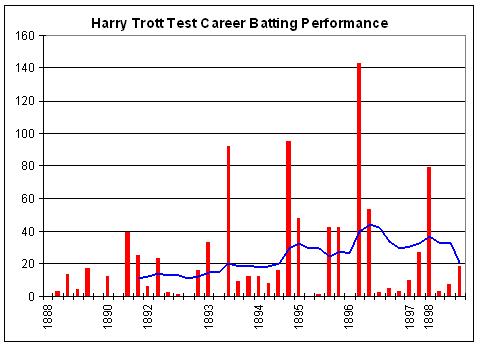
An innings-by-innings breakdown of Trott's Test match batting career, showing runs scored (red bars) and the average of the last 10 innings (blue line).

=== Playing style ===
The authoritative cricket journal Wisden Cricketers' Almanack, in an obituary, wrote "Australia has produced greater cricketers than Harry Trott, but in his day he held a place in the front rank of the world's famous players. He was a first-rate bat, a fine field at point, and his leg breaks made him a very effective change bowler." As a batsman, Trott scored his runs mostly in front the wicket. He often lifted his on-drives and was an exponent of the late cut. George Giffen said of Trott, "On a good wicket, I have seen Harry Trott adopt forcing tactics worthy of the big hitter, and in the very next match play keeps on a difficult pitch with wonderful skill." Wisden Cricketers' Almanack described Trott as "one of the soundest [Australian batsman], combining as he does vigorous hitting with a strong, watchful defence".

Trott was able to obtain turn from all types of pitches bowling his loopy leg spinners, through varying his pace and flight. He was noted for giving young batsmen a full toss on the leg side, allowing the batsman to hit it to the boundary. The next ball would seem identical, but for a subtle change in the position of a fielder, resulting in a catch and the comment, "That first ball was to give you confidence, son. The second to teach you a lesson." Warwick Armstrong, a childhood admirer and later teammate of Trott, said "Trott had an almost uncanny knowledge of batsman who were likely to succumb to his wiles and after he had met with a success, he would at once take himself off and put on some other bowler of a different type." Wisden thought his bowling was "too slow to be effectual against good batsmen" and "that though he may now and then get a wicket, runs are sure to come at the rate of six or eight an over".

Clem Hill said, "As a captain Harry Trott was in a class by himself—the best I ever played under. Harry was quick to grasp a situation. He saw an opponent's weakness in a second. [...] Time and time again, he got a champion batsman's wicket by putting on a bowler he knew the batsman did not like." The English batsman K. S. Ranjitsinhji considered Trott as a captain "without a superior anywhere today". Wisden thought him, "with the exception of [Billy Murdoch] ... incomparably the best captain the Australians had ever had in this country." The sporting newspaper The Referee wrote, "[Trott's] bowlers felt he understood the gruelling nature of their work and that they had his sympathy in the grimmest of battles." Some English professional cricketers thought less of Trott's captaincy; wicket-keeper William Storer said, "I like a captain to have a settled plan, [Trott] just seemed to do whatever he thought of at the moment."

=== Personality ===
Trott's sense of humour was well known. He originated a persistent myth that workers at the Sheffield steelworks generated extra plumes of smoke when the Australians were batting at nearby Bramall Lane, in order to reduce the quality of the light. When Australia played the Gentlemen of Philadelphia in the United States, a local reporter asked Trott why Australians did not play baseball. He replied: "Running around in circles makes us giddy." When Trott, a humble postman, met the Prince of Wales (later Edward VII) in 1896, his teammates admired his natural ease of manner in the presence of royalty. Given a cigar by the Prince, Trott simply smoked it, to the surprise of those who thought a royal souvenir worth keeping. With this in mind, Trott later played a practical joke when he returned home. Gathering cigar butts on board the ship before disembarking in Australia, he distributed them to his friends claiming it was the one given to him by the Prince of Wales; he asked the recipients not to tell others in case it provoked jealousy. Trott was extremely fond of hats; a teammate described him as "... the only man I have seen who, in the nude, had to have a hat on his head".

Jack Pollard wrote "It was said that [Trott] never made an enemy and was universally admired." His rival, England captain Archie MacLaren said "I would give anything to play the game as keenly and yet as light-heartedly as Trott's lads did." He was "imperturbable, good-humoured ... few Australian captains have been better liked and respected".

The personal popularity that Harry Trott enjoyed ... was remarkable. One is inclined to think that no Australian captain before or since, was liked so much by his opponents. By sheer force of character he overcame the disadvantages involved in lack of education, and won the warm regard of men with whom, apart from the comradeship of the cricket field, he had nothing in common.

— Wisden Cricketers' Almanack obituary
