= Ernie Jones (Australian sportsman) =

Australian sportsman (1869–1943)

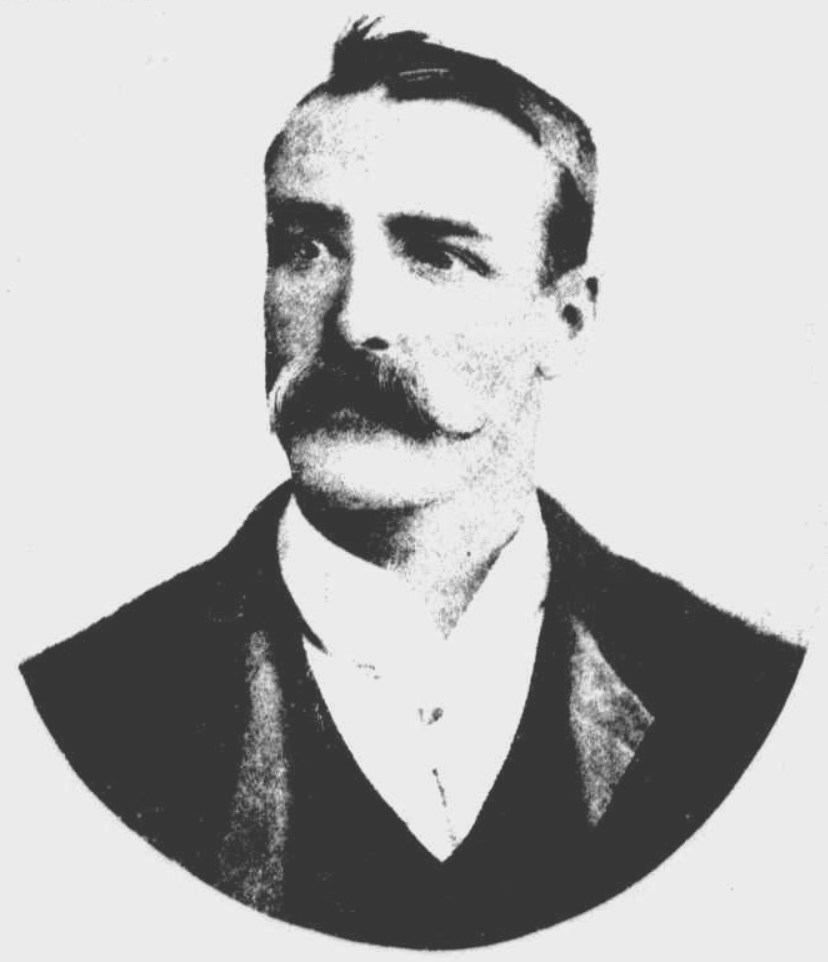
- Jones pictured in 1894

Personal information
- Born: 30 September 1869; Auburn, South Australia
- Died: 23 November 1943 (aged 58); Magill, Adelaide, South Australia
- Batting: Right-handed
- Bowling: Right-arm fast

International information
- National side: Australia (1894–1902)
- Test debut (cap 66): 14 December 1894 v England
- Last Test: 11 October 1902 v South Africa

Career statistics
Competition	Test	First-class
Matches	19	144
Runs scored	126	2,390
Batting average	5.04	13.13
100s/50s	0/0	0/7
Top score	20	82
Balls bowled	3,754	31,755
Wickets	64	641
Bowling average	29.01	22.83
5 wickets in innings	3	47
10 wickets in match	1	9
Best bowling	7/88	8/39
Catches/stumpings	21/–	107/–
- Source: Cricinfo, 13 October 2022

Ernest Jones (30 September 1869 – 23 November 1943) was an Australian sportsman, playing Test cricket and Australian rules football.

Jones played 19 Tests from 1894 to 1902 and represented Port Adelaide, North Adelaide and South Adelaide Football Clubs. Nicknamed Jonah, Jones was one of the best and fastest bowlers of his time, initially erratic but subsequently gaining control of line and length to good effect. Jones worked as a customs officer, and one of his claims to fame as a cricketer was that he was known as 'The man who bowled a ball through W. G. Grace's Beard' and was reputed to have broken Stanley Jackson's ribs.

His bowling action was controversial and complained about in both England (in 1896) and Australia. Umpire Jim Phillips was given the job of enforcing the laws against illegal bowling actions which had once more crept into the game in the late 1890s. Jones was first no-balled for his action in a match between South Australia and the visiting English side in 1897–98. Phillips again no-balled him once in the 2nd Test of that series, Jones thus becoming the first bowler to be called for throwing in a Test match.

== Sources ==
- Krueger, G. (2011) South Adelaide Football Club 1897–1907, Self-Published: Adelaide.
