= Charles Turner (Australian cricketer) =

Australian cricketer

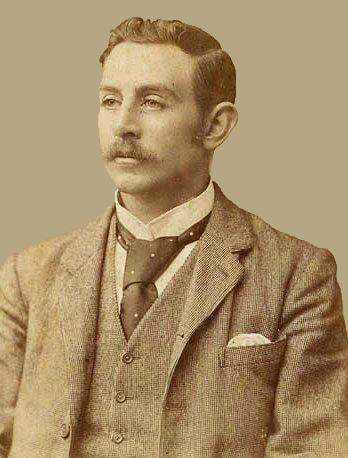

Personal information
- Full name: Charles Thomas Biass Turner
- Born: 16 November 1862; Bathurst, New South Wales, Australia
- Died: 1 January 1944 (aged 81); Manly, New South Wales, Australia
- Nickname: Terror
- Height: 5 ft 9 in (1.75 m)
- Batting: Right-handed
- Bowling: Right-arm medium-fast
- Role: Bowler
- Relatives: AE Goldman (brother-in-law)

International information
- National side: Australia
- Test debut (cap 46): 28 January 1887 v England
- Last Test: 1 February 1895 v England

Domestic team information
- Years: Team
- 1882–1910: New South Wales

Career statistics
Competition	Test	First-class
Matches	17	155
Runs scored	323	3,856
Batting average	11.53	15.54
100s/50s	0/0	2/11
Top score	29	103
Balls bowled	5,179	41,795
Wickets	101	993
Bowling average	16.53	14.25
5 wickets in innings	11	102
10 wickets in match	2	35
Best bowling	7/43	9/15
Catches/stumpings	8/–	85/–
- Source: CricketArchive, 14 April 2009

Charles Thomas Biass Turner (16 November 1862 – 1 January 1944) was a bowler who is regarded as one of the finest ever produced by Australia. Among his accomplishments were:

- taking 283 wickets in the English season of 1888 for 11.27 runs each. This tally was 69 wickets ahead of Ted Peate's 1882 record, and has been bettered only by Tom Richardson in 1895 and Tich Freeman in 1928 and 1933.
- taking 314 wickets in all matches in 1888.
- taking 106 wickets in twelve matches in the Australian season of 1887–88 – a record for any bowler in Australia
- taking 17 wickets for 50 runs against an England Eleven at Hastings in 1888. Of these 17, 14 were bowled, two lbw and one stumped.
- being the first Australian bowler to reach 100 wickets in Test matches.
- his 12 for 87 against England in his record season of 1887–1888 is still the best bowling analysis for a Test at the SCG.
- the only bowler to take 50 wickets in their first six Test matches.

Turner was born in Bathurst, New South Wales. His early adventures in first-class cricket were unsuccessful, but in 1886–87, when he moved from Bathurst to Sydney to become a banker, his skill developed to a remarkable degree with 70 first-class wickets at 7.68 runs each from just seven matches. In two games against Victoria he took eighteen wickets for 184 runs, but it was his excellence against Alfred Shaw's touring side that brought Turner acclaim in the English cricket community. In the first Test, after England were put in on a very sticky pitch, Turner took 6/15 in the first innings, and in the second his combined figures were nine for 93.

The following year, Turner, with the Australian pitches already notorious for being difficult after rain, had a strong season in the wet weather of a La Niña summer, his best performances outside the Test including:

- 10 for 45 v Arthur Shrewsbury's XI;
- 16 for 79 in a second match v Arthur Shrewsbury's XI;
- 11 for 119 v G.F. Vernon's XI at the MCG;
- 5 for 17 in first innings for New South Wales v Victoria at the MCG.

In the English summer of 1888, along with John Ferris, Turner was prolific. However, he took ten for 53 in Australia's only win in the three-Test series at Lord's and took 9 for 15 versus An England Eleven at Stoke-on-Trent. He showed ability as a batsman, scoring a maiden century at The Oval in the first game of the tour.

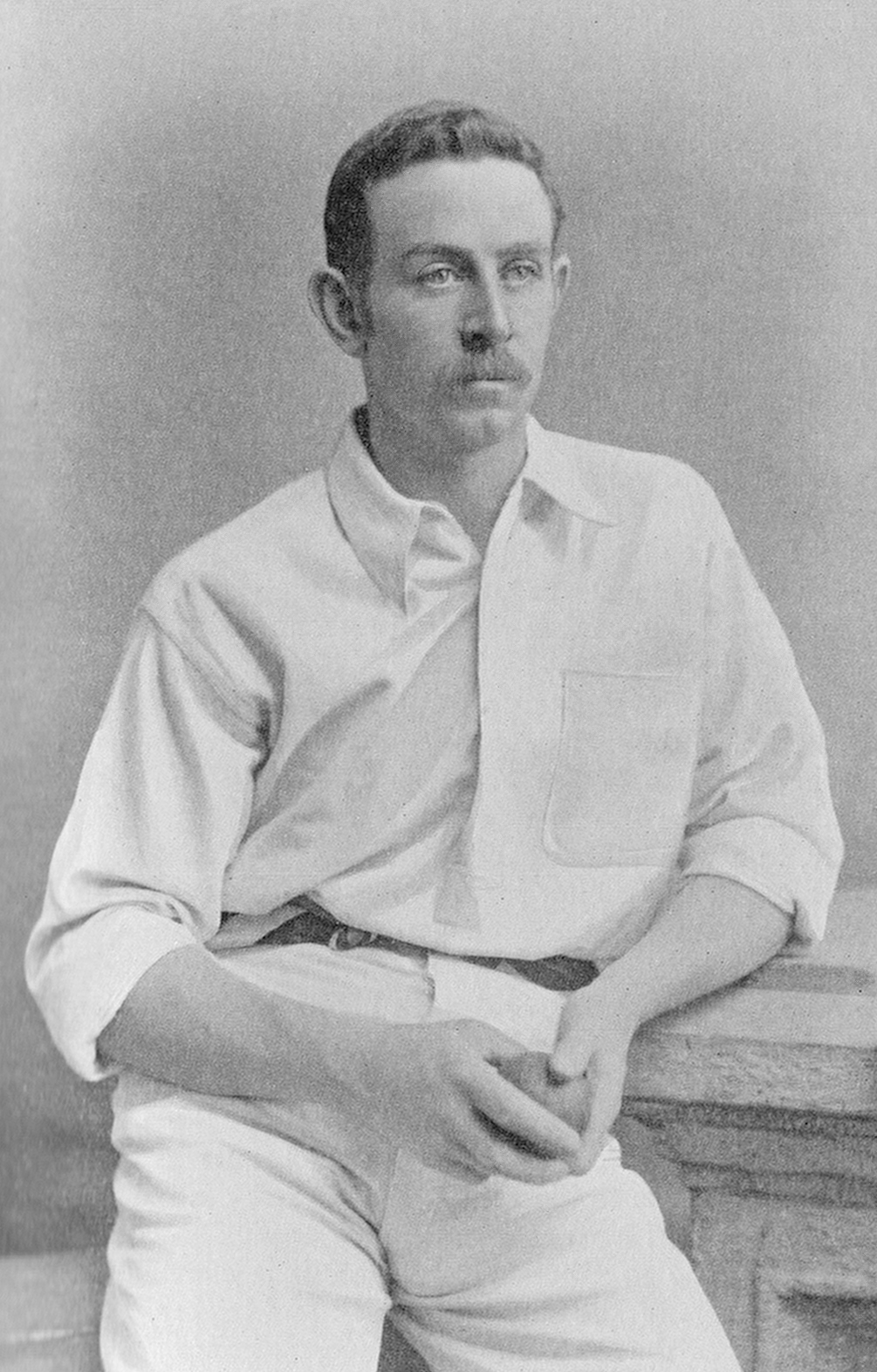
Turner, "The Terror"

After three extremely prolific seasons, Turner could not maintain his productivity. With El Niño holding sway, the wickets in Australia in 1888–89 were unresponsive and Turner took only 29 wickets in six games, and even fewer the following season. However, still regarded as the best bowler for English conditions, Turner did not disappoint the selectors in 1890, taking 179 first-class wickets (215 in all games) but being unable to break England's dominance of Test cricket at the time.

In the following few Australian seasons, Turner continued to do well even if too little cricket was played for him to equal his records of the late 1880s. In the relatively dry English summer of 1893, Turner still was Australia's leading bowler with 148 wickets at 13.63, but the absence of Ferris and business commitments were slowly taking their toll on him. During this tour his speed was measured electronically at Woolwich Arsenal and timed at 81 feet per second, or 55 miles an hour.

When England next toured in 1894–95, Turner equalled Fred Spofforth's record of 94 Test wickets in the Second Test at Melbourne on 31 December 1894, two days after the England bowler Johnny Briggs. The three men briefly held the record together, but Turner missed the Third Test at Adelaide and Briggs overtook him. Briggs became the first man to claim 100 Test wickets in the Fourth Test at Sydney on 1 February 1895, Turner being the second on 4 February in his last Test match. Turner had the unique (in Test cricket) distinction of having Bobby Peel stumped for a pair on a sticky wicket in Sydney. His record in this Test series was, actually, his best since 1888, but two years later his banking business required him to move to Queensland, where he was not able then to continue playing cricket apart from one match for his benefit as late as the 1909–10 season – when he was 47 – that was not successful.

Many batsmen who played against him considered Turner without peer. He bowled right-hand medium pace with a relatively long and rhythmic run-up and a beautiful delivery that never aimed to exploit even his rather limited height of five feet nine inches (175 centimetres). He could vary his pace a great deal, and combined this with an accurate length and a sharply-turning off-break that made him very difficult on rain-affected wickets. This unplayability on treacherous pitches earned him the nickname "Terror" Turner.

However, Turner continued to do service to the game in Australia as an administrator right through the early twentieth century. He commented, notably, on how greatly the game in Australia changed after the era in which he played due to a drier climate and improved pitch preparation (and also covering of pitches in Shield matches from the 1930s), which made Australian pitches almost impossible for bowlers of his type and led to reliance on leg spin.

On 15 January 2007, Turner was named in the NSW Cricket Team All Time Twelve, as part of the celebrations of 150 years of the NSW Cricket Team.

Charles Turner's ashes are now in the council chambers of Bathurst and a plaque at the Bathurst Oval recognises his services to both cricket and to Bathurst. His father Charles Turner and his father before him, Robert Turner arrived from England as a free settler from Leeds, England owned and ran several hotels in Bathurst including the Royal Hotel which still stands.
