= Australian cricket team in England in 1893 =

International cricket tour

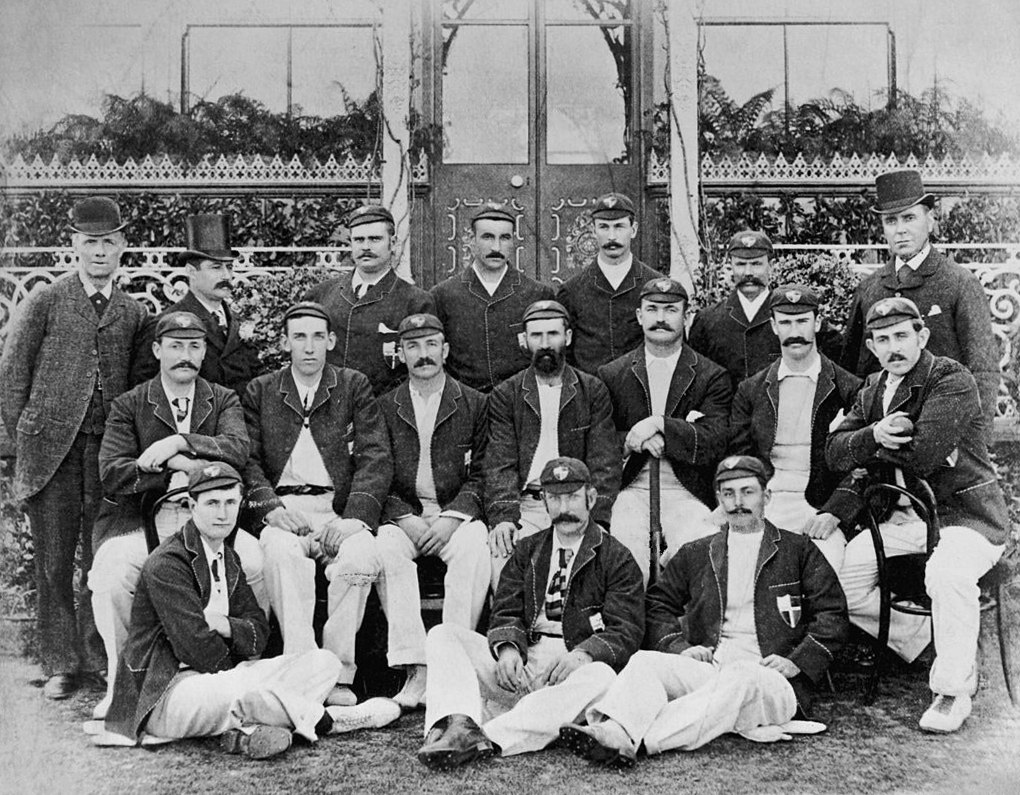
1893 Australian national cricket team

The Australian cricket team played 31 first-class matches in England in 1893, including 3 Tests. One of the first-class matches was against the Oxford and Cambridge Universities Past and Present team in Portsmouth. In their first innings, the Australians scored 843 runs, with eight of their batsmen scoring half-centuries. This is the only instance in first-class cricket with eight half-centuries being scored in the same innings.

== Test series summary ==
England won the Test series 1–0 with two matches drawn.

=== First Test ===
17–19 July 1893
Scorecard

England	v	Australia
334 (125 overs); A Shrewsbury 106; CTB Turner 6/67 (36 overs)		269 (114.1 overs); H Graham 107; WH Lockwood 6/101 (45 overs)
234/8 (116.4 overs); A Shrewsbury 81; G Giffen 5/43 (26.4 overs)

Match drawn
Lord's, London
Umpires: W Hearn (ENG) and J Phillips (AUS)

- England won the toss and elected to bat.
- FS Jackson, E Wainwright, WH Lockwood, AW Mold (all ENG), and H Graham (AUS) made their Test debuts.

=== Second Test ===
14–16 August 1893
Scorecard

England	v	Australia
483 (187 overs); FS Jackson 103; G Giffen 7/128 (54 overs)		91 (37.3 overs); JJ Lyons 19; J Briggs 5/34 (14.3 overs)
		349 (f/o) (98 overs); GHS Trott 92; J Briggs 5/114 (35 overs)

England won by an innings and 43 runs
The Oval, London
Umpires: CK Pullin (ENG) and H Draper (ENG)

- England won the toss and elected to bat.
- A Ward (ENG) made his Test debut.

=== Third Test ===
24–26 August 1893
Scorecard

Australia	v	England
204 (96.4 overs); W Bruce 68; T Richardson 5/49 (23.4 overs)		243 (140.2 overs); W Gunn 102*; G Giffen 4/113 (67 overs)
236 (95.3 overs); AC Bannerman 60; T Richardson 5/107 (44 overs)		118/4 (63 overs); WG Grace 45; H Trumble 3/49 (25 overs)

Match drawn
Old Trafford, Manchester
Umpires: C Clements (ENG) and J Phillips (AUS)

- Australia won the toss and elected to bat.
- W Brockwell and T Richardson (both ENG) made their Test debuts.

== Ceylon ==
As on previous voyages to England, the Australians had a stopover in Colombo and played a match on 5 April against a Ceylon team, which was drawn.

== Annual reviews ==
- James Lillywhite's Cricketers' Annual (Red Lilly) 1894
- Wisden Cricketers' Almanack 1894
