= 1894 English cricket season =

Cricket season review

The 1894 English cricket season featured the fifth edition of the County Championship. The championship culminated in a close battle between Surrey and the 1893 champions Yorkshire. Before the round of 23 August, the two teams were tied on 10 points, with one match left to play and all other teams out of contention. Yorkshire travelled to Taunton to play Somerset and, after the first day was rained off, Somerset had to bat on a rain-affected pitch. George Hirst took seven for 32 as Somerset were dismissed for 99, but Yorkshire never got the chance to reply as the third day was rained off. Meanwhile, at Hove, Surrey's Tom Richardson and Bill Lockwood bowling Sussex out for 44 and 109 to secure victory by an innings and 15 runs, giving Surrey their fourth official title.

Although the term had been in common usage for many years, there was no clear understanding of what constituted first-class cricket. The issue was addressed in a meeting at Lord's in May and the official definition was applied from the beginning of the 1895 season. (Note: Any match listed in the ACS' Important Match Guide (1981) is historically important, and therefore of the highest standard, whether or not a scorecard might exist. The same applies to numerous matches discovered by researchers since 1981. For further information, see First-class cricket.)

== Honours ==
- County Championship – Surrey
- Wisden (Five Young Batsmen of the Season) – Bill Brockwell, Jack Brown, C B Fry, Tom Hayward, Archie MacLaren

== County Championship ==
=== Final table ===
County Championship 1894 – Final Standings
	Team	P	W	L	D	T	A	Pts
1	Surrey	16	13	2	0	1	0	11
2	Yorkshire	16	12	2	1	0	1	10
3	Middlesex	16	8	5	3	0	0	3
4	Lancashire	16	7	7	1	1	0	0
4	Kent	16	6	6	3	0	1	0
6	Somerset	16	6	7	3	0	0	−1
7	Nottinghamshire	16	4	8	4	0	0	−4
8	Sussex	16	3	11	2	0	0	−8
9	Gloucestershire	16	2	13	1	0	0	−11

Points system:

- 1 for a win
- 0 for a draw, a tie or an abandoned match
- -1 for a loss

=== Most runs in the County Championship ===
1894 County Championship – leading batsmen
Name	Team	Matches	Runs	Average	100s	50s
Billy Gunn	Nottinghamshire	13	851	37.00	2	5
Bill Brockwell	Surrey	16	754	34.27	3	3
Albert Ward	Lancashire	16	751	26.82	2	4
Lionel Palairet	Somerset	16	748	25.79	1	5
Frank Sugg	Lancashire	16	717	28.68	2	3

=== Most wickets in the County Championship ===
1893 County Championship – leading bowlers
Name	Team	Matches	Balls bowled	Wickets taken	Average
Arthur Mold	Lancashire	16	4094	144	11.36
Tom Richardson	Surrey	14	2951	120	11.31
John Hearne	Middlesex	16	4833	119	14.03
Walter Hearne	Kent	15	3569	99	13.35
Ted Wainwright	Yorkshire	15	2617	97	10.17

== Overall first-class statistics ==
=== Leading batsmen ===
1893 English cricket season – leading batsmen
Name	Team(s)	Matches	Runs	Average	100s	50s
Bill Brockwell	Players, South of England, Surrey	32	1491	38.23	5	6
Bobby Abel	Players, South of England, Surrey	31	1447	34.45	4	6
Jack Brown	North of England, Yorkshire	31	1399	30.41	3	8
WG Grace	Gentlemen, Gloucestershire, Marylebone Cricket Club (MCC), South of England	27	1293	29.38	3	5
Albert Ward	Lancashire, North of England, Players	28	1176	25.02	2	6

=== Leading bowlers ===
1893 English cricket season – leading bowlers
Name	Team(s)	Matches	Balls bowled	Wickets taken	Average
Arthur Mold	England, Lancashire, North of England, Players	28	6493	207	12.30
Tom Richardson	Surrey	23	4669	196	10.32
John Hearne	Marylebone Cricket Club (MCC), Middlesex, Players, South of England	31	7430	195	14.04
Edward Wainwright	North of England, Players, Yorkshire	28	5438	166	12.73
Bill Lockwood	Players, South of England, Surrey	28	4472	150	14.88

== Bibliography ==
- ACS (1981). A Guide to Important Cricket Matches Played in the British Isles 1709–1863. Nottingham: ACS. OCLC 85045528.
- ACS (1982). A Guide to First-class Cricket Matches Played in the British Isles. Nottingham: ACS. OCLC 10586869.
- Warner, Pelham (1946). Lords: 1787–1945. London: Harrap. OCLC 877106024.

== Annual reviews ==
- James Lillywhite's Cricketers' Annual (Red Lilly), Lillywhite, 1895
- Wisden Cricketers' Almanack, 1895
