= 1893 English cricket season =

Cricket season review

The 1893 English cricket season featured the fourth edition of the County Championship. For the first time, the official championship was won by a team other than Surrey, who finished fifth. Yorkshire, captained by Lord Hawke won twelve matches to take the title. It was the first of a record eight championships (1893, 1896, 1898, 1900–1902, 1905 and 1908) for Hawke as a county captain. (Note: Any match listed in the ACS' Important Match Guide (1981) is historically important, and therefore of the highest standard, whether or not a scorecard might exist. The same applies to numerous matches discovered by researchers since 1981. For further information, see First-class cricket.)

An Australian team toured the British Isles for the first time in three years, but lost the three-match Ashes Test series to England. It was the 15th Test series between the two teams and England won 1–0.

== Honours ==
- County Championship – Yorkshire
- Wisden (Five All-Round Cricketers) – George Giffen, Alec Hearne, Stanley Jackson, Harry Trott, Ted Wainwright

== County Championship ==
=== Final table ===
	Team	P	W	L	D	Pts
1	Yorkshire	16	12	3	1	9
2	Lancashire	16	9	5	2	4
3	Middlesex	16	9	6	1	3
4	Kent	16	6	4	6	2
5	Surrey	16	7	8	1	−1
6	Nottinghamshire	16	5	7	4	−2
7	Sussex	16	4	7	5	−3
8	Somerset	16	4	8	4	−4
9	Gloucestershire	16	3	11	2	−8

Points system:

- 1 for a win
- 0 for a draw
- -1 for a loss

=== Best batting average in the County Championship ===
1893 County Championship – leading batsmen
Name	Team	Matches	Runs	Average	100s	50s
Billy Gunn	Nottinghamshire	16	1223	47.03	5	3
Andrew Stoddart	Middlesex	14	1178	47.12	3	6
Arthur Shrewsbury	Nottinghamshire	16	920	41.84	4	0
Albert Ward	Lancashire	16	1035	38.33	2	5
Billy Murdoch	Sussex	16	965	35.74	0	9

=== Most wickets in the County Championship ===
1893 County Championship – leading bowlers
Name	Team	Matches	Balls bowled	Wickets taken	Average
John Hearne	Middlesex	16	5798	137	16.04
Walter Humphreys senior	Sussex	16	3219	122	16.43
Arthur Mold	Lancashire	15	4104	117	14.99
Johnny Briggs	Lancashire	16	4212	108	13.75
Tom Richardson	Surrey	13	2686	99	14.34

== Ashes tour ==
England won a fifth successive home series against Australia to recover The Ashes after losing them in the 1891–92 series in Australia. W. G. Grace was injured for one of the Tests, but captained England in the other two. The first Test ended in a draw, but England took advantage of a 392-run lead on first innings to beat the visitors by an innings and 43 runs in the second Test, while the third and final Test was another draw.

Cumulative record - Test wins	1876–1893
England	20
Australia	12
Drawn	6

== Overall first-class statistics ==
=== Leading batsmen ===
1893 English cricket season – leading batsmen
Name	Team(s)	Matches	Runs	Average	100s	50s
Andrew Stoddart	England, Gentlemen, Marylebone Cricket Club (MCC), Middlesex, South of England	28	2072	42.28	4	13
Billy Gunn	England, Marylebone Cricket Club (MCC), Nottinghamshire, Players	30	2057	42.85	7	8
W. G. Grace	England, Gentlemen, Gloucestershire, Marylebone Cricket Club (MCC), South of England	28	1609	35.75	1	11
Arthur Shrewsbury	England, Nottinghamshire, Players	25	1586	40.66	5	7
Albert Ward	England, Lancashire, North of England	24	1435	35.87	2	8

=== Leading bowlers ===
1893 English cricket season – leading bowlers
Name	Team(s)	Matches	Balls bowled	Wickets taken	Average
John Hearne	Marylebone Cricket Club (MCC), Middlesex, Players, South of England	29	8709	212	16.47
Tom Richardson	England, Players, South of England, Surrey	23	4969	174	15.40
Johnny Briggs	England, Lancashire, North of England, Players	28	6820	166	15.89
Arthur Mold	England, Lancashire, North of England, Players	28	6409	166	16.96
Bill Lockwood	England, Players, South of England, Surrey	27	4652	150	16.78
Walter Humphreys senior	South of England, Sussex	21	4044	150	17.32

== Bibliography ==
- ACS (1981). A Guide to Important Cricket Matches Played in the British Isles 1709–1863. Nottingham: ACS. OCLC 85045528.
- ACS (1982). A Guide to First-class Cricket Matches Played in the British Isles. Nottingham: ACS. OCLC 10586869.
- Warner, Pelham (1946). Lords: 1787–1945. London: Harrap. OCLC 877106024.

== Annual reviews ==
- James Lillywhite's Cricketers' Annual (Red Lilly), Lillywhite, 1894
- Wisden Cricketers' Almanack, 1894
