= 1894 County Championship =

English cricket tournament

- Cricket format: First-class cricket (3 days)
- Tournament format: League system
- Champions: Surrey (4th title)
- Participants: 9
- Matches: 72
- Most runs: William Gunn (851 for Nottinghamshire)
- Most wickets: Arthur Mold (144 for Lancashire)

The 1894 County Championship was the fifth officially organised running of the County Championship, and ran from 14 May to 30 August 1894. Surrey reclaimed the title that Yorkshire had taken from them the previous season.

== Table ==
- One point was awarded for a win, and one point was taken away for each loss.

Team	Pld	W	T	L	D	A	Pts
Surrey	16	13	1	2	0	0	11
Yorkshire	16	12	0	2	1	1	10
Middlesex	16	8	0	5	3	0	3
Kent	16	6	0	6	3	1	0
Lancashire	16	7	1	7	1	0	0
Somerset	16	6	0	7	3	0	–1
Nottinghamshire	16	4	0	8	4	0	–4
Sussex	16	3	0	11	2	0	–8
Gloucestershire	16	2	0	13	1	0	–11

== Leading averages ==
Most runs
Aggregate	Average	Player	County
851	37.00	William Gunn	Nottinghamshire
754	34.27	Bill Brockwell	Surrey
751	26.82	Albert Ward	Lancashire
748	25.79	Lionel Palairet	Somerset
717	28.68	Frank Sugg	Lancashire

Most wickets
Aggregate	Average	Player	County
144	11.36	Arthur Mold	Lancashire
120	11.31	Tom Richardson	Surrey
119	14.03	J. T. Hearne	Middlesex
99	13.35	Walter Hearne	Kent
97	10.17	Ted Wainwright	Yorkshire
