= 1891 County Championship =

British cricket tournament

- Cricket format: First-class cricket (3 days)
- Tournament format: League system
- Champions: Surrey (2nd title)
- Participants: 9
- Matches: 68
- Most runs: Bobby Abel (916 for Surrey)
- Most wickets: George Lohmann (132 for Surrey)

The 1891 County Championship was the second officially organised running of the County Championship, and ran from 18 May to 27 August 1891. Surrey County Cricket Club claimed their second successive title by winning 12 of their 16 games.

== Table ==
- One point was awarded for a win, and one point was taken away for each loss.

Team	Pld	W	T	L	D	A	Pts
Surrey	16	12	0	2	2	0	10
Lancashire	16	8	0	4	3	1	4
Middlesex	16	8	0	5	3	0	3
Nottinghamshire	14	5	0	4	5	0	1
Kent	16	4	0	5	6	1	–1
Somerset	12	5	0	6	1	0	–1
Sussex	14	4	0	7	3	0	–3
Yorkshire	16	5	0	10	1	0	–5
Gloucestershire	16	2	0	10	4	0	–8

== Leading averages ==
Most runs
Aggregate	Average	Player	County
916	43.61	Bobby Abel	Surrey
794	41.78	Arthur Shrewsbury	Nottinghamshire
780	43.33	William Gunn	Nottinghamshire
773	33.60	George Bean	Sussex
755	35.95	Tim O'Brien	Middlesex

Most wickets
Aggregate	Average	Player	County
132	10.65	George Lohmann	Surrey
118	10.33	J. T. Hearne	Middlesex
112	12.37	Arthur Mold	Lancashire
98	13.10	Frederick Martin	Kent
89	12.96	Johnny Briggs	Lancashire
