= 1892 County Championship =

British cricket tournament

- Cricket format: First-class cricket (3 days)
- Tournament format: League system
- Champions: Surrey (3rd title)
- Participants: 9
- Matches: 72
- Most runs: Herbie Hewett (1,047 for Somerset)
- Most wickets: William Lockwood (114 for Surrey)

The 1892 County Championship was the third officially organised running of the County Championship in cricket in England, and ran from 18 May to 27 August 1892. Surrey County Cricket Club claimed their third successive title by winning 13 of their 16 games. The match between Lancashire and Somerset at Old Trafford finished within one day, when Somerset were bowled out for 88 and 58.

== Table ==
- One point was awarded for a win, and one point was taken away for each loss.

Team	Pld	W	T	L	D	Pts
Surrey	16	13	0	2	1	11
Nottinghamshire	16	10	0	2	4	8
Somerset	16	8	0	5	3	3
Lancashire	16	7	0	5	4	2
Middlesex	16	7	0	6	3	1
Yorkshire	16	5	0	5	6	0
Gloucestershire	16	1	0	8	7	–7
Kent	16	2	0	9	5	–7
Sussex	16	1	0	12	3	–11

== Leading averages ==
Most runs
Aggregate	Average	Player	County
1,047	40.26	Herbie Hewett	Somerset
920	41.81	Arthur Shrewsbury	Nottinghamshire
896	40.72	Walter Read	Surrey
861	39.13	Stanley Scott	Middlesex
848	30.28	Andrew Stoddart	Middlesex

Most wickets
Aggregate	Average	Player	County
114	13.26	William Lockwood	Surrey
104	13.70	Arthur Mold	Lancashire
102	13.87	George Lohmann	Surrey
100	16.23	J. T. Hearne	Middlesex
97	12.79	William Attewell	Nottinghamshire
