= 1889 English cricket season =

Cricket season review

The 1889 English cricket season was the 26th since the legalisation of overarm bowling. The number of balls per over was increased from four to five. The four-ball over had been used since time immemorial. (Note: Some eleven-a-side matches played from 1772 to 1863 have been rated "first-class" by certain sources. However, the term only came into common use around 1864, when overarm bowling was legalised. It was formally defined as a standard by a meeting at Lord's, in May 1894, of Marylebone Cricket Club (MCC) and the county clubs which were then competing in the County Championship. The ruling was effective from the beginning of the 1895 season, but pre-1895 matches of the same standard have no official definition of status because the ruling is not retrospective. Matches of a similar standard since the beginning of the 1864 season are generally considered to have an unofficial first-class status. Pre-1864 matches which are included in the ACS' "Important Match Guide" may generally be regarded as top-class or, at least, historically significant. For further information, see First-class cricket.)

Earlier in the year, on 12 and 13 March, South Africa versus England at Port Elizabeth was the start of cricket in South Africa at both Test and first-class level. Domestic first-class matches began at the end of the same year. England, captained by future Hollywood actor C Aubrey Smith, played two Tests on the inaugural tour, at Port Elizabeth and Cape Town, winning both by comfortable margins. Lancashire spinner Johnny Briggs had match figures of 15–28 at Cape Town.

== Honours ==
- Champion County^{[a]} – Surrey, Lancashire, Nottinghamshire (shared)
- Wisden (Nine Great Professional Batsmen) – Bobby Abel, Billy Barnes, Billy Gunn, Louis Hall, Robert Henderson, Maurice Read, Arthur Shrewsbury, Frank Sugg, Albert Ward

=== Playing record (by county) ===
County	Played	Won	Lost	Drawn	Points^{[b]}
Gloucestershire	14	3	7	4	5.0
Kent	13^{[c]}	7	5	1	7.5
Lancashire	14	10	3	1	10.5
Middlesex	11^{[c]}	3	5	3	4.5
Nottinghamshire	14	9	2	3	10.5
Surrey	14	10	3	1	10.5
Sussex	12	1	10	1	1.5
Yorkshire	14	2	10	2	3.0

== Leading batsmen (qualification 20 innings) ==
1889 English season leading batsmen
Name	Team	Matches	Innings	Not outs	Runs	Highest score	Average	100s	50s
William Gunn	Nottinghamshire; Marylebone Cricket Club (MCC)	26	40	5	1319	118	37.68	4	3
Arthur Shrewsbury	Nottinghamshire	12	16	2	522	104	37.28	1	3
Billy Barnes	Nottinghamshire; Marylebone Cricket Club (MCC)	27	40	4	1249	130 not out	34.69	3	6
Maurice Read	Surrey	17	27	2	847	136	33.88	1	6
WG Grace	Gloucestershire; Marylebone Cricket Club (MCC)	24	45	2	1396	154	32.46	3	7

== Leading bowlers (qualification 1,000 balls) ==
1889 English season leading bowlers
Name	Team	Balls bowled	Runs conceded	Wickets taken	Average	Best bowling	5 wickets in innings	10 wickets in match
William Attewell	Nottinghamshire; Marylebone Cricket Club (MCC)	6817	1635	149	10.97	6/24	13	2
Johnny Briggs	Lancashire	6208	1647	140	11.76	7/22	14	3
Arthur Mold	Lancashire	3390	1205	102	11.81	7/35	9	3
Alec Watson	Lancashire	4253	1139	90	12.65	7/27	9	2
Wilfred Flowers	Nottinghamshire; Marylebone Cricket Club (MCC)	2385	702	55	12.76	6/53	4	1

== Notable events ==
- In May and June, the flooding and waterlogging of Lord's caused three games to be abandoned without a ball bowled - the first recorded instance in English cricket.
- Declarations of an innings were permitted for the first time on the third day of a match. The first captain to declare was John Shuter against Gloucestershire on 8 June.
- 20 to 22 June – Middlesex and Yorkshire break the 1876 record for the highest aggregate of runs in a first-class match in England, totalling 1,295 over the three days to surpass the previous English record by 78 runs.
- The use of an unofficial points system by the "Cricket Reporting Agency", which had begun in 1887, reached farcical levels when Surrey, Lancashire and Nottinghamshire finished tied on 10.5 points. This led to the devising in December of the first official County Championship in 1890.

== Labels ==
^{a} An unofficial seasonal title sometimes proclaimed by consensus of media and historians prior to December 1889 when the official County Championship was constituted. Although there are ante-dated claims prior to 1873, when residence qualifications were introduced, it is only since that ruling that any quasi-official status can be ascribed.
^{b} Between 1887 and 1889 an unofficial point system of 1 point for a win and 0.5 points for a draw, devised by the "Cricket Reporting Agency", was used to determine the unofficial "Champion County"
^{c} The match between Middlesex and Kent at Lord's was completely washed out

== Bibliography ==
- ACS (1981). A Guide to Important Cricket Matches Played in the British Isles 1709–1863. Nottingham: ACS. OCLC 85045528.
- ACS (1982). A Guide to First-class Cricket Matches Played in the British Isles. Nottingham: ACS. OCLC 10586869.
- Warner, Pelham (1946). Lords: 1787–1945. London: Harrap. OCLC 877106024.

== Annual reviews ==
- James Lillywhite's Cricketers' Annual (Red Lilly), Lillywhite, 1890
- Wisden Cricketers' Almanack, 1890
