= 1890 English cricket season =

Cricket season review

The 1890 English cricket season was the first in which the County Championship was held as an official competition, following agreement between MCC and the leading county clubs at a meeting in December 1889. Surrey became the first official county champions after winning nine out of fourteen games.

In Test cricket, England, captained by W. G. Grace, defeated Australia in a three-match series by 2–0 to win The Ashes. It was the 13th Test series between the teams. William Gunn of Nottinghamshire was the season's highest run-scorer (1,621); George Lohmann of Surrey took the most wickets (220). (Note: Any match listed in the ACS' Important Match Guide (1981) is historically important, and therefore of the highest standard, whether or not a scorecard might exist. The same applies to numerous matches discovered by researchers since 1981. For further information, see First-class cricket.)

== Honours ==
- County Championship – Surrey
- Wisden (Five Great Wicket-Keepers) – Jack Blackham, Gregor MacGregor, Dick Pilling, Mordecai Sherwin, Henry Wood

== Ashes tour ==
England won the three-match Test series 2–0. Only two matches were completed as one was abandoned due to persistent heavy rain:

- 1st Test at Lord's Cricket Ground – England won by 7 wickets
- 2nd Test at The Oval – England won by 2 wickets
- 3rd Test at Old Trafford Cricket Ground – abandoned without a ball being bowled (rain)

Cumulative record - Test wins	1876–1890
England	18
Australia	10
Drawn	4

== Overall first-class statistics ==
=== Leading batsmen ===
1890 English cricket season - leading batsmen
Name	Team(s)	Matches	Runs	Average	100s	50s
Billy Gunn	England, Marylebone Cricket Club (MCC), North, Nottinghamshire, Players	30	1,621	34.48	3	3
Arthur Shrewsbury	England, North, Nottinghamshire, Players	25	1,568	41.26	2	9
W. G. Grace	England, Gentlemen, Gloucestershire, Marylebone Cricket Club (MCC), South	30	1,476	28.38	1	9
Billy Murdoch	Australia	33	1,394	24.45	2	6
Bobby Abel	Surrey	32	1,226	24.03	0	9

=== Leading bowlers ===
1890 English cricket season - leading bowlers
Name	Team(s)	Matches	Balls bowled	Wickets taken	Average
George Lohmann	England, Players, South, Surrey	32	8,801	220	13.62
Frederick Martin	England, Kent, Marylebone Cricket Club (MCC), South	29	8,507	190	13.05
John Ferris	Australia	30	7,727	186	14.28
Charles Turner	Australia	31	7,528	179	14.21
Bobby Peel	England, North, Players, Yorkshire	33	7,755	171	13.07

== Bibliography ==
- ACS (1981). A Guide to Important Cricket Matches Played in the British Isles 1709–1863. Nottingham: ACS. OCLC 85045528.
- ACS (1982). A Guide to First-class Cricket Matches Played in the British Isles. Nottingham: ACS. OCLC 10586869.
- Warner, Pelham (1946). Lords: 1787–1945. London: Harrap. OCLC 877106024.

== Annual reviews ==
- Lillywhite. James Lillywhite's Cricketers' Annual (Red Lilly) (1891 ed.). Lillywhite.
- Wisden. Pardon, Charles (ed.). Wisden Cricketers' Almanack, 28th edition (1891 ed.). London: John Wisden & Co. Ltd.
