= Joseph Briggs =

English cricketer

Joseph Banner Briggs (4 June 1860 – 1 December 1902) was an English first-class cricketer active 1885–88 who played in seven matches for Nottinghamshire as a slow left arm spin bowler. The elder brother of Johnny Briggs, he was born in Sutton-in-Ashfield; died in Bramley, Leeds.
