= Bill Brockwell =

English cricketer

Billy Brockwell
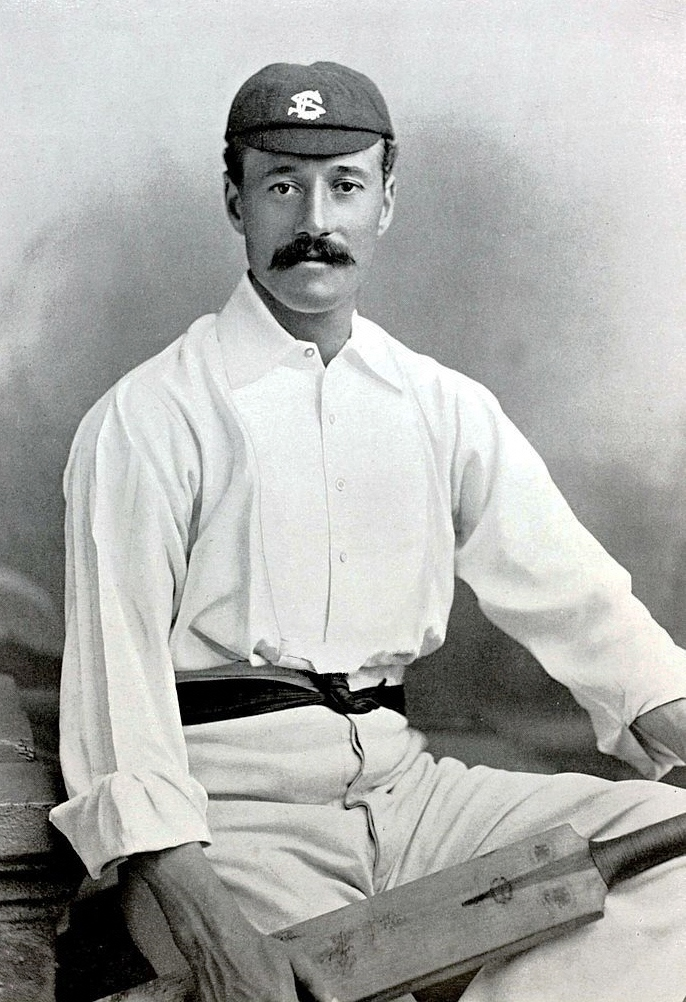
- Brockwell in about 1895

Personal information
- Born: 21 January 1865; Kingston upon Thames, Surrey
- Died: 1 July 1935 (aged 70); Richmond, Surrey
- Batting: Right-handed
- Bowling: Right-arm fast-medium

International information
- National side: England
- Test debut: 24 August 1893 v Australia
- Last Test: 19 July 1899 v Australia

Career statistics
Competition	Test	First-class
Matches	7	357
Runs scored	202	13,285
Batting average	16.83	27.00
100s/50s	0/0	21/53
Top score	49	225
Balls bowled	582	28,415
Wickets	5	553
Bowling average	61.79	24.73
5 wickets in innings	0	24
10 wickets in match	0	1
Best bowling	3/33	8/22
Catches/stumpings	250/1	250/1
- Source: CricInfo, 30 December 2021

William Brockwell (21 January 1865 – 1 July 1935) was an English cricketer. Although primarily remembered as a batsman, he began his career as a fast-medium bowler. With George Lohmann, Tom Richardson and William Lockwood carrying all before them, Brockwell had few opportunities until they declined. However, from 1897 onwards, he was a very useful bowler and took 105 wickets in the 1899 season when Richardson was out of form and Lockwood never fully fit. Even in 1902, he took six for 37 on an excellent pitch in the last match of the season against Warwickshire.

Born in Kingston upon Thames, Surrey, Brockwell played his county cricket for the very strong Surrey side of the last years of the 19th century. He made his first-class debut against Derbyshire in 1886. He played only occasionally up to 1890, but established himself in 1891 and 1892, when Surrey were at the height of their powers as a county side. However, it was not until 1893 that Brockwell became a vital member of the Surrey eleven, when he took 51 wickets at the same cost as the incomparable Richardson and, despite often going in late, proving to be one of the most consistent batsmen. In the very wet 1894 season, Brockwell, despite the consistently treacherous pitches, made a remarkable advance. He scored more runs (1,491) than any other player, and hit five centuries, and consequently was named as a Wisden Cricketer of the Year. He declined a great deal in 1895, but from the following year up to 1899, formed a formidable batting trio with Bobby Abel and Tom Hayward that made Surrey invincible on the perfect Oval pitches.

Brockwell played seven Test matches for England, all against Australia – one in 1893, five on the 1894/95 tour and a final match in 1899 – but was not a success at this level and averaged under 17 with a highest score of just 49. He played on for Surrey until 1903, but from 1900 his powers as a batsman declined severely and after two final first-class matches for London County he retired from cricket.

Brockwell was homeless in his last years and he died in poverty at Richmond, Surrey.
