= Gunn & Moore =

British sports equipment and clothing company

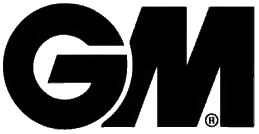
- Industry: Sports equipment, textile
- Founded: 1885; 141 years ago
- Founder: William Gunn; Thomas James Moore
- Headquarters: Colwick, Nottinghamshire, England,
- Area served: Australia, South Africa, New Zealand, United Kingdom, Bangladesh, India
- Products: Cricket clothing and equipment (bats, balls, helmet, batting gloves, protective gear, athletic shoes, bags)
- Website: gunnandmoore.playwiththebest.com gmcricket.in

Gunn & Moore (GM) is a British sports equipment and clothing company founded in 1885 based in Colwick, Nottinghamshire, England that specialises in cricket. It became part of the Unicorn Group in 1968.

The company produces cricket clothing and equipment such as bats, balls, helmet, batting gloves, protective gear, athletic shoes, and bags.

== Overview ==
Gunn & Moore was founded in 1885 by England Test batsman William Gunn and local businessman Thomas James Moore, and is most recognised for manufacturing cricket bats. The company also manufactures clothing and a full range of other cricket equipment.

The company was originally based at 49 Carrington Street in Nottingham.

== Endorsements ==
Many professional cricketers have had endorsement deals with the company.

List of Athletes
Country	Athlete
Australia	Steve Waugh
England	Ben Stokes
England	Dawid Malan
England	Michael Vaughan
India	Anil Kumble
South Africa	Quinton de Kock
South Africa	Graeme Smith
South Africa	Aiden Markram
New Zealand	Ross Taylor
New Zealand	Stephen Fleming
