= William Hearn (umpire) =

English cricketer and Test umpire

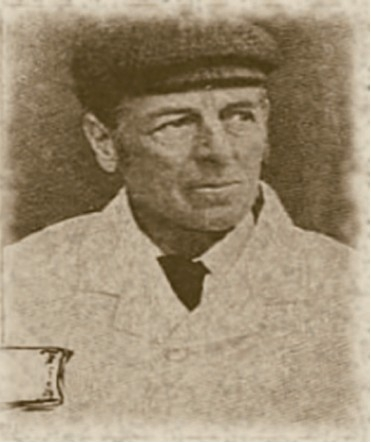
Hearn in 1901

William Hearn (30 November 1849 – 30 January 1904) was an English first-class cricketer and Test umpire. Born in Hertfordshire in 1849, he played 41 games for the Marylebone Cricket Club (MCC) between 1878 and 1891 as a right-handed batsman, scoring 806 runs with a best of 91. He umpired four Ashes Tests between 1893 and 1902.
