= George Lohmann =

English cricketer

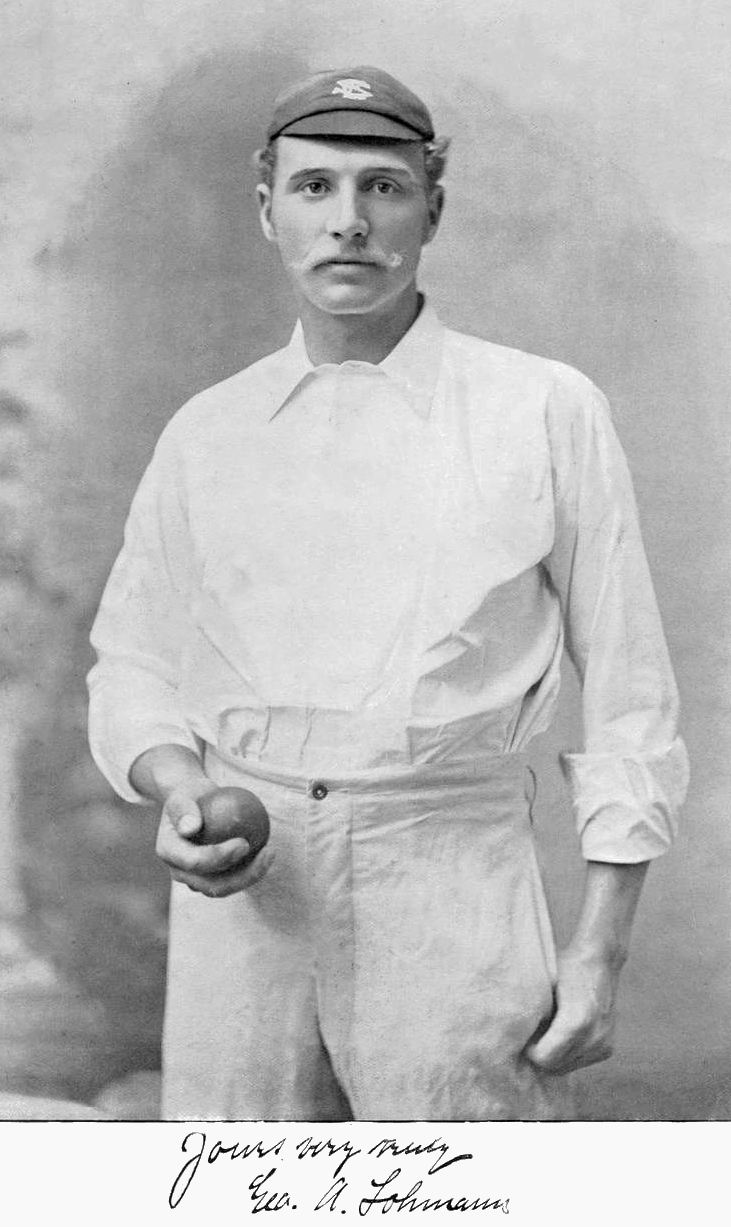
- Lohmann c. 1895

Personal information
- Full name: George Alfred Lohmann
- Born: 2 June 1865; Kensington, Middlesex, England
- Died: 1 December 1901 (aged 36); Worcester, British Cape Colony
- Batting: Right-handed
- Bowling: Right arm medium-fast

International information
- National side: England
- Test debut (cap 51): 5 July 1886 v Australia
- Last Test: 24 June 1896 v Australia

Domestic team information
- Years: Team
- 1884–1896: Surrey
- 1894–1897: Western Province

Career statistics
Competition	Test	First-class
Matches	18	293
Runs scored	213	7,247
Batting average	8.87	18.67
100s/50s	0/1	3/29
Top score	62*	115
Balls bowled	3,830	71,724
Wickets	112	1,841
Bowling average	10.75	13.73
5 wickets in innings	9	176
10 wickets in match	5	57
Best bowling	9/28	9/28
Catches/stumpings	28/–	337/–
- Source: Cricinfo, 1 October 2009

George Alfred Lohmann (2 June 1865 – 1 December 1901) was an English cricketer, regarded as one of the greatest bowlers of all time. Statistically, he holds the lowest lifetime Test bowling average among bowlers with more than fifteen wickets and he has the second highest peak rating for a bowler in the ICC ratings. He also holds the record for the lowest strike rate (balls bowled between each wicket taken) in all Test history.

Lohmann bowled at around medium pace and was capable of generating spin on English pitches of the era, making him particularly effective in rain-affected conditions. Against high-quality batsmen, he demonstrated considerable skill and variation in pace, flight, and movement. He was regarded as an accomplished slip fielder and contributed as a lower-order batsman in county cricket, scoring two centuries for Surrey and averaging 25 in the 1887 season.

In 2016, Lohmann was inducted into the ICC Cricket Hall of Fame.

== Early years ==
Lohmann played in a few colts matches at the beginning of 1884, and impressed sufficiently to play ten first-class cricket matches for Surrey that season. He did little bowling but nonetheless established himself as a regular member of the side for his promising batting.

The following season was nothing short of a sensation. Lohmann not only became Surrey's leading bowler, but was the leading first-class wicket-taker with 142 wickets. He also showed his promise as a batsman was no fluke, for he scored 571 runs. In 1886, Lohmann did equally well and played his first Test matches for England against Australia. He took only one wicket at Old Trafford, and none at Lord's, but his continued superb form in other first-class matches saw him retained for the last match at The Oval. Here, Lohmann established himself as a great bowler with a superb twelve for 104 (7 for 36 and 5 for 68), giving England what is still one of its most decisive wins in an Ashes series. Again being the leading first-class wicket-taker, Lohmann was chosen to tour Australia with Alfred Shaw's team.

== World's premier bowler ==
On his first tour, Lohmann moved even further ahead of the pack as a bowler. In the Second Test at the SCG, Lohmann became the first bowler to take eight wickets in a Test innings, and, in the abnormally dry English season of 1887, showed himself far ahead of any other bowler. Despite being severely punished during the middle of the season when handicapped by a finger injury, Lohmann took 154 wickets whereas the next highest was 114, becoming deadly when the weather broke up in August. He also made his highest score as a batsman, scoring 115 against Sussex at Hove, whilst his aggregate of runs for the season totalled 843. Lohmann again toured Australia in the winter of 1887/1888, and with Johnny Briggs formed an irresistible combination on a sticky wicket in the only Test match.

In 1888, a summer as wet as 1887 had been dry, Lohmann took full advantage of the dreadful pitches on which most matches were played, taking 209 wickets for only 10.90 each, including 142 in 14 county matches. In the three Tests against Australia, Briggs, Bobby Peel and Billy Barnes did so well that Lohmann had to do little bowling at the Oval and Old Trafford. However, he took eight wickets at Lord's and made his only Test fifty at the Oval. In 1889, Lohmann again took over 200 wickets (115 for 1485 runs in purely county matches) and took nine wickets in an innings for the first time against Sussex.

== Early County Championship triumphs ==
In 1890, the County Championship was officially constituted for the first time after years of unofficial "champion" counties. (Note: Surrey had been acknowledged as the champion county since 1887) Lohmann continued to carry all before him in 1890, taking a career-best 220 wickets and being the leading wicket-taker outside of touring teams for the sixth successive season. (Note: This feat has been bettered only by Tich Freeman between 1928 and 1935) For Surrey in county cricket he totalled 113 wickets, and he again helped England to victory over Australia in the only Tests where cricket took place. In 1891, Lohmann was the leading English wicket-taker for the seventh successive year with 177 wickets as Surrey carried all before them in a wet summer, and on the following winter's Australian tour, he again bowled wonderfully well, taking eight for 58 on a dry wicket in Sydney.

In 1892, with Surrey still crushing all opposition in the County Championship race, Lohmann "suffered only by comparison with previous years". He surprisingly ceded the position of Surrey's chief bowler to the emergent William Lockwood who took full advantage of Oval pitches being extremely fiery and untrue due to reconditioning of the square, but it still seemed as though Lohmann had many years of county and Test cricket ahead of him. A rude shock to Surrey was to come, however.

== Illness and comeback ==
After the 1892 season had ended, a dreadful shock came when it was announced that Lohmann had contracted tuberculosis. In an effort to improve his health, he sailed during the 1892/1893 winter to Cape Town. Although at first it was hoped that he might return even when the 1893 season began, for two years his health did not at first improve and he could not play at all for Surrey in 1893 or 1894. In fact, he was not well enough to play any cricket until the 1894/1895 Currie Cup final where he turned out for Western Province.

By July 1895 Lohmann's health had recovered sufficiently for him to return to England and play for Surrey again. Fortuitously, his return coincided with a return to extremely treacherous wickets after a long spell of dry weather and much better pitches than he had ever bowled on before. Though completely overshadowed by Tom Richardson, the mere fact of missing the good wickets in May and June caused Lohmann to actually beat Richardson in the averages, though his batting (seen as an important part of his county cricket up to 1892) was completely insignificant.

== Record breaking feats ==
Completed Test career bowling averages (Note: Qualification: 10 wickets, career completed.)
Bowler	Average
Charles Marriott (ENG)	8.72
Frederick Martin (ENG)	10.07
George Lohmann (ENG)	10.75
Laurie Nash (AUS)	12.60
John Ferris (AUS/ENG)	12.70
Tom Horan (AUS)	13.00
Harry Dean (ENG)	13.90
Albert Trott (AUS/ENG)	15.00
Mike Procter (SA)	15.02
Jack Iverson (AUS)	15.23
Tom Kendall (AUS)	15.35
Alec Hurwood (AUS)	15.45
Billy Barnes (ENG)	15.54
John Trim (WI)	16.16
Billy Bates (ENG)	16.42

Returning to the British Cape Colony to maintain his health, Lohmann played no more first-class cricket until February, yet on the matting wickets in three "Tests" (the England eleven was no more than England "A" of today), Lohmann was so unplayable that he took 35 wickets for the remarkable average of just 5.80 runs each. During this series Lohmann twice broke the record for best average in Test cricket: he took 15 for 45 in the first Test, including a hat-trick (the fourth Test cricket hat-trick) at the end of the second innings to win the match; and after not being put on initially in the second Test, he became the first bowler to take nine wickets in a Test innings (a feat subsequently emulated only 14 times and surpassed only three times).

In 1896, Lohmann began to play for Surrey at the end of May, and, though he took 93 wickets and helped Richardson to put Australia out for 53 on a good wicket at Lord's, it was thought he had not come up to expectations. Indeed, on several occasions when pitches were suited to him, (Note: Notably against Middlesex at The Oval, Somerset at Taunton and Lancashire at Manchester) his bowling should have met with much greater success. Still, he had a fully satisfactory benefit in the game against Yorkshire in August.

A pay dispute, in which he demanded twice the existing 10-pound match fee given at the time to professional cricketers, caused Lohmann, along with Billy Gunn, to withdraw from the last Test match. He continued to play for Surrey that August, but at the end of the season his health again degenerated and had to return to South Africa, and a continuation of the 1896 pay dispute caused Lohmann to retire from his English career for good.

He is also the fastest Test bowler to reach 100 wickets, taking just 16 matches. Lohmann also holds the record for the most Test matches in a complete career (18) where a player bowled in both innings.

== Last days ==
Lohmann emigrated to the British Cape Colony permanently in 1897 and played a full season of first-class cricket for Western Province. In five matches on matting pitches during March 1897 he took 34 wickets for 12.26 runs each, but it was clear throughout that year that his health was unlikely to recover, and he was able to play only one further first-class match for "A Bailey's Transvaal XI".

Lohmann did come back to England in 1901 to manage the second South African touring team (and the first whose matches were recognised as first-class). However, his health was clearly never going to recover completely, and even after returning to Cape Town with the onset of autumn in England, Lohmann's condition only became more critical. On 1 December 1901, the tuberculosis he had fought against for nine years finally claimed his life at age 36. He was buried at Matjiesfontein.

== Awards ==
- Wisden Cricketer of the Year in 1889 (actually titled Six Great Bowlers of the Year).
