= Ted Wainwright =

English cricketer

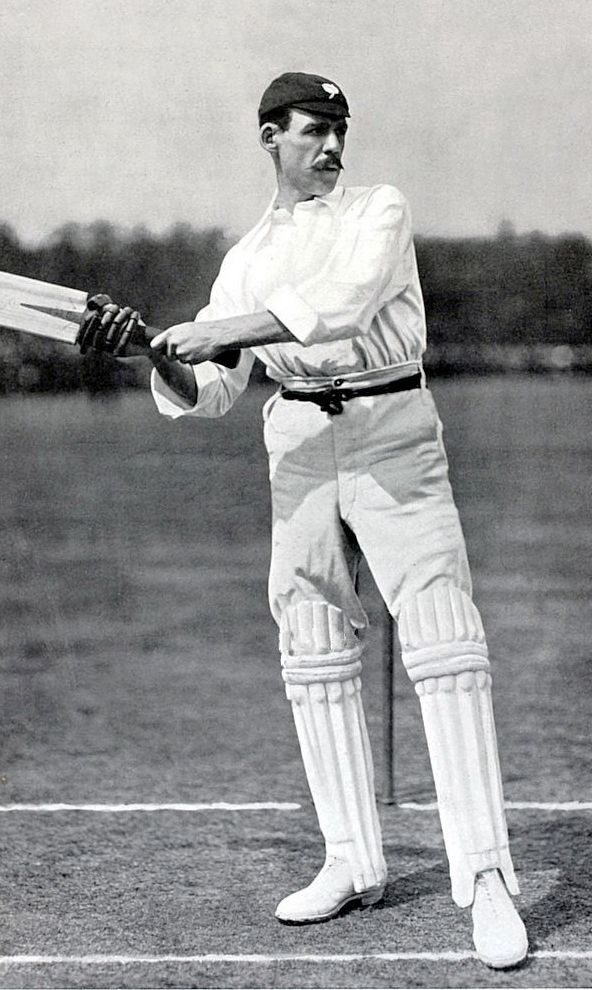
- Wainwright in about 1900

Personal information
- Full name: Edward Wainwright
- Born: 8 April 1865; Tinsley, Sheffield, Yorkshire
- Died: 28 October 1919 (aged 54); Sheffield, Yorkshire
- Batting: Right-handed
- Bowling: Right-arm slow

International information
- National side: England
- Test debut: 17 July 1893 v Australia
- Last Test: 2 March 1898 v Australia

Career statistics
Competition	Test	First-class
Matches	5	391
Runs scored	132	12,513
Batting average	14.66	21.76
100s/50s	0/0	19/48
Top score	49	228
Balls bowled	127	46,636
Wickets	0	1,071
Bowling average	–	18.24
5 wickets in innings	–	63
10 wickets in match	–	15
Best bowling	–	9/66
Catches/stumpings	2/–	353/–
- Source: CricInfo, 20 August 2021

Edward Wainwright (8 April 1865 – 28 October 1919) was an English first-class cricketer, who played in 352 first-class matches for Yorkshire County Cricket Club between 1888 and 1902. An all-rounder, Wainwright helped to establish the county at the top under Lord Hawke's captaincy, during the early years of County Championship cricket. He also appeared in five Test matches for England, although without any real international success.

== Life and career ==
Edward Wainwright was born in Tinsley, Sheffield, Yorkshire, England.

Wainwright will be remembered for gaining the lowest bowling average in the history of the County Championship – 10.17 for 97 wickets in 1894, a summer of many sticky wickets. On these wickets, he would bowl a perfect length and his spin was such that the ball, "popping" from the crust of the turf, would gain pace so that not even the most technically correct batsman could hope to survive. However, Wainwright never had any sting on hard pitches. He did not take a single wicket in his five Test matches against Australia. Wainwright featured in four of the five Tests on Stoddart's 1897/98 tour of Australia, but found, not long into the visit, that his off spin was declining to turn. By the conclusion of the tour, Wainwright became convinced of his having lost the facility. When he arrived back in Yorkshire, Wainwright went straight to the nets and noted that the ball immediately started to spin in the manner to which he had been accustomed.

A better batsman than bowler, Wainwright suffered from inconsistency, but on his day could play brilliant innings characterised by powerful hitting. Among the best was his 116 which won the match against Kent in 1900. In fielding, Wainwright excelled as a close catcher; along with John Tunnicliffe he gave vital support to Yorkshire's powerful bowling attacks, holding forty two catches in 1895.

Wainwright first played for Yorkshire in 1888, and immediately established his place in the side, chiefly through an innings of 105 against the Australians. He developed slowly over the next couple of years, but his performance on a sticky wicket at Sheffield in 1891 was the performance that established Wainwright as a deadly soft-wicket bowler. Wainwright showed no advancement as a batsman until 1893, when he got close to doing the double and played his first Test at Lord's without success. Wainwright was Yorkshire's leading wicket-taker in 1892, though they fared only modestly, and in 1893, aided by some bad wickets due to a dry spring, he took 90 wickets for 12.55 each, to help Yorkshire win its first Championship. By this time, he and Bobby Peel were the finest slow bowling partnership in county cricket, and they were often unplayable when the wicket helped them.

In 1894, against Sussex, Wainwright took five wickets in seven deliveries and finished with figures of seven for twenty (thirteen for 38 for the match). Against Middlesex, he took ten for 63, and against Surrey twelve for 108. However, his harmlessness on the best pitch of the season at The Oval made sure that he was not chosen for The Ashes tour that winter. 1895 was disappointing as a batsman and bowler, but his fielding made him a vital member of Yorkshire's eleven. In the dry summer of 1896, he recaptured his ability to exploit the few sticky wickets, and got closer to a thousand runs than ever before.

In 1897, though expensive as a bowler, Wainwright hit five centuries and was named for the 1897/1898 Ashes tour in that capacity. However, he again did not perform well in the Tests. 1899 saw Wainwright again of little use as a bowler once the harder pitches came in June, but he played a career-best 228 at the Oval and scored almost as many runs as in 1897. With Rhodes and Haigh now Yorkshire's destroyers on sticky wickets, Wainwright did little bowling in 1900 and 1901 – his last two seasons – but his batting, though inconsistent, remained highly valuable as a last resort.

Following his retirement, he went to work as a professional at Shrewsbury School and worked with Neville Cardus as his assistant.

== Death ==
Wainwright died in Sheffield in October 1919, at the age of 54.
