= Bill Lockwood (cricketer) =

English cricketer

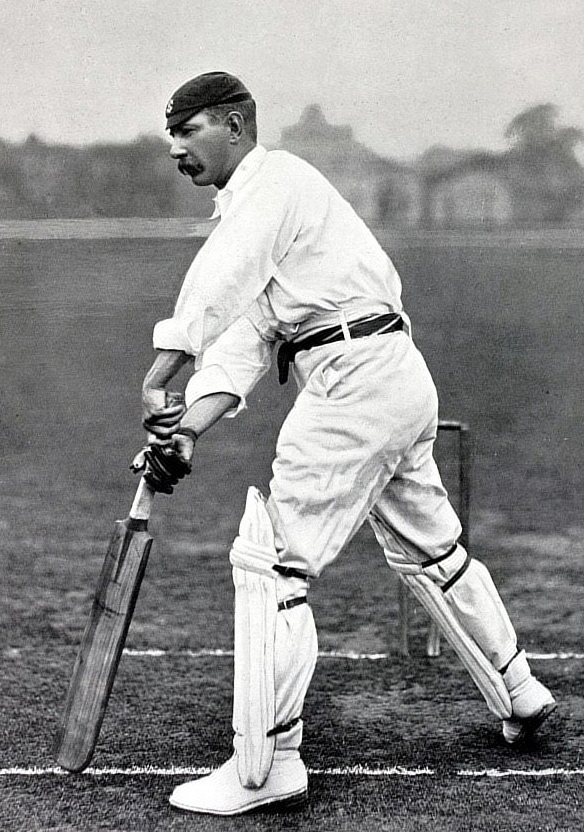
- Lockwood in about 1900

Personal information
- Full name: William Henry Lockwood
- Born: 25 March 1868; Radford, Nottingham
- Died: 26 April 1932 (aged 64); Radford, Nottingham
- Batting: Right-handed
- Bowling: Right-arm fast
- Role: Bowler

International information
- National side: England
- Test debut: 17 July 1893 v Australia
- Last Test: 13 August 1902 v Australia

Career statistics
Competition	Tests	First-class
Matches	12	363
Runs scored	231	10,673
Batting average	17.76	21.96
100s/50s	0/1	15/48
Top score	52*	165
Balls bowled	1,973	52,121
Wickets	43	1,376
Bowling average	20.53	18.34
5 wickets in innings	5	121
10 wickets in match	1	29
Best bowling	7/71	9/59
Catches/stumpings	4/0	140/0
- Source: CricketArchive, 7 January 2013

William Henry Lockwood (25 March 1868 – 26 April 1932) was an English Test cricketer, best known as a fast bowler and the unpredictable, occasionally devastating counterpart to the amazingly hard-working Tom Richardson for Surrey in the early County Championship. A capable enough batsman against weaker bowling sides who scored over 10,000 runs in first-class cricket, stronger bowling tended to show flaws in his technique.

In contrast to Richardson's consistency and strenuous work, Lockwood was never capable of long bowling spells. He bowled off a much shorter run than Richardson and tended to come down very heavily in his delivery stride. Lockwood could break back, though rarely as sharply as Richardson, but what really set Lockwood apart was his unpredictability, with extremely subtle variations of pace and pitch characterising his bowling. Frequently Lockwood would deliver a slow ball without change of action and the batsman would claim they never expected it.

== Early days as a batsman ==
Lockwood first played first-class cricket as a batsman for his native county, Nottinghamshire, in 1886. He played five matches for the county (prior to the official County Championship) in 1886 and 1887, but met with no success and only bowled much on one occasion against the Australians. Because Surrey apparently saw considerable potential in him, Lockwood spent two years qualifying by residence. He began to play for Surrey in 1889 and immediately showed that Surrey's belief in his ability as a batsman was justified, scoring a then-highly respectable 384 runs in 1889 and in 1890 he averaged 24 for over 500 runs, in the process scoring a maiden first-class hundred against Yorkshire at the Oval (ironically Surrey lost the match).

== Rapid development into a top-flight bowler ==
In his first two years for Surrey, with George Lohmann and John Sharpe doing all that was required, Lockwood was regarded as little more than a capable batsman. However, with some support bowling wanted as Sharpe began a sudden decline, Surrey turned to Lockwood and on the treacherous wickets of August 1891 he proved quite irresistible. His 7 for 19 against Kent was seen as the most difficult bowling of the year by Wisden.

In the following two years the pitches at The Oval were exceedingly fiery and gave Lockwood a lot of help. In 1892, he was regarded as the most difficult bowler of the year and took a career-high 151 wickets. The following year, he proved his class as a bowler with 9 for 126 for Lord Sheffield's XI against the Australians in May, and 8 for 33 against Cambridge University to give Surrey a surprise win. After taking twenty-one wickets in two games on firm pitches against Yorkshire and Sussex, Lockwood played his first Test at Lord's and took an impressive six for 101. He followed this up with eight for 133 in two innings of the second Test, but injury ruled him out of the last.

In 1894 Lockwood and Richardson, with their pace and sharp break-back, were an irresistible combination on the many treacherous wickets. Lockwood's bowling reached its highest point, though, against Yorkshire at the Oval when Richardson was injured: he took 7 for 94 on a very true pitch to win the match that decided the Championship. Lockwood's batting did not suffer from the advance of his bowling: indeed he frequently opened with Bobby Abel in 1894 and scored over 900 runs under the most difficult conditions. After demolishing Kent on a perfect batting wicket in the last match at The Oval, he and Richardson were chosen to tour Australia.

== Further career ==
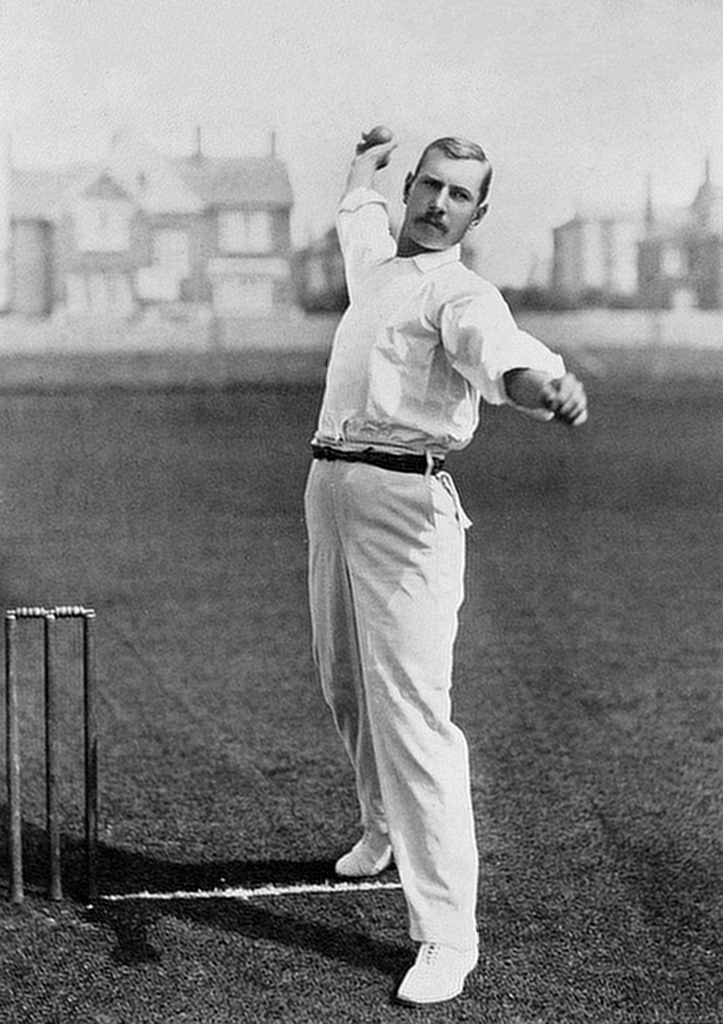
Bill Lockwood

Whilst Richardson's superb work won England a difficult series in 1894/1895, Lockwood was a complete failure, being utterly unable to come to grips with the workload required under Australian conditions of pitch and climate. In fact, Lockwood never took more than one wicket in any Test innings that season, and his highest score was only 33. Lockwood also had several escapes from major accidents: he narrowly escaped both drowning and losing an arm, and when he returned to England his wife and a child both died. Lockwood, in despair, turned to drinking alcohol prodigiously, and his weight increased severely, reducing his effectiveness very quickly.

In 1895 and 1896, it was clear that Lockwood's failure in Australia was due to more than different conditions: his physical condition was clearly very poor and his weight was far too great for him to sustain first-class cricket. Only on rare occasions (for example, against Gloucestershire at the Oval in 1895) did his bowling have the sting of previous years, and apart from one innings of 158 against Warwickshire, his batting was disappointing. Lockwood was frequently dropped from the Surrey eleven, and after failing in early 1897 he was never recalled and it looked as though has career was over.

== Revival ==
However, in 1898 Lockwood, having married again and slimmed considerably, began an amazing revival, with his pace and break being as good as ever. When Richardson returned to form, the two could form an amazing pair, and against Yorkshire at the Oval their wonderful bowling allowed Surrey to inflict an all-time record defeat, something they gave to Kent a week later. With the bat, Lockwood was also back in form and hit three centuries. The following year, Lockwood was plagued by injury, but in at least three matches he bowled better than ever (notably when recalled for the last Test at the Oval). He also reached a thousand runs for the first time, which he repeated in 1900, when despite some inconsistencies, he was still clearly the best bowler on a good pitch when at his best. In 1901 Lockwood had a benefit match washed out by rain and played after the normal cricket season had ended. His cricket, too was disappointing, though this was largely due to injury wiping out more than a quarter of his season.

The dreadfully wet summer of 1902 restricted Lockwood's opportunities. However, his bowling in the thrilling last two Tests was remarkable: 11 for 76 at Old Trafford and 5 for 45 in the second innings at the Oval, whilst his wonderful 8 for 25 on a wearing wicket at Lord's showed "his fast ball coming back to telling effect" (The Times).

== Last years ==
1903 was another summer totally against fast bowlers, and Lockwood bowled very little in many matches. Moreover, he rarely bowled at anything like his old pace and by August he was generally no more than medium pace. Nonetheless, he still did some superb work, most especially his 8 for 110 against Middlesex at Lord's. In 1904, Lockwood bowled very well early in the year against Derbyshire, but after that, despite hard pitches emerging, his form (along with Richardson) declined so much that Surrey dropped him before the season was half over.

He retired at the end of the year, and for the rest of his life moved back to his native Nottinghamshire.
