= Johnny Briggs (cricketer) =

English cricketer (1862–1902)

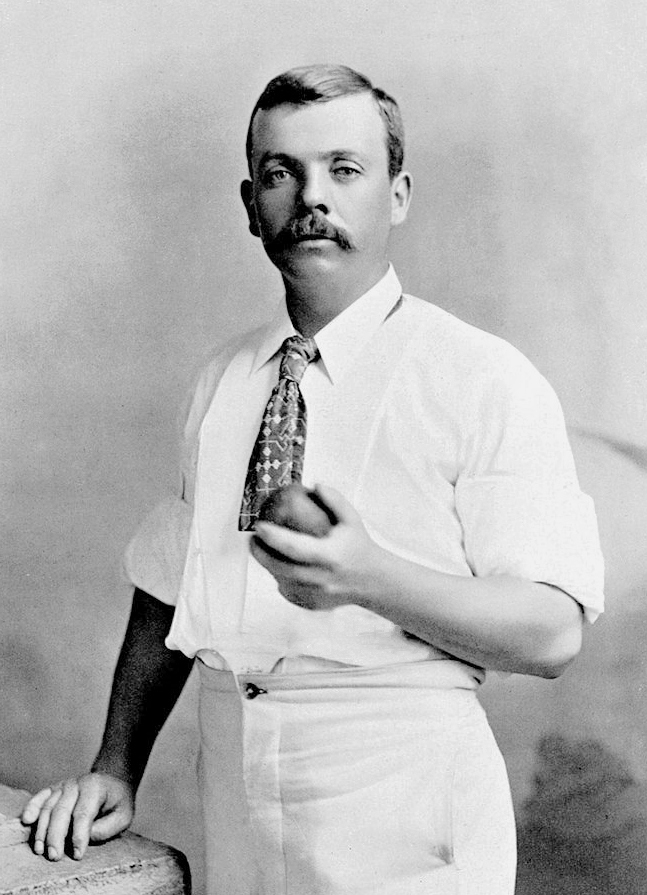
- Briggs in about 1895

Personal information
- Full name: Johnny Briggs
- Born: 3 October 1862; Sutton-in-Ashfield, Nottinghamshire, England
- Died: 11 January 1902 (aged 39); Heald Green, Cheadle, Cheshire, England
- Batting: Right-handed
- Bowling: Slow left-arm orthodox
- Role: Bowler
- Relatives: Joseph Briggs (brother)

International information
- National side: England (1884–1899)
- Test debut (cap 47): 12 December 1884 v Australia
- Last Test: 29 June 1899 v Australia

Domestic team information
- Years: Team
- 1879–1900: Lancashire
- 1882–1884: Liverpool and District
- 1883–1898: The Rest
- 1884–1900: North of England
- 1884–1896: Players

Career statistics
Competition	Test	First-class
Matches	33	535
Runs scored	815	14,092
Batting average	18.11	18.27
100s/50s	1/2	10/58
Top score	121	186
Balls bowled	5,332	100,144
Wickets	118	2,221
Bowling average	17.75	15.95
5 wickets in innings	9	200
10 wickets in match	4	52
Best bowling	8/11	10/55
Catches/stumpings	12/–	258/–
- Source: ESPNcricinfo, 17 May 2017

Johnny Briggs (3 October 1862 – 11 January 1902) was an English left arm spin bowler who played for Lancashire County Cricket Club between 1879 and 1900 and remains the second-highest wicket-taker in the county's history after Brian Statham. In the early days of Test cricket, Briggs‘ batting was considered careless, although still very useful. He was the first bowler in Test cricket to take 100 wickets, and held the record of most wickets in Test cricket on two occasions, the first in 1895 and again from 1898 until 1904, when he was succeeded by Hugh Trumble. He toured Australia a record six times, a feat only equalled by Colin Cowdrey.

Briggs was a notably short man at about five feet five or 165 centimetres. Briggs's skill lay in his ability to vary the flight and pace of the ball as well as in achieving prodigious spin on the primitive nineteenth century pitches. As a batsman, Briggs was capable of hitting very effectively, but as time went by an eagerness to punish every ball set in and led to a decline.

== Life ==
Briggs was born in Sutton-in-Ashfield, Nottinghamshire, the son of a professional club cricketer. He first played as a sub pro at the age of 13 (at Hornsea in Yorkshire). His father James played cricket and rugby for various teams and took his wife and five children around the north of England until he settled down as a pub landlord near Widnes. The 1881 census suggests James kept the Cross Keys at Appleton village.

Rugby was an amateur game at this time. James and later Johnny played rugby for Widnes but supported themselves through professional cricket. James became cricket professional at Widnes in 1877.

Johnny remained with Hornsea until the end of the 1877 season, when he was not retained, and migrated to Lancashire. His next professional appointment was at the Northern Cricket Club in 1878. He was retained by Northern for the 1879 season, during which he was called up by Lancashire to make his county debut against Nottinghamshire in late May.

Briggs played five times for Lancashire in 1879, and established himself as a regular player by 1882 despite hardly bowling at all and doing little of significance with the bat. He was however a famous fielder at cover. In 1883 and 1884 his batting improved so much that he was chosen to tour Australia with Alfred Shaw’s team and played in all the Test matches, scoring an impressive 121 in Melbourne.

In 1885, Briggs developed greatly as a bowler: having scarcely bowled at all in previous seasons, he took 67 wickets for 13.74 each, and in 1886, his bowling helped England achieve a 3–0 clean sweep of the series, their last whitewash victory in a series of three or more Tests in the Ashes until 1977. His batting did not suffer: Briggs hit a career-best 186 against Surrey at Liverpool – adding a then-record 173 for the tenth wicket with Dick Pilling. In the exceptionally dry summer of 1887, Briggs took 100 wickets in a season for the first time, whilst in the summer of 1888 he was consistently deadly on the treacherous pitches. His 160 wickets cost only 10.49 each, and the following year he was a Wisden Cricketer of the Year. He played well in South Africa’s first two Test matches in 1888/9 (only canonised as such much later), taking 15 for 28 in the second Test, of which fourteen were clean bowled.

For Lancashire and England, Briggs shouldered an incredible burden. For Lancashire, as a professional or “player” in a team largely made up of “gentleman” amateurs he was expected to open the bowling and sometimes to bowl all day in tandem with the other professionals; Barlow, Crossland, Mold. He toured Australia five times and went to South Africa, experiencing very high temperatures. Professional cricketers were expected to play through injuries – if they didn't play, they would not be paid. His health suffered even before his major injury and last illness.

Briggs bowled the third ever hat-trick in Test Cricket. It happened at Sydney in 1892 when he finished off the Australian second innings.

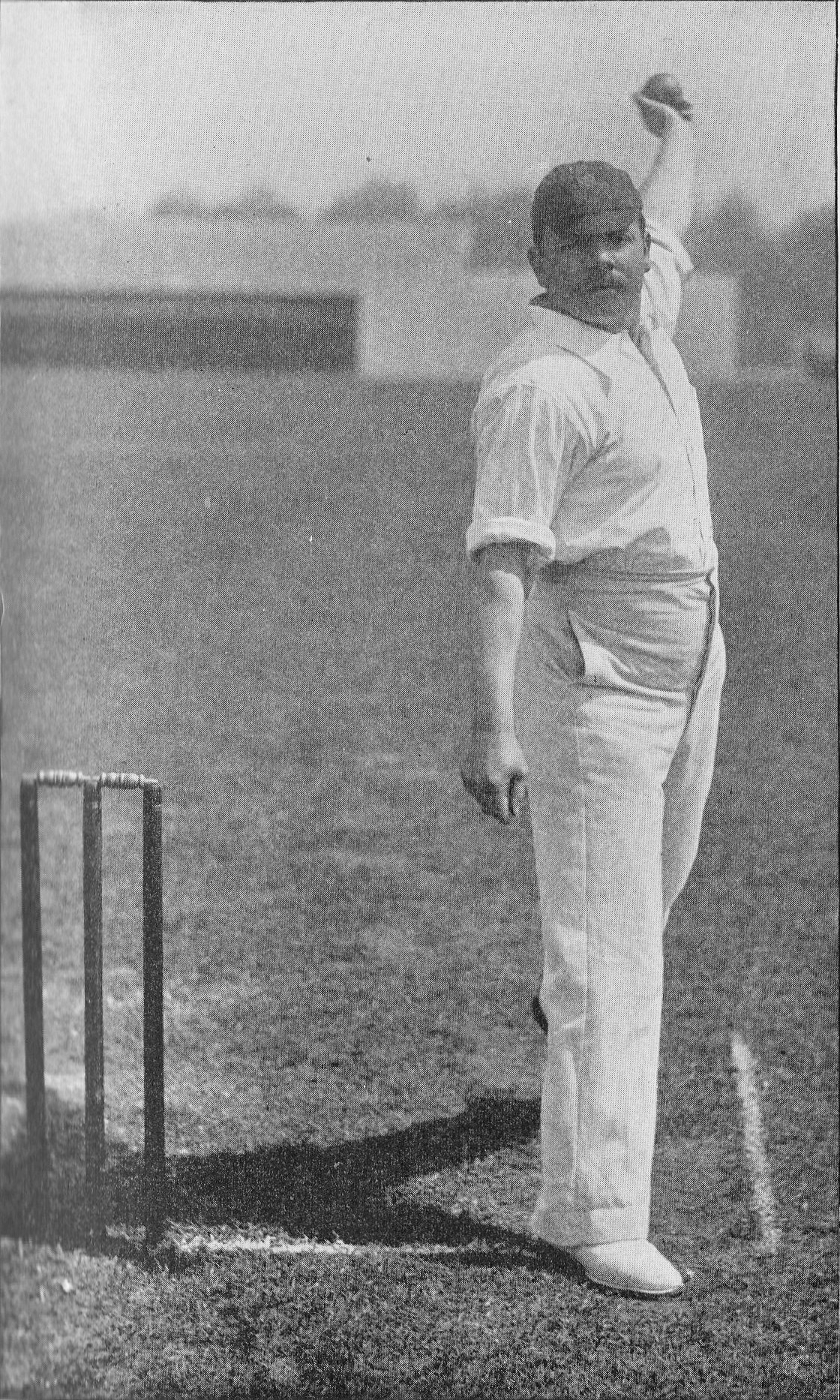
Briggs bowling

In the First Test at Sydney in 1894/95 he played a part in the first time a team won after following on. Australia scored a massive 586 on a relatively poor pitch – partly because of England's wicket keeper dropping some important chances. When England batted they struggled to 325 only because Briggs at No.8 scored 57. They were asked to follow on. This time they batted well on a wearing pitch, Lancashire's Albert Ward scored a hundred and Johnny Briggs made 42. Australia only needed 177 to win and made it to 117 for 2 by close of play. Some of the England players had given the match up. Peel, the other spinner in the side got very drunk. Overnight however it rained and in the morning the sun was shining. A wet wicket drying under a hot sun would soon become a sticky wicket. Peel was put under a shower to sober up. He and Briggs were unplayable and the match was won by 10 runs. In the Second Test at Melbourne Briggs equalled Fred Spofforth’s record of 94 Test wickets on 29 December 1894, as did Charles Turner two days later. The three men briefly held the record together, but Turner missed the Third Test at Adelaide and Briggs overtook them both. Briggs became the first man to claim 100 Test wickets in the Fourth Test at Sydney on 1 February 1895, Turner being the second on 4 February in his last Test match.

With the controversial speedster Arthur Mold, Briggs formed a strong bowling combination for Lancashire from 1889 onwards: both bowlers took over 100 wickets every year from 1889 to 1896, frequently bowling almost unchanged through an innings and keeping Lancashire near the top of the Championship table despite poor performance from support bowlers. His batting remained useful until 1894, after which his impatience tended to get the better of him and, despite rapidly improving pitches, he played few significant innings in his later years. CB Fry described his trademark shot as a “whizzing uppercut that travels over third man’s head”, a thoroughly modern sounding stroke. Nonetheless, Briggs's superb bowling — though aided by a number of sticky wickets — won Lancashire their first official County Championship in 1897, but he was a disappointment in Australia the following winter and suffered a severe decline in his bowling the following year.

In 1899, Briggs was still thought good enough to play for England at Headingley, but before that he had suffered a blow over the heart from Tom Hayward. Though this injury was not thought severe, Briggs collapsed during the match and did not play for the rest of the season. He was one of the first patients to receive an X Ray examination and it was found that a rib had damaged his heart.

In 1900, he made a comeback, taking all ten wickets for 55 against Worcestershire and scoring over 800 runs, but soon afterwards it became clear he was suffering severely from mental illness. Confined to an asylum, Briggs never recovered and died early in 1902 at the age of 39.

Briggs' sporting career was not limited to cricket. He also played hockey for Manchester. Between 1878 and 1882 he played for Widnes Rugby Football Club, playing the position of fullback (standing at 5 ft 4 ins tall). Many people remarked on his sharp and athletic fielding in cricket and it was probably due to the skills and fitness that he gained during his stint with Widnes. In 1882 a broken arm made him think about retirement from rugby. He carried on playing for Widnes occasionally until 1884 after which time his cricket career blossomed.

Briggs competed with Yorkshireman Bobby Peel for the left-arm spinner's position in the England Test side, and accomplished more fine performances at Test level, notably at Adelaide in 1891/1892 and at The Oval in 1893. There was a much remarked upon contrast between the two. Briggs was chirpy, hard working and much loved. Peel was a dissolute dipsomaniac who eventually left the game after embarrassing himself.

CB Fry wrote of Briggs,

‘This little animal is round and smiles, it bowls and bowls and bowls and it always gets wickets.’ Of course no one would call Johnny a beast, not even a disappointed batsman. Why, he beams upon you before and after your innings. The shorter your innings the happier he is towards you. He passes you a cheery time of day. He inquires with feeling about your health and form. He rubs the ball in the dust, takes two steps and serves you a fast yorker instead of the high tossed slow you expected. You retire, he smiles. What could be pleasanter?

In June 1899, Briggs had an epileptic seizure. He died on 11 January 1902 at Cheadle Royal Hospital.

== Other sources ==
- "Johnny Briggs" (1902) by Herbert Turner
- "Giants of the Game" (1901) by Lyttleton, Ford, Fry, Giffen
- Howat, Gerald M. D. "Briggs, John (1862–1902)". Oxford Dictionary of National Biography (online ed.). Oxford University Press. doi:10.1093/ref:odnb/32070. (Subscription, Wikipedia Library access or UK public library membership required.)

Records
Preceded by Fred Spofforth	World Record – Most Career Wickets in Test cricket 118 wickets (17.75) in 33 Tests; Held record 12 January 1895 to 2 January 1904	Succeeded by Hugh Trumble
