= Albert Ward (cricketer, born 1865) =

English cricketer

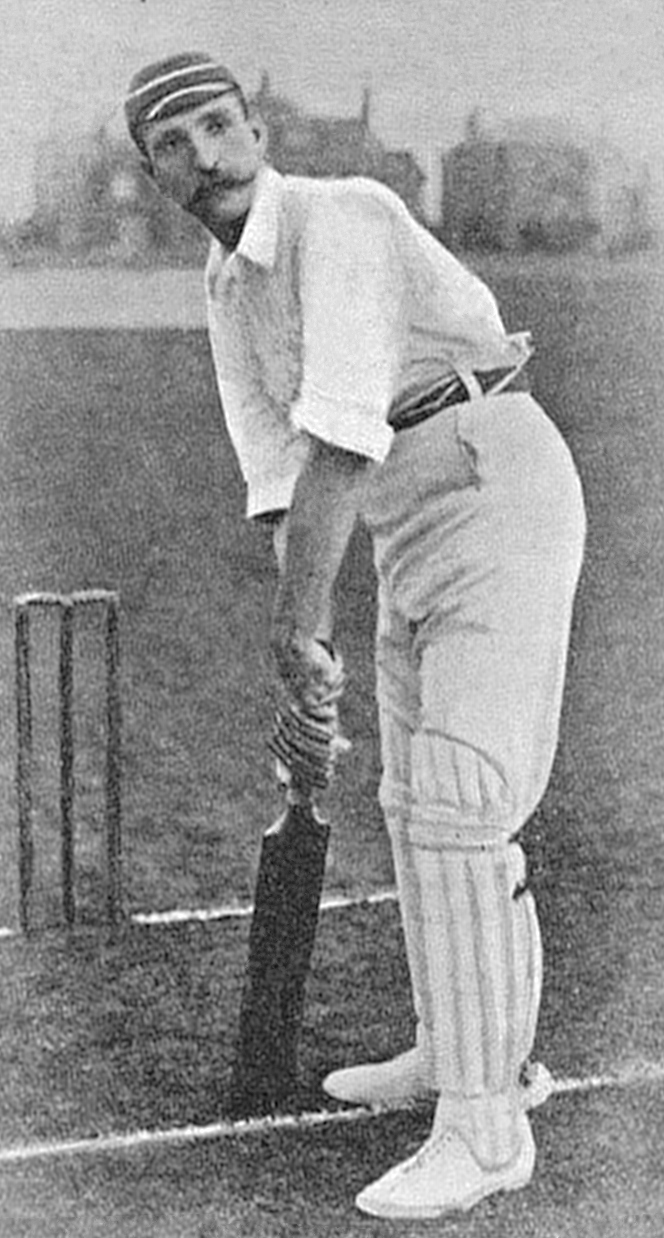

Personal information
- Full name: Albert Ward
- Born: 21 November 1865; Leeds, Yorkshire, England
- Died: 6 January 1939 (aged 73); Heaton, Bolton, Lancashire, England
- Batting: Right-handed
- Bowling: Right-arm slow

International information
- National side: England
- Test debut: 14 August 1893 v Australia
- Last Test: 6 May 1895 v Australia

Career statistics
Competition	Test	First-class
Matches	7	385
Runs scored	487	17,783
Batting average	37.46	30.08
100s/50s	1/3	29/87
Top score	117	219
Balls bowled	–	5,036
Wickets	–	71
Bowling average	–	34.83
5 wickets in innings	–	4
10 wickets in match	–	0
Best bowling	–	6/29
Catches/stumpings	0/–	172/–
- Source: CricketArchive, 30 December 2021

Albert Ward (21 November 1865 – 6 January 1939) was an English first-class cricketer, who played first-class cricket for Yorkshire County Cricket Club in 1886, and for Lancashire between 1889 and 1904. Ward also played seven Test matches for England, and was named as one of the Wisden Cricketers of the Year in 1890.

Ward, the son of a coal miner, was born in the colliers village of Waterloo near Rothwell, Leeds, Yorkshire, England. He played four matches for Yorkshire, and his debut was against Middlesex at Bradford Park Avenue in 1886, where he made his highest score of 22. He was not able to sustain a place in the Yorkshire side but, after moving to live in Lancashire, he began a successful career for that county. In total, he played 330 matches between 1889 and 1904, with his benefit match in 1902 being worth £1,739. He was the first professional to score 1,000 runs in a single season for Lancashire and repeated this eight times. The best being in 1900, when he scored 1,511 at average of 37.77. During his career, he played in seven Tests for England against Australia. Ward's highest first-class score was 219 for the Stoddart team against South Australia, at Adelaide in 1895. His highest Test score was 117 versus Australia, made in Sydney in 1894.

He was an opening batsman with a powerful defence, who drove the ball hard, but preferred to play defensive roles. He was also a good outfielder.

A school teacher by profession, Ward also owned a sports outfitters shop in Bolton at one time. His early cricket was with Hunslet C.C.and he was known as the 'Rothwell Colt' in his early career.

Ward died in Heaton, Bolton, Lancashire, England.
