= Arthur Mold =

English cricketer (1863–1921)

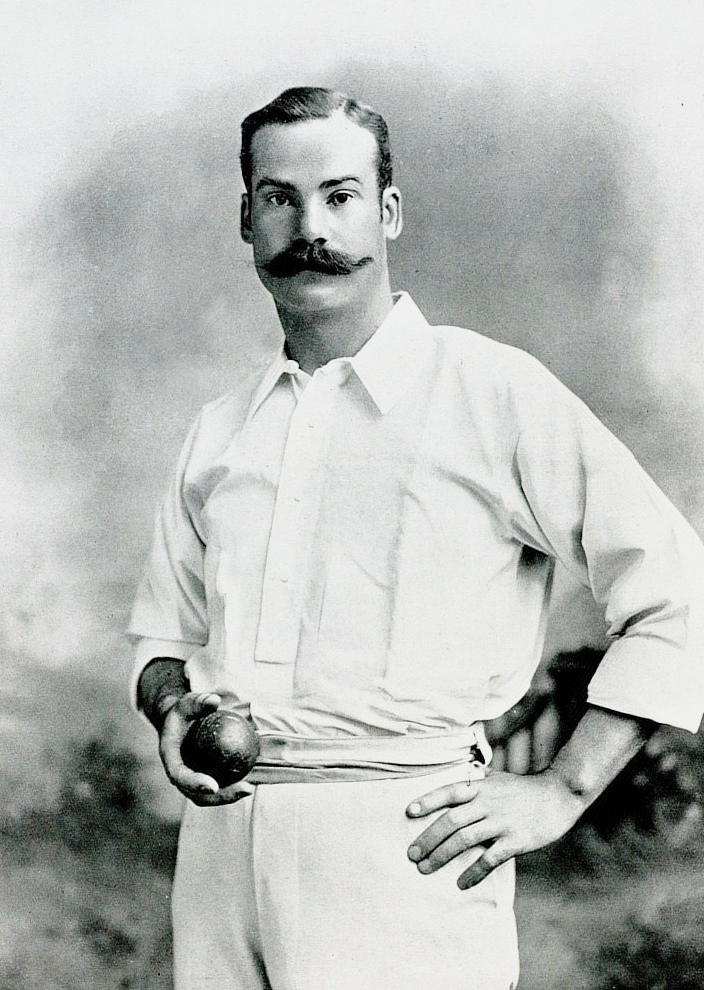
- Mold in about 1895

Personal information
- Full name: Arthur Webb Mold
- Born: 27 May 1863; Middleton Cheney, Northamptonshire, England
- Died: 29 April 1921 (aged 57); Middleton Cheney, Northamptonshire, England
- Batting: Right-handed
- Bowling: Right-arm fast

International information
- National side: England
- Test debut (cap 84): 17 July 1893 v Australia
- Last Test: 26 August 1893 v Australia

Domestic team information
- Years: Team
- 1889–1901: Lancashire

Career statistics
Competition	Tests	First-class
Matches	3	287
Runs scored	0	1,850
Batting average	0.00	7.14
100s/50s	0/0	0/2
Top score	0*	57
Balls bowled	491	62,278
Wickets	7	1,673
Bowling average	33.42	15.54
5 wickets in innings	0	152
10 wickets in match	0	56
Best bowling	3/44	9/29
Catches/stumpings	1/–	111/–
- Source: ESPNCricinfo, 25 September 2011

Arthur Webb Mold (27 May 1863 – 29 April 1921) was an English professional cricketer who played first-class cricket for Lancashire as a fast bowler between 1889 and 1901. A Wisden Cricketer of the Year in 1892, he was selected for England in three Test matches in 1893. Mold was one of the most effective bowlers in England during the 1890s but his career was overshadowed by controversy over his bowling action. Although he took 1,673 wickets in first-class matches, many commentators viewed his achievements as tainted.

Mold began his professional cricket career playing for Banbury and Northamptonshire in the mid-1880s, but by 1889 had qualified to play for Lancashire at county level. Immediately successful, he quickly established a good bowling partnership with Johnny Briggs and became one of the leading bowlers in the country. However, he only achieved selection for England in one series in 1893. Many critics thought he threw rather than bowled the ball, and he was among several bowlers at the time about whom there were similar suspicions. Controversy erupted in 1900 when Mold was no-balled for throwing by Jim Phillips, an umpire who had targeted several prominent bowlers with dubious bowling actions. After Mold avoided several games in which Phillips was umpire, the affair came to a head in 1901. On the opening morning of a match, Phillips repeatedly no-balled Mold. Several of Mold's teammates and most Lancashire supporters continued to believe that Mold bowled legally, but his reputation was ruined and, after three more appearances in 1901, he retired at the end of the season. After his departure from the game, throwing ceased to be a concern in English cricket for 50 years.

== Early life and career ==
Mold was born on 27 May 1863 in the village of Middleton Cheney in Northamptonshire. His family had links with the thatching trade, but Mold pursued a career in professional cricket. He began to play for the village team, making good progress as a bowler; in 1882, Middleton Cheney were unbeaten and Mold had the best bowling average in the team. In 1885 and 1886, he was employed as a professional at Banbury Cricket Club. In his second year, a successful match against the Free Foresters, an amateur team, impressed two Lancashire cricketers who played against him. Subsequently, in 1887, Mold was employed by Manchester Cricket Club, and played a few non-competitive cricket matches for Lancashire. In the same season, Northamptonshire, which at the time had not been awarded first-class status, asked Mold to play for them. Playing as a professional, Mold was immediately successful, taking ten wickets in a match against a team from Surrey and seven wickets for 22 runs in an innings against Staffordshire. He continued to represent Northamptonshire in the following season but hoped to play for Lancashire. At the time, cricketers who wished to play competitive first-class matches for a county in which they were not born had to live there for two years to qualify.

By 1889, Mold was qualified for Lancashire and was expected by critics to make an impact. At the time, Lancashire had no fast bowler in their team, making Mold potentially an important player. He made his first-class debut for the county in a three-day match against Marylebone Cricket Club (MCC) starting on 9 May 1889, taking one wicket in a drawn game. Throughout the rest of the season, Mold impressed critics. After a slow start in unhelpful conditions and unsuitable playing surfaces for his type of bowling, he took a total of 33 wickets in four consecutive games and established a reputation as the fastest bowler in England. His best performance statistically was seven for 35 against Yorkshire County Cricket Club, in a match during which he took 13 wickets, but he was successful in other high-profile matches. In all games against county opposition, Mold took 80 wickets at an average of 11.69; in all first-class matches he took 102 wickets at an average of 11.81. This placed him third in the national bowling averages. Although less successful in 1890, he took 118 wickets in first-class games at 14.72, which was 11th in the averages. His best figures, nine for 41, once more came against Yorkshire, and he helped Lancashire to second place in the first official County Championship. Mold came close to playing for England when he was included in the squad to play in the third Test match against Australia, but the match was abandoned owing to rain and no play took place.

== Leading bowler ==
Mold established himself as one of the leading bowlers in England during 1891. According to Wisden Cricketers' Almanack, "The season of 1891 brought him a great increase of reputation, and all through the summer he was uniformly successful." In all first-class matches, he took 138 wickets at 12.49 to finish second in the national bowling averages. As a result of his good performances in the season, he was chosen as one of the Wisden Cricketers of the Year. (Note: The title of "Cricketer of the Year" was not used in the first few years of the award. Mold was a "Bowler of the Year", but this is included in the list of "Cricketers of the Year".) Lancashire finished as runners-up once again in the County Championship.

In 1892, Mold's aggregate of wickets fell to 120 at an average of 13.63, but he returned the best bowling figures of his career when he took nine for 29 against Kent. He was chosen in a representative match for the first time, (Note: A representative match in cricket means one in which one or both teams are composed of those regarded as representing the best players in a region or group (such as professional cricketers), or one involving national teams.) playing for the North against the South. (Note: This was a match in which a team of players from the northern English counties played against a team selected from the southern counties.) During the 1893 season, Mold took 166 wickets at 16.96; at the end of the season, The Times described him as a great bowler and noted that he and Johnny Briggs were Lancashire's only two effective bowlers. Between them, the pair took 225 wickets; the other bowlers in combination took 46. Once more representing the North during 1893, this time in a match against the touring Australian team, Mold also made his debut in the prestigious Gentlemen v Players match, playing for the professional "Players" and taking nine wickets in the game. His performances brought about his international debut; he played for England in all three Test matches against Australia, the only such appearances of his career. In the first game, he took three for 44 in Australia's only innings, his best figures of the series, and took four wickets in the other two matches to finish with seven wickets at an average of 33.42. It is likely that doubts about the legality of his bowling action prevented him from playing further Test matches, or touring Australia with a representative team. However, other factors may have played a part in his subsequent omission, including the emergence of Tom Richardson as a successful fast bowler, and the opinion that Mold's bowling was flattered by the difficult, uneven pitches on which Lancashire played their home games.

Mold's annual total of wickets continued to increase in the following seasons. In 1894, he again represented the North and the Players, taking 207 wickets in total at an average of 12.30. But as Lancashire increased the number of games they played, Mold and Briggs had an increased bowling workload and once more had little assistance from other bowlers. Between them, they took 324 wickets while the next most successful bowler took 13. The following year, Mold reached his highest seasonal tally with 213 wickets at 15.96, and made his final appearance for the Players. The Times commented on the effectiveness of Mold: "Mold preserves all his pace and break in bowling, and his success on the hard wickets was phenomenal."

Although Mold appeared for the North against the Australians, who toured again in 1896, he did not play any Tests or other representative cricket that year and his wicket total fell to 150 at 18.12; after this season, his bowling began to decline in effectiveness. Suffering frequently from injury in 1897, Mold failed to reach 100 wickets in the season for the first time. His 90 wickets in 1898 were taken at an average over 20, the only time his bowling average was so high, and he missed three weeks of the season owing to injury. After improving his record to 115 wickets at 18.68 during 1899, he was awarded a benefit match by Lancashire during 1900 which raised £2,050, a record total at the time and worth around £173,000 in 2010. (Note: Using the Retail Price Index. Other calculating methods can also be used.)

== Throwing controversy ==
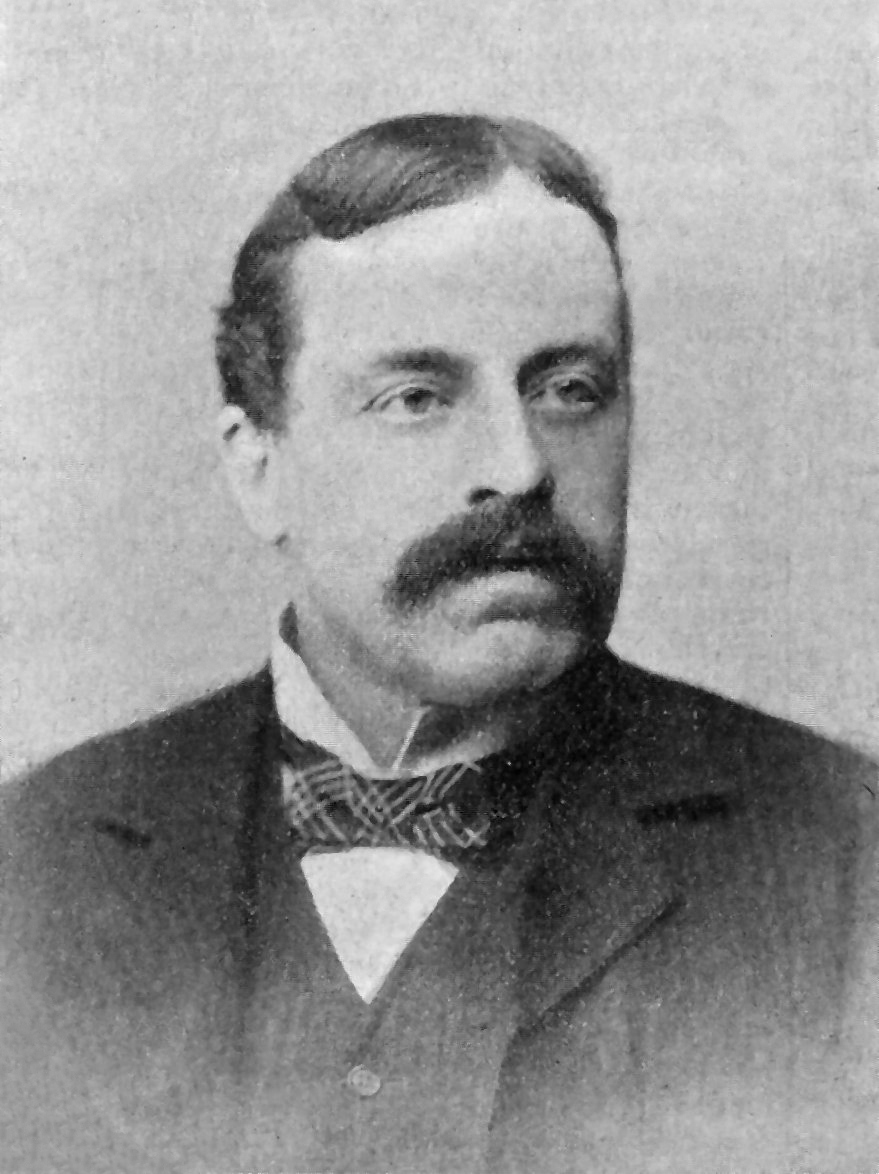
Sydney Pardon, the editor of Wisden, condemned throwing in print on several occasions.

=== Background ===
For many years in England, there had been controversy over bowling actions; several bowlers were believed to throw rather than bowl the ball, which was contrary to the Laws of Cricket. (Note: The 1884 Laws of Cricket, and their subsequent revision in 1894 stated: "The ball must be bowled; if thrown or jerked the umpire shall call no-ball". Some critics noted it was difficult to tell the difference between a legitimate delivery and a throw, to which Sydney Pardon responded: "A throw may be difficult to define in words, but to the eye of a practical and unbiassed cricketer it is, I think, very obvious".) Lancashire had a particularly poor reputation among other county teams for using bowlers who threw: by the early 1880s, up to four of Lancashire's main bowlers were judged to be unfair, including John Crossland who bowled very quickly. By the mid-1880s, several teams refused to play Lancashire on account of their bowling attack. Mainly through the actions of Lord Harris, many of the suspect bowlers were forced out of cricket, and bowling actions became more legitimate. However, some players continued to bowl with questionable actions, including members of the Lancashire team. The issue intensified in 1896 when two of the Australian touring team, Ernie Jones and Tom McKibbin, seemed to throw the ball regularly; Sydney Pardon, the editor of Wisden, wrote: "The mortifying fact was that the illegal bowling was due entirely to our own weakness in not having the laws of the game carried out. The Australians only did against us what we had over and over again done against them."

Following the 1896 tour, the English authorities realised action had to be taken. Jim Phillips, an Australian-born umpire who journeyed each year between his native country and England, travelled to Australia with an English touring team in 1897–98. During two of the matches he umpired, Phillips no-balled Ernie Jones for throwing. (Note: To be no-balled ("called") for throwing meant the umpire judged that the bowler had thrown, rather than bowled, the ball. The umpire called no-ball; an extra delivery would have to be bowled and the batting team were awarded a run. The batsman could not be dismissed from a no-ball except through a run out.) Upon returning to England for the 1898 season, Phillips also called C. B. Fry, a prominent amateur cricketer and all-round sportsman, for throwing. This was the second of three occasions in 1898 that Fry was no-balled. Other umpires, following Phillips' lead, no-balled Fry and Frank Hopkins. Two further bowlers, albeit not famous cricketers, were called for throwing in 1899.

=== Mold called for throwing ===
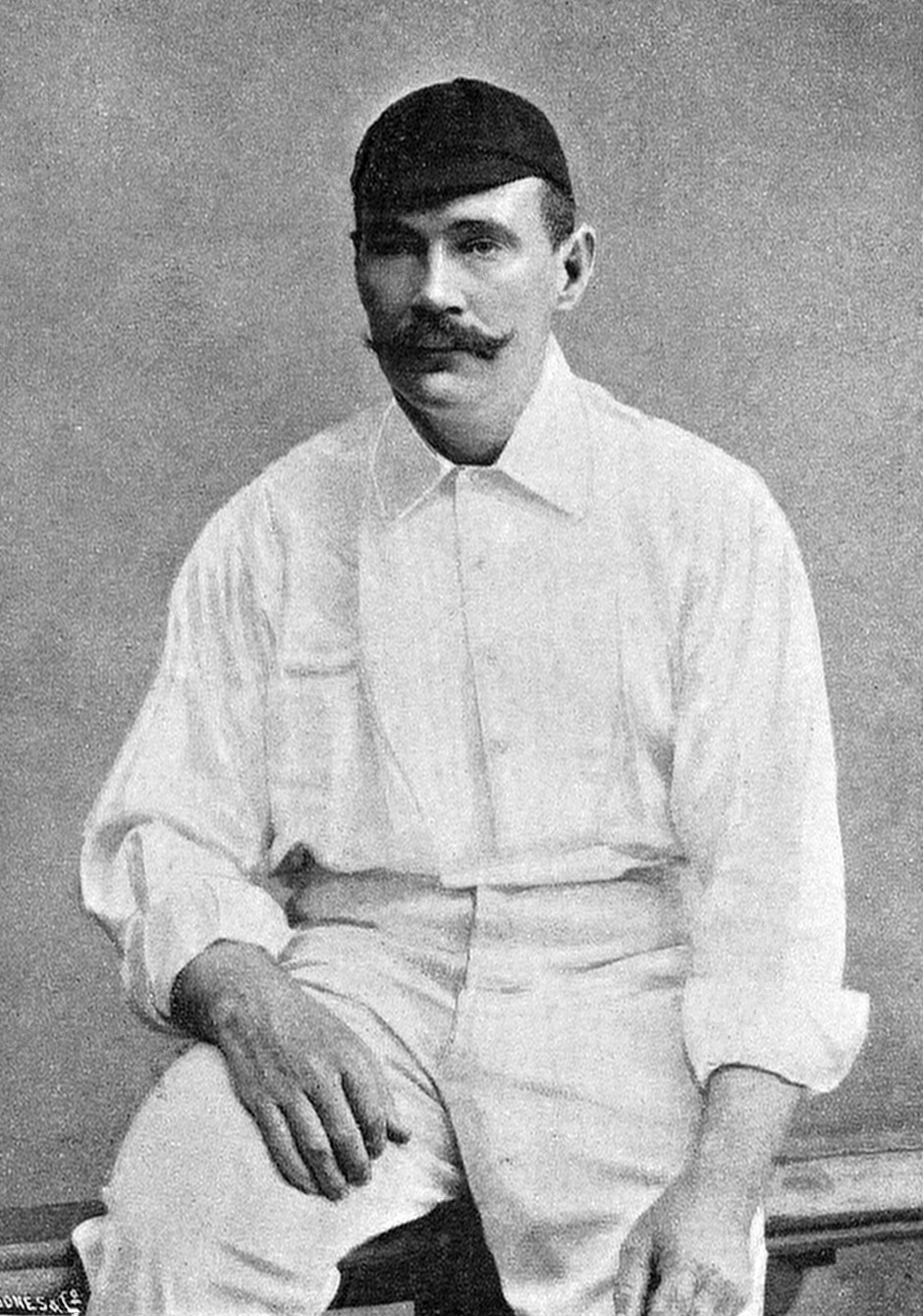
Jim Phillips, the umpire who twice called Mold for throwing

During the 1900 season, Fry was once more no-balled at the beginning of June, this time by William West. The concerted action against throwing reached a peak when Phillips umpired the match between Nottinghamshire and Lancashire in Nottingham on 26 June. Early on the first morning of the three-day match, Mold came on to bowl when Nottinghamshire had scored 34. In Mold's first over, Phillips twice no-balled him for throwing. Lancashire's captain, Archie MacLaren, withdrew Mold from the bowling attack at the end of the over and he did not bowl again in the match. (Note: Phillips, one of the usual two umpires in the match, was standing at the batsman's end of the pitch (i.e. the square leg umpire). Up until 1899, only the umpire facing the batsman could call no-ball. In 1899, the law was changed so that either umpire could adjudge a no-ball.) However, MacLaren later defended Mold in the press. The match reports in both The Times and Wisden commented that Mold had been lucky never to be no-balled before in his career; he was the most high-profile bowler to be called in the Phillips-led crackdown on bowling actions. Mold played another nine times in 1900 without being called for throwing, but he did not play in any of the Lancashire matches umpired by Phillips. Later in the season, Phillips called the Somerset bowler Ted Tyler. By the end of the season, Mold had taken 97 wickets at 14.01.

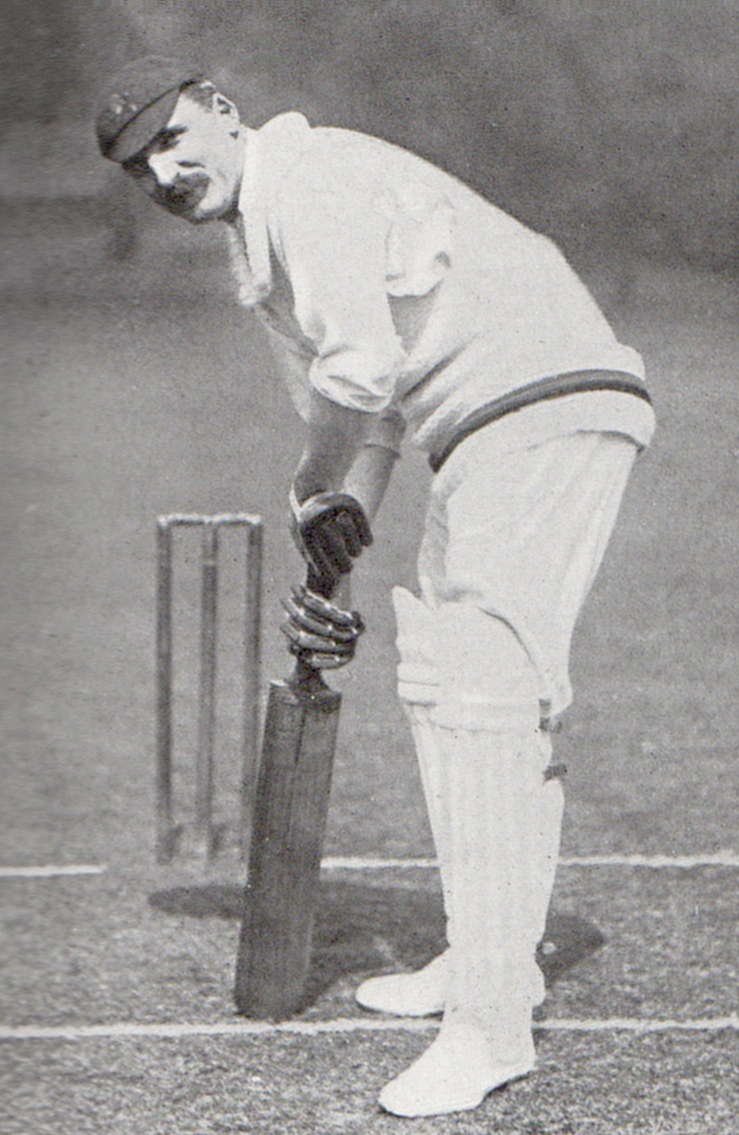
Archie MacLaren, the Lancashire captain, supported Mold throughout the controversy.

That December, at their annual meeting at Lord's, the captains of the first-class counties discussed the problem of throwing. MacLaren asked those present at the meeting to give their opinion of Mold's bowling. According to MacLaren, they "replied to a man that they considered that Mold was not always fair". Reports in the press stated that they voted by a majority of eleven to one that Mold's action was unfair, and that along with other bowlers whose actions were suspected, he should not bowl in the coming season. The captains further recommended that bowlers with illegal actions should be banned, suspended or warned depending on the severity of their transgression. The meeting proved controversial, and disputes arose over how many captains had supported the decision. MacLaren claimed that he was the only captain to support Mold. Despite the verdict of the meeting, Lancashire's committee remained of the opinion that Mold bowled legally; the Lancashire president A. N. Hornby and several of Mold's teammates also publicly backed the bowler. Opinions among other players and in the press varied as to the fairness of Mold's bowling, but sympathy was expressed for the damage to Mold's career and reputation, while Pelham Warner suggested that it was unfair to ban Mold completely. Some critics believed that the captains should not have passed judgement at all. The MCC, responsible for the laws of cricket and the organisation of the English game, were asked to adjudicate by several county committees. Reluctant to let the decision stand, the MCC overruled the captains, preferring to leave the matter to individual umpires. However, the umpires were instructed to pay close attention to suspect bowlers during the coming season.

Mold throwing to A. N. Hornby in a July 1901 reenactment intended to establish his technique was valid

Although he may have been expected to retire following the controversy and in view of his age, Mold continued to play for Lancashire, who were short of quality bowlers, at the start of the 1901 season. At least one umpire was asked by the MCC to report specifically on Mold's bowling, but decided it was fair, and no umpire initially called him for throwing. He missed two Lancashire matches in which Phillips was an umpire, wishing to avoid a confrontation, but Lancashire were criticised by the public for omitting Mold from these matches. Consequently, he played in the game against Somerset umpired by Phillips, which started on 11 July at Old Trafford Cricket Ground. Under the captaincy of MacLaren, Mold opened the attack and bowled with Phillips at square leg. In Mold's second over of the game, Phillips no-balled him for throwing. Acting at the request of the Lancashire committee, MacLaren then switched Mold to bowl from the opposite end so that Phillips would be at the bowler's end. Even so, Phillips continued to no-ball him, and after 10 overs, Mold had been called 16 times by Phillips. MacLaren removed Mold from the attack, although he returned to bowl later without further action from either umpire. For the remainder of the match, Mold bowled from Phillips' end without censure; Phillips believed he had made his point. The other umpire took no action at any point in the match. The crowd at the game protested noisily against Phillips, for a time shouting "no-ball" as every ball was bowled, and making comments about him. According to Wisden, Phillips' actions caused "a great sensation ... The incident naturally gave rise to much excitement, and for the next few days nothing else was talked about in the cricket world." At the conclusion of the match, Mitchell and Kenyon, a film-making company based in Blackburn, filmed the players leaving the field and took footage of Mold bowling in the nets to Hornby. Phillips received criticism for his actions and Mold had some support in the press. Mold's Times obituary noted: "Mold did not lack defenders, but those who argued that he was, and always had been, a perfectly fair bowler, had a very bad case. The weight of expert evidence was overwhelmingly against them."

=== Aftermath ===
In December 1901, the MCC approved the scheme previously suggested—that the county captains should meet to discuss the fairness of suspected bowlers. It was proposed that any bowler who was judged to be unfair by a two-to-one majority of captains would be banned for at least a season. The MCC also recommended that the counties not play suspected bowlers and that any bowler called for throwing should be removed from the attack in the interests of the spirit of cricket. In the 1902 Wisden, Sydney Pardon wrote: "Never in the last twenty years or more has there been so little unfair or doubtful bowling as in the season of 1901. Indeed the improvement was so marked as to make it clear that, if the captains stick to their guns, we shall soon be entirely free from the evil of which not very long ago it seemed impossible to get rid." After 1901, there were only isolated incidents regarding illegal bowling actions until the Second World War, and throwing ceased to be an issue in English cricket, in which no cricketer was no-balled for throwing between 1908 and 1952.

=== Final years and death ===
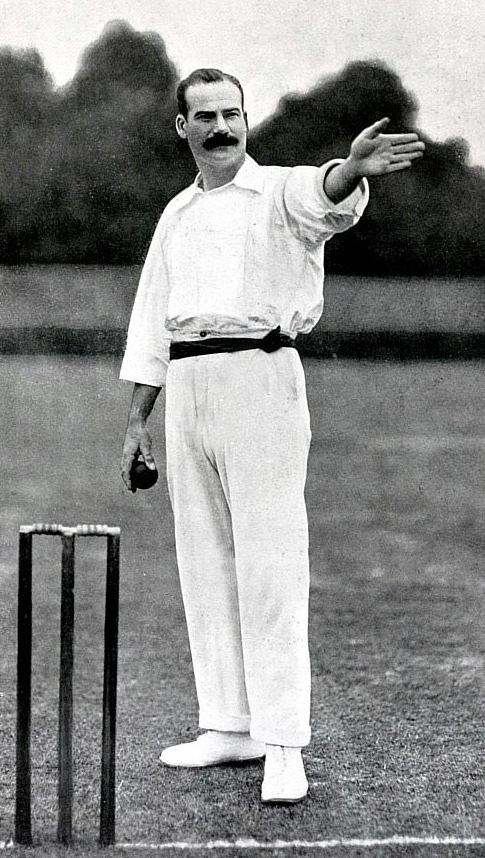
Mold c. 1900

Mold played another three matches in 1901 without being no-balled for throwing, but his reputation was ruined and he retired at the end of the season, although Lancashire had offered him a new contract. In this final season, he took 59 wickets at 19.35. In his career as a whole, he took 1,673 first-class wickets at an average of 15.54. In 2012, he is 57th on the list of leading first-class wicket-takers; among those whose careers were contemporaneous with or preceded Mold's, he is placed 19th.

Subsequently, Mold returned to play for Northamptonshire in 1903, and played league cricket in his native county, although he struggled with increasing weight in his later years. In his retirement, he became the landlord of a public house in Middleton Cheney, the village in which he was born. He took up shooting as a hobby and looked after his ailing mother. After a long illness, he died on 29 April 1921 in Middleton Cheney. The memorial on his gravestone states: "This stone was erected by his old cricketing friends as a token of their affection, admiration and respect". It was paid for by a subscription opened by the Lancashire Committee.

== Bowling technique ==
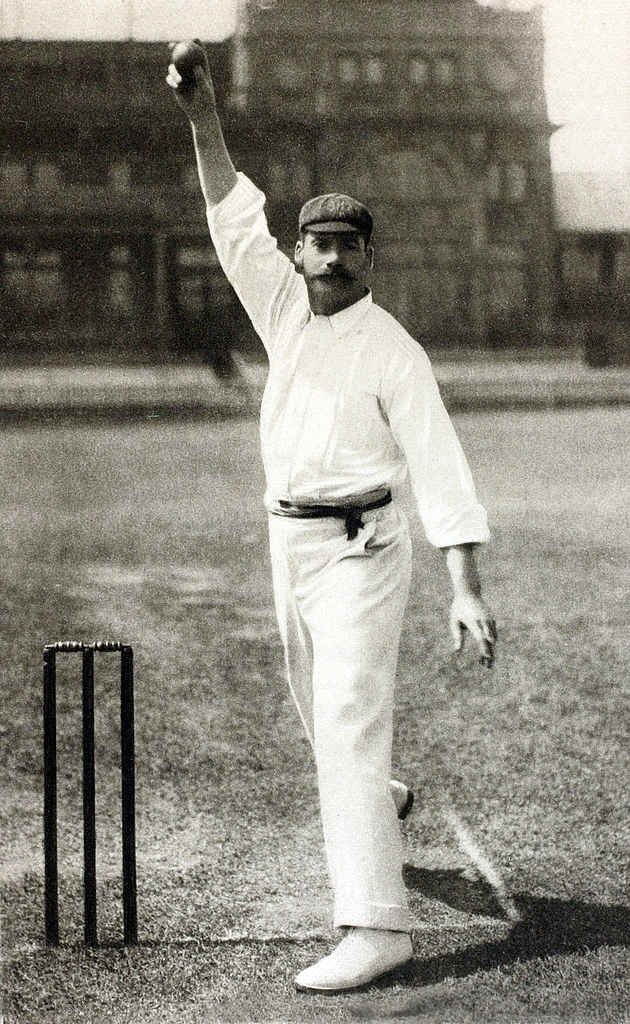
Mold delivering the ball c. 1897

A fast bowler who operated from a very short run-up, Mold bowled extremely quickly, releasing the ball with his arm very high in his early years, although later in his career, his arm was lower in delivery. Unusually for a bowler of his pace, he could make the ball deviate from straight, either through seam movement or cutting his fingers over it before release, but most of his wickets were taken through sheer speed. His obituary in the Manchester Guardian stated that he was among the fastest bowlers of all time and his bowling action was "beautiful" and possessed "fine grace". If the pitch was uneven or otherwise difficult for batting, he was extremely difficult to bat against: in 1892, Wisden noted: "On anything like a rough or bumpy wicket [pitch] he is, beyond all question, the most difficult and dangerous bowler of the day, the ball getting up from the pitch so high and so fast as to intimidate all but the very pluckiest of batsmen." The Times later noted that he was very successful for Lancashire and a difficult bowler to face. In combination with Briggs, he bowled a very high proportion of Lancashire's overs. At times, he struggled with a knee injury but continued to bowl with little opportunity to rest.

Opinion was divided over the legality of Mold's bowling action. After no-balling Mold for the second time, Phillips wrote that he had long suspected Mold of throwing. Even though he believed Mold was trying to bowl with a straight arm in the Somerset match, Phillips considered many more deliveries to be throws than merely those he called. In his own defence, Mold queried why Phillips never acted on his prior suspicions, and suggested that the umpire did not make it clear which part of Mold's bowling action was unfair. The Manchester Guardian, reporting on the Somerset match in 1901, noted that many umpires had apparently viewed Mold's action as fair earlier in the season, even after the instruction from the MCC to pay careful attention to him. It stated that "the general opinion was that if one ball was to be called a throw then every ball he sent down was of the same order." However, some critics noted that when bowling an occasional faster ball, Mold's action changed slightly; this was the delivery to which Phillips objected. His obituary in the Manchester Guardian stated that the lack of action by umpires other than Phillips in 1901, and throughout Mold's career, meant that the "charge against Mold, then, can hardly be said to have been 'proven'".

Mold continued to have his supporters. MacLaren later wrote that he believed Mold never intentionally threw; A. N. Hornby consistently defended Mold, partly because, as Mold's captain during the 1890s, it would have been a slur against his sportsmanship to admit that an unfair bowler had been in his team. Most Lancashire supporters never doubted that Mold's action was fair. Cricket historian Don Ambrose suggests that Mold probably did throw his faster delivery, which may have accounted for the high proportion of his wickets which were bowled. It also explained his ability to produce a delivery that surprised the batsman; W. G. Grace once observed that it was particularly painful to be struck by a delivery from Mold. The lack of action by Phillips' fellow umpires was possibly, according to Ambrose, due to their unwillingness to cause problems for a fellow professional cricketer. However, Ambrose also suggests that in the Somerset match, Phillips was determined to end Mold's career and that not every delivery that he called was actually a throw.

Mold was popular with other cricketers. The Times said: "Apart from the burning question of throwing, not a word could be said against him. He was liked by all his brother professionals, and popular wherever he played." However, his achievements were always qualified by suspicion over the legality of his bowling action, even before he was no-balled by Phillips. A batsman who played against him when he first appeared for Northamptonshire said: "If he is fair he is the best bowler in England, but I think he is a worse thrower than ever Crossland [the Lancashire bowler of the 1880s with a suspect bowling action] was." Mold's Times obituary stated: "He was a deadly fast bowler, but, all through his career, even his best feats in the cricket field were spoken of with something of apology".
