= Tom Richardson (cricketer) =

English cricketer (1870–1912)

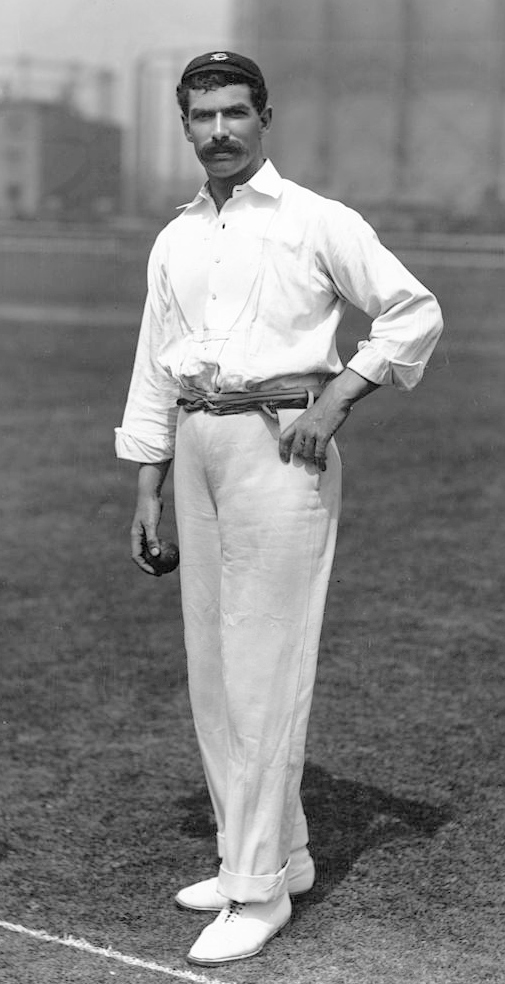
- Richardson in 1897

Personal information
- Born: 11 August 1870; Byfleet, Surrey, England
- Died: 2 July 1912 (aged 41); Chambéry, France
- Batting: Right-handed
- Bowling: Right-arm fast

International information
- National side: England (1893–1898)
- Test debut: 24 August 1893 v Australia
- Last Test: 2 March 1898 v Australia

Career statistics
Competition	Tests	First-class
Matches	14	358
Runs scored	177	3,424
Batting average	11.06	9.64
100s/50s	0/0	0/2
Top score	25*	69
Balls bowled	4,498	78,992
Wickets	88	2,104
Bowling average	25.22	18.43
5 wickets in innings	11	200
10 wickets in match	4	72
Best bowling	8/94	10/45
Catches/stumpings	5/–	126/–
- Source: CricInfo, 23 December 2018

Tom Richardson (11 August 1870 – 2 July 1912) was an English cricketer. A fast bowler, Richardson relied to a great extent on the break-back (a fast ball moving from off to leg), a relatively long run-up and high arm which allowed him to gain sharp lift on fast pitches even from the full, straight length he always bowled. He played 358 first-class cricket matches including 14 Tests, taking a total of 2,104 wickets. In the four consecutive seasons from 1894 to 1897 he took 1,005 wickets, a figure surpassed over such a period only by the slow bowler Tich Freeman. He took 290 wickets in 1895, again a figure only exceeded by Freeman (twice). In 1963 Neville Cardus selected him as one of his "Six Giants of the Wisden Century".

== Early career ==
Richardson was born in Byfleet, England, and first played for his native county in 1892. He showed promise with some strong performances in minor matches, notably fifteen wickets against Essex. However, his first-class record that season was only moderate.

With Surrey's bowling mainstay for the previous decade George Lohmann declining rapidly in health, Richardson made a totally unexpected advance to be the second-highest wicket-taker in the country in 1893. Performances of 11 for 95 for Surrey against the touring Australians and 10 for 156 in the third Test, and especially the speed and stamina showed in them, already marked Richardson as one of the game's top bowlers. Although early in the year it was thought by many that his delivery constituted a throw, Richardson worked on straightening his arm and adverse comments were rarely heard again. In 1894, Richardson cemented his reputation with consistent performances: he would have reached 200 wickets but for a thigh strain in June and his average of 10.32 has never been equalled since, whilst his astonishing strike rate of 23 balls per wicket has never been approached subsequently. It was his performances in Australia during the 1894/1895 tour – maintaining speed under hot weather – that attracted attention. In the first Test at the SCG, he bowled 55 overs without losing his speed, and in the last his energetic bowling without help from the pitch directly won England the match.

The following year saw Richardson go from strength to strength both in dry weather and when the pitches became treacherous after mid-July. Despite having to bowl 8,491 balls at a great pace, he never showed any sign of losing his form and set a new record in taking 290 wickets (bettered only by Tich Freeman, a slow bowler, in 1928 and 1933). In 1896, Richardson's bowling at Lord's dismissed Australia for 53 and won England the match. During the following Test at Old Trafford, which England lost by three wickets, after bowling 390 balls in the first innings in perfect batting conditions (taking seven for 168), when Australia were set 125 to win on a pitch showing no sign of wear, Richardson was able to bowl 178 balls without a rest, take six for 76 and almost win England a seemingly lost game. It is said that he did not bowl one bad ball during this spell of three hours and J.T. Hearne dropped a catch off his bowling when Australia were 99 for 7.

Neville Cardus recorded the scene when Australia crept home by three wickets: "His body still shook from the violent motion. He stood there like some fine animal baffled at the uselessness of great strength and effort in this world... A companion led him to the pavilion, and there he fell wearily to a seat." David Frith suggests the truth was somewhat more prosaic. Richardson was the first off the field and had sunk two pints before anyone else had their boots off.

Although he was not required on a wet wicket in the last Test (and nearly withdrew over a pay dispute), Richardson was named a Cricketer of the Year and in 1897 took 273 wickets at the same cost as in 1895. In the four consecutive seasons 1894 to 1897 he took 1,005 wickets, a figure unequalled by any fast bowler before or since.

== Decline ==
Richardson was chosen to tour Australia in 1897/1898, but this was where his successful years ended. Around this time his weight began increasing, thus reducing his speed and stamina. He produced one great performance on the disappointing 1897/1898 tour with eight wickets for 94 in the first innings of the fifth Test, but as soon as he returned to England his decline was plain for all to see. Indeed, in the first two months of the season Richardson accomplished almost no performance of note, and even when he improved from the beginning of July onwards, Surrey could no longer rely on him to bowl over after over on the extremely true Oval pitches; his body could no longer carry the workload of previous years. In a few games late in the season at the Oval, against Yorkshire (when Surrey inflicted that county's biggest defeat) and Warwickshire (when he took a career-best 15 for 83 on a pitch offering no help), he appeared as potent as the bowler of 1897. Nevertheless, his haul of wickets in the County Championship fell from 237 to 126 and their cost from about 14 runs per wicket to over 21.

== Later career ==
Prevented from playing the first few games by injury Richardson declined still more sharply in 1899. Though after returning to the Surrey eleven he produced some impressive performances (notably against Kent at the Oval), Richardson failed to take 100 wickets for the season. As a result, he was out of the running for Test selection, and the benefit Surrey gave him for his service between 1893 and 1897 was much less lucrative than everybody had hoped despite Surrey winning the Championship.

However, Richardson showed some improvement in 1900, increasing his haul of wickets from 98 to 122 and taking 14 wickets for 185 runs at Leyton, whilst in 1901 on the best of wickets almost throughout the year he took 159 wickets including impressive performances against the South Africans (11 for 125) and Yorkshire (7 for 105 in one innings). The following two summers were all against fast bowlers, and Richardson naturally suffered. He remained a strenuous worker, and when helped by the pitch (as at Sheffield in 1903) Richardson could still show glimpses of the great mid-1890s bowler. Nonetheless, it was clear to all who observed him that his increasing weight would soon become an issue. In 1904, Richardson bowled so ineffectively that he was dropped at the end of May, and not re-engaged by Surrey at the end of the year.

At the time he lived in Bath, and played once for Somerset in 1905, but it was clear from his failure then that he could no longer play serious cricket. His weight gain, combined with a congenital heart abnormality, resulted in a fatal heart attack at the age of 41, whilst on a summer walking holiday in Chambéry, France. According to a number of sources (including Bert Strudwick), he had been in good health and spirits before leaving England. A widespread rumour that he had committed suicide was disproved by research carried out by Ralph Barker. Richardson was buried in Richmond Cemetery.

== Honoured by Wisden ==
In the 1963 edition of Wisden Cricketers' Almanack, Richardson was selected by Neville Cardus as one of the "Six Giants of the Wisden Century". This was a special commemorative selection requested by Wisden for its 100th edition. The other five players chosen were Sydney Barnes, Don Bradman, W. G. Grace, Jack Hobbs, and Victor Trumper.
