= William Gunn (cricketer) =

English sportsman (1858–1921)

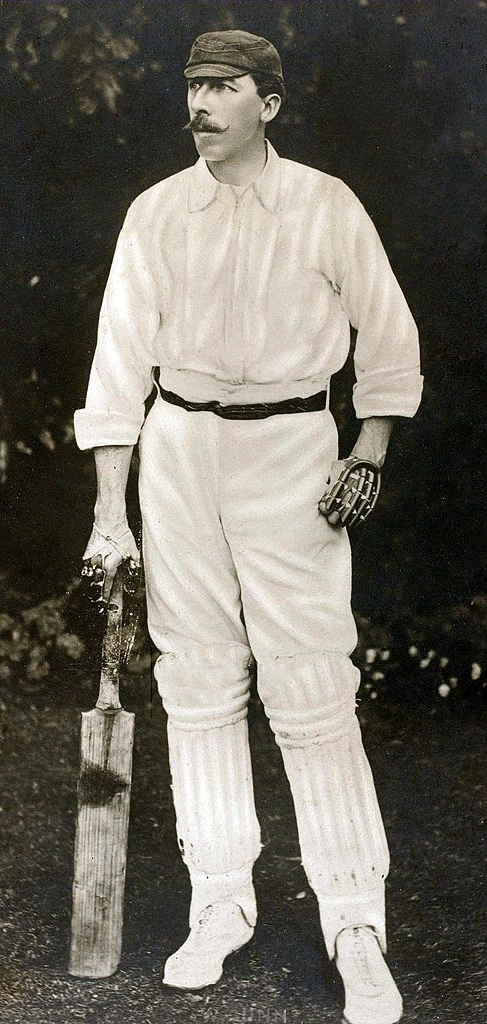
- Gunn in around 1890

Personal information
- Born: 4 December 1858; St Ann's, Nottingham
- Died: 19 January 1921 (aged 62); Standard Hill, Nottingham
- Batting: Right-handed
- Bowling: Right-arm slow

International information
- National side: England
- Test debut (cap 52): 28 January 1887 v Australia
- Last Test: 3 June 1899 v Australia

Career statistics
Competition	Tests	First-class
Matches	11	521
Runs scored	392	25,691
Batting average	21.77	33.02
100s/50s	1/1	48/117
Top score	102*	273
Balls bowled	0	3,540
Wickets	–	76
Bowling average	–	23.68
5 wickets in innings	–	2
10 wickets in match	–	1
Best bowling	–	6/48
Catches/stumpings	5/–	333/1
- Source: CricInfo, 12 December 2018

William Gunn (4 December 1858 – 29 January 1921) was an English sportsman who played internationally in both cricket and football. In first-class cricket, Gunn played professionally for Nottinghamshire from 1880 to 1904 and represented England in 11 Test matches. In football, he played for both Notts County and Nottingham Forest as an amateur and played twice for England, scoring one goal in the inaugural 1884 British Home Championship.

== Cricket career ==
Born at St Ann's, Nottingham, Gunn was a specialist right-handed batsman who occasionally bowled slow underarm lobs. He was an outfielder who was noted for his accurate throwing. His most successful season was 1889, following which he was voted Wisden Batsman of the Year. He joined his Nottinghamshire colleagues Alfred Shaw and Arthur Shrewsbury in the English cricket team in Australia in 1886–87.

In his Wisden citation, Gunn was described in the following terms:

...we think we are correct in saying that no batsman of the same height [6 ft. 2½ in.] has ever played in more elegant and perfect form. Even before he rose to his fame as a batsman, Gunn was one of the most brilliant fields in the country, and it was the general opinion of practical cricketers of his era that in the long field and at third man he had never had a superior. Gunn was a member of Alfred Shaw and Arthur Shrewsbury's team in Australia during the season of 1886/7, and averaged 21.8 in eleven-a-side matches, and 20.7 in all matches.

== Football career ==
=== Early career ===
Gunn first signed to play football for Nottingham Forest. Gunn signed for Forest sometime in 1880–1881 and made only one appearance for Forest, in 1881.

In the February 1882 he signed for Notts County but had to wait until November 1882 to make his debut. This was an F.A. Cup first round tie, played at Trent Bridge, Nottingham against Sheffield. Notts County achieved a big win, 6–1. Gunn was 6 ft 2 in tall, weighed 12st 2 lbs, and had the ability to throw a football long distances, "establishing himself as the Delap of his day by hurling the ball inhuman distances... with one hand". At the time, rules for throw-ins were not formalised, but when his throws "repeatedly hurtled into Scotland's penalty area from well inside England's own half" in an unofficial match in 1882, he "forced the FA to change the law to [that of] ... today."

Wisden described his footballing career in the following terms: "For several years Gunn was one of the most brilliant forwards in the country at Association football, but latterly gave up the game, reserving himself entirely for cricket." Gunn founded the sports equipment firm Gunn and Moore in 1885 and became the first former professional cricketer to serve on a county club committee. His nephews, George and John Gunn, were both England Test cricketers.

=== 1888–1889 season ===
Gunn, playing as a winger, made his League debut on 22 September 1888 at Wellington Road, the then home of Aston Villa. Notts County were overwhelmed by the home team and lost 9–1. To this day that remains Notts County' heaviest defeat. The team lost by the same score on two other occasions. When Billy Gunn played as a winger on 29 September 1888 against Aston Villa he was 29 years 300 days old; that made him, on that fourth weekend of League football, Notts County' oldest player. Billy Gunn appeared in one of the 22 League matches played by Notts County in season 1888–89.

=== 1889 onwards ===
By season 1892–93, when Billy Gunn ceased playing football, he had made 28 appearances (three League) and scored 14 goals (one League). Even before he finished playing Gunn was appointed a director of Notts County Football Club in August 1890. In July 1920 he became the President of Notts County Football Club. In a series of reader's letters appearing in the 'Football Post' in 1920, a Mr. W. Dawson of Sutton–in–Ashfield, shared his reminisces of Billy Gunn: "The finest outside–right who ever played football. How he used to delight the Trent Bridge spectators with his delightful runs along the wing. He seemed to go from one end of the field to the other in about three strides." The latter observation obviously associated with his great height and resultant long stride. Gunn was also renowned – before the law changed – for massive one–armed throws from the touchline. He died, still as President of Notts County, on 19 January 1921, in the Standard Hill district of Nottingham, at the age of 63.

== Gallery ==
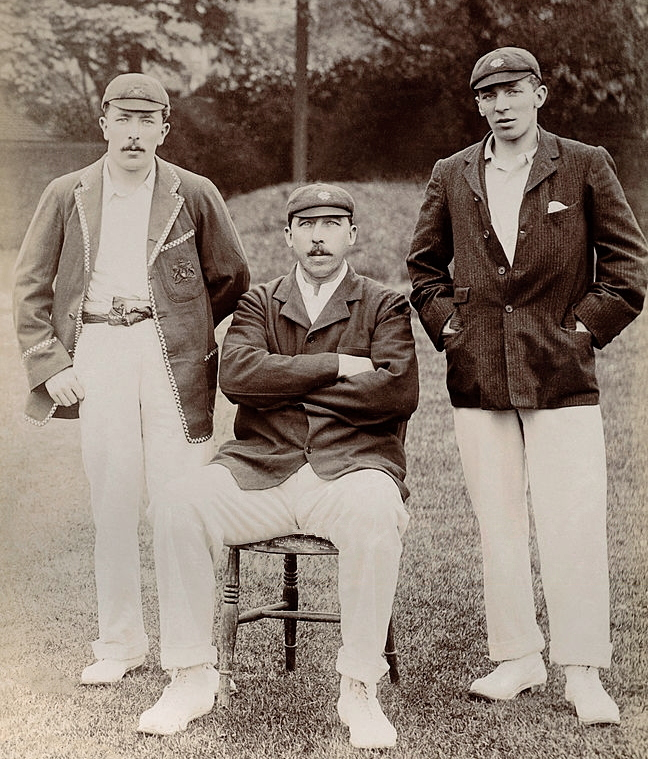
Left-right: John, Billy and George Gunn c. 1904

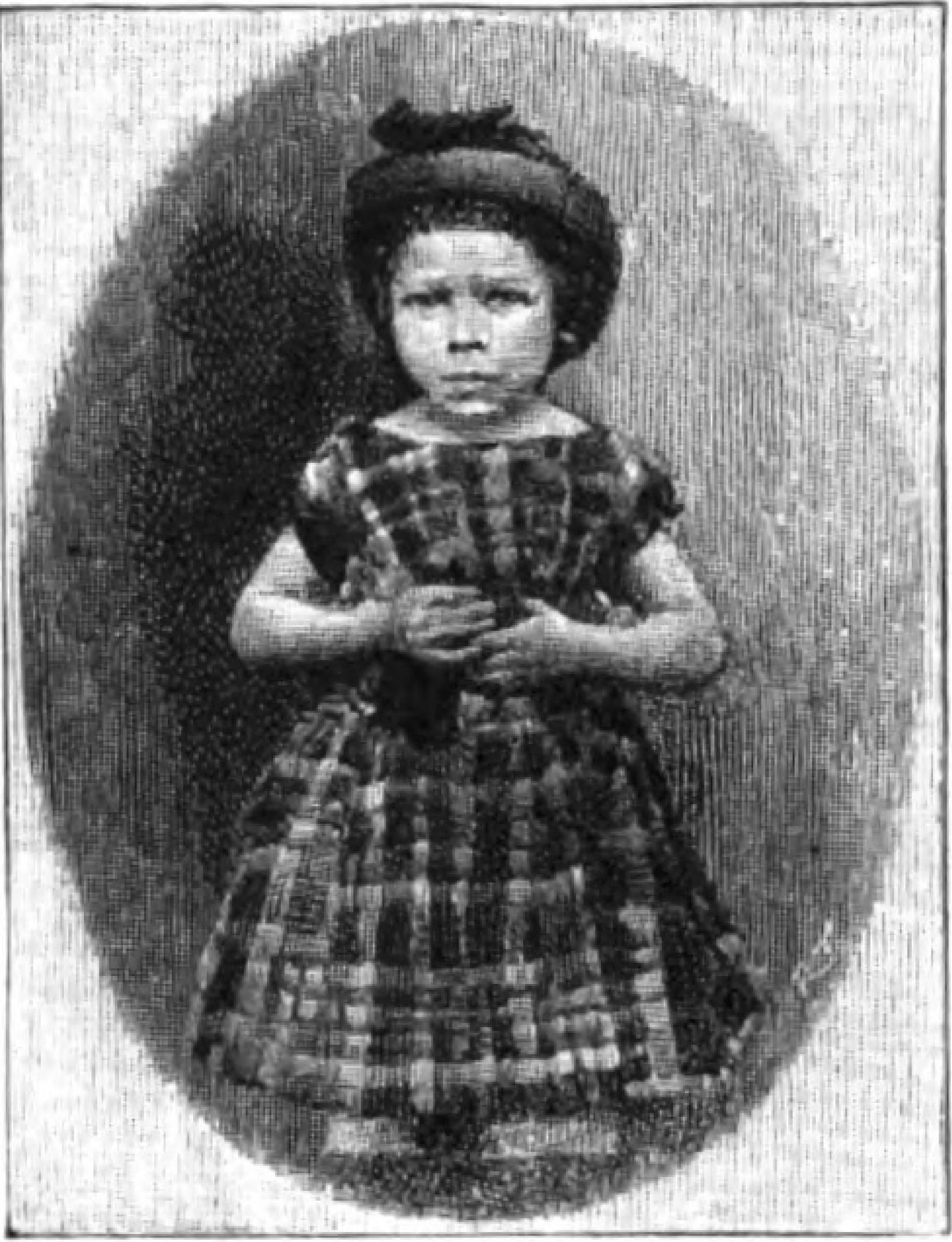
Billy Gunn aged 3

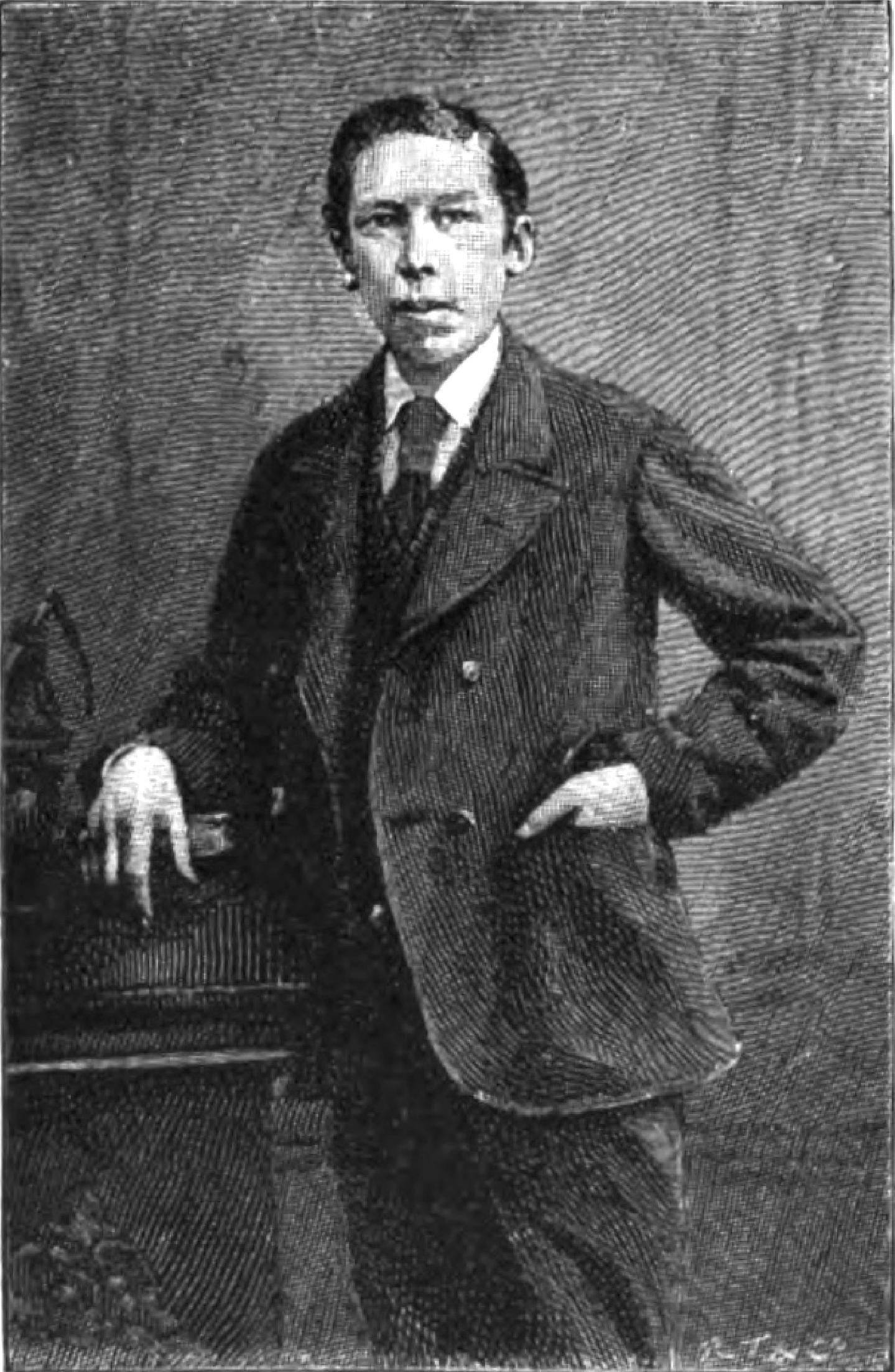
Aged 14

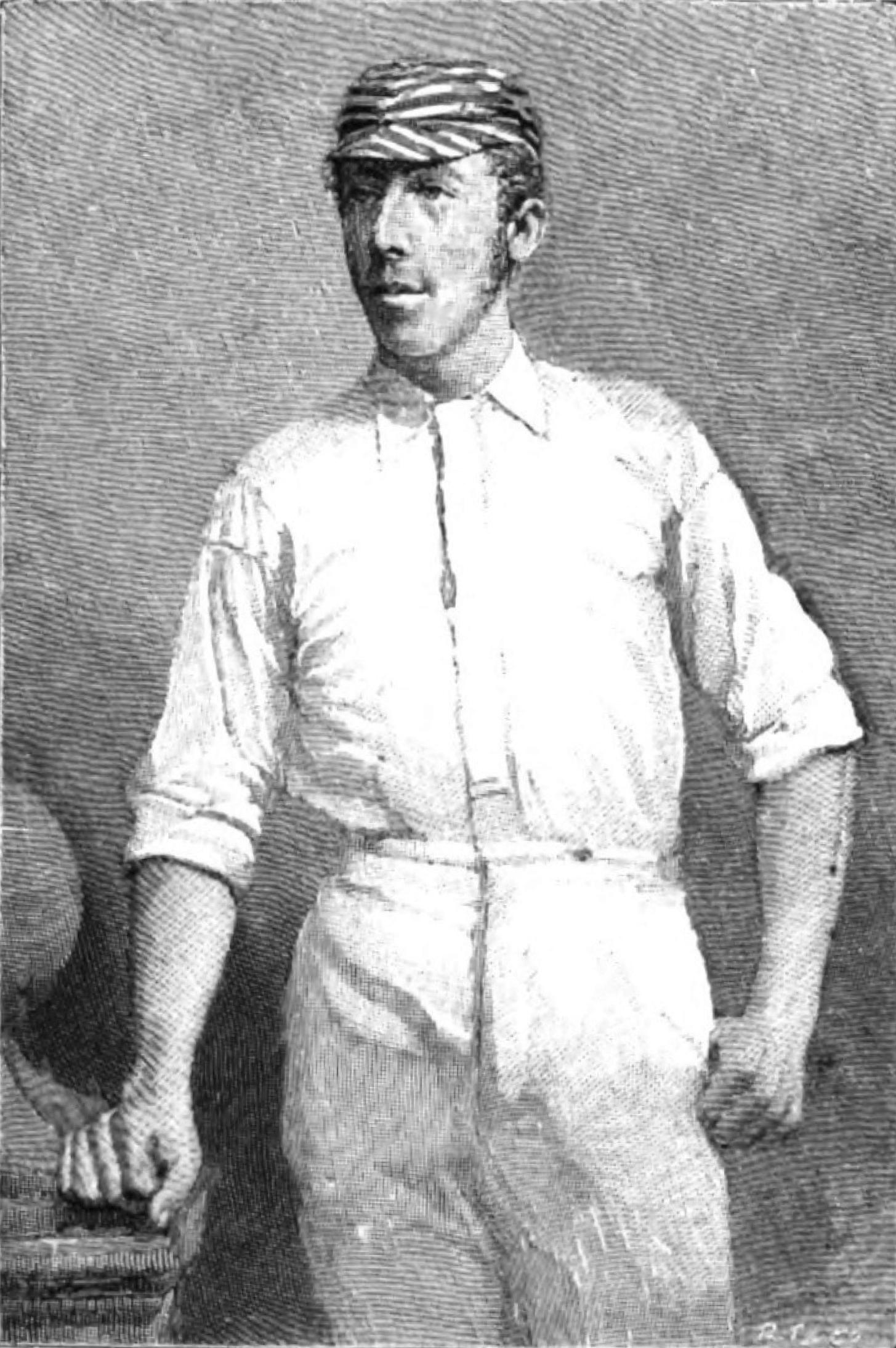
Aged 21

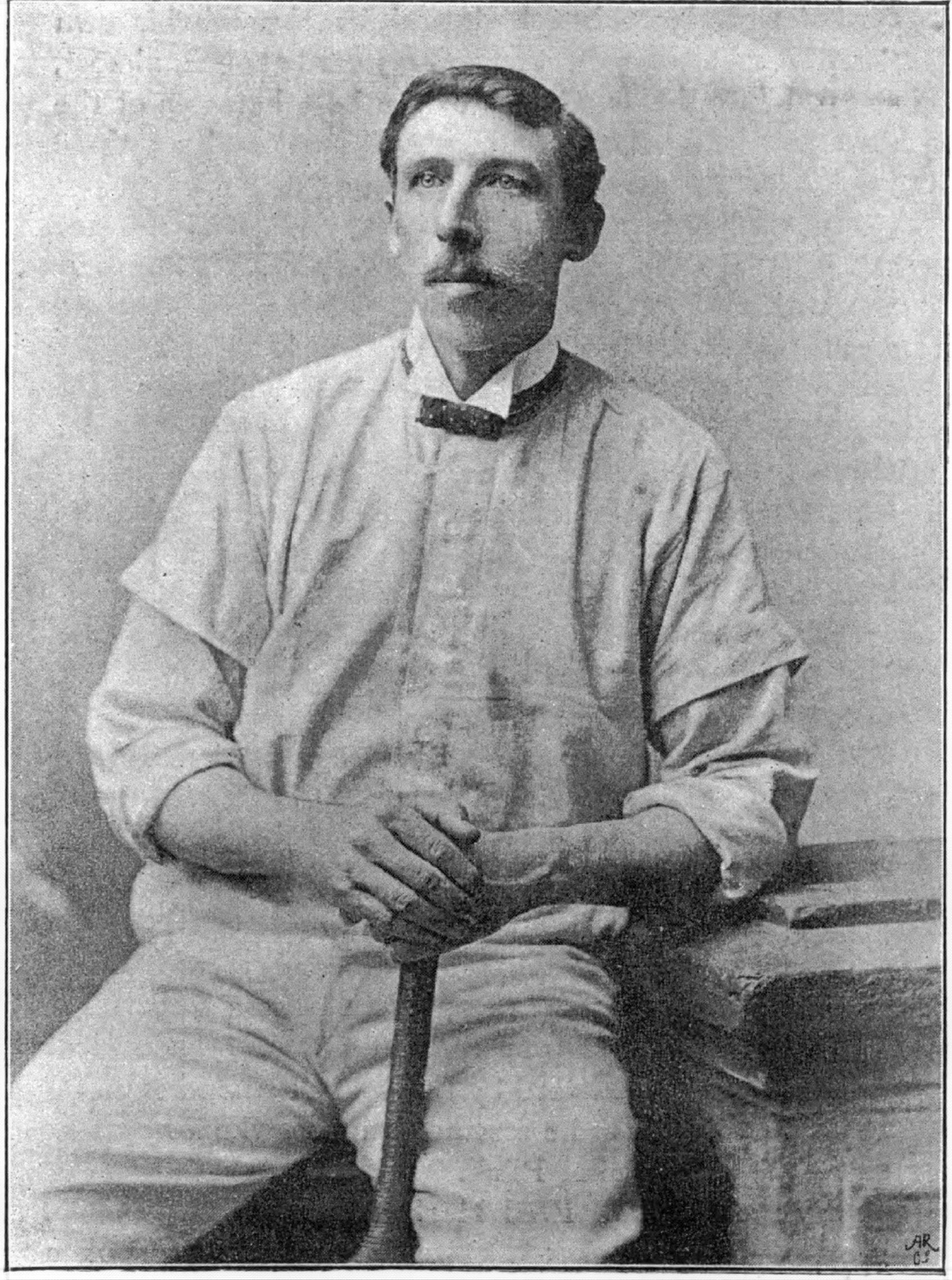
Aged 34

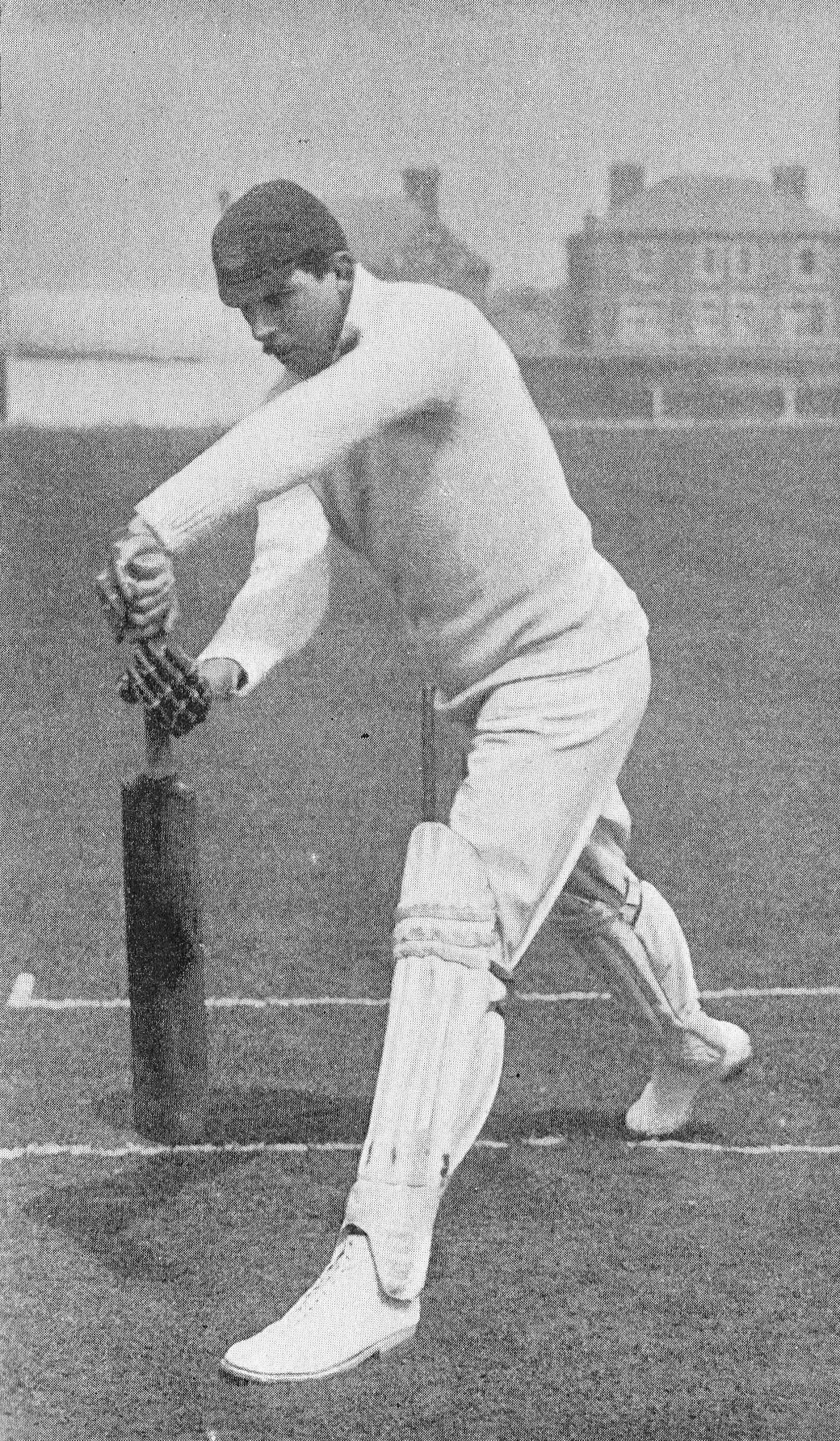
Gunn's drive between mid-off and extra-cover
