= 1897 in sports =

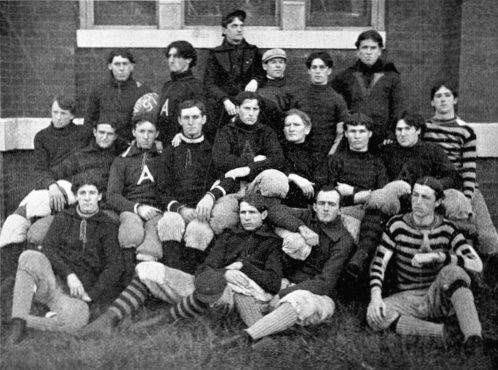
The fall 1897 Alabama Polytechnic Institute (now Auburn University) varsity football team

1897 in sports describes the year's events in world sport.

== American football ==
College championship

- College football national championship – Penn Quakers

Professional championships

- Western Pennsylvania champions – Greensburg Athletic Association

== Association football ==
England

- The Football League – Aston Villa 47 points, Sheffield United 36, Derby County 36, Preston North End 34, Liverpool 33, Sheffield Wednesday 31
- FA Cup final – Aston Villa 3–2 Everton at Crystal Palace, London.
- Aston Villa becomes the second club to complete The Double in English football

Scotland

- Scottish Football League – Hearts
- Scottish Cup – Rangers 5–1 Dumbarton at Hampden Park

== Athletics ==
- John J. McDermott wins the first running of the Boston Marathon, then known as the B.A.A. Road Race
- USA Outdoor Track and Field Championships

== Australian rules football ==
VFL Premiership

- Formation of Victorian Football League (now Australian Football League) with initial clubs being Carlton, Collingwood, Essendon, Fitzroy, Geelong, Melbourne, St Kilda and South Melbourne
- Essendon wins the 1st VFL Premiership (under the finals system used this year only, no Grand Final is played)

SANFL Premiership

- Port Adelaide

WAFL Premiership

- West Perth

== Baseball ==
National championship

- Boston Beaneaters wins the National League championship

Events

- Temple Cup – Baltimore Orioles 4–1 Boston Beaneaters

== Boxing ==
Events

- 17 March — Bob Fitzsimmons knocks out James J. Corbett in the 14th round to win the World Heavyweight Championship in the first championship fight ever captured on film.

Lineal world champions

- World Heavyweight Championship – James J. Corbett → Bob Fitzsimmons
- World Middleweight Championship – title vacant
- World Welterweight Championship – Tommy Ryan
- World Lightweight Championship – George "Kid" Lavigne
- World Featherweight Championship – George Dixon → Solly Smith
- World Bantamweight Championship – Jimmy Barry

== Canadian Football ==
- The Canadian Intercollegiate Rugby Football Union is founded
- Ontario Rugby Football Union - Hamilton Tigers
- Quebec Rugby Football Union - Ottawa College
- There is no MRFU champion this year due to scheduling issues
- Northwest Championship - St John's
- Dominion Championship - Ottawa College defeats Hamilton 14-10

== Cricket ==
Events

- Two English teams toured the West Indies under A A Priestley and Lord Hawke
- A Philadelphian team tours England

England

- County Championship – Lancashire
- Minor Counties Championship – Worcestershire
- Most runs – Bobby Abel 2099 @ 44.65 (HS 250)
- Most wickets – Tom Richardson 273 @ 14.45 (BB 8–49)
- Wisden Five Cricketers of the Year – Frederick Bull, Willis Cuttell, Frank Druce, Gilbert Jessop, Jack Mason

Australia

- Sheffield Shield – New South Wales
- Most runs – Jack Lyons 404 @ 57.71 (HS 113)
- Most wickets – Tom McKibbin 44 @ 14.88 (BB 8–74)

India

- Bombay Presidency – Europeans

South Africa

- Currie Cup – Western Province

West Indies

- Inter-Colonial Tournament – Barbados

== Figure skating ==
World Figure Skating Championships

- World Men's Champion – Gustav Hügel (Austria)

== Golf ==
Major tournaments

- British Open – Harold Hilton
- U.S. Open – Joe Lloyd

Other tournaments

- British Amateur – Jack Allan
- US Amateur – H. J. Whigham

== Horse racing ==
England

- Grand National – Manifesto
- 1,000 Guineas Stakes – Chelandry
- 2,000 Guineas Stakes – Galtee More
- The Derby – Galtee More
- The Oaks – Limasol
- St. Leger Stakes – Galtee More

Australia

- Melbourne Cup – Gaulus

Canada

- Queen's Plate – Ferdinand

Ireland

- Irish Grand National – Breemount's Pride
- Irish Derby Stakes – Wales

USA

- Kentucky Derby – Typhoon II
- Preakness Stakes – Paul Kauvar
- Belmont Stakes – Scottish Chieftain

== Ice hockey ==
Stanley Cup

- Montreal Victorias win a 3rd Stanley Cup, defeating Ottawa.

== Motor racing ==
Nice Speed Week

- The first regular motor racing venue is Nice, France, where an annual "Speed Week" is established. To fill out the schedule, most types of racing event are invented here including the first hill climb, from Nice to La Turbie, and a sprint that has been called the forerunner of drag racing.

== Rowing ==
The Boat Race

- 3 April — Oxford wins the 54th Oxford and Cambridge Boat Race

== Rugby league ==
England

- Championship – not contested
- Challenge Cup final – Batley 10–3 St. Helens at Headingley Rugby Stadium, Leeds. This is the inaugural competition.
- Lancashire League Championship – Broughton Rangers
- Yorkshire League Championship – Brighouse Rovers

== Rugby union ==
Home Nations Championship

- 15th Home Nations Championship series is not completed

== Speed skating ==
Speed Skating World Championships

- Men's All-round Champion – Jack McCulloch (Canada)

== Tennis ==
Events

- The inaugural French women's singles championship is held.

England

- Wimbledon Men's Singles Championship – Reginald Doherty (GB) defeats Harold Mahony (Ireland) 6–4 6–4 6–3
- Wimbledon Women's Singles Championship – Blanche Bingley Hillyard (GB) defeats Charlotte Cooper Sterry (GB) 5–7 7–5 6–2

France

- French Men's Singles Championship – Paul Aymé defeats Francky Wardan (GB) 4–6 6–4 6–2
- French Women's Singles Championship – Françoise Masson (France) defeats P. Girod (France) 6–3 6–1

USA

- American Men's Singles Championship – Robert Wrenn (USA) defeats Wilberforce Eaves (GB) 4–6 8–6 6–3 2–6 6–2
- American Women's Singles Championship – Juliette Atkinson (USA) defeats Elisabeth Moore (USA) 6–3 6–3 4–6 3–6 6–3
