= 1898 in sports =

1898 in sports describes the year's events in world sport.

== American football ==
College championship

- College football national championship – Harvard Crimson

Professional championships

- Western Pennsylvania champions – Duquesne Country and Athletic Club

Events

- The Morgan Athletic Club, which will eventually become Arizona Cardinals, is founded in Chicago and is the sport's oldest professional team.
- 3 December — the Western Pennsylvania All-Stars are defeated by the Duquesne Country and Athletic Club, 16–0, in the very first all-star game for professional football.

== Association football ==
Belgium

- Standard Liège was founded.

England

- The Football League – Sheffield United 42 points, Sunderland 37, Wolves 35, Everton 35, Sheffield Wednesday 33, Aston Villa 33
- FA Cup final – Nottingham Forest 3–1 Derby County at Crystal Palace, London.
- Both the Football League First and Second Divisions are expanded from 16 to 18 teams in 1898, bringing the total number of League sides to 36. Additionally, the test match system is abandoned in favour of automatic relegation and promotion. There is no relegation from the First Division in 1898, Burnley and Newcastle United being promoted to increase the number of teams to 18. To increase the size of the Second Division, Burslem Port Vale is restored to the League; Barnsley, Glossop (1898–1915) and New Brighton Tower (1898–1901) are elected for the first time.

Italy

- Formation of the Italian Football Federation (Federazione Italiana Giuoco Calcio or FIGC) in Turin. It is also known as Federcalcio.

Scotland

- Scottish Football League – Celtic
- Scottish Cup – Rangers 2–0 Kilmarnock at Hampden Park

== Athletics ==
- USA Outdoor Track and Field Championships
- Ronald J. MacDonald wins the second running of the Boston Marathon.

== Australian rules football ==
VFL Premiership

- Fitzroy wins the 2nd VFL Premiership: Fitzroy 5.8 (38) d Essendon 3.5 (23) at Junction Oval

SANFL Premiership

- South Adelaide

WAFL Premiership

- Fremantle

== Baseball ==
National championship

- National League championship – Boston Beaneaters. This is Boston's fifth championship in eight years under manager Frank Selee.

Events

- 22 April — multiple no-hitters are thrown on the same day by two players: Ted Breitenstein and Jay Hughes.

== Basketball ==
USA

- 23 April – The 23rd Street YMCA of New York City wins the first national basketball championship tournament, organized by the U.S. Amateur Athletic Union (AAU).

== Boxing ==
Lineal world champions

- World Heavyweight Championship – Bob Fitzsimmons
- World Middleweight Championship – vacant → Tommy Ryan
- World Welterweight Championship – Tommy Ryan → Ryan vacates title → "Mysterious" Billy Smith
- World Lightweight Championship – George "Kid" Lavigne
- World Featherweight Championship – Solly Smith → Dave Sullivan → George Dixon
- World Bantamweight Championship – Jimmy Barry

== Canadian Football ==
- Ontario Rugby Football Union - Ottawa Rough Riders
- Quebec Rugby Football Union - Ottawa College
- Manitoba Rugby Football Union - St John's
- Intercollegiate Rugby Football Union - University of Toronto
- Dominion Championship - Ottawa Rough Riders defeat Ottawa College 11-1

== Cricket ==
England

- County Championship – Yorkshire
- Minor Counties Championship – Worcestershire
- Most runs – Bobby Abel 2053 @ 48.88 (HS 219)
- Most wickets – Jack Hearne 222 @ 14.05 (BB 9–68)
- Wisden Five Cricketers of the Year – Wilfred Rhodes, Bill Storer, Charlie Townsend, Albert Trott, William Lockwood

Australia

- Sheffield Shield – Victoria
- Most runs – Clem Hill 1196 @ 66.44 (HS 200)
- Most wickets – Ernie Jones 76 @ 21.75 (BB 7–80)

India

- Bombay Presidency – Parsees

South Africa

- Currie Cup – Griqualand West

West Indies

- Inter-Colonial Tournament – not contested

== Figure skating ==
World Figure Skating Championships

- World Men's Champion – Henning Grenander (Sweden)

== Golf ==
Major tournaments

- British Open – Harry Vardon
- U.S. Open – Fred Herd

Other tournaments

- British Amateur – Freddie Tait
- US Amateur – Findlay S. Douglas

== Horse racing ==
Events

- 11 June — Willie Simms becomes the only African-American jockey to win all three races of the United States Triple Crown Races when he rides Sly Fox to victory in the Preakness Stakes.

England

- Grand National – Drogheda
- 1,000 Guineas Stakes – Nun Nicer
- 2,000 Guineas Stakes – Disraeli
- The Derby – Jeddah
- The Oaks – Airs and Graces
- St. Leger Stakes – Wildfowler

Australia

- Melbourne Cup – The Grafter

Canada

- Queen's Plate – Bon Ino

Ireland

- Irish Grand National – Porridge
- Irish Derby Stakes – Noble Howard

USA

- Kentucky Derby – Plaudit
- Preakness Stakes – Sly Fox
- Belmont Stakes – Bowling Brook

== Ice hockey ==
Stanley Cup

- 5 March — Montreal Victorias wins the Amateur Hockey Association of Canada (AHAC) championship and the Stanley Cup. It is the club's fourth AHAC championship in a row and second straight Cup title.

Events

- 10 December — first championship ice hockey league, the Amateur Hockey Association of Canada (AHAC) disbands over a dispute to allow a new member in its senior league. The Canadian Amateur Hockey League (CAHL) is formed to replace it, from the clubs seceding from AHAC.

== Motor racing ==
Paris-Amsterdam-Paris Trail

- The 1898 Paris–Amsterdam–Paris Trail is run on 7–13 July over 1431 km and won by Fernand Charron driving a Panhard-Levassor in a time of 33:04:34. The race is in retrospect sometimes referred to as the III Grand Prix de l'ACF.

== Rowing ==
The Boat Race

- 26 March — Oxford wins the 55th Oxford and Cambridge Boat Race

== Rugby league ==
Events

- Dewsbury RLFC founded

England

- Championship – not contested
- Challenge Cup final – Batley 7–0 Bradford F.C. at Headingley Rugby Stadium, Leeds
- Lancashire League Championship – Oldham
- Yorkshire League Championship – Hunslet

== Rugby union ==
Home Nations Championship

- 16th Home Nations Championship series is not completed

Events

- London Irish founded

== Speed skating ==
Speed Skating World Championships

- Men's All-round Champion – Peder Østlund (Norway)

== Tennis ==
England

- Wimbledon Men's Singles Championship – Reginald Doherty (GB) defeats Laurence Doherty (GB) 6–3 6–3 2–6 5–7 6–1
- Wimbledon Women's Singles Championship – Charlotte Cooper Sterry (GB) defeats Louisa Martin (GB) 6–4 6–4

France

- French Men's Singles Championship – Paul Aymé (France) defeats Paul Lebreton (France): details unknown
- French Women's Singles Championship – Françoise Masson (France) wins: details unknown

USA

- American Men's Singles Championship – Malcolm Whitman (USA) defeats Dwight F. Davis (USA) 3–6 6–2 6–2 6–1
- American Women's Singles Championship – Juliette Atkinson (USA) defeats Marion Jones (USA) 6–3 5–7 6–4 2–6 7–5
