= 1896–97 Sheffield Shield season =

Australian cricket tournament

1896–97 Sheffield Shield
- Cricket format: First-class
- Tournament format: Double round-robin
- Champions: New South Wales (2nd title)
- Participants: 3
- Matches: 6
- Most runs: Jack Lyons (South Australia) – 404 runs
- Most wickets: Tom McKibbin (New South Wales) – 44 wickets

The 1896–97 Sheffield Shield season was the fifth season of the Sheffield Shield, the domestic first-class cricket competition of Australia. New South Wales won the championship for their second consecutive title.

== Table ==
Team	Pld	W	L	D
New South Wales	4	4	0	0
South Australia	4	1	3	0
Victoria	4	1	3	0

== Fixtures ==
19–23 December 1896
Scorecard

New South Wales	v	South Australia (H)
162 (60.1 overs); Jim Kelly 50; Ernie Jones 5/49 (25.1 overs)		187 (71.1 overs); Jack Lyons 78; Tom McKibbin 7/51 (24.1 overs)
237 (73.4 overs); Monty Noble 69; Arthur Evans 3/59 (20 overs)		161 (53.3 overs); Clem Hill 51; Tom McKibbin 8/74 (23.3 overs)

New South Wales won by 51 runs
Adelaide Oval, Adelaide
Umpires: Isaac Fisher and J. W. Evers

- New South Wales won the toss and elected to bat.

26–30 December 1896
Scorecard

New South Wales	v	Victoria (H)
312 (124 overs); Syd Gregory 68; Hugh Trumble 5/89 (34 overs)		99 (33.1 overs); Harry Graham 34; Tom McKibbin 5/47 (17.1 overs)
1/8 (7.3 overs); Frank Iredale 4* Harry Trott 1/4 (4 overs)		220 f/o (89.4 overs); Charlie McLeod 78; Arthur Coningham 6/38 (22 overs)

New South Wales won by 9 wickets
Melbourne Cricket Ground, Melbourne
Umpires: Jim Phillips and J. W. Evers

- New South Wales won the toss and elected to bat.

1–5 January 1897
Scorecard

(H) Victoria	v	South Australia
354 (111.4 overs); James O'Halloran 128*; Ernie Jones 6/122 (51 overs)		239 (86.4 overs); Jack Lyons 70; Hugh Trumble 3/59 (27.4 overs)
230 (68.5 overs); Hugh Trumble 82; Ernie Jones 6/84 (34 overs)		296 (103.3 overs); Jack Lyons 110; Hugh Trumble 4/83 (34.3 overs)

Victoria won by 49 runs
Melbourne Cricket Ground, Melbourne
Umpires: Jim Phillips and Philip Argall

- Victoria won the toss and elected to bat.

8–11 January 1897
Scorecard

South Australia	v	New South Wales (H)
159 (56.5 overs); Clem Hill 42; Bill Howell 6/40 (20 overs)		420 (117.4 overs); Tom Garrett 131; Ernie Jones 8/157 (51 overs)
250 (93.3 overs); George Giffen 104*; Arthur Coningham 4/69 (27 overs)

New South Wales won by an innings and 11 runs
Sydney Cricket Ground, Sydney
Umpires: John Thompson and Philip Argall

- South Australia won the toss and elected to bat.

23–28 January 1897
Scorecard

(H) New South Wales	v	Victoria
159 (64.1 overs); Monty Noble 71; Mickey Roche 6/63 (28.1 overs)		269 (109.2 overs); Harry Trott 104; Tom McKibbin 8/111 (38 overs)
570 (203.1 overs); Monty Noble 153*; Hugh Trumble 2/98 (43 overs)		268 (91.3 overs); Hugh Trumble 58; Tom McKibbin 5/129 (41 overs)

New South Wales won by 192 runs
Sydney Cricket Ground, Sydney
Umpires: Jim Phillips and John Thompson

- New South Wales won the toss and elected to bat.

26 February – 1 March 1897
Scorecard

Victoria	v	South Australia (H)
279 (109.5 overs); Harry Trott 61; George Giffen 4/71 (31 overs)		427 (122.5 overs); Jack Lyons 113; Jack Worrall 5/68 (24 overs)
78 (53.2 overs); James Giller 24*; Arthur Carracher 5/24 (21 overs)

South Australia won by an innings and 70 runs
Adelaide Oval, Adelaide
Umpires: George Downs and Jim Phillips

- Victoria won the toss and elected to bat.

== Statistics ==
=== Most Runs ===
Jack Lyons 404

=== Most Wickets ===
Tom McKibbin 44
