= 1897 World Allround Speed Skating Championships =

International speed skating competition

World Allround Speed Skating Championships
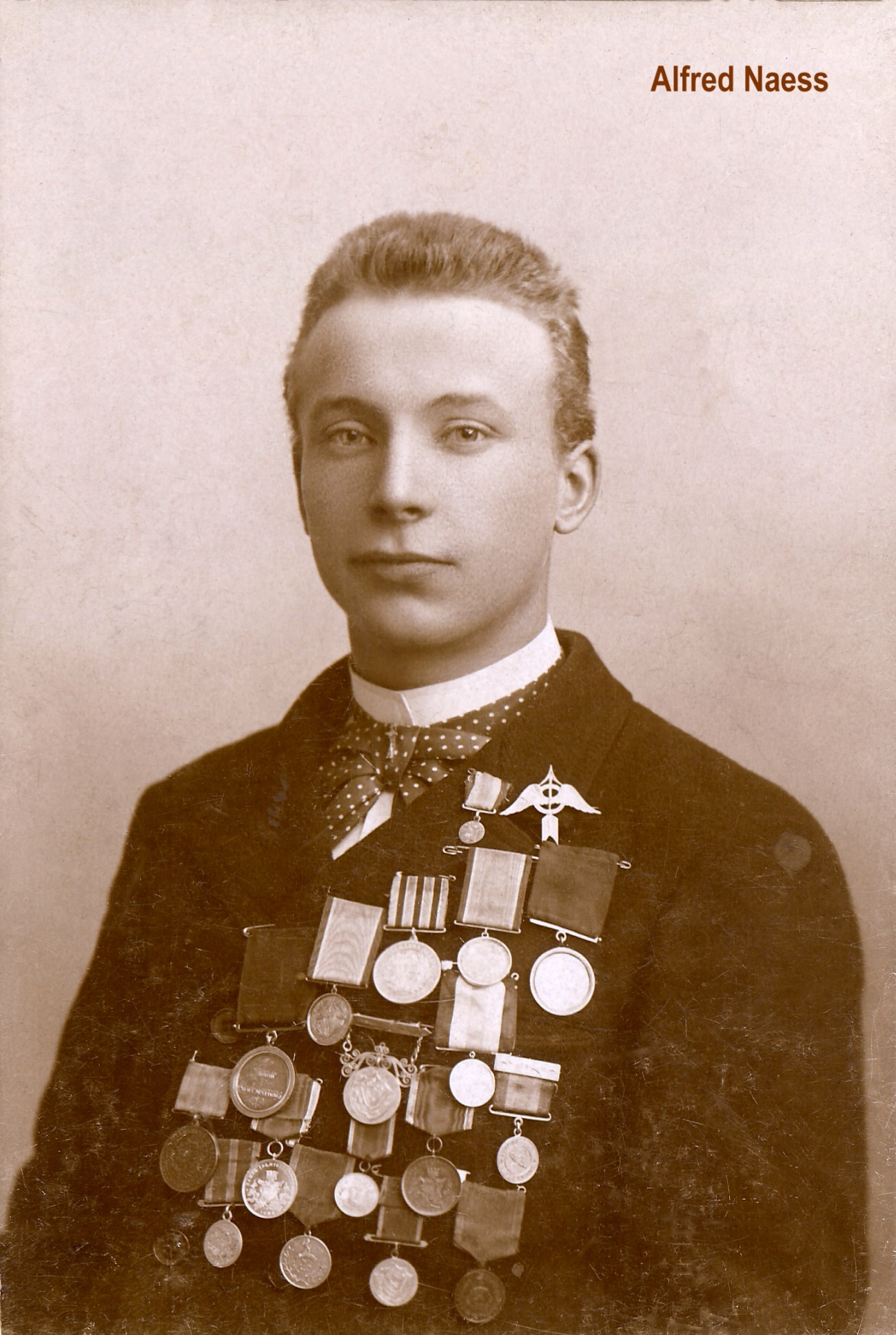
- Alfred Næss; Participant of the 1897 World Championship
- Venue: Crystal Stadium, Montréal, Canada
- Dates: 5, 6 and 9 February
- Competitors: 10 from 3 nations

Medalist men
| 1st place, gold medalist(s) | | Jack McCulloch | CAN |

The 1897 World Allround Speed Skating Championships took place on 5, 6 and 9 February 1897 at the ice rink Crystal Stadium in Montréal, Canada. It was the first World championship outside of Europe. Canada had the honour of organizing this World championship because it was the first non-European member of the International Skating Union.

Jaap Eden was the defending champion, but he stopped with ice skating after the 1896 season and did not defend his title. He started a career as a cyclist.

The Norwegian Alfred Næss won the first distance (500 metres) and the Canadian Jack McCulloch the second distance (5000 metres). At the third distance (1500 metres), Næss and McCulloch dead-heated for the fastest time, meaning a skate-off was needed to decide who was the winner and still able to win three distances.

After McCulloch won the skate-off, he won the 10000 metres, with only three others starting, and became World Champion.

Two days later, officials discovered an error in measuring the 5000 metre course, meaning the competitors had skated 4200 metres: two laps too few.

The results were annulled, and the next morning (9 February), the 5000 metres was re-skated, though some skaters had already left Canada, meaning only four skaters took part. McCulloch won again, and was confirmed as World Champion.

== Allround results ==
| Place | Athlete | Country | 500m | 5000m | 1500m | 1500m Skate-off | 10000m | 5000m Re-skated |
|---|---|---|---|---|---|---|---|---|
| 1st place, gold medalist(s) | Jack McCulloch | Canada | 48.2 (2) | 8:32.8 (1) | 2:42.4 (1) | 2:40.8 (1) | 20:02.4 (1) | 9:25.4 (1) |
| NC2 | John Davidson | Canada | 50.2 (5) | 8:52.6 (3) | 2:47.4 (4) | | 20:43.4 (3) | 10:00.6 (3) |
| NC | Julius Seyler | German Empire | 48.6 (3)* | 8:47.6 (2) | 2:43.2 (3) | | 20:42.2 (2) |
| NC | C. Greene | Canada | 49.2 (4) | 8:52.8 (4) | 2:48.6 (6) | | 21:23.4 (4) |
| NC | Alfred Næss | Norway | 46.8 (1) | 9:01.5 (7) | 2:42.4 (1) | 2:41.2 (2) | NS |
| NC | Martinus Lørdahl | Norway | 50.6 (6)* | 8:55.0 (5) | 2:52.4 (8)* | | NS | 9:39.2 (2) |
| NC | W. Merrit | Canada | 50.8 (7) | 8:57.0 (6) | 2:52.0 (7) | | NS |
| NC | Tom Moore | Canada | 50.8 (7) | 9:07.4 (8) | 2:48.2 (5) | | NS |
| NC | A. Lee | Canada | 56.0 (10) | 9:39.2 (10) | 3:08.8 (9) | | NS | NF |
| NC | A. Pilkie | Canada | 53.4 (9) | 9:15.6 (9) | NF | | NS |

* = Fell
NC = Not classified
NF = Not finished
NS = Not started
DQ = Disqualified

Source: SpeedSkatingStats.com

== Rules ==
Four distances have to be skated:

- 500m
- 1500m
- 5000m
- 10000m

One could only win the World Championships by winning at least three of the four distances, so there would be no World Champion if no skater won at least three distances.

Silver and bronze medals were not awarded.
