= 1898 World Allround Speed Skating Championships =

International speed skating competition

World Allround Speed Skating Championships
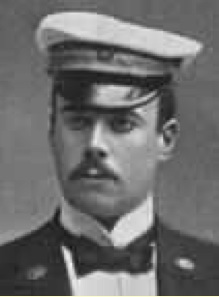
- Gustaf Estlander; Participant of the 1898 World Championship
- Venue: Eisstadion, Davos, Switzerland
- Dates: 6–7 February
- Competitors: 12 from 3 nations

Medalist men
1st place, gold medalist(s)		Peder Østlund	NOR

The 1898 World Allround Speed Skating Championships took place at 6 and 7 February 1898 at the ice rink Eisstadion in Davos, Switzerland.

Jack McCulloch was the defending champion but did not participate.

The Norwegian Peder Østlund won three distances but did not finish the 500 meter. According to the rules he became World champion. The German Julius Seyler who finished all the distances had the best score.

== Allround results ==
Place	Athlete	Country	500m	5000m	1500m	10000m
1st place, gold medalist(s)	Peder Østlund	Norway	NF	8:52.2 (1)	2:23.6 (1)	18:40.0 (1)
NC2	Julius Seyler	German Empire	47.2 (1)	9:14.6 (3)	2:29.2 (2)	18:47.8 (2)
NC3	Gustaf Estlander	Finland	47.6 (3)	9:15.0 (5)	2:29.8 (3)	18:55.8 (3)
NC4	Wilhelm Sensburg	German Empire	50.6 (7)	9:09.6 (2)	2:35.4 (6)	19:19.0 (5)
NC5	Jan Banning	Netherlands	47.8 (4)	9:37.0 (8)	2:34.2 (5)	19:45.2 (6)
NC6	Alfred Lauenburg	German Empire	49.6 (5)	10:12.0 (10)	2:53.4 (10)	21:18.6 (7)
NC	Oskar Fredriksen	Norway	47.4 (2)	9:25.0 (6)	2:31.8 (4)	NS
NC	Nikolay Kryukov	Russia	53.4 (9)	9:28.6 (7)	2:37.0 (8)	NS
NC	István Szabó	Hungary	50.8 (8)	9:40.6 (9)	NF	NS
NC	Eduard Vollenveyder	Russia	50.2 (6)	NS	NS	NS
NC	Jan Greve	Netherlands	NF	9:14.6 (3)	2:38.4 (9)	19:03.6 (4)
NC	Hermann Kleeberg	German Empire	NF	NF	2:36.2 (7)	NS

* = Fell
NC = Not classified
NF = Not finished
NS = Not started
DQ = Disqualified

Source: SpeedSkatingStats.com

== Rules ==
Four distances have to be skated:

- 500m
- 1500m
- 5000m
- 10000m

One could only win the World Championships by winning at least three of the four distances, so there would be no World Champion if no skater won at least three distances.

Silver and bronze medals were not awarded.
