= James O'Halloran =

James O'Halloran may refer to:

- James O'Halloran (politician)
- James O'Halloran (actor)
- James O'Halloran (cricketer)
