= 1897–98 Sheffield Shield season =

Australian cricket tournament

1897–98 Sheffield Shield
- Cricket format: First-class
- Tournament format: Double round-robin
- Champions: Victoria (3rd title)
- Participants: 3
- Matches: 6
- Most runs: Clem Hill (South Australia) – 367 runs
- Most wickets: Ernie Jones (South Australia) – 33 wickets

The 1897–98 Sheffield Shield season was the sixth season of the Sheffield Shield, the domestic first-class cricket competition of Australia. Victoria won the championship.

== Table ==
Team	Pld	W	L	D
Victoria	4	3	1	0
South Australia	4	2	2	0
New South Wales	4	1	3	0

== Fixtures ==
13–17 November 1897
Scorecard

Victoria	v	South Australia (H)
157 (65.4 overs); Sam McMichael 35*; George Giffen 5/69 (32.4 overs)		313 (123.1 overs); Fred Jarvis 92; Mickey Roche 4/59 (29.1 overs)
237 (73.4 overs); Monty Noble 69; Arthur Evans 3/59 (20 overs)		1/78 (30 overs); Alby Green 33*; James Giller 1/8 (5 overs)

South Australia won by 9 wickets
Adelaide Oval, Adelaide
Umpires: Bob Crockett and George Downs

- Victoria won the toss and elected to bat.

27–30 December 1897
Scorecard

(H) Victoria	v	New South Wales
320 (130 overs); Harry Graham 53; Tom McKibbin 4/108 (42 overs)		263 (115.3 overs); Alick Mackenzie 88; Harry Trott 44/4 (24.3 overs)
184 (80.4 overs); Harry Trott 92; Tom McKibbin 4/79 (32 overs)		92 (72 overs); Syd Gregory 17; Mickey Roche 5/51 (37 overs)

Victoria won by 149 runs
Melbourne Cricket Ground, Melbourne
Umpires: Bob Crockett and Jack Tooher

- Victoria won the toss and elected to bat.

8–12 January 1898
Scorecard

New South Wales	v	South Australia (H)
228 (86.5 overs); J. J. Ferris 51; Ernie Jones 5/54 (26.5 overs)		139 (65.4 overs); George Giffen 49; Bill Howell 5/60 (29 overs)
316 (109.4 overs); Harry Donnan 81; Ernie Jones 6/71 (28 overs)		189 (78.1 overs); Joe Darling 74; Monty Noble 4/63 (29 overs)

New South Wales won by 216 runs
Adelaide Oval, Adelaide
Umpires: Jack Tooher and Philip Argall

- New South Wales won the toss and elected to bat.

22–27 January 1898
Scorecard

(H) New South Wales	v	Victoria
273 (124 overs); Syd Gregory 72; Mickey Roche 6/88 (32 overs)		187 (50.3 overs); Jack Worrall 103; Andrew Newell 8/56 (19 overs)
90 (25.2 overs); Harry Donnan 19; Harry Trott 5/21 (8 overs)		7/179 (55 overs); William Bruce 37; Tom McKibbin 4/64 (18 overs)

Victoria won by 3 wickets
Sydney Cricket Ground, Sydney
Umpires: Bob Crockett and Charles Bannerman

- New South Wales won the toss and elected to bat.

11–15 February 1898
Scorecard

(H) Victoria	v	South Australia
428 (128.5 overs); Sam McMichael 97; Arthur Evans 3/110 (28 overs)		394 (104.1 overs); Clem Hill 135; Hugh Trumble 3/120 (28 overs)
112 (40.4 overs); John Stuckey 28; Ernie Jones 4/43 (15 overs)		120 (60 overs); Fred Jarvis 31; Mickey Roche 5/58 (29 overs)

Victoria won by 26 runs
Melbourne Cricket Ground, Melbourne
Umpires: Bob Crockett and George Downs

- Victoria won the toss and elected to bat.

18–22 February 1898
Scorecard

South Australia	v	New South Wales (H)
289 (88.5 overs); Joe Darling 75; Monty Noble 4/95 (36 overs)		310 (80.2 overs); Syd Gregory 83; Ernie Jones 6/140 (35 overs)
442 (125 overs); Clem Hill 170; Monty Noble 4/164 (42 overs)		126 (37.5 overs); Monty Noble 38; Ernie Jones 5/62 (19 overs)

South Australia won by 295 runs
Sydney Cricket Ground, Sydney
Umpires: Charles Bannerman and George Downs

- South Australia won the toss and elected to bat.

== Statistics ==
=== Most Runs ===
Clem Hill 367

=== Most Wickets ===
Ernie Jones 33
