= Sunflower Showdown =

American college sports rivalry

- Kansas Kansas State
- Sport: Multiple
- First meeting: 1898 (baseball)
- Trophy: Governor's Cup (football)

Locations of Kansas and Kansas State.

The Sunflower Showdown is the series of athletic contests between Kansas State University and the University of Kansas athletic programs, most notably football and men's basketball. The name is derived from a nickname for the state of Kansas as well as the state flower, the Sunflower State.

The two schools compete each year for the Governor's Cup in football. The football series dates back to 1902, and has been played every year since 1911, making it the fourth-longest active series in NCAA college football. (Note: The three longer active series are: Lafayette–Lehigh (since 1897); Oklahoma–Oklahoma State (since 1910), and Wake Forest–North Carolina State (since 1910).) The University of Kansas built a large advantage in the series by 1923, and leads the overall series 64–54–5 or 65–53–5 (depending on whether a 1980 forfeit by KU is counted) as of the end of the 2025 season. Currently, Kansas State has won 18 straight against Kansas, spanning from 2009–2025, the longest win streak by either school in the history of the Sunflower Showdown. On October 17, 2026 it will have been 6,560 days since Kansas has beat Kansas State and 7,290 days since Kansas posted a win at Bill Snyder Family Stadium.

The men's basketball series dates back to 1907, and is the most-played series in either school's history, and the sixth-most-played in NCAA history. Kansas has dominated the all-time series and leads the men's basketball series 207–96 following the most recent game on January 24, 2026. This is the most victories by one school over another in NCAA Division I men's basketball. Kansas has led in the all-time series since 1922, and since 1984, Kansas leads the series 88–15.

In football and men's basketball, despite some competitiveness in the rivalries in the past, both sports have dominated by one team in the rivalry since 1990. In football, Kansas State is 30–6 since 1990. In men's basketball, Kansas is 73–10, excluding three vacated wins.

In 2010, Dillons bought the naming rights and the series was re-branded "The Dillon's Sunflower Showdown".

== Origins ==
Charles Robinson

The rivalry between the two schools can be traced indirectly back to their creation in the 1860s. The towns of Manhattan, Kansas (now home to KSU) and Lawrence, Kansas (now home to KU) both competed to be the site of the state University – required in the Kansas Constitution – after Kansas achieved statehood in 1861. Manhattan would have become the home of the university in 1861, but the bill establishing the University in Manhattan was controversially vetoed by Governor Charles L. Robinson of Lawrence. An attempt to override the veto in the Legislature failed by two votes. In 1862, another bill to make Manhattan the site of the University failed by one vote. Finally, on the third attempt, on February 16, 1863, the Kansas Legislature designated Manhattan as home to the state's Land-grant university. Yet the legislature was not done. Prodded by former Governor Robinson, the Legislature distinguished this institution from the "University" in the Constitution, and on February 20 the Legislature named Lawrence as the home to the state university (provided Lawrence could raise $15,000 and acquire not less than 40 acres (160,000 m^{2}) of land). When Lawrence met these conditions, the University of Kansas was established there in 1865.

The first recorded meeting between the two institutions in athletic competition was a little more than thirty years after their founding, in a baseball game in 1898.

== Football ==
Kansas–Kansas State football rivalry
- Teams: Kansas Jayhawks; Kansas State Wildcats
- First meeting: October 4, 1902; Kansas 16, Kansas State 0
- Latest meeting: October 17, 2026; Kansas State 35, Kansas 24
- Next meeting: 2027
- Trophy: Governor's Cup

Statistics
- Total meetings: 124
- All-time series: Kansas leads, 65–54–5 (per Kansas); Kansas leads, 64–55–5 (per Kansas State)
- Largest victory: Kansas State, 64–0 (2002)
- Longest win streak: Kansas State, 18 (2009–present)
- Current win streak: Kansas State, 18 (2009–present)

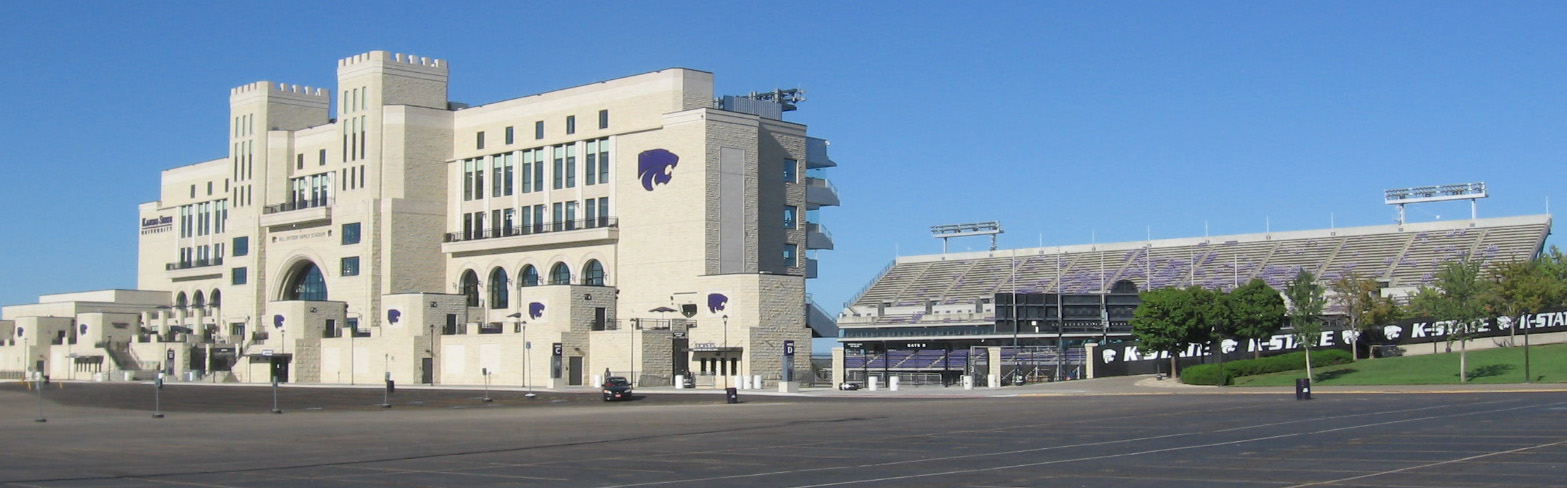
Bill Snyder Family Football Stadium at Kansas State

=== History ===
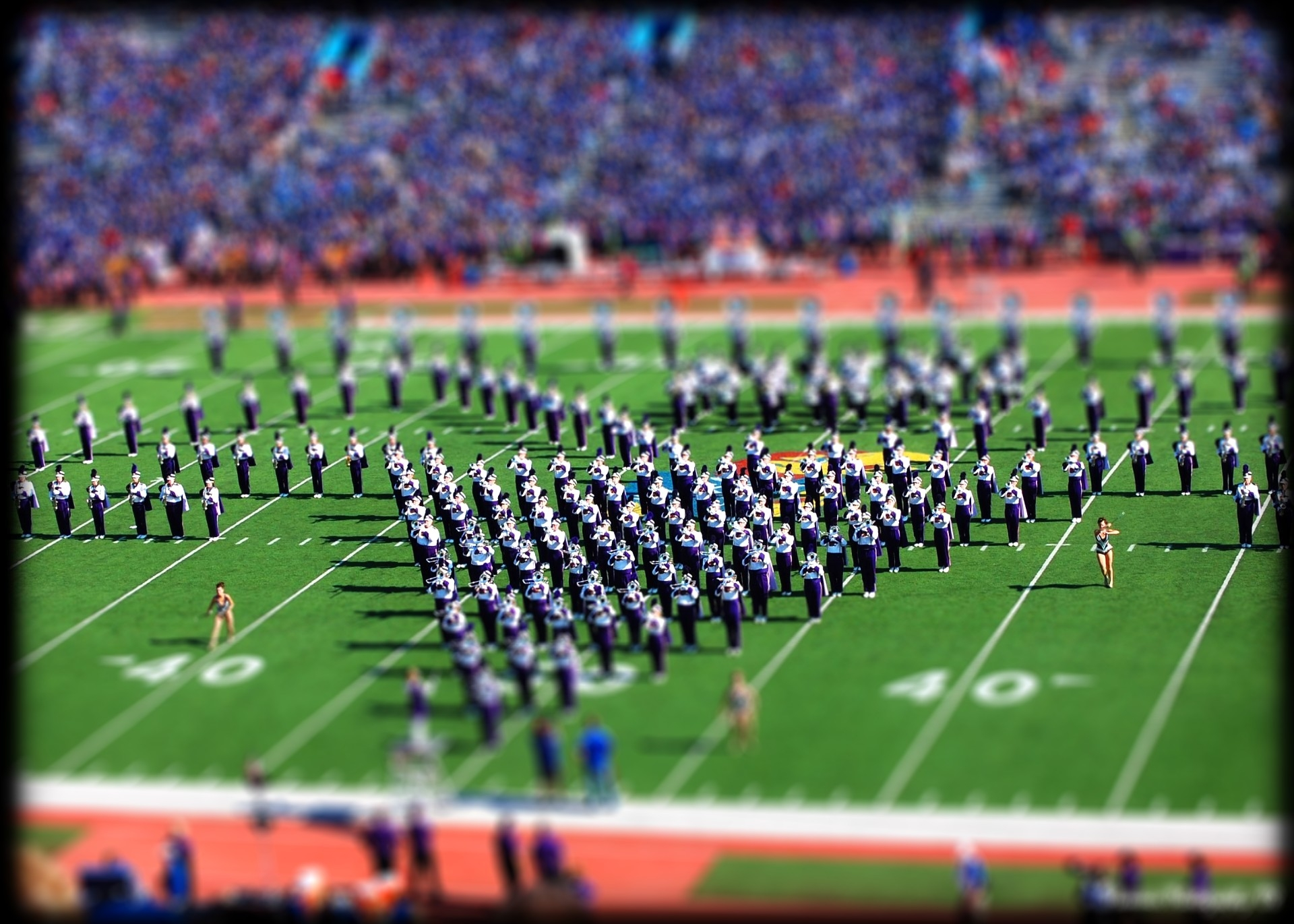
The KSU Marching Band performs at halftime of the Sunflower Showdown in Lawrence in 2008. Kansas won the game 52-21

The two teams had a very long history prior to the inauguration of the Governor's Cup: they began play in 1902, with only a single interruption in 1910, and have now faced each other every season since 1911, making this the fifth-longest continuous series in college football history. The four longer active series are these: Lafayette–Lehigh (since 1897), Minnesota–Wisconsin (since 1906), Oklahoma–Oklahoma State (since 1910), and North Carolina State–Wake Forest (since 1910). It is the second-longest rivalry between two public universities in the same state featuring the names "University of _ vs. _ State University" (behind Oregon–Oregon State).

The two schools disagree on the overall series record, though both agree KU leads the series. The difference arises from the 1980 game, which KU won 20–18 on the field. However, the Big Eight Conference ordered KU to forfeit the game after a player was ruled ineligible. As a result, KU claims to lead the overall series 65–53–5, and KSU reports that KU leads 64–54–5. KU cites NCAA policy to explain its refusal to recognize the 1980 game as a KSU win. The policy states that NCAA schools must acknowledge forfeits imposed by the NCAA or those dictated by the rules of the game, without specifically referencing conference-imposed penalties.

The Governor's Cup is the third trophy associated with the rivalry. In 1902, in the first match-up, a "Governor's Trophy" was given to the winning team. Then, beginning in the 1940 football season, the winner of the KU–KSU contest received the "Peace Pact Trophy", which was miniature bronze goalposts. The trophy was intended to keep the winning team's student body from tearing down the loser's goalposts. These trophies were forgotten in time.

The series was largely dominated by Kansas until 1992 with the Jayhawks owning a 61–24–5 lead through the 1992 season. Since 1993, the Wildcats have dominated the series with a 29–4 record including an active 18 game win streak, the longest by either team in the series history.

=== Series overview ===
Statistic	Kansas	Kansas State
Games played	124	
Wins	64	55
Ties	5 (1916, '22, '23, '66, '87)	
Disputed	1 (1980)	
Home wins	37	31
Road wins	28	23
Total points scored in the series	2162	2034
Most points scored in a game by one team	55 (1947)	64 (2002)
Most points scored in a game by both teams	80 (2011 – KSU 59, KU 21)	
Fewest points scored in a game by both teams	0 (1916, 1923)	
Fewest points scored in a game by one team in a win	5 (1909)	6 (4 times)
Most points scored in a game by one team in a loss	27 (2022, 2023, 2024)	29 (1968)
Largest margin of victory	55 (1947)	64 (2002)
Longest winning streak	10 (1956–65)	18 (2009–present)

=== Notable games ===
==== 1910: The cancelled game ====
Kansas and Kansas State have played each other in football every year since 1902, except for 1910. The 1910 game was cancelled after the two teams were unable to agree to eligibility rules for the contest. KU coach A. R. Kennedy tried to compel Kansas State to play the game by publishing provocative comments in the Lawrence newspaper in May 1910, but Kansas State coach Mike Ahearn refused to change his school's rules.

==== 1927–1933: Road wins ====
For seven straight years, from 1927 to 1933, the two teams alternated wins, with the visiting team winning every game in contrast to the usual home field advantage in sports. In the six games from 1928 to 1933, every game was also won by shutout. The streak was ended when KSU won at home in 1934 (another shutout).

==== 1969: First Governor's Cup game ====
Kansas State won the first contest in the Governor's Cup series 26–22 on October 11, 1969, in Lawrence, Kansas. The game was a classic in the series, contested by two high-quality teams. Kansas was coming off an appearance in the Orange Bowl the previous season, led by future Pro Football Hall of Fame running back John Riggins, while Kansas State in 1969 was an offensive juggernaut led by quarterback Lynn Dickey and running back Mack Herron. The game was not decided until the final play, when two K-State defenders jarred the ball loose from a KU receiver in the end zone. The loss sent KU's season into an irreversible tailspin, and the Jayhawks, suffering greatly from the loss of Bobby Douglass and John Zook to the NFL, finished the season 1–9, culminating with a 69-21 loss to Big Eight Conference champion Missouri at home.

Following the game, Kansas State fans tore down the goalposts in KU's stadium – an act with a long history in the rivalry, and that K-State fans would repeat in 1994 after ending an 11-game losing streak in Lawrence.

==== 1980: The forfeit ====
On November 1, 1980, Kansas defeated Kansas State 20–18 in Manhattan, Kansas to take a 9–3 lead in the first dozen years the Governor's Cup was awarded. However, it was later determined that Kerwin Bell, a running back for Kansas in that game, was a partial qualifier despite his high school transcripts indicating otherwise and he was ruled academically ineligible at the time of the 1980 season. In 1982 the Big Eight Conference ordered Kansas to forfeit three conference wins and one tie from the 1980 season, including its victory in the 1980 Governor's Cup game. As a result, the two schools now dispute the overall record in both the Sunflower Showdown and more recent Governor's Cup series, with each school claiming victory in the 1980 game.

==== 1987: The Toilet Bowl ====
The lone tie during the Governor's Cup era took place on November 7, 1987, in Manhattan, and is the most infamous game in the history of the series. Dubbed "The Toilet Bowl" and "The Futility Bowl" by national commentators, the game featured 1–7 KU and 0–8 K-State; the contest lived down to expectations and resulted in a 17–17 tie, which was secured when Kansas blocked a field goal as time expired.

Following the tie, both teams lost their last two games of the season, with KU coach Bob Valesente being fired following the season. While his counterpart, Stan Parrish, kept his job, he was fired in 1988 after the Wildcats posted a 0–11 season to extend their winless streak to 26 games. Parrish's firing led to the hiring of Bill Snyder, who would shift the direction of the series in favor of the Wildcats and built them into a powerhouse.

==== 1995: Two ranked teams ====
The first match-up in history of the rivalry while both teams were ranked occurred on October 28, 1995, in Manhattan. The University of Kansas came into the game 7–0 and ranked #6 in the AP Poll, while Kansas State University was 5–1 and ranked #14. Both teams would finish the season ranked in the top ten, but this day belonged to Kansas State. KSU started strong and maintained the advantage throughout for a decisive 41–7 victory.

==== 2002: 64–0 ====
Kansas State, 6–2 and ranked #14 in the AP Poll, routed Kansas in the largest margin of victory in the series by either team, 64–0, in Lawrence. The Wildcats built a 30–0 lead at the end of the 1st quarter and lead 43–0 at halftime. Wildcat quarterback Ell Roberson ran for 3 touchdowns and threw for another as the Wildcats outgained the Jayhawks 494–115. The Jayhawks also committed 7 turnovers in the loss. KSU went on to finish the season 11–2 and beat Arizona State in the Holiday Bowl, while the Jayhawks, under first year head coach Mark Mangino, finished the season at 2–10 and winless in conference play.

==== 2004: Streak buster ====
An 11-year winning streak by KSU that began in 1993 – at that time, the 2nd longest by either team in the series – was broken on October 9, 2004, when KU won a back-and-forth 31–28 thriller in Lawrence. The head coach of the Jayhawks was Mark Mangino, a former Wildcat assistant under KSU coach Bill Snyder. Mangino bested his mentor in Snyder's final visit to Memorial Stadium during Snyder's first term as KSU coach.

==== 2007: KU wins in Manhattan ====
In 2007, KU won in Manhattan for the first time since 1989 (as of the end of the 2024 season, KU has not won in Manhattan since 2007), and also posted its only victory over a ranked KSU team. KU entered the game 4–0 while KSU had a 3–1 record, but KSU was favored in the contest and ranked 24th in the AP Poll. Kansas overcame several mistakes through the course of the first half, tying the contest 14–14 at halftime. Following a strong second-half performance by KU, the visitors from Lawrence posted a 30–24 victory. KU went on to build an 11–0 record on the season before losing to Missouri, and secured an at-large bid to the 2008 Orange Bowl.

==== 2010: A century straight ====
For the 100th consecutive season, KU and KSU faced each other on the football field on October 14, 2010, in Lawrence. It was only the seventh college football rivalry in history played for a century straight. (Other series have subsequently reached the mark of 100 straight years or more.) The game was the second since Bill Snyder returned to coach KSU and was reminiscent of earlier blowout Wildcat victories during Snyder's first tenure, with KSU claiming a 59–7 victory over KU.

==== 2023: First ranked matchup in 28 years ====
The 2023 edition of the Sunflower Showdown was played in Lawrence and featured both teams being ranked for the first time since 1995 and the first time ever in the College Football Playoff poll era. Kansas entered the game ranked No. 25 in the College Football Playoff poll while Kansas State was No. 21. Both teams were 7–3 entering the game. Kansas State won the back-and-forth game 31–27.

=== Game results ===
Kansas victories	Kansas State victories	Tie games

No.	Date	Location	Winner	Score
1	October 7, 1902	Lawrence	Kansas	16–0
2	October 3, 1903	Lawrence	Kansas	34–0
3	November 18, 1904	Manhattan	Kansas	41–4
4	November 25, 1905	Lawrence	Kansas	28–0
5	November 23, 1906	Manhattan	Kansas State	6–4
6	October 26, 1907	Lawrence	Kansas	29–10
7	October 10, 1908	Lawrence	Kansas	12–6
8	October 16, 1909	Manhattan	Kansas	5–3
9	October 21, 1911	Manhattan	Kansas	6–0
10	October 26, 1912	Lawrence	Kansas	19–6
11	October 25, 1913	Manhattan	Kansas	26–0
12	October 24, 1914	Lawrence	Kansas	27–0
13	October 23, 1915	Manhattan	Kansas	19–7
14	October 28, 1916	Lawrence	Tie	0–0
15	November 3, 1917	Manhattan	Kansas	9–0
16	November 28, 1918	Lawrence	Kansas	13–7
17	November 1, 1919	Lawrence	Kansas	16–3
18	October 30, 1920	Manhattan	Kansas	14–0
19	October 29, 1921	Lawrence	Kansas	21–7
20	October 28, 1922	Manhattan	Tie	7–7
21	October 27, 1923	Lawrence	Tie	0–0
22	October 18, 1924	Manhattan	Kansas State	6–0
23	October 17, 1925	Lawrence	Kansas State	14–7
24	October 16, 1926	Manhattan	Kansas State	27–0
25	October 15, 1927	Lawrence	Kansas State	13–2
26	October 20, 1928	Manhattan	Kansas	7–0
27	October 19, 1929	Lawrence	Kansas State	6–0
28	October 18, 1930	Manhattan	Kansas	14–0
29	October 17, 1931	Lawrence	Kansas State	13–0
30	November 19, 1932	Manhattan	Kansas	19–0
31	October 28, 1933	Lawrence	Kansas State	6–0
32	October 20, 1934	Manhattan	Kansas State	13–0
33	October 26, 1935	Lawrence	Kansas	9–2
34	October 24, 1936	Manhattan	Kansas State	26–6
35	November 13, 1937	Lawrence	Kansas State	7–0
36	October 29, 1938	Manhattan	Kansas	27–7
37	November 4, 1939	Lawrence	Kansas State	27–6
38	October 26, 1940	Manhattan	Kansas State	20–0
39	November 15, 1941	Lawrence	Kansas	20–16
40	October 24, 1942	Manhattan	Kansas	19–7
41	October 30, 1943	Lawrence	Kansas	25–2
42	November 11, 1944	Manhattan	Kansas State	24–18
43	November 17, 1945	Lawrence	Kansas	27–0
44	November 16, 1946	Manhattan	Kansas	34–0
45	November 1, 1947	Lawrence	Kansas	55–0
46	November 13, 1948	Manhattan	Kansas	20–14
47	October 29, 1949	Lawrence	Kansas	38–0
48	November 18, 1950	Manhattan	Kansas	47–7
49	October 27, 1951	Lawrence	Kansas	33–14
50	November 1, 1952	Manhattan	No. 9 Kansas	26–6
51	November 7, 1953	Lawrence	Kansas State	7–0
52	October 30, 1954	Manhattan	Kansas State	28–6
53	November 5, 1955	Lawrence	Kansas State	46–0
54	November 3, 1956	Manhattan	Kansas	20–15
55	November 9, 1957	Lawrence	Kansas	13–7
56	November 1, 1958	Manhattan	Kansas	21–12
57	October 17, 1959	Lawrence	Kansas	33–14
58	September 24, 1960	Manhattan	Kansas	41–0
59	November 11, 1961	Lawrence	Kansas	34–0
60	November 3, 1962	Manhattan	Kansas	38–0
61	November 2, 1963	Lawrence	Kansas	34–0
62	October 31, 1964	Manhattan	Kansas	7–0
63	October 30, 1965	Lawrence	Kansas	34–0

No.	Date	Location	Winner	Score
64	October 29, 1966	Manhattan	Tie	3–3
65	November 4, 1967	Lawrence	Kansas	17–16
66	November 16, 1968	Manhattan	No. 7 Kansas	38–29
67	October 11, 1969	Lawrence	Kansas State	26–22
68	October 10, 1970	Manhattan	Kansas	21–15
69	October 9, 1971	Lawrence	Kansas	39–13
70	October 13, 1972	Manhattan	Kansas State	20–19
71	October 13, 1973	Lawrence	No. 19 Kansas	25–18
72	October 12, 1974	Manhattan	No. 19 Kansas	20–13
73	November 1, 1975	Lawrence	Kansas	28–0
74	October 23, 1976	Manhattan	Kansas	24–14
75	November 5, 1977	Lawrence	Kansas	29–21
76	November 18, 1978	Manhattan	Kansas State	36–20
77	November 3, 1979	Lawrence	Kansas	36–28
78	November 1, 1980	Manhattan	Kansas†	20–18†
79	October 24, 1981	Lawrence	Kansas	17–14
80	October 23, 1982	Manhattan	Kansas State	36–7
81	October 15, 1983	Lawrence	Kansas	31–3
82	October 12, 1984	Manhattan	Kansas State	24–7
83	October 19, 1985	Lawrence	Kansas	38–7
84	October 18, 1986	Manhattan	Kansas State	29–12
85	November 7, 1987	Manhattan	Tie	17–17
86	November 5, 1988	Lawrence	Kansas	30–12
87	October 28, 1989	Manhattan	Kansas	21–16
88	October 27, 1990	Lawrence	Kansas	27–24
89	October 12, 1991	Manhattan	Kansas State	16–12
90	October 10, 1992	Lawrence	Kansas	31–7
91	October 9, 1993	Manhattan	Kansas State	10–9
92	October 6, 1994	Lawrence	No. 19 Kansas State	21–13
93	October 28, 1995	Manhattan	No. 14 Kansas State	41–7
94	November 9, 1996	Lawrence	No. 13 Kansas State	38–12
95	November 8, 1997	Manhattan	No. 11 Kansas State	48–16
96	October 31, 1998	Lawrence	No. 3 Kansas State	54–6
97	October 9, 1999	Manhattan	No. 9 Kansas State	50–9
98	October 7, 2000	Lawrence	No. 4 Kansas State	52–13
99	October 27, 2001	Manhattan	Kansas State	40–6
100	November 2, 2002	Lawrence	No. 14 Kansas State	64–0
101	October 25, 2003	Manhattan	Kansas State	42–6
102	October 9, 2004	Lawrence	Kansas	31–28
103	October 8, 2005	Manhattan	Kansas State	12–3
104	November 18, 2006	Lawrence	Kansas	39–20
105	October 7, 2007	Manhattan	Kansas	30–24
106	November 1, 2008	Lawrence	Kansas	52–21
107	November 7, 2009	Manhattan	Kansas State	17–10
108	October 14, 2010	Lawrence	Kansas State	59–7
109	October 22, 2011	Lawrence	No. 12 Kansas State	59–21
110	October 6, 2012	Manhattan	No. 7 Kansas State	56–16
111	November 30, 2013	Lawrence	Kansas State	31–10
112	November 29, 2014	Manhattan	No. 11 Kansas State	51–13
113	November 28, 2015	Lawrence	Kansas State	45–14
114	November 26, 2016	Manhattan	Kansas State	34–19
115	October 28, 2017	Lawrence	Kansas State	30–20
116	November 10, 2018	Manhattan	Kansas State	21–17
117	November 2, 2019	Lawrence	No. 22 Kansas State	38–10
118	October 24, 2020	Manhattan	No. 20 Kansas State	55–14
119	November 6, 2021	Lawrence	Kansas State	35–10
120	November 26, 2022	Manhattan	No. 12 Kansas State	47–27
121	November 18, 2023	Lawrence	No. 21 Kansas State	31–27
122	October 26, 2024	Manhattan	No. 16 Kansas State	29–27
123	October 25, 2025	Lawrence	Kansas State	42–17
124	October 17, 2026	Manhattan	Kansas State	35–24
Series: Kansas leads 65–54–5
† K-State claims victory due to the Big Eight's determination that Kansas used an ineligible player in the game

== Men's basketball ==
Kansas–Kansas State men's basketball rivalry
- Teams: Kansas Jayhawks; Kansas State Wildcats
- First meeting: January 25, 1907; Kansas 54, Kansas State 39
- Latest meeting: January 24, 2026; Kansas 86, Kansas State 62
- Next meeting: March 7, 2026

Statistics
- Total meetings: 304
- All-time series: Kansas leads, 204–97 (3 vacated)
- Longest win streak: Kansas, 31 (1994–2005)
- Current win streak: Kansas, 2 (2026–present)

The two schools have had a strong rivalry in basketball for several decades, peaking in the 1950s. Recently, the University of Kansas has been dominant in the series, including a winning streak of 31 games over K-State that lasted from 1994 to 2005. Despite the lopsided record, the rivalry has become more relevant again in recent years, with both teams ranked in the AP Top 25 for many of the match-ups.

Jeff Sagarin's rankings of the nation's top programs by decade in the ESPN College Basketball Encyclopedia nicely track the history of the rivalry. In the 1950s, when the rivalry was at its peak, Kansas State finished the decade ranked as the #3 program in the nation and KU was ranked as #4. In the 1960s KU was ranked #9 for the decade and KSU was ranked #11. In the 1970s, the programs were again nearly even, with Kansas State ranked at #24 and KU at #25. In the 1980s some separation appeared, as KU finished the decade ranked at #19 and Kansas State at #31. The big difference appeared in the 1990s and 2000s when KU was ranked at #4 and #2 for the decades, while Kansas State does not appear anywhere in the top 40.

Even when the schools are at different levels, upsets are always a possibility in the rivalry, as when Kansas State upset a KU team that was ranked #1 in the AP Poll on January 17, 1994, or when KU pulled the upset on a K-State team ranked #1 on January 17, 1953. Most recently, K-State beat a #1 KU team on February 14, 2011 in Manhattan. Over the decades, the rivalry has seen a number of notable coaches match wits, including Jack Gardner, Tex Winter, Lon Kruger and Jack Hartman at Kansas State, and James Naismith, Phog Allen, Larry Brown, Roy Williams and Bill Self at KU.

=== Early years ===
The teams were fairly even up until the 1930s, with the series standings at 31–27 in favor of Kansas entering the decade. During the 1930s and 40s, Kansas gained a large lead in the standings with a number of win streaks, including 22 in a row from 1938 to 1947. In 1935 Kansas tied an NCAA record by beating Kansas State five times in the same calendar year, a feat that was only accomplished one other time, when Kansas beat Nebraska five times in 1909.

=== 1950s ===
Both schools were national title contenders in the 1950s, with Kansas State starting the decade in the title game of the 1951 NCAA tournament, and KU winning the title at the 1952 NCAA tournament. One of the more notable games of the 1951–1952 season was a 90–88 overtime victory by #4 KU over #8 K-State in the 1951 Big Seven Holiday Tournament. KU returned to the national title game in the 1953 NCAA tournament missing back to back titles by 1 point, claiming the league title along the way over a KSU team that had earlier been the top-ranked basketball team in the country.

The rivalry heated up further with the arrival of Bob Boozer at Kansas State and Wilt Chamberlain at KU in the middle of the decade. In the 1955–1956 season, Kansas State split the season series with KU and won the Big Seven Conference title. The following year, Chamberlain led KU to the league title and a triple-overtime loss to North Carolina in the title game of the 1957 NCAA tournament. Kansas and Kansas State played another classic the following season, when Boozer scored 32 points in a 79–75 double-overtime victory at KU on February 3, 1958, while KSU was ranked #4 and KU was ranked #2. (When the two teams had previously met that season on December 30, 1957, they were ranked #2 and #3 in the country.) Following that season, KSU made another appearance in the Final Four. To close the decade, Kansas State swept the season series from KU on the way to a 25–2 record and a #1 ranking in the final AP Poll for 1959.

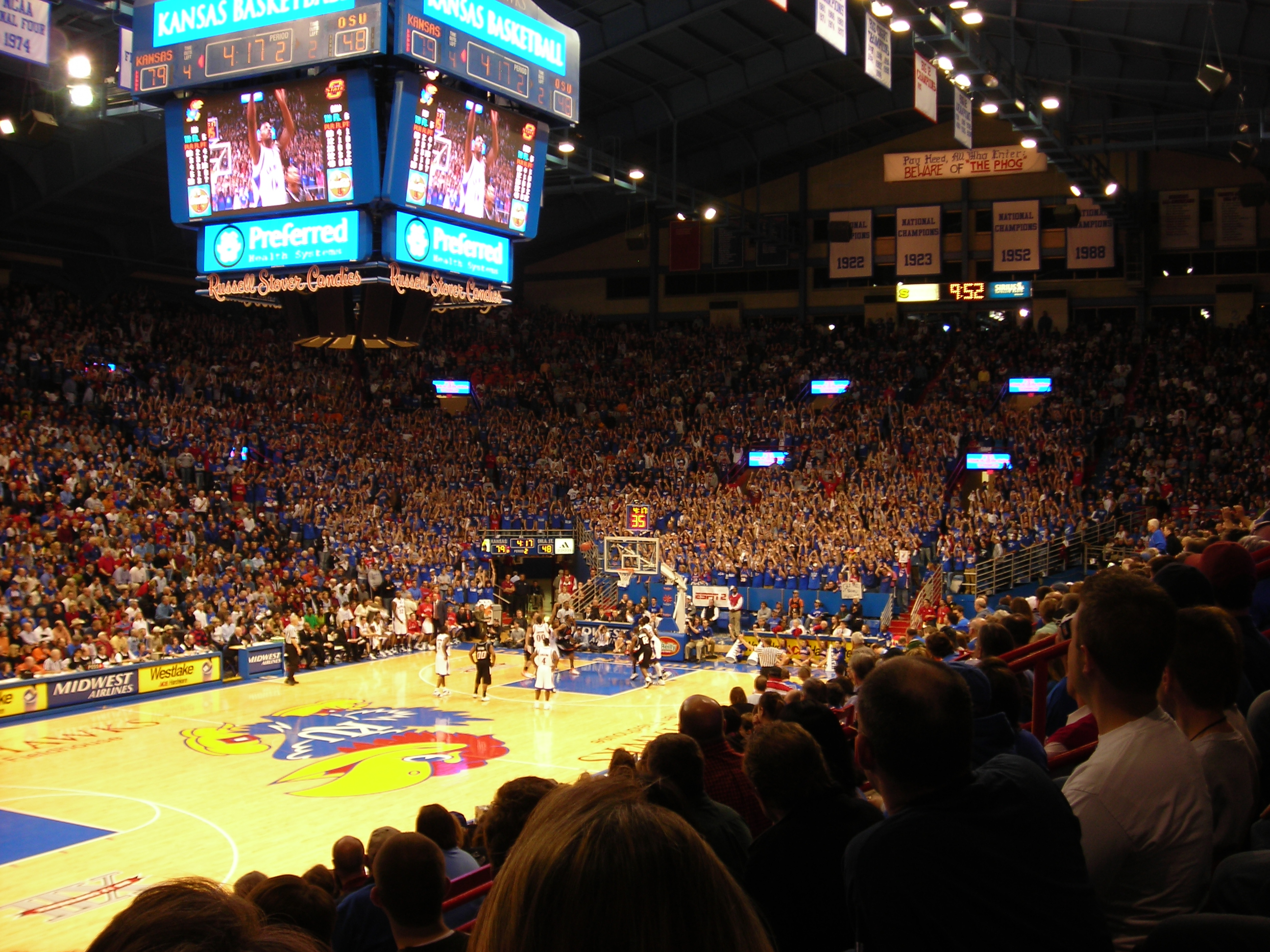
Allen Fieldhouse, home of the Jayhawks since 1955

During the 1950s, the two schools also engaged in one-upsmanship in facilities. In prior decades, Kansas State had played their games in Nichols Hall, which doubled as a gymnasium, livestock pavilion, and pool. In the late-1940s the state Legislature approved and paid for the construction of a new and much larger basketball facility. In 1950 Kansas State opened Ahearn Field House, one of the largest basketball facilities in the country at the time, which seated 14,000 spectators. Meanwhile, KU still played their home games on a converted stage in Hoch Auditorium with a seating capacity of 5,500. In response to the construction of Ahearn, the University of Kansas successfully lobbied the Legislature to approve the construction of Allen Fieldhouse, which would seat 17,000. KU opened the facility with a 77–66 victory over Kansas State on March 1, 1955.

This period also saw the beginning of the 'Sunflower Doubleheader', with two non-conference teams visiting the state to play KU and K-State at one venue one night, then switching venues and opponents the following evening. This event was held from 1957 to 1968, and featured national powerhouses such as UCLA, Xavier, San Francisco, St. Joseph's, Cal, and Marquette.

=== 1960s and 1970s ===
The basketball rivalry between the two schools continued unabated through the 1960s and 1970s, with the two schools competing annually for the Big Eight Conference championship (see chart below). In Dick Harp's last two seasons as the KU coach, the Jayhawks plummeted to losing records of 7–18 in 1962 and 12–13 in 1963. Nevertheless, in the championship game of the Big Eight Holiday Tournament in December 1962, KU posted a surprising 90-88 quadruple-overtime victory over K-State. Also, on February 20, 1965, one of the classic pranks in the series was perpetrated when a pair of 6x12 banners saying "Go Cats, Kill Snob Hill Again" unfurled on the east and west sides of the Allen Fieldhouse scoreboard with eight minutes left in the first half. Unfortunately for the Cats, this did not come to pass, as KU beat K-State 88–66. Another popular "prank" perpetrated by Kansas State students throughout the years is throwing live chickens, painted blue and red, on the court during pre-game introductions, as a taunt at the Kansas mascot, the Jayhawk. For years the Kansas State administration has attempted to stop this practice, and following a nationally televised game on February 19, 2007, PETA complained about it in a letter to KSU President Jon Wefald.

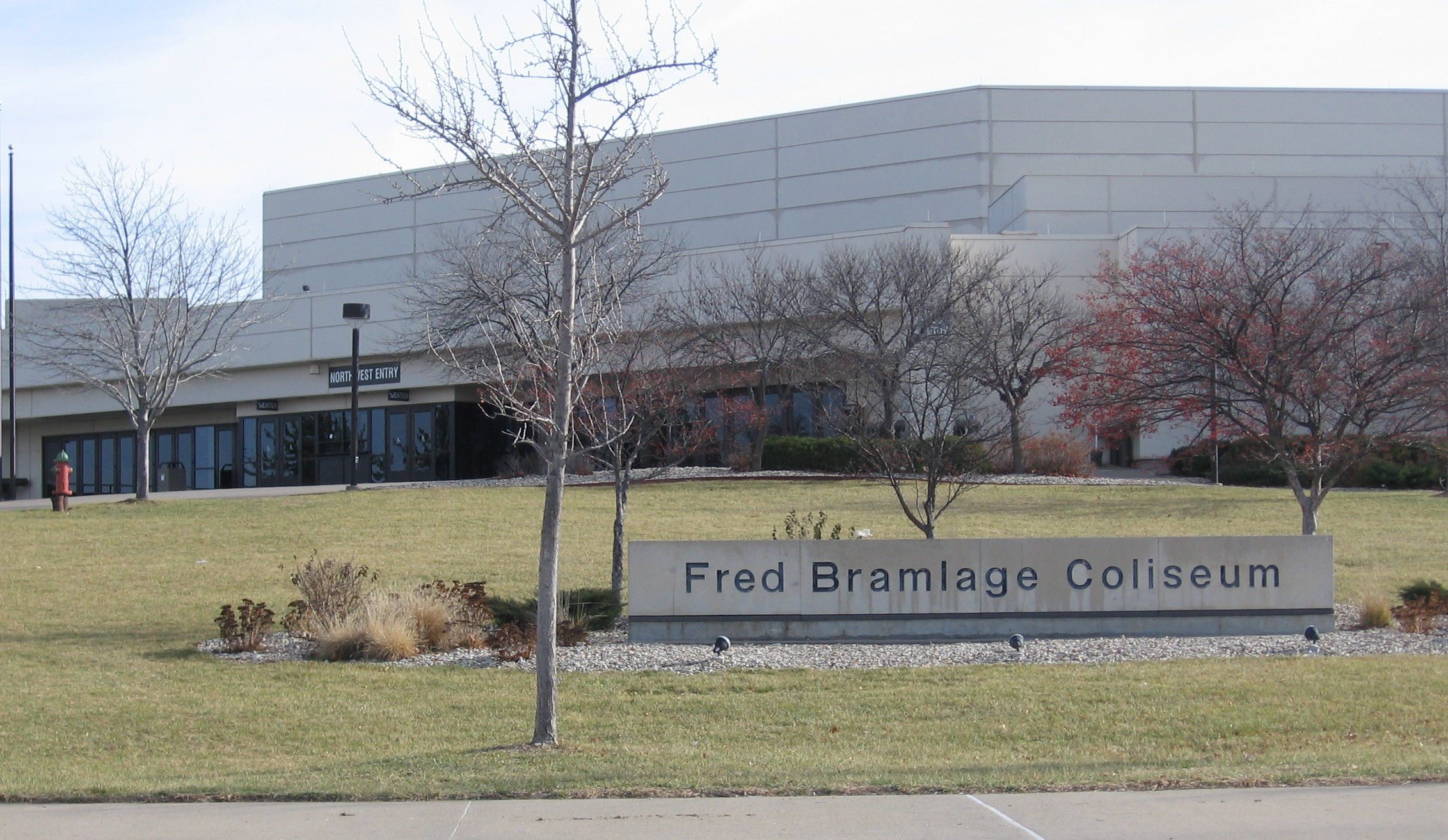
Bramlage Coliseum, home of the Wildcats since 1988

=== 1980s ===
The Wildcats swept the regular season series in 1982 and 1983, but have not done so again through the 2025–26 season.

With Richmond and Manning in their senior years, the 1987–88 season proved to be eventful in the rivalry. In the first matchup of the season, on January 30, 1988, Richmond scored 35 points to lead Kansas State to a 72–61 win to halt KU's then-record 55-game home winning streak. On February 18, KU turned the tables, prevailing 64–63 in Ahearn Field House to deny K-State a victory over KU in the old field house's last year. In what was supposed to be the rubber game, in the 1988 Big Eight Conference tournament, Kansas State won a decisive victory by a 69–54 score.

Both teams qualified for the NCAA tournament, and after three wins apiece in the tournament they faced each other on March 27 in Pontiac, Michigan, for the right to advance to the Final Four. Led by Manning's 20 points, KU turned a tight game into a runaway and prevailed 71–58. They eventually advanced to claim the school's second NCAA tournament championship. That game in the Pontiac Silverdome was the first ever meeting between the 'Hawks and the 'Cats not played in Lawrence, Manhattan, or Kansas City, Missouri.

=== The 1990s and 2000s ===
The rivalry slipped in significance after the 1988 season, as K-State slowly declined in the Big 8 and Big 12 conferences and KU saw sustained success under new coach Roy Williams. During Williams' tenure at Kansas, the Jayhawks went 50–6 against the Wildcats. Only occasionally would K-State make some noise, such as the 68–64 win over then-#1 KU in Allen Fieldhouse in 1994.

From 1994 to 2005, KU won 31 straight games against K-State, the longest streak for either school in the series. Also, from 1984 to 2007, KU won 24 straight games on the Wildcats' home floor, the third longest win-streak on an opponent's home court in NCAA history. During the latter streak, K-State won seven games against KU, but all were away from Manhattan: four games in Lawrence (1988, 1989, 1994, 2006) and three games in the Big Eight Tournament in Kansas City (1988, 1989, 1993). The streak began in Ahearn Field House, where KU won the final five meetings, and carried over into Bramlage Coliseum, where KU won the first 19 contests. KU's streak at Bramlage Coliseum came to an end on January 30, 2008, when #22-ranked Kansas State upset previously-unbeaten #2 Kansas 84–75.

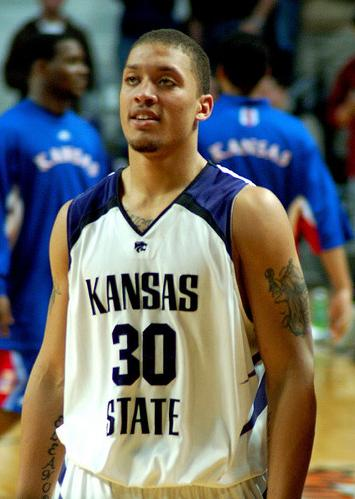
Michael Beasley, before the 2008 Sunflower Showdown

=== 2006–present ===
When Kansas State hired coach Bob Huggins to replace Jim Wooldridge in the 2006 off-season, Huggins sought to reinvigorate the rivalry. At K-State's "Madness in Manhattan" celebration to start the 2006–07 season, Huggins referred to KU's 23-game winning streak in Manhattan and said that "February 19th is when we break the streak." However, KU swept the season series from Kansas State, and Huggins departed following the season to coach his alma mater, West Virginia University.

The 2007–08 season presented a contrast between youth and experience. KU was led by the experienced coach Bill Self and retained a lineup of experienced players. Kansas State was led by a first-year head coach, Frank Martin, and featured one of the top-rated groups of freshman players in the nation. Prior to the season, Kansas State freshman phenom Michael Beasley boasted that "We're gonna beat KU at home. We're gonna beat 'em at their house. We're gonna beat 'em in Africa. Wherever we play we're gonna beat 'em." KU came into the first match-up of the season, on January 30, 2008, with a 20–0 record and a #2 national ranking, but Kansas State prevailed 84–75, ending KU's long winning streak in Manhattan. On Kansas State's trip to Lawrence later that year, though, Kansas won 88–74, leaving Beasley's prophecy unfulfilled. Both schools advanced to the NCAA tournament at the conclusion of the 2008 regular season, and Kansas went on to win its third NCAA tournament championship.

The rivalry featured three high-profile match-ups during the 2009–2010 season. In the first game on January 30, 2010, in Manhattan with ESPN's College GameDay broadcasting live from the game, Kansas came into the game ranked #2, while Kansas State was ranked #11. KU prevailed in overtime 81–79, in a game that ESPN described as a "classic." After the game, Kansas center Cole Aldrich said, "You're going to get done playing basketball, and you're going to look back and say, 'I loved playing that game.'" The Wichita Eagle wrote that the "rivalry is back." The second match-up on March 3, 2010 was the first time since 1958 that both teams were ranked in the top 5 with Kansas at #2 and KSU at #5. With number one seed implications on the line, Frank Martin called it "the biggest game we've ever played at K-State". Kansas went on to win 82–65 and secure sole possession of the Big 12 Championship. The two teams met again in the 2010 Big 12 men's basketball tournament championship game with KU ranked #1 in the nation and KSU ranked #9. The Jayhawks won 72–64, completing a three-game sweep of the Wildcats and winning the Big 12 Tournament title.

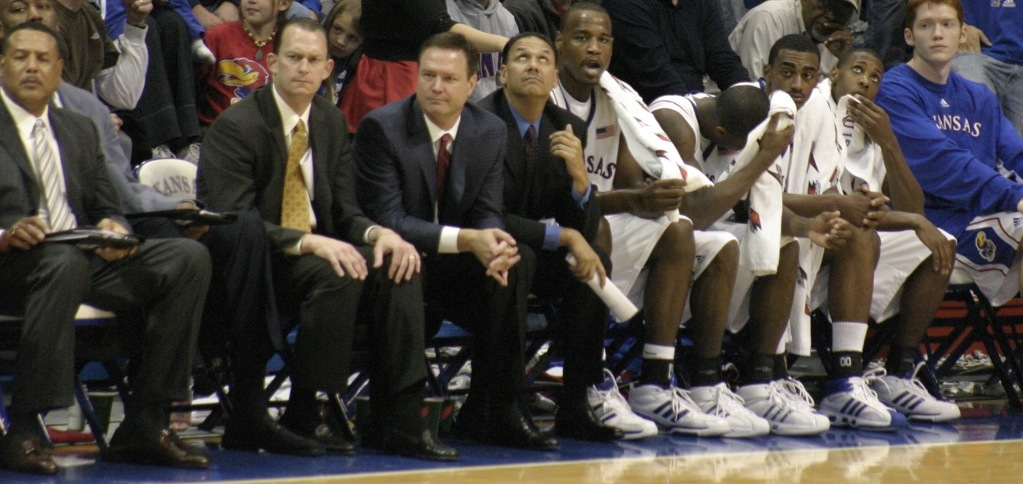
Coach Bill Self (third from left), on the KU bench

After Frank Martin left K-State in 2012 to take the coaching job with the South Carolina Gamecocks, he was replaced by Bruce Weber, former Illinois head coach. Weber led his first Kansas State team to a co-conference championship with KU in 2013. For Kansas, it was the ninth straight league title and eleventh in twelve seasons; for Kansas State, it was the first regular season conference title since winning the Big Eight in 1977. During the regular season, Kansas swept Kansas State with a 59–55 victory in Manhattan and an 83–62 victory in Lawrence. The two teams met a third time in the finals of the 2013 Big 12 Tournament, where Kansas bested Kansas State 70–54 for the three-game sweep.

The 2013–14 season saw a season split between the rivals. Kansas won 86–60 in the first meeting in Lawrence, and Kansas State won in Manhattan in overtime, 85–82, with ESPN's College GameDay again broadcasting from the game. After winning in Manhattan again in 2015, Kansas State had won four of the last eight at home since ending KU's 24-game winning streak in Manhattan in 2008. Kansas State has since dropped 6 of the last 7 at home.

One of the ugliest moments in the rivalry's history took place in January 2020 in Allen Fieldhouse, when a brawl erupted between KU and KSU players near the end of an 81–60 Jayhawk win over the Wildcats. The brawl started after KU's Silvio De Sousa had the ball stolen from him by KSU's DaJuan Gordon while attempting to dribble out the last few seconds of the game with a 21-point lead. De Sousa recovered to block a layup attempt and then stood over Gordon. In response to a perceived taunt, the Kansas State bench cleared followed quickly by Kansas' bench, and punches were thrown. The brawl went into the handicap seating area, knocking over fans. At one point De Sousa picked up a chair over his head, but dropped it seeing only KU players in front of him. The brawl resulted in a KU assistant coach suffering a broken arm, multiple school enforced player suspensions, and separate suspensions being handed down from the Big 12.

=== Conference basketball supremacy ===
From 1946 through 1978, Kansas and Kansas State made the competition for the basketball title for their conference (known as the Big Six, Big Seven and Big Eight during this time) virtually a two-way affair. During this 33-year period, KU or KSU won or shared the title 26 times. The following chart shows the conference titles captured by the Sunflower Showdown schools during this span of time. Since 1991 Kansas has won or shared the Big 8 and Big 12 titles 24 of the 30 years. Kansas and Kansas State shared the Big 12 regular-season title for the 2012–2013 season.

Team	Season	Conference
Kansas	1945–1946	Big Six Conference
Kansas State	1947–1948	Big Seven Conference
Kansas	1949–1950	Big Seven Conference
Kansas State	1949–1950	Big Seven Conference
Kansas State	1950–1951	Big Seven Conference
Kansas	1951–1952	Big Seven Conference
Kansas	1952–1953	Big Seven Conference
Kansas	1953–1954	Big Seven Conference
Kansas State	1955–1956	Big Seven Conference
Kansas	1956–1957	Big Seven Conference
Kansas State	1957–1958	Big Seven Conference
Kansas State	1958–1959	Big Eight Conference
Kansas State	1959–1960	Big Eight Conference
Kansas	1959–1960	Big Eight Conference
Kansas State	1960–1961	Big Eight Conference
Kansas State	1962–1963	Big Eight Conference
Kansas State	1963–1964	Big Eight Conference
Kansas	1965–1966	Big Eight Conference
Kansas	1966–1967	Big Eight Conference
Kansas State	1967–1968	Big Eight Conference
Kansas State	1969–1970	Big Eight Conference
Kansas	1970–1971	Big Eight Conference
Kansas State	1971–1972	Big Eight Conference
Kansas State	1972–1973	Big Eight Conference
Kansas	1973–1974	Big Eight Conference
Kansas	1974–1975	Big Eight Conference
Kansas State	1976–1977	Big Eight Conference
Kansas	1977–1978	Big Eight Conference

=== Game results ===
Kansas victories	K-State victories	Vacated

No.	Date	Location	Winner	Score
1	January 25, 1907	Lawrence	Kansas	54–39
2	February 11, 1907	Manhattan	K-State	29–25
3	January 31, 1908	Lawrence	Kansas	50–12
4	December 15, 1908	Manhattan	Kansas	42–27
5	January 27, 1910	Lawrence	Kansas	44–19
6	January 27, 1912	Lawrence	Kansas	37–24
7	February 29, 1912	Manhattan	K-State	33–28
8	January 21, 1913	Lawrence	K-State	39–21
9	January 22, 1913	Lawrence	K-State	27–25
10	January 30, 1913	Manhattan	Kansas	34–19
11	January 31, 1913	Manhattan	Kansas	30–20
12	January 22, 1914	Manhattan	Kansas	44–26
13	January 23, 1914	Manhattan	K-State	29–25
14	January 30, 1914	Lawrence	Kansas	28–24
15	January 31, 1914	Lawrence	Kansas	41–16
16	January 28, 1915	Manhattan	Kansas	38–22
17	January 29, 1915	Manhattan	Kansas	36–32
18	February 10, 1915	Lawrence	K-State	21–18
19	February 11, 1915	Lawrence	Kansas	39–20
20	January 20, 1916	Lawrence	K-State	31–18
21	January 21, 1916	Lawrence	K-State	26–12
22	February 17, 1916	Manhattan	K-State	38–23
23	February 18, 1916	Manhattan	K-State	45–21
24	January 23, 1917	Lawrence	Kansas	34–16
25	January 24, 1917	Lawrence	Kansas	27–19
26	February 2, 1917	Manhattan	K-State	38–9
27	February 3, 1917	Manhattan	K-State	32–29
28	January 30, 1918	Lawrence	K-State	36–23
29	January 31, 1918	Lawrence	Kansas	35–32
30	March 4, 1918	Manhattan	Kansas	35–33
31	March 5, 1918	Manhattan	K-State	32–25
32	February 6, 1919	Manhattan	K-State	33–30
33	February 7, 1919	Manhattan	K-State	41–27
34	February 27, 1919	Lawrence	K-State	37–22
35	February 28, 1919	Lawrence	K-State	31–18
36	February 6, 1920	Manhattan	Kansas	33–18
37	February 7, 1920	Manhattan	K-State	26–12
38	March 9, 1920	Lawrence	Kansas	30–24
39	March 10, 1920	Lawrence	Kansas	31–23
40	February 4, 1921	Lawrence	K-State	31–18
41	February 5, 1921	Lawrence	K-State	24–22
42	February 18, 1921	Manhattan	K-State	36–30
43	February 19, 1921	Manhattan	K-State	26–18
44	February 8, 1922	Manhattan	Kansas	32–23
45	February 28, 1922	Lawrence	Kansas	44–26
46	February 7, 1923	Lawrence	Kansas	44–23
47	February 21, 1923	Manhattan	Kansas	24–17
48	January 22, 1924	Manhattan	Kansas	36–21
49	February 12, 1924	Lawrence	Kansas	23–15
50	January 14, 1925	Lawrence	K-State	40–28
51	February 24, 1925	Manhattan	Kansas	27–17
52	January 13, 1926	Manhattan	Kansas	25–16
53	March 1, 1926	Lawrence	Kansas	34–29
54	February 9, 1927	Manhattan	Kansas	35–34
55	March 4, 1927	Lawrence	Kansas	29–24
56	December 16, 1927	Lawrence	K-State	20–13
57	March 7, 1928	Manhattan	K-State	40–30
58	February 2, 1929	Lawrence	Kansas	31–24
59	March 5, 1929	Manhattan	K-State	36–35
60	February 5, 1930	Manhattan	Kansas	29–26
61	February 18, 1930	Lawrence	Kansas	32–30
62	January 17, 1931	Manhattan	Kansas	37–29
63	February 17, 1931	Lawrence	Kansas	40–26
64	December 11, 1931	Lawrence	Kansas	32–30
65	December 16, 1931	Manhattan	Kansas	27–25
66	January 15, 1932	Lawrence	Kansas	27–26
67	February 12, 1932	Manhattan	Kansas	30–22
68	December 2, 1932	Lawrence	K-State	31–27
69	December 7, 1932	Manhattan	K-State	15–11
70	January 10, 1933	Lawrence	Kansas	36–24
71	February 25, 1933	Manhattan	Kansas	33–25
72	December 12, 1933	Lawrence	Kansas	27–13
73	December 15, 1933	Manhattan	Kansas	34–20
74	January 20, 1934	Lawrence	Kansas	32–24
75	February 24, 1934	Manhattan	Kansas	39–23
76	December 14, 1934	Lawrence	K-State	39–35 *
77	December 18, 1934	Manhattan	Kansas	40–26
78	January 11, 1935	Lawrence	Kansas	40–14
79	January 26, 1935	Lawrence	Kansas	43–37
80	February 22, 1935	Manhattan	Kansas	39–33
81	February 23, 1935	Manhattan	Kansas	36–30
82	December 21, 1935	Kansas City, MO	Kansas	38–23 ‡
83	January 7, 1936	Manhattan	Kansas	28–17
84	February 15, 1936	Lawrence	Kansas	52–34
85	January 19, 1937	Lawrence	Kansas	39–28
86	February 11, 1937	Manhattan	K-State	33–32 *
87	January 11, 1938	Manhattan	Kansas	33–21
88	February 7, 1938	Lawrence	Kansas	35–33
89	January 10, 1939	Lawrence	Kansas	33–29
90	January 28, 1939	Manhattan	Kansas	40–38
91	January 12, 1940	Lawrence	Kansas	34–33
92	February 20, 1940	Manhattan	Kansas	44–33
93	January 20, 1941	Manhattan	Kansas	46–41
94	February 25, 1941	Lawrence	Kansas	50–45 *
95	January 24, 1942	Lawrence	Kansas	46–44 *
96	March 3, 1942	Manhattan	Kansas	45–26
97	January 20, 1943	Manhattan	Kansas	40–20
98	March 6, 1943	Lawrence	Kansas	47–30
99	December 29, 1943	Kansas City, MO	Kansas	62–44 ‡
100	January 18, 1944	Lawrence	Kansas	36–30
101	February 23, 1944	Manhattan	Kansas	32–24
102	December 22, 1944	Kansas City, MO	Kansas	63–40 ‡
103	January 30, 1945	Lawrence	Kansas	39–36
104	February 16, 1945	Manhattan	Kansas	33–31
105	December 14, 1945	Kansas City, MO	Kansas	71–46 ‡
106	January 9, 1946	Manhattan	Kansas	39–26
107	January 29, 1946	Lawrence	Kansas	68–43
108	January 28, 1947	Lawrence	Kansas	50–39
109	February 20, 1947	Manhattan	K-State	48–45
110	December 19, 1947	Kansas City, MO	K-State	56–42 ‡
111	February 18, 1948	Manhattan	K-State	48–29
112	March 1, 1948	Lawrence	K-State	61–60
113	December 29, 1948	Kansas City, MO	Kansas	60–46
114	February 9, 1949	Lawrence	K-State	53–48
115	February 24, 1949	Manhattan	K-State	63–36
116	December 27, 1949	Kansas City, MO	K-State	58–48 ‡
117	February 14, 1950	Manhattan	K-State	55–50
118	March 7, 1950	Lawrence	Kansas	79–68
119	January 15, 1951	Lawrence	K-State	47–43
120	February 24, 1951	Manhattan	K-State	65–51
121	December 28, 1951	Kansas City, MO	Kansas	90–88 *‡
122	January 26, 1952	Manhattan	K-State	81–64
123	March 7, 1952	Lawrence	Kansas	78–61
124	December 30, 1952	Kansas City, MO	K-State	93–87 ‡
125	January 17, 1953	Lawrence	Kansas	80–66
126	February 17, 1953	Manhattan	Kansas	80–78
127	January 16, 1954	Manhattan	Kansas	65–62
128	February 17, 1954	Lawrence	Kansas	85–74
129	February 12, 1955	Manhattan	Kansas	78–68
130	March 1, 1955	Lawrence	Kansas	77–67
131	January 14, 1956	Manhattan	Kansas	91–86
132	March 6, 1956	Lawrence	K-State	79–68
133	January 12, 1957	Lawrence	Kansas	51–45
134	March 6, 1957	Manhattan	Kansas	64–57
135	December 30, 1957	Kansas City, MO	Kansas	79–65 ‡
136	February 3, 1958	Lawrence	K-State	79–75 **
137	March 8, 1958	Manhattan	Kansas	61–44
138	February 11, 1959	Manhattan	K-State	82–72
139	February 27, 1959	Lawrence	K-State	87–77
140	February 10, 1960	Lawrence	Kansas	64–62
141	February 24, 1960	Manhattan	K-State	68–57
142	March 9, 1960	Manhattan	Kansas	84–82 *#
143	December 29, 1960	Kansas City, MO	K-State	69–66 *‡
144	January 20, 1961	Lawrence	Kansas	75–66
145	February 11, 1961	Manhattan	K-State	81–63
146	January 10, 1962	Manhattan	K-State	70–45
147	February 7, 1962	Lawrence	K-State	91–72
148	December 29, 1962	Kansas City, MO	Kansas	90–88 ****‡
149	February 19, 1963	Lawrence	K-State	67–54
150	February 27, 1963	Manhattan	K-State	74–60
151	February 1, 1964	Lawrence	K-State	58–55
152	February 22, 1964	Manhattan	K-State	70–46
153	December 29, 1964	Kansas City, MO	Kansas	54–52 ‡
154	January 20, 1965	Manhattan	K-State	71–63

No.	Date	Location	Winner	Score
155	February 20, 1965	Lawrence	Kansas	86–66
156	December 28, 1965	Kansas City, MO	Kansas	69–63 ‡
157	January 22, 1966	Lawrence	Kansas	69–61
158	March 5, 1966	Manhattan	Kansas	68–55
159	February 11, 1967	Manhattan	Kansas	60–55
160	March 11, 1967	Lawrence	Kansas	74–56
161	January 20, 1968	Manhattan	K-State	71–56
162	February 24, 1968	Lawrence	K-State	64–61 *
163	January 18, 1969	Manhattan	Kansas	73–67
164	March 8, 1969	Lawrence	K-State	64–57
165	February 14, 1970	Manhattan	K-State	71–68
166	March 7, 1970	Lawrence	Kansas	82–79
167	February 1, 1971	Lawrence	Kansas	79–74
168	February 23, 1971	Manhattan	Kansas	61–48
169	January 17, 1972	Lawrence	Kansas	66–63 **
170	February 15, 1972	Manhattan	K-State	78–66
171	December 28, 1972	Kansas City, MO	K-State	91–70 ‡
172	January 23, 1973	Lawrence	K-State	77–68
173	February 13, 1973	Manhattan	K-State	67–66
174	February 13, 1974	Manhattan	K-State	74–71
175	March 6, 1974	Lawrence	Kansas	60–55
176	February 1, 1975	Manhattan	K-State	66–56
177	February 22, 1975	Lawrence	Kansas	91–53
178	January 31, 1976	Lawrence	Kansas	62–57
179	February 21, 1976	Manhattan	K-State	69–54
180	December 29, 1976	Kansas City, MO	Kansas	81–64 ‡
181	January 22, 1977	Manhattan	K-State	80–65
182	February 12, 1977	Lawrence	K-State	86–83
183	March 3, 1977	Kansas City, MO	K-State	80–67 +
184	December 30, 1977	Kansas City, MO	Kansas	67–62 ‡
185	January 21, 1978	Lawrence	Kansas	56–52
186	February 11, 1978	Manhattan	Kansas	75–63
187	March 3, 1978	Kansas City, MO	K-State	87–76 +
188	January 20, 1979	Manhattan	K-State	96–69
189	February 17, 1979	Lawrence	K-State	58–56
190	January 19, 1980	Lawrence	K-State	61–52
191	February 16, 1980	Manhattan	Kansas	48–46
192	March 1, 1980	Kansas City, MO	K-State	79–58 +
193	January 28, 1981	Manhattan	K-State	54–43
194	February 18, 1981	Lawrence	Kansas	58–50
195	March 7, 1981	Kansas City, MO	Kansas	80–68 +
196	January 23, 1982	Manhattan	K-State	70–53
197	February 20, 1982	Lawrence	K-State	63–53
198	March 2, 1982	Manhattan	K-State	74–62 +
199	January 29, 1983	Manhattan	K-State	58–57
200	February 26, 1983	Lawrence	K-State	70–63
201	January 28, 1984	Lawrence	Kansas	65–54
202	February 25, 1984	Manhattan	Kansas	63–61
203	March 9, 1984	Kansas City, MO	Kansas	70–59 +
204	January 30, 1985	Manhattan	Kansas	75–57
205	February 20, 1985	Lawrence	Kansas	75–64
206	February 1, 1986	Manhattan	Kansas	64–50
207	February 22, 1986	Lawrence	Kansas	84–69
208	March 7, 1986	Kansas City, MO	Kansas	74–51 +
209	February 4, 1987	Manhattan	Kansas	80–75 **
210	February 19, 1987	Lawrence	Kansas	84–67
211	January 30, 1988	Lawrence	K-State	72–61
212	February 18, 1988	Manhattan	Kansas	64–63
213	March 12, 1988	Kansas City, MO	K-State	69–54 +
214	March 27, 1988	Pontiac, Mich.	Kansas	71–58 †
215	January 14, 1989	Manhattan	Kansas	75–74 *
216	January 28, 1989	Lawrence	K-State	71–70
217	March 10, 1989	Kansas City, MO	K-State	73–65
218	January 27, 1990	Manhattan	Kansas	85–57
219	February 24, 1990	Lawrence	Kansas	70–58
220	January 29, 1991	Manhattan	Kansas	78–69
221	February 16, 1991	Lawrence	Kansas	69–67
222	February 3, 1992	Lawrence	Kansas	80–58
223	February 22, 1992	Manhattan	Kansas	54–52
224	January 18, 1993	Manhattan	Kansas	71–65
225	February 20, 1993	Lawrence,	Kansas	77–64
226	March 13, 1993	Kansas City, MO	K-State	74–67 +
227	January 17, 1994	Lawrence	K-State	68–64
228	February 12, 1994	Manhattan	Kansas	65–56
229	March 11, 1994	Kansas City, MO	Kansas	73–52 +
230	January 18, 1995	Lawrence	Kansas	78–74
231	February 18, 1995	Manhattan	Kansas	78–67
232	March 10, 1995	Kansas City, MO	Kansas	90–45 +
233	February 4, 1996	Lawrence	Kansas	72–62
234	February 24, 1996	Manhattan	Kansas	77–66
235	March 9, 1996	Kansas City, MO	Kansas	61–55 +
236	January 4, 1997	Manhattan	Kansas	62–59
237	February 22, 1997	Lawrence	Kansas	78–58
238	January 17, 1998	Lawrence	Kansas	69–62
239	February 14, 1998	Manhattan	Kansas	73–58
240	March 6, 1998	Kansas City, MO	Kansas	68–61 ^
241	February 1, 1999	Manhattan	Kansas	69–46
242	February 17, 1999	Lawrence	Kansas	62–47
243	March 6, 1999	Kansas City, MO	Kansas	69–58 ^
244	January 12, 2000	Lawrence	Kansas	87–79
245	February 12, 2000	Manhattan	Kansas	94–65
246	March 9, 2000	Kansas City, MO	Kansas	84–60 ^
247	January 27, 2001	Lawrence	Kansas	92–66
248	February 28, 2001	Manhattan	Kansas	77–65
249	March 9, 2001	Kansas City, MO	Kansas	94–63 ^
250	February 4, 2002	Manhattan	Kansas	98–71
251	February 27, 2002	Lawrence	Kansas	103–68
252	January 18, 2003	Lawrence	Kansas	81–64
253	February 8, 2003	Manhattan	Kansas	82–64
254	January 14, 2004	Lawrence	Kansas	73–67
255	January 28, 2004	Manhattan	Kansas	78–70
256	February 9, 2005	Manhattan	Kansas	74–65
257	March 2, 2005	Lawrence	Kansas	72–65
258	March 11, 2005	Kansas City, MO	Kansas	80–67 ^
259	January 14, 2006	Lawrence	K-State	59–55
260	March 4, 2006	Manhattan	Kansas	66–52
261	February 7, 2007	Lawrence	Kansas	97–70
262	February 19, 2007	Manhattan	Kansas	71–62
263	March 10, 2007	Oklahoma City, OK	Kansas	67–61 ^
264	January 30, 2008	Manhattan	K-State	84–75
265	March 1, 2008	Lawrence	Kansas	88–74
266	January 13, 2009	Lawrence	Kansas	87–71
267	February 14, 2009	Manhattan	Kansas	85–74
268	January 30, 2010	Manhattan	Kansas	81–79*
269	March 3, 2010	Lawrence	Kansas	82–65
270	March 13, 2010	Kansas City, MO	Kansas	72–64 ^
271	January 29, 2011	Lawrence	Kansas	90–66
272	February 14, 2011	Manhattan	K-State	84–68
273	January 4, 2012	Lawrence	Kansas	67–49
274	February 13, 2012	Manhattan	Kansas	59–53
275	January 22, 2013	Manhattan	Kansas	59–55
276	February 11, 2013	Lawrence	Kansas	83–62
277	March 16, 2013	Kansas City, Mo.	Kansas	70–54^
278	January 11, 2014	Lawrence	Kansas	86–60
279	February 10, 2014	Manhattan	K-State	85–82*
280	January 31, 2015	Lawrence	Kansas	68–57
281	February 23, 2015	Manhattan	K-State	70–63
282	February 3, 2016	Lawrence	Kansas	77–59
283	February 22, 2016	Manhattan	Kansas	72–63
284	March 10, 2016	Kansas City, MO	Kansas	85–63^
285	January 3, 2017	Lawrence	Kansas	90–88
286	February 6, 2017	Manhattan	Kansas	74–71
287	January 13, 2018	Lawrence	None	73–72
288	January 29, 2018	Manhattan	None	70–56
289	March 9, 2018	Kansas City, MO	None	83–67^
290	February 5, 2019	Manhattan	K-State	74–67
291	February 25, 2019	Lawrence	Kansas	64–49
292	January 21, 2020	Lawrence	Kansas	81–60
293	February 29, 2020	Manhattan	Kansas	62–58
294	February 2, 2021	Lawrence	Kansas	74–51
295	February 17, 2021	Manhattan	Kansas	59–41
296	January 22, 2022	Manhattan	Kansas	78–75
297	February 22, 2022	Lawrence	Kansas	102–83
298	January 17, 2023	Manhattan	K-State	83–82*
299	January 31, 2023	Lawrence	Kansas	90–78
300	February 5, 2024	Manhattan	K-State	75–70*
301	March 5, 2024	Lawrence	Kansas	90–68
302	January 18, 2025	Lawrence	Kansas	84–74
303	February 8, 2025	Manhattan	K-State	81–73
304	January 24, 2026	Manhattan	Kansas	86–62
305	March 7, 2026	Lawrence	Kansas	104–85
Series: Kansas leads 205–97

Key

- * Overtime
- # Playoff for NCAA berth
- † NCAA Tournament
- ‡ Big 6/7/8 Holiday Tournament
- + Big Eight Postseason Tournament
- ^ Big 12 Postseason Tournament

== Baseball ==
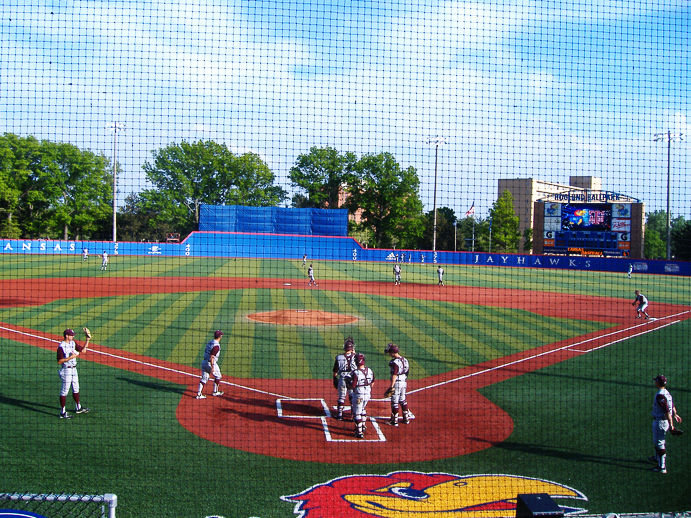
Hoglund Ballpark at The University of Kansas

The schools first met on the baseball field in 1898. The all-time series record is disputed between the two schools, with the KU media guide listing the Jayhawks ahead 198-187-1, while the KSU media guide list the series with KSU ahead 189-182-1 (as of April 22, 2025). The discrepancy is likely the result of highly inaccurate records by both schools for the early years of the series, with games missing from both record books. For example, in the 1912 season the KU media guide states that the teams met four times with KU winning three of four. On the other hand, the KSU media guide lists only one matchup, with KSU the victor. A four-game series was the standard at the time, as both record books reflect a four-game series in 1911 and 1913. Another example is in the 1914 season where the KU record books reflect four matchups with each team winning two, while the KSU books show only two matchups and KSU the winner of both. In the 1916 season the KSU record books show a four-game series with KU winning all four, while KU books do not reflect having played KSU at all. These sorts of discrepancies are frequent until the late 20s when both schools books begin to coincide.

Tointon Family Stadium at Kansas State University

== Overall all-sports series standings ==
The schools compete annually in football, men's basketball, women's basketball, women's volleyball, baseball, cross country, track and field, women's tennis, rowing, men's golf, and women's golf. Kansas State does not currently sponsor fast-pitch softball and neither sponsor men's tennis. Below are the series records in the major sports that both schools currently compete in. Kansas leads the active series in all sports combined 635–509–9 according to KU or 620–514–9 according to K-State.

Sport	Series record	Last Result
Football	KU leads 64–54–5^{†} or 65–53–5^{‡}	42–17 KSU win on October 25, 2025
Men's Basketball	KU leads 205–97 §	104–85 KU win on March 7, 2026
Women's Basketball	KSU leads 81–53	75–68 KU win on February 21, 2026
Baseball	KU leads 198–187–1^{‡} or KSU leads 189–182–1^{†}	6–5 KU win on April 19, 2025
Women's Volleyball	KSU leads 66–62–1	3–1 KU win on November 24, 2024
Women's Soccer	KU leads 7–2–2	4–1 KU win on October 2, 2025
Women's Tennis	KU leads 46–15	4–0 KU win on April 13, 2025
Women's Rowing	KSU leads 21–17*	17–5 KU win on May 3, 2025

† - As recorded in the K-State record books.
‡ - As recorded in the KU record books.
* From 1997 to 2012 there were two meets per year, a Fall Sunflower Showdown (KSU 7–5) and a Spring Kansas Cup (KSU 8–5). Starting in 2012 there has been a Spring Sunflower Showdown (TIED 5–5) that awards the Kansas Cup trophy.
§ - KU was forced to vacate three victories over KSU from the 2017–18 season due to using an ineligible player; had those victories remained intact, KU would lead the series 208–97.

== See also ==
- List of NCAA college football rivalry games
- List of most-played college football series in NCAA Division I
