= 1897 Minor Counties Championship =

- Cricket format: 2 days
- Tournament format(s): League system
- Champions: Worcestershire (2nd title)
- Participants: 16
- Matches: 54
- Most runs: Arthur Croome (431 for Berkshire)
- Most wickets: George Nash (62 for Buckinghamshire)

The 1897 Minor Counties Championship was the third running of the Minor Counties Cricket Championship, and ran from 7 June to 28 August 1897. Having been unbeaten for the entire season, Worcestershire won their second consecutive outright title, having also shared the title in 1895. Staffordshire were level in the table with Worcestershire, but played an insufficient number of matches to be considered co-champions. Sixteen teams competed in the championship, with Cornwall, Dorset and Monmouthshire all competing for the first time, though none of them played the minimum of eight matches.

The leading run-scorer, Arthur Croome of Berkshire, also had the highest individual score of the season, 158 against Hertfordshire. The leading wicket-taker for the second consecutive season, Buckinghamshire's George Nash, took three ten wicket match hauls, including 16/74 against Oxfordshire.

== Table ==
- One point was awarded for a win, and one point was taken away for each loss. Final placings were decided by dividing the number of points earned by the number of completed matches (i.e. those that ended in a win or a loss), and multiplying by 100.

Team	Pld	W	L	D	Pts	Fin	%Fin
Worcestershire	10	7	0	3	7	7	100.00
Staffordshire ‡	2	1	0	1	1	1	100.00
Glamorgan	8	4	1	3	3	5	60.00
Durham	8	3	1	4	2	4	50.00
Buckinghamshire	8	5	2	1	3	7	42.86
Wiltshire	10	5	2	3	3	7	42.86
Norfolk	8	4	2	2	2	6	33.33
Northumberland	8	2	2	4	0	4	0.00
Berkshire	10	3	4	3	—1	7	—14.29
Northamptonshire	8	1	2	5	—1	3	—33.33
Hertfordshire	8	1	5	2	—4	6	—66.67
Oxfordshire ‡	6	1	5	0	—4	6	—66.67
Cambridgeshire ‡	6	0	5	1	—5	5	—100.00
Cornwall ‡	2	0	2	0	—2	2	—100.00
Dorset ‡	2	0	1	1	—1	1	—100.00
Monmouthshire ‡	4	0	3	1	—3	3	—100.00
Source: CricketArchive

Notes

- denotes the Champion team(s).
- ‡ denotes a team that failed to play the minimum of eight matches. These teams are sometimes omitted from the table altogether.

== Averages ==
Most runs
Aggregate	Average	Player	County
431	25.35	Arthur Croome	Berkshire
430	35.83	Richard Lowe	Glamorgan
415	37.72	George Simpson	Northumberland
411	34.25	Ted Arnold	Worcestershire
396	24.75	Leopold Collins	Berkshire

Most wickets
Aggregate	Average	Player	County
62	14.62	George Nash	Buckinghamshire
61	10.57	Ted Arnold	Worcestershire
57	11.73	George Thompson	Northamptonshire
55	11.18	Mat Wright	Buckinghamshire
54	10.75	Albert Bird	Worcestershire
