= 1898 Melbourne Cup =

Annual horse race in Victoria, Australia

- Melbourne Cup
- Location: Flemington Racecourse
- Date: 1 November 1898
- Distance: 2 miles
- Winning horse: The Grafter
- Winning time: 3:29.75
- Final odds: 8/1
- Jockey: J Gough
- Trainer: William Forrester
- Owner: William Forrester
- Surface: Turf
- Attendance: 70,000

The 1898 Melbourne Cup was a two-mile handicap horse race which took place on Tuesday, 1 November 1898.

This year was the thirty-eighth running of the Melbourne Cup.

This is the list of placegetters for the 1898 Melbourne Cup.

Place	Name	Jockey	Trainer	Owner
1	The Grafter	J Gough	William Forrester	William Forrester
2	Wait-A-Bit	F. Fielder	A Taylor	
3	Cocos	W. Delaney	Tom Payten	

== See also ==
- Melbourne Cup
- List of Melbourne Cup winners
- Victoria Racing Club
