= 1897 Melbourne Cup =

Annual horse race in Victoria, Australia

- Melbourne Cup
- Location: Flemington Racecourse
- Date: 2 November 1897
- Distance: 2 miles
- Winning horse: Gaulus
- Winning time: 3:31.0
- Final odds: 14/1
- Jockey: S Callinan
- Trainer: William Forrester
- Owner: William Forrester
- Surface: Turf
- Attendance: 85,000

The 1897 Melbourne Cup was a two-mile handicap horse race which took place on Tuesday, 2 November 1897.

This year was the thirty-seventh running of the Melbourne Cup.

This is the list of placegetters for the 1897 Melbourne Cup.

Place	Name	Jockey	Trainer	Owner
1	Gaulus	S Callinan	William Forrester	William Forrester
2	The Grafter	W. Redfearn	William Forrester	William Forrester
3	Aurum	H. J. Morrison	H Munro	

== See also ==
- Melbourne Cup
- List of Melbourne Cup winners
- Victoria Racing Club
