= Richard Nicholls =

English cricketer

Richard William Nicholls (23 July 1875, in Crouch End, Middlesex – 22 January 1948, in Eastbourne, Sussex) was an English cricketer who played first-class cricket from 1896 to 1904.

Nicholls was a right-handed batsman who represented Middlesex. He also played first-class cricket for Marylebone Cricket Club (MCC), AJ Webbe's XI, PF Warner's XI and the Gentlemen of England. He scored 1,732 runs (average 16.81) in 72 first-class matches. He and Mickey Roche set a county record tenth-wicket stand of 230 against Kent at Lord's in 1899, during which he made his maiden century, scoring 154.
