= 1897 Currie Cup =

Domestic rugby union competition

- Countries: South Africa
- Champions: Western Province (4th title)

The 1897 Currie Cup was the fourth edition of the Currie Cup, the premier domestic rugby union competition in South Africa.

The tournament was won by Western Province for the fourth time, who won all four of their matches in the competition.

== See also ==
- Currie Cup
