= Francky Wardan =

British tennis player

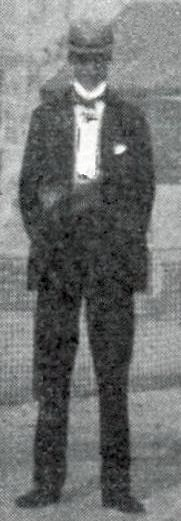
- Residence: France

Singles
- Career titles: French Championships (1897)
- Highest ranking: Runner-up

Doubles
- Career titles: French Championships (1896)
- Highest ranking: Champion

Francky Wardan was a British tennis player residing in France. Warden won the doubles title at the Amateur French Championships in 1896 with Wynes as his partner. Wardan finished runner-up to Paul Aymé in the singles event of the national French Championships in 1897, losing out 4–6, 6–4, 6–2.

== Grand Slam finals ==
=== Singles: 1 (0-1) ===
Result	Year	Championship	Surface	Opponent	Score
Loss	1897	French Championships	Clay	(France) Paul Aymé	4–6, 6–4, 6–2
