= 1897 Grand National =

English steeplechase horse race

- Grand National
- Location: Aintree
- Date: 26 March 1897
- Winning horse: Manifesto
- Starting price: 6/1 F
- Jockey: Terry Kavanagh
- Trainer: Willie McAuliffe
- Owner: Harry Dyas
- Conditions: Good

The 1897 Grand National was the 59th renewal of the Grand National horse race that took place at Aintree near Liverpool, England, on 26 March 1897.

== Finishing Order ==
Position	Name	Jockey	Age	Handicap (st-lb)	SP	Distance
01	Manifesto	Terry Kavanagh	9	11-3	6/1	20 lengths
02	Filbert	Mr Charles Beatty	?	9-7	100/1	
03	Ford of Fyne	Fred Withington	6	10-7	25/1	
04	Prince Albert	Mr Gwyn Davies	?	10-8	25/1	
05	Lotus Lily	Mr Arthur Wood	?	9-7	100/1	
06	Timon	Tervit	?	9-10	20/1	
07	Fairy Queen	Mr E H Lord	?	9-7	50/1	
08	Seaport II	C James	?	10-7	50/1	
09	Nelly Gray	George Morris	?	11-3	20/1	
10	Argonaut	Richard Woodland	7	10-12	33/1	Last to complete

== Non-finishers ==
Fence	Name	Jockey	Age	Handicap (st-lb)	SP	Fate
23	Westmeath	William Taylor	?	11-4	100/1	
17	Clawson	Billy Bissill	?	10-10	33/1	
23	Norton	James Hickey	?	10-7	10/1	
18	Daimio	Henry Escott	?	12-6	40/1	Pulled Up
	Cathal	Reginald Ward	?	11-10	7/1	
17	Wild Man From Borneo	Joe Widger	?	11-5	9/1	
25	The Soarer	Mr David Campbell	?	11-4	100/6	
08	Ballyohara	Denby	?	10-3	100/1	
	Golden Cross	G Wilson	?	10-2	33/1	
21	Barcalwhey	Charles Hogan	?	10-1	25/1	
	Red Cross	Harry Taylor	?	10-1	100/1	
23	The Continental	Henry Brown	?	10-0	100/1	
19	Chevy Chase	Algy Anthony	?	9-13	28/1	
	Greenhill	E Matthews	?	9-10	25/1	
	Mediator	Grosvenor	?	9-8	100/1	
21	Little Joe	Bland	?	9-8	100/1	
15	Goldfish	Thomas Fitton	?	9-7	66/1	
23	Gauntlet	Cpt Wentworth Johnstone	?	11-13	66/1	
