= Arthur Carracher =

Australian cricketer (1867–1935)

Personal information
- Born: 9 July 1867; Heywood, Victoria, Australia
- Died: 15 October 1935 (aged 68); Adelaide, Australia
- Source: Cricinfo, 21 May 2018

Arthur James Carracher (9 July 1867 – 15 October 1935) was an Australian cricketer. He played two first-class matches for South Australia in 1896/97. He was also a member of the Narracoorte District Council.

== See also ==
- List of South Australian representative cricketers
