= 1898 Grand National =

English steeplechase horse race

- Grand National
- Location: Aintree
- Date: 25 March 1898
- Winning horse: (Republic of Ireland) Drogheda
- Starting price: 25/1
- Jockey: John Gourley
- Trainer: Richard Dawson
- Owner: C G M Adams
- Conditions: Good

The 1898 Grand National was the 60th renewal of the Grand National horse race that took place at Aintree near Liverpool, England, on 25 March 1898.

== Finishing Order ==
Position	Name	Jockey	Age	Handicap (st-lb)	SP	Distance
01	Drogheda	John Gourley	6	10-12	25/1	3 Lengths
02	Cathal	Mr Reginald Ward	?	11-5	7/1	
03	Gauntlet	William Taylor	?	10-13	100/12	
04	Filbert	Mr Charles Beatty	?	9-12	25/1	
05	Dead Level	Algy Anthony	?	10-7	25/1	
06	Ford of Fyne	Mr Fred Withington	?	11-0	11/2	
07	Grudon	James Hickey	?	11-5	25/1	
08	Barsac	Mr MB Bletsoe	?	9-12	25/1	
09	Prince Albert	Mr Gwyn Davies	?	11-0	8/1	
10	Green Hill	Charles Hogan	?	10-3	100/1	Last to complete

== Non-finishers ==
Fence	Name	Jockey	Age	Handicap (st-lb)	SP	Fate
16	The Soarer	Arthur Nightingall	?	11-5	100/7	Fell
25	Nepcote	Bill Dollery	?	10-9	25/1	Pulled Up
24	Swanshot	Mr H de Montmorency	?	10-7	100/1	Pulled Up
14	Barcalwhey	R Chalmer	?	10-6	100/7	Fell
17	Athelfrith	William Hoysted	?	10-4	100/1	Pulled Up
01	Surplice	Lathom	?	10-1	100/1	Fell
17	Kingsworthy	Ernest Acres	?	10-0	20/1	Pulled Up
01	Sheriff Hutton	John Morrell	?	10-0	50/1	Fell
22	Cruiskeen II	Terry Kavanagh	?	10-0	100/1	Pulled Up
24	St George	John Walsh (jr)	?	9-11	40/1	Knocked Over
02	Hob Nob	H Bax	?	9-11	40/1	Fell
?	Electric Spark	A Waddington	?	9-11	100/1	Pulled Up
24	Cushalu Mavourneen	H Smith	?	9-11	100/1	Pulled Up
22	Hall In	L Bland	?	9-7	100/1	Fell
