= Sam McMichael =

Australian rules footballer and cricketer

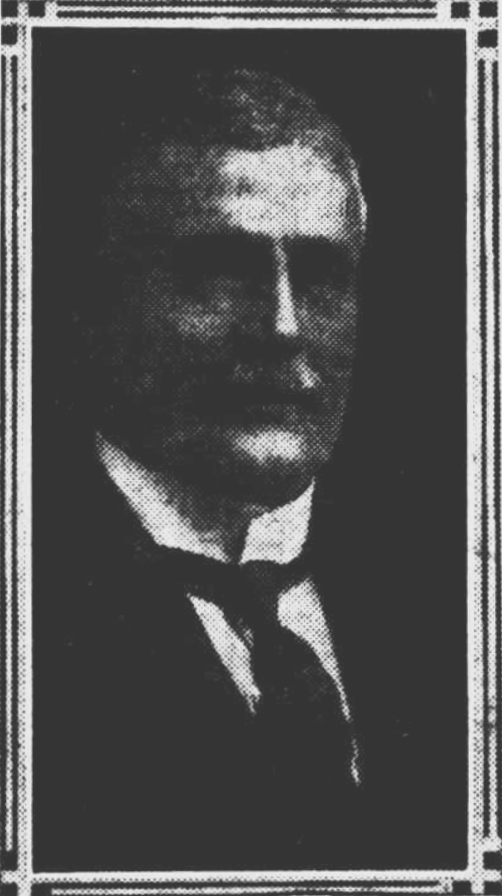

Personal information
- Full name: Samuel Albert McMichael
- Born: 18 July 1869; Clifton Hill, Victoria, Australia
- Died: 21 April 1923 (aged 53); Brighton, Victoria, Australia
- Batting: Right-handed
- Role: Batsman

Domestic team information
- Years: Team
- 1891/92–1903/04: Victoria

Career statistics
Competition	First-class
Matches	27
Runs scored	1,032
Batting average	24.57
100s/50s	0/6
Top score	97
Catches/stumpings	21/–
- Source: Cricinfo, 5 November 2021

Samuel Albert McMichael (18 July 1869 – 21 April 1923) was an Australian first-class cricketer who represented Victoria in the Sheffield Shield. He also played Australian rules football with Fitzroy in the Victorian Football League (VFL).

== Cricket ==
McMichael was a specialist batsman, scoring six half centuries for Victoria, with a highest score of 97, against South Australia at the Melbourne Cricket Ground.

He later served as manager of the Victorian team; during a match against Queensland at the Brisbane Cricket Ground in March 1903, McMichael saved a lady in the grandstand from injury when he caught a ball hit for six just centimetres from her face.

McMichael had a long career with East Melbourne Cricket Club, scoring more than 5000 runs with a highest score of 246 not out. He was also the club's secretary, credited with restoring the club's finances at a difficult time.

== Football ==
In the 1890s McMichael was a leading player for Fitzroy in the Victorian Football Association (VFA) and represented Victoria against South Australia.

Following the formation of the Victorian Football League (VFL), McMichael played ten games for Fitzroy during the 1897 inaugural VFL season, including Fitzroy's first VFL game, serving as captain in place of the injured Bill Cleary.

== Sports journalism ==
He also wrote for some years for the Sydney sports weekly, The Referee, under the nom de plume "The Onlooker".
