= Mat Wright =

English cricketer

Personal information
- Full name: Matthew William Wright
- Born: 24 July 1858; Keyworth, Nottinghamshire, England
- Died: 13 May 1949 (aged 90); Spital, Berkshire, England

Domestic team information
- Years: Team
- 1889: Nottinghamshire
- 1895–1913: Buckinghamshire

Career statistics
Competition	First-class
Matches	1
Runs scored	6
Batting average	3.00
100s/50s	0/0
Top score	6
Balls bowled	25
Wickets	0
Bowling average	–
5 wickets in innings	–
10 wickets in match	–
Best bowling	–
Catches/stumpings	0/–
- Source: Cricinfo, 4 June 2011

Matthew William Wright (24 July 1858 – 13 May 1949) was an English cricketer who played in one first-class cricket match in 1889. He was born in Keyworth, Nottinghamshire.

Wright made his only first-class appearance for Nottinghamshire against MCC. In Nottinghamshires' first-innings, he was run out for a duck. In their second-innings, he scored 6 runs before being dismissed by Frederick Martin.

He made his debut for Buckinghamshire in the 1895 Minor Counties Championship against Oxfordshire, a match which marked both teams debut in the competition. Wright played Minor counties cricket for Buckinghamshire from 1895 to 1913, making 143 appearances.

He died in Spital, Berkshire on 13 May 1949.
