= James O'Halloran (cricketer) =

Australian cricketer (1872–1943)

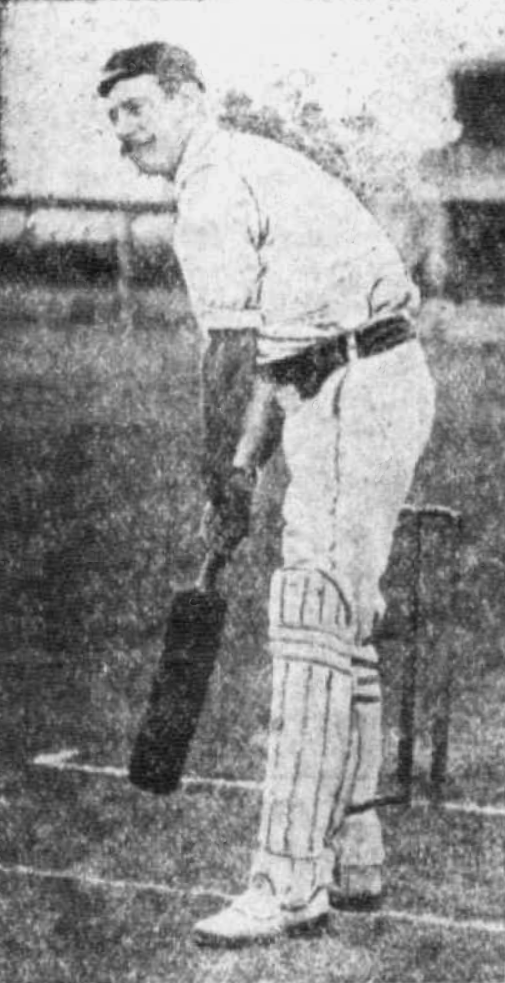

Personal information
- Born: 12 January 1872; Melbourne, Australia
- Died: 28 April 1943 (aged 71); Melbourne, Australia

Domestic team information
- Years: Team
- 1897: Victoria
- Source: Cricinfo, 26 July 2015

James O'Halloran (12 January 1872 – 28 April 1943) was an Australian cricketer. He played three first-class cricket matches for Victoria in 1897.

== See also ==
- List of Victoria first-class cricketers
