= Julius Seyler =

German painter and athlete (1873–1955)

Julius Seyler (4 May 1873 – 22 or 24 November 1955) was a German painter and athlete.

== Selected exhibitions ==
- 1902 erstmals im Glaspalast München (1. Auszeichnung), weiter im Glaspalast in den Jahren 1908, 1909, 1913, 1927, 1928
- 1912 Ausstellungen in Dresden, Leipzig und Rotterdam
- 1913 The Armory Show in New York (Europäische Impressionisten)
- 1922 Galerie Helbig München
- 1923 Kunstverein München
- 1925 Galerie Thannhauser, Luzern (Schweiz)
- 1928 Deutsche Kunst der Gegenwart, Nürnberg
- 1943 Maximilianeum, München
- 1951 Haus der Deutschen Kunst, München
- 1987 C. M. Russel-Museum, Great Falls (Montana)
- 1989 Amerika-Haus, München
- 1994 Gallery of the Visible Arts, University of Montana, USA
- 1999 Museum of the Rockies, Bozeman, Montana, USA and in the Deutsch-Amerikanisches Institut, Heidelberg
- 2003 (16. Januar - 9. März) Retrospektive in the Galerie of Bayerischen Landesbank München
- 2015 (ab 13. November) Farben. Kunst. Indianer. Der Münchner Impressionist Julius Seyler bei den Blackfeet im Museum Fünf Kontinente in München
