= William Forrester (racecourse owner) =

Australian racehorse owner

Personal information
- Nationality: Australian
- Born: 26 August 1842 Cornwallis, New South Wales, Australia
- Died: 23 August 1901 (aged 58) Warwick Farm, New South Wales
- Occupations: Thoroughbred racehorse trainer & breeder racing identity
- Spouses: Emily Maria (née Dargin); 1842-1917
- Children: Minnie Sophia Forrester; 1873–1874; Charles Albert Forrester; 1874–1939; Florence Louisa Forrester; 1876–1953; Gertie Emily Forrester; 1877–1947; Ellie May Forrester; 1881–1970

Horse racing career
- Sport: Horse racing

William Forrester (26 August 1842 – 23 August 1901) was an Australian racehorse and racecourse owner.

For many years it was believed that Forrester was descended from Robert Forrester a First Fleet convict. In July 2025 a descendant took a DNA test that proved he wasn't related to Robert. His mother Maria Carroll was a native of Dublin who was born around 1814 and had arrived in Sydney as a 21 year old Roman Catholic widow in 1836. In Ireland she had been a housemaid when she was convicted of stealing a book. At the time she could read but could not write. Maria was heavily pregnant when she married William Forrester senior (1802-1869) at St Matthew's Anglican Church, Windsor, in 1842. It now appears that he arrived in the world as "a non-paternal event" to use DNA terminally. William Forrester junior was brought up by William Forrester senior as his mother was often in gaol accused of illegally selling alcohol in the 1850s.

As an adult Forrester was known as Black Bill to distinguished him from a cousin also of the name William Forrester who was known as Red Bill due to his ginger complexion. He was a racehorse owner and trainer who owned Warwick Farm. Forrester achieved a quinella in the 1897 Melbourne Cup with the brother horses, Gaulus and The Grafter. The Grafter also won the Cup in 1898, surviving a protest.

In 1881, Forrester purchased land at what was originally called Warwick Park. He renamed it Warwick Farm to correspond with his own initials, and built a family homestead along with racing stables and a thoroughbred stud.

Forrester held the inaugural race meeting at Warwick Farm on 16 March 1889, after forming a syndicate called The Warwick Farm Racing Club. Forrester contested the Melbourne Cup 5 times with 2 wins.

His winnings would have been worth more than A$4 million, with trophies valued at A$70,000. Because of his gambling debts, Bill was almost destitute at the time of his death at age 57 on 23 August 1901. At one time, he allegedly wagered the deeds of his Warwick Farm house on a card game; he won. Forrester owned a large part of Warwick Farm Racecourse. It was later revealed he had sold much of his property to discharge his gambling debts.

After his death, Sydney Tattersalls Club opened a subscription to assist his widow, Emily, their 3 daughters and their son.

The Australian Jockey Club bought the Warwick Farm course in 1922, with the first meeting held in the refurbished surrounds in 1925. Many years after Forrester and his wife's death, and with the redevelopment of Liverpool cemetery, one of their daughters, Ellie May, had her parents remains exhumed and cremated at Northern Suburbs Crematorium. The ashes of Forrester's son, Charles Albert Forrester, were scattered near the present-day winning post at Warwick Farm after his death.
