= Mickey Roche =

Australian rules footballer and cricketer

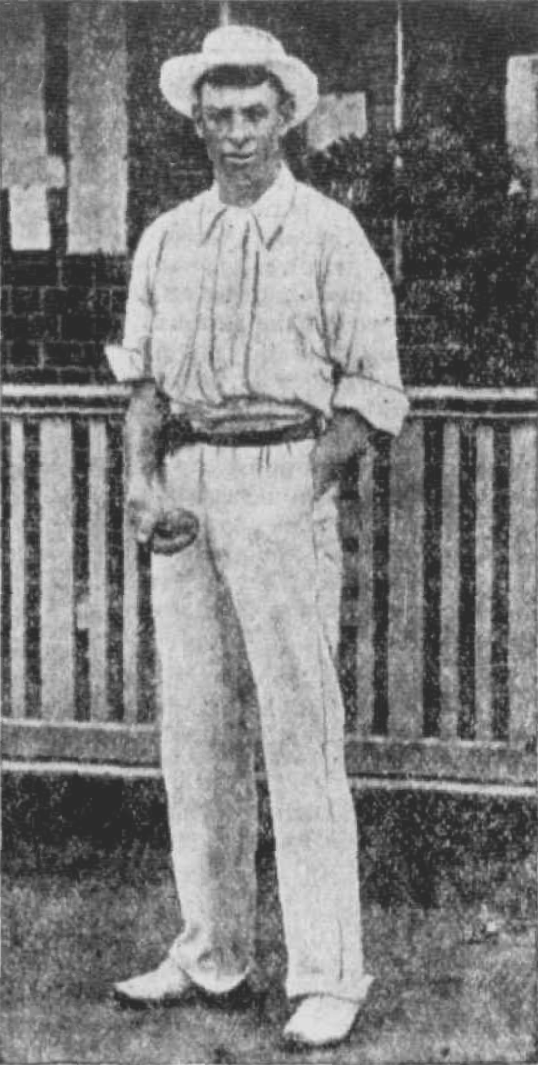
Mickey Roche, 1897.

William ("Mickey") Roche (born 20 July 1871, Brunswick, Victoria, Australia; died 2 January 1950, East Brunswick, Melbourne, Victoria, Australia) was an Australian cricketer who played in Australia and England.

Mickey (also known as Micky) Roche was an off-spinner and useful lower-order right-handed batsman who represented Victoria between 1895 and 1898. He also served Middlesex as a professional from 1897 and 1900. His best season was in 1899 when he took 60 wickets (which included 7 for 103 versus Lancashire). Whilst batting at number 11, he scored 74 not out versus Kent, adding a county record stand of 230 for the 10th wicket with Richard Nicholls. He notably only had two fingers and a thumb on his bowling hand.

Roche also played for the Melbourne Football Club between 1893 and 1895. In June 1895 he kicked six goals in a game, the most by any Melbourne played in the Victorian Football Association competition.

== See also ==
- List of Victoria first-class cricketers
