= Jack McCulloch =

Canadian speed skater and ice hockey player

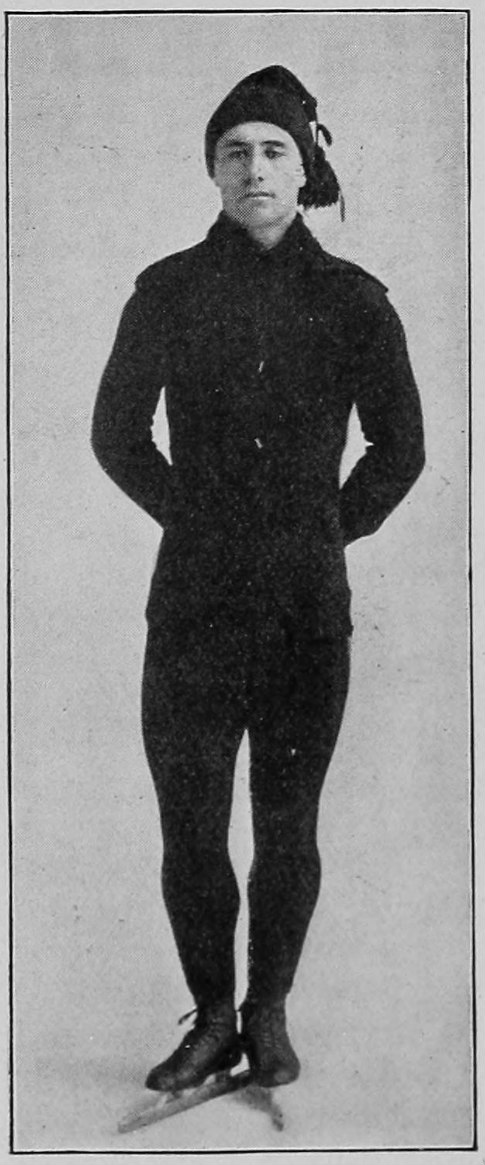
- Photo from Outing magazine, Vol. XXXI, Oct. 1897 – Mar. 1898
- Born: August 15, 1872 Perth, Ontario, Canada
- Died: January 26, 1918 (aged 45) Saint Paul, Minnesota, USA
- Position: Forward; Defense
- Played for: Winnipeg Victorias
- Playing career: 1891–1894

John K. McCulloch (August 15, 1872 – January 26, 1918) was a Canadian speed skater and ice hockey player. He won several Canadian amateur speed skating championships and one world championship.

== Sports career ==
An amateur skater from 1890 to 1898, during which time he was the dominant speed skater in Canada. In the 1897 world championships in Montreal in the 1,500-meter race, he and Alfred Næss finished in a dead heat, forcing a run-off. McCulloch won by two-fifths of a second.

In 1889, McCulloch helped found the Winnipeg Victorias hockey club, one of the first in western Canada. He participated in the first organized ice hockey game in Manitoba, and played for the hockey club for several years afterward. McCulloch was a multi-athlete and outside of speed skating and ice hockey he also excelled in roller skating, figure skating, track and field, rowing, canoeing and gymnastics. He is a member of the Canada and Manitoba Sports Halls of Fame.
