= 1892–93 Sheffield Shield season =

Australian cricket tournament

1892–93 Sheffield Shield
- Dates: 16 December 1892 – 21 March 1893
- Cricket format: First-class
- Tournament format: Double round-robin
- Champions: Victoria (1st title)
- Runners-up: New South Wales
- Participants: 3
- Matches: 6
- Attendance: 164,059 (27,343 per match)
- Most runs: George Giffen (468)
- Most wickets: George Giffen (33)
- Official website: ESPNcricinfo

The 1892–93 Sheffield Shield season was the first season of the Sheffield Shield, the domestic first-class cricket competition of Australia. It was contested by three of Australia's six states: New South Wales, South Australia, and Victoria. Victoria won the competition, winning all four of their matches. South Australia's George Giffen was the highest wicket-taker and also made the highest score both in an innings (181) and in the season overall (468).

== Teams ==
Grounds used during the 1892–93 Sheffield Shield season.

Team	Home ground(s)	Captain(s)
New South Wales	Association Ground, Sydney	Harry Moses (1–2); Alec Bannerman (3–4)
South Australia	Adelaide Oval, Adelaide	George Giffen
Victoria	Melbourne Cricket Ground, Melbourne	Jack Worrall (1); Jack Barrett (2); Jack Blackham (3); Harry Trott (4)

== Table ==
Pos	Team	Pld	W	L
1	Victoria	4	4	0
2	New South Wales	4	1	3
3	South Australia	4	1	3

Source: ESPNcricinfo

== Results ==
=== Match 1 ===
16–21 December 1892
Scorecard

New South Wales	v	South Australia (H)
337 (164.1 overs); Harry Donnan 120; George Giffen 6/133 (74.1 overs)		212 (97.3 overs); George Giffen 75; Michael Pierce 8/111 (46.3 overs)
148 (82.4 overs); Frank Iredale 36; George Giffen 6/58 (41.4 overs)		330 f/o (107.2 overs); John Lyons 124; Michael Pierce 5/154 (39.2 overs)

South Australia won by 57 runs
Adelaide Oval, Adelaide
Umpires: Charles Bannerman and George Searcy

- New South Wales won the toss and elected to bat.
- 18 December 1892 was a rest day.

=== Match 2 ===
24–29 December 1892
Scorecard

New South Wales	v	Victoria (H)
197 (120.5 overs); Harry Moses 77; Bob McLeod 6/54 (37.5 overs)		375 (136.5 overs); William Bruce 128; Michael Pierce 6/100 (42.5 overs)
364 (254.1 overs); Frank Iredale 101; Bob McLeod 5/98 (82.1 overs)		2/187 (64.3 overs); Harry Trott 70*; Michael Pierce 1/63 (19 overs)

Victoria won by 8 wickets
Melbourne Cricket Ground, Melbourne
Umpires: Charles Bannerman and Thomas Flynn

- New South Wales won the toss and elected to bat.
- 25 December 1892 was a rest day.

=== Match 3 ===
31 December 1892–4 January 1893
Scorecard

South Australia	v	Victoria (H)
73 (25.2 overs); George Giffen 32; Hugh Trumble 5/27 (13 overs)		180 (48.3 overs); Percy Lewis 85; Ernie Jones 5/60 (15 overs)
347 (157 overs); George Giffen 92; Hugh Trumble 5/93 (57 overs)		4/241 (100 overs); Harry Graham 86*; George Giffen 3/126 (50 overs)

Victoria won by 6 wickets
Melbourne Cricket Ground, Melbourne
Umpires: George Downs and Thomas Flynn

- Victoria won the toss and elected to field.
- 1 January 1893 was a rest day.

=== Match 4 ===
7–10 January 1893
Scorecard

(H) New South Wales	v	South Australia
335 (161.5 overs); Charles Richardson 75*; Ernie Jones 4/98 (44 overs)		183 (71.3 overs); Joseph Tardif 41; Charlie Turner 4/65 (33 overs)
		92 f/o (42.5 overs); Affie Jarvis 28; Charlie Turner 6/41 (21 overs)

New South Wales won by an innings and 60 runs
Association Ground, Sydney
Umpires: Charles Bannerman and George Downs

- New South Wales won the toss and elected to bat.
- 8 January 1893 was a rest day.

=== Match 5 ===
26–31 January 1893
Scorecard

Victoria	v	New South Wales (H)
331 (128.4 overs); Jack Blackham 64*; Arthur Coningham 4/90 (33 overs)		261 (158 overs); Frank Iredale 55; Bob McLeod 4/76 (51 overs)
261 (107.3 overs); William Bruce 86; Arthur Coningham 5/79 (36 overs)		99 (66 overs); Alec Bannerman 46; Hugh Trumble 5/33 (26 overs)

Victoria won by 232 runs
Association Ground, Sydney
Umpires: Charles Bannerman and Thomas Flynn

- Victoria won the toss and elected to bat.
- 29 January 1893 was a rest day.

=== Match 6 ===
16–21 March 1893
Scorecard

(H) South Australia	v	Victoria
242 (94.3 overs); John Lyons 72; Jim Phillips 6/39 (23.3 overs)		403 (146 overs); Frank Laver 104; George Giffen 9/147 (64 overs)
363 (144.5 overs); George Giffen 181; Jim Phillips 4/100 (44 overs)		5/203 (59 overs); John Stuckey 56; John Reedman 3/46 (16 overs)

Victoria won by 5 wickets
Adelaide Oval, Adelaide
Umpires: George Downs and Thomas Flynn

- South Australia won the toss and elected to bat.
- 19 March 1893 was a rest day.

== Statistics ==
=== Most runs ===
Player	Team	Mat.	Inn.	NO	Runs	HS	Ave.	100s	50s
George Giffen	South Australia	4	8	0	468	181	58.50	1	2
John Lyons	South Australia	4	8	0	342	124	42.75	1	2
Harry Trott	Victoria	4	8	1	304	70*	43.42	0	3
William Bruce	Victoria	3	6	0	283	128	47.16	1	1
Frank Iredale	New South Wales	4	7	0	282	101	40.28	1	1

=== High scores ===
Player	Team	HS	Opponent	Inn.	Ground	Dates
George Giffen	South Australia	181	Victoria	3rd	Adelaide Oval, Adelaide	16–21 March 1893
William Bruce	Victoria	128	New South Wales	2nd	Melbourne Cricket Ground, Melbourne	24–29 December 1892
John Lyons	South Australia	124	New South Wales	3rd	Adelaide Oval, Adelaide	16–21 December 1892
Harry Donnan	New South Wales	120	South Australia	1st	Adelaide Oval, Adelaide	16–21 December 1892
Frank Laver	Victoria	104	South Australia	2nd	Adelaide Oval, Adelaide	16–21 March 1893

=== Most wickets ===
Player	Team	Mat.	Overs	Mai.	Runs	Wickets	Econ.	Best	5WI	10WM
George Giffen	South Australia	4	350.2	123	759	33	2.16	9/147	4	2
Michael Pierce	New South Wales	4	206.4	28	622	25	3.00	8/111	3	1
Hugh Trumble	Victoria	3	229	109	298	22	1.30	5/27	3	1
Bob McLeod	Victoria	4	298	134	448	22	1.50	6/54	2	1
Ernie Jones	South Australia	4	172	41	425	15	2.47	5/60	1	0

=== Best figures ===
Player	Team	Best	Opponent	Inn.	Ground	Dates
George Giffen	South Australia	9/147	Victoria	2nd	Adelaide Oval, Adelaide	16–21 March 1893
Michael Pierce	New South Wales	8/111	South Australia	2nd	Adelaide Oval, Adelaide	16–21 December 1892
Jim Phillips	Victoria	6/39	South Australia	1st	Adelaide Oval, Adelaide	16–21 March 1893
Charlie Turner	New South Wales	6/41	South Australia	3rd	Association Ground, Sydney	7–10 January 1893
Bob McLeod	Victoria	6/54	New South Wales	1st	Melbourne Cricket Ground, Melbourne	24–29 December 1892
