= Jimmy Wootton =

English cricketer

Personal information
- Full name: James Wootton
- Born: 9 March 1860; Sutton-at-Hone, Kent, England
- Died: 21 February 1941 (aged 80); Leytonstone, Essex, England
- Height: 5 ft 6 in (1.68 m)
- Batting: Left-handed
- Bowling: Left-arm roundarm fast Slow left-arm orthodox

Domestic team information
- Years: Team
- 1880–1890: Kent
- 1884–1891: Marylebone Cricket Club
- 1895–1900: Hampshire

Career statistics
Competition	First-class
Matches	168
Runs scored	1,628
Batting average	7.98
100s/50s	0/1
Top score	53
Balls bowled	35,067
Wickets	761
Bowling average	18.16
5 wickets in innings	60
10 wickets in match	17
Best bowling	8/27
Catches/stumpings	92/–
- Source: Cricinfo, 4 March 2010

James Wootton (9 March 1860 — 21 February 1941) was an English professional cricketer who played first-class cricket predominantly for Kent, Hampshire, and the Marylebone Cricket Club. Wootton would become one of the finest slow left-arm bowlers of the 1880s, having great success with Kent between 1884 and 1888. Playing in 115 first-class matches for Kent from 1880 to 1890, he took nearly 600 wickets. He later coached cricket at Winchester College and played for Hampshire upon their admittance to the County Championship in 1895, making 37 appearances up to 1900. He retired from coaching at Winchester in 1911.

== Early life ==
The son of Edward Wootton and his wife, Frances, he was born on 9 March 1860 in Sutton-at-Hone, Kent. After leaving education at the age of 14, he was employed as a stable hand with a local landowner and was considered a good enough horseman to accompany Lord Harris on hunts. Beginning in 1874, he spent the next three years playing club cricket for Farningham as a left-arm roundarm fast bowler against some of the strongest club sides in Kent. His work commitments meant he was unable to play cricket in 1878, but in 1879 he decided to pursue a career as a professional cricketer with the Yalding Club. In 1880 he played his club cricket for Erith, for whom that season he took 74 wickets at an average of just over 4 runs per wicket.

== Cricket career ==
=== Kent ===
Wootton's prowess as a bowler in club cricket for Erith came to the attention of Kent in May 1880, when he was selected to represent their Colts side. Two months later, after two successive defeats against Derbyshire and Lancashire, he was selected in the Kent side and made his debut in first-class cricket against Sussex at Hove. He was late arriving at the ground because he had been absent from home, and did not immediately see the telegram calling him up to play. He claimed six wickets in the match, while in his next match against Surrey, he took his maiden five wicket haul with figures of 8 for 34 in Surrey's second innings, and overall match figures of 12 for 89. During his debut season, he made six first-class appearances and took 38 wickets at an average of 12.57.

The following season, Wootton took 48 wickets at an average of 21.06 from thirteen matches, though Wisden opined that his returns during the season "fell off" when compared to his debut season. He formed a bowling partnership with Dick Penn during the season, with the pair bowling unchanged against Sussex to dismiss them for scores of 56 and 72 runs. His bowling return in 1882 was similar to that of 1881, with 48 wickets at an average of 18.62; notably against Lancashire at Old Trafford, where he took match figures of 12 for 91. In 1883, he had a quiet beginning and middle of the season, but toward the end of the season he had some notable bowling performances, finding further success against Lancashire when he took match figures of 13 for 84 at Gravesend.

Up until 1884, Wootton had been classified as a roundarm fast bowler. However, that season he became a slow left-arm orthodox bowler, possessing in his repertoire a faster "arm ball" which was remarked upon by the magazine Cricket as his most dangerous delivery. His change in bowling style heralded his most effective period as a bowler, with Wootton taking a hundred wickets in a season for the first time in 1884, with 117 from 21 matches at an average of 16.77. He bowled the majority of Kent's overs during the season, bowling 500 more than his nearest compatriot. Against the touring Australians during Canterbury Cricket Week, he contributed toward Kent's 96 runs victory by dismissing George Bonnor, George Giffen, Billy Midwinter and Billy Murdoch in the Australians first innings. During the season, he obtained employment as a ground bowler at Lord's under the influence of Lord Harris, making a first-class appearance for the Marylebone Cricket Club (MCC) against Nottinghamshire. He also played twice for the South against the Australians.

Though he made fewer first-class appearances (15) in 1885, Wootton still found success with the ball. He narrowly fell short of taking 100 wickets in the season, claiming 90 at an average of 15.08. He had endured a quiet start to the season, but from July onward his form improved; he claimed his career-best figures of 8 for 39 against Hampshire, amongst other noteworthy performances in the second half of the season. He once again played for the MCC in 1885, making two appearances. He enjoyed his greatest success as a bowler during the 1886 season, when he took 143 wickets at an average of 15.95 from 25 matches; throughout the season, he took five wickets or more in an innings on 14 occasions and took ten wickets in a match on five. He bettered his career-best figures obtained the previous season, when he took 8 for 28 against Lancashire. He enjoyed further success against the touring Australians, taking a five wicket haul in each of their innings to help Kent to victory by ten wickets. He had earlier played against the Australians at Chichester, where he had taken 6 for 78 playing for an ad hoc team managed by and named for the Earl of March.

Wootton had to contend with a bruised thumb for the early part of the 1887 season, but despite this he still led the Kent attack and bowled over 1,500 overs throughout the season. He took 100 wickets at an average of 18.92 from 21 matches, and ended the season as Kent's leading wicket-taker and topped their bowling averages. He played several matches for the MCC during the 1887 season, in addition to playing for the Players of the South against the Players of the North at Beckenham. His first appearance the following season was for C. I. Thornton's XI against the touring Australians at Norbury, taking six wickets in the match, which the Australians won by six wickets. In the Kent side, he found himself increasingly in competition with fellow left-arm bowlers George Hearne, Fred Martin, and Walter Wright. Coupled with injury and illness, he found his opportunities in the Kent team reduced. In thirteen first-class matches in 1888, Wootton took 54 wickets at an average of 15.83.

Over the following seasons he played first-class cricket intermittently, resulting in a dramatic decline in his bowling. His decline was attributed to his workload during his career, with Carlaw remarking that Wootton had virtually lost all the muscle in his left arm and was required to bowl with his arm in plaster. He made his final appearance for Kent against Sussex in the 1890 County Championship, which was the inaugural running of the competition. His benefit year was deferred by the Kent committee in 1891, with the committee holding the view that it would not be expedient to give two players (the other John Pentecost) benefit matches in the 1892 season; he was eventually granted a benefit in 1894, which raised £316.

=== Hampshire ===
Beginning in 1891, Wootton was employed as the cricket coach at Winchester College in Hampshire. The County Championship was expanded to fourteen teams in 1895, with Hampshire amongst the newly admitted county sides. Seeking the services of a player with first-class experience, Hampshire signed Wootton. He debuted for Hampshire in the 1895 County Championship against Somerset, finding his appearances limited to the latter half of the season due to his term-time commitments at Winchester College. In his first season with Hampshire, he made eleven appearances, taking 37 wickets at an average of 19.48. The following season, he made eight appearances and took 13 wickets, though by this point his bowling average exceeded 48. He scored his only first-class half century during the 1896 season, making 53 runs against Somerset at Southampton. Four years later, he played for Hampshire in the 1900 County Championship, making five appearances; in these, he took 19 wickets at an average of 27.36.

=== Records and playing style ===
After becoming a slow left-arm bowler, Wootton was considered during the mid-to-late 1880s to be the best bowler of his type outside the North of England. He was described by Wisden as a bowler of "high skill", who made clever use of flighting his deliveries to make up for his moderate height of 5 ft 6 in (1.68 m). He was also adept at varying his pace, which required batsmen to be watchful. Despite his reputation, he was unable to gain a Test cap, largely due to the presence of fellow slow-left arm bowlers Johnny Briggs, Ted Peate, and Bobby Peel in the England team. Lord Harris noted that amongst his faults was a prevalence to bowl half volleys on unresponsive pitches.

For Kent, he took 597 wickets at an average of 17.14 from 115 first-class matches; he took five wickets in an innings on 49 occasions for Kent, and ten wickets in a match on 15. Later for Hampshire, he took 69 wickets at an average of 27.05 from 37 first-class matches, taking five wickets in an innings on five occasions. He also took 62 wickets at an average of 15.72 playing for the MCC in 18 appearances between 1884 and 1891. His overall first-class career yielded him 761 wickets at an average of 18.16. A tailend batsman, Wootton had a poor batting reputation at Kent, where he made 62 ducks. His batting had improved by the time he joined Hampshire, an improvement that was credited to his coaching at Winchester.

== Personal life and death ==
Wootton married Flora Elizabeth Everest (1862–1941) at Farningham in 1885; the couple had two sons and a daughter. He retired from coaching at Winchester in 1911. He died in Leytonstone on 21 February 1941.

== Works cited ==
- Carlaw, Derek (2020). Kent County Cricketers A to Z. Part One: 1806–1914 (PDF). Cardiff: ACS. ISBN 978-1-8577-0250-7.
- Lyttelton, Robert Henry (1922). Fifty Years of Sport at Oxford, Cambridge and the Great Public Schools: Eton, Harrow and Winchester. London: W. Southwood. OCLC 1493281321.
