= Australian cricket team in England in 1888 =

International cricket tour

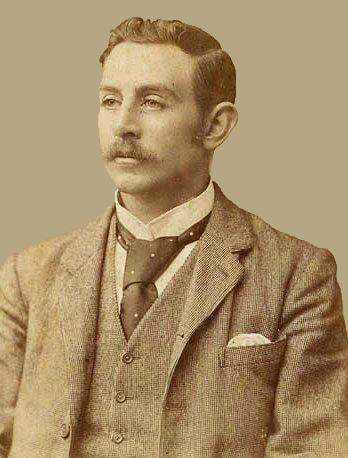
Charlie Turner claimed 283 wickets in first-class matches for Australia in England during 1888.

The Australian cricket team in England in 1888 played 37 first-class matches including three Tests. England won the series 2–1, after losing the first Test. The next time England would come back from one down to win a three-match Test series at home was 132 years later, in July 2020, when they beat the West Indies 2–1.

== Touring party ==
- Alick Bannerman
- Jack Blackham (wicket-keeper)
- George Bonnor
- Harry Boyle
- Jack Edwards
- John Ferris
- Affie Jarvis (wicket-keeper)
- Sammy Jones
- John Lyons
- Percy McDonnell (captain)
- Harry Trott
- Charlie Turner
- Sammy Woods
- Jack Worrall

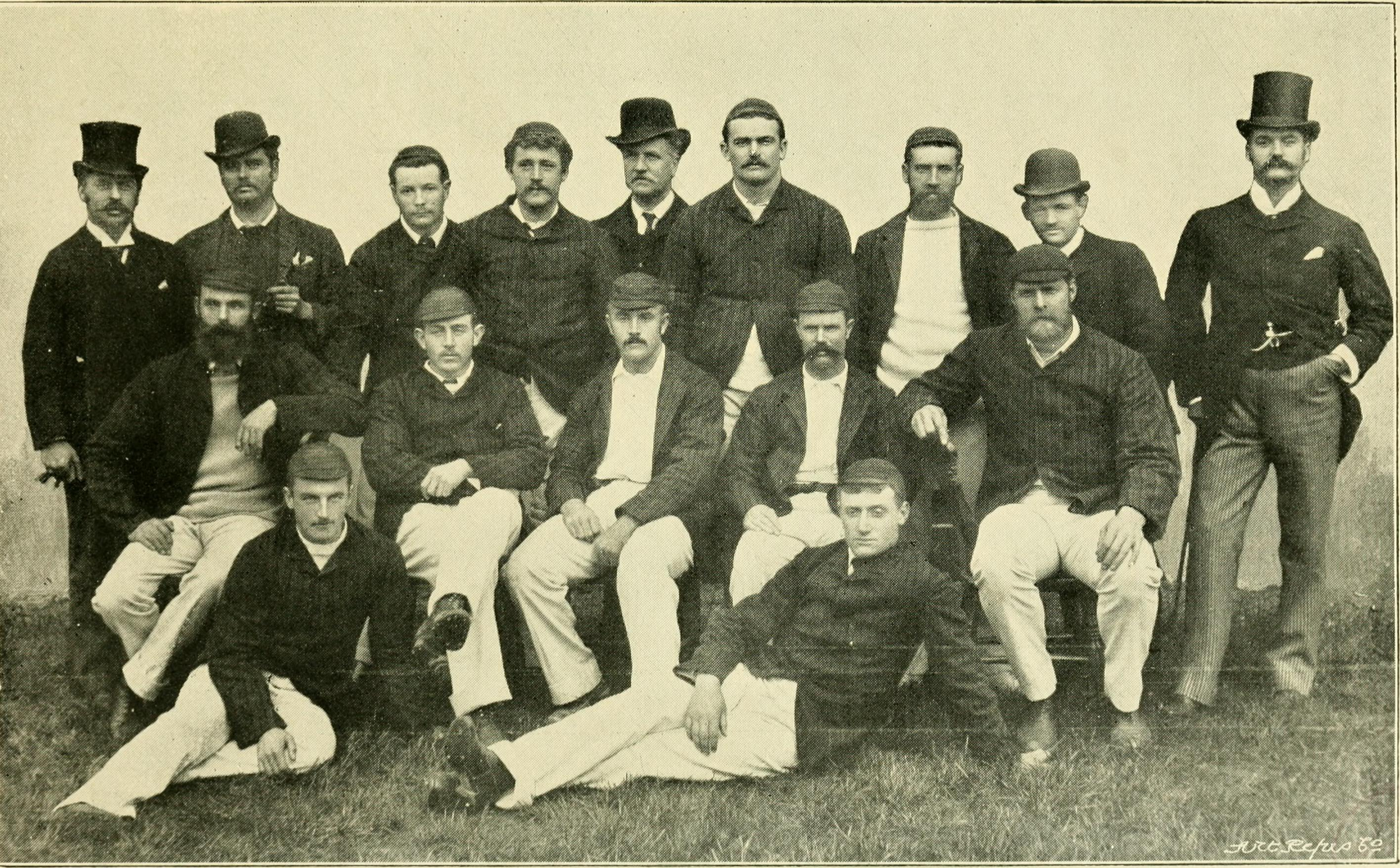
The 1888 Australia national cricket team

== Test matches ==
=== First Test ===
Australian captain Percy McDonnell won the toss and chose to bat first. The visitors scored 116 runs in their innings, during which only Percy McDonnell, Jack Blackham and Test debutant Jack Edwards scored 20 runs or more. The English bowlers, led by Bobby Peel, who claimed four wickets and Johnny Briggs, who took three, ran through the Australian batting line-up. At the close of play on the opening day, England had scored eighteen runs for the loss of three wickets (18/3).

Resuming at 11.30 on day two, the score was lifted to 22, on which score England lost Walter Read, W. G. Grace (failing to add to his overnight ten), and Tim O'Brien. When Steel fell four runs later, England were seven wickets down and still eleven runs short of avoiding the follow-on. Thanks to Briggs, who top-scored for England with seventeen runs, the hosts managed to reach 53 from exactly fifty overs, after 55 minutes of play on the second day. The famous combination of John Ferris and Charlie Turner took eight of the wickets to fall, Turner picking up a five-for.

When Ferris and Turner arrived at the wicket in Australia's second innings, they found their side on eighteen for seven, with Lohmann and Peel demolishing the top- and middle-order. Turner scored a dozen and Ferris twelve, but The Daily Telegraph remarked that "it has to be said that never in the annals of cricket has such a fortunate innings as that of Ferris been compiled".

England needed 124 to win, but it managed to get only halfway. Of the home team's second innings of 62, Grace scored 24, "far and away the best batting display of the match," said the Daily Telegraph. Allan Steel, the captain, also chipped in with an unbeaten ten, but he was the only other batsman to reach double figures. Turner and Ferris claimed five wickets each, making for match figures of ten for 63 and eight for 45 respectively. The aforementioned newspaper, however, believed that Peel's first innings' four for 36 was a far better performance, as the wicket had been easier than at any other stage of the match.

This win was Australia's first over England since that at Sydney three years earlier. After that, the Antipodeans had been defeated on seven successive occasions. In the eight years since the 1880 visit, this was only Australia's second win in England, the other being the famous Test at the Oval in 1882.

16 – 17 July
Scorecard

Australia	v	England
116 (71.2 overs); Percy McDonnell & Jack Blackham 22; Bobby Peel 4/36		53 (50 overs); Johnny Briggs 17; Charlie Turner 5/27
60 (29.2 overs); John Ferris 20*; Bobby Peel 4/14		62 (47 overs); W. G. Grace 24; John Ferris 5/26

Australia won by 61 runs
Lord's, London
Umpires: Frank Farrands and Charles Pullin

- Australia won the toss and decided to bat.

=== Second Test ===
13 – 14 August
Scorecard

Australia	v	England
80 (90.3 overs); Jack Edwards 26; Johnny Briggs 5/25		317 (138.2 overs); Bobby Abel 70; Charlie Turner 6/112
100 (69.2 overs); Percy McDonnell 32; Billy Barnes 5/32

England won by an innings and 137 runs
The Oval, London
Umpires: Robert Carpenter and Frank Farrands

- Australia won the toss and decided to bat.

=== Third Test ===
30 – 31 August
Scorecard

England	v	Australia
172 (113.1 overs); W. G. Grace 38; Charlie Turner 5/86		81 (52.2 overs); John Lyons 22; Bobby Peel 7/31
		70 (31.1 overs); John Lyons 32; Bobby Peel 4/37

England won by an innings and 21 runs
Old Trafford, Manchester
Umpires: Frank Farrands and Charles Pullin

- England won the toss and decided to bat.

== Other first-class matches ==
No.	Date	Opponents	Venue	Result	Ref
1	7–8 May	CI Thornton's XI	JW Hobbs Ground, Norbury	Won by six wickets	
2	14–15 May	Surrey	The Oval, London	Won by an innings and 154 runs	
3	17–19 May	Oxford University	Christ Church Ground, Oxford	Won by an innings and 19 runs	
4	21–22 May	Yorkshire	Bramall Lane, Sheffield	Won by an innings and 64 runs	
5	24–25 May	Lancashire	Old Trafford, Manchester	Won by 23 runs	
6	28–29 May	Gentlemen of England	Lord's, London	Drawn	
7	31 May–1 June	Players	The Oval, London	Lost by ten wickets	
8	4–5 June	Nottinghamshire	Trent Bridge, Nottingham	Lost by ten wickets	
9	7–9 June	Cambridge University	Fenner's, Cambridge	Drawn	
10	11–13 June	Oxford University Past and Present	County Ground, Leyton	Won by 74 runs	
11	14–16 June	Middlesex	Lord's, London	Won by eight wickets	
12	18–20 June	England XI	Edgbaston, Birmingham	Won by ten wickets	
13	21–23 June	Marylebone Cricket Club	Lord's, London	Won by 14 runs	
14	25–27 June	Yorkshire	Park Avenue, Bradford	Drawn	
15	28–30 June	North	Old Trafford, Manchester	Won by five wickets	
16	2–4 July	Liverpool and District	Aigburth, Liverpool	Won by 130 runs	
17	12–13 July	England XI	County Ground, Stoke-on-Trent	Won by an innings and 135 runs	
18	19–21 July	Sussex	County Ground, Hove	Lost by 58 runs	
19	23–25 July	Cambridge University Past and Present	County Ground, Leyton	Drawn	
20	26–28 July	Yorkshire	Fartown, Huddersfield	Drawn	
21	30 July–1 August	Surrey	The Oval, London	Drawn	
22	2–4 August	England XI	Central Recreation Ground, Hastings	Won by an innings and 27 runs	
23	6–8 August	Kent	St Lawrence Ground, Canterbury	Won by 81 runs	
24	9–11 August	Gloucestershire	Clifton College Close Ground, Bristol	Lost by 257 runs	
25	16–18 August	Nottinghamshire	Trent Bridge, Nottingham	Lost by an innings and 199 runs	
26	20–22 August	Gloucestershire	College Ground, Cheltenham	Lost by eight wickets	
27	23–25 August	England XI	Crystal Palace Park, London	Lost by 78 runs	
28	27–29 August	Oxford and Cambridge Universities Past and Present	United Services Recreation Ground, Portsmouth	Drawn	
29	3–4 September	England XI	St George's Road, Harrogate	Won by 56 runs	
30	6–8 September	Lord Londesborough's XI	North Marine Road Ground, Scarborough	Lost by 155 runs	
31	10–12 September	A Shrewsbury's Australian Team	Recreation Ground, Holbeck	Lost by four wickets	
32	13–14 September	A Shrewsbury's Australian Team	Old Trafford, Manchester	Lost by nine wickets	
33	17–19 September	South	Central Recreation Ground, Hastings	Won by nine wickets	
34	20–22 September	Surrey	The Oval, London	Won by 34 runs	

=== Results ===
First-class matches, excluding Test matches
Played	Won by Australia	Lost by Australia	Drawn
34	17 (50.0%)	10 (29.4%)	7 (20.6%)

== Batting averages ==
Player	Matches	Innings	Runs	Average	Highest Score	100s	50s
Percy McDonnell	35	58	1,331	23.35	105	1	6
George Bonnor	36	60	1,155	20.26	119	2	5
Harry Trott	36	61	1,081	18.32	73	0	3
Alick Bannerman	33	59	887	17.05	93*	0	3
Charlie Turner	36	56	789	14.61	103	1	1
Affie Jarvis	31	48	569	12.64	39	0	0
Jack Worrall	36	57	517	11.00	46	0	0
Qualification: 500 runs. Source: CricketArchive.

== Bowling averages ==
Player	Matches	Balls	Wickets	Average	BBI	5wi
Charlie Turner	36	9,702	283	11.68	9/15	12
John Ferris	37	8,321	199	14.74	8/41	3
Harry Trott	36	1,916	43	25.83	5/74	1
Qualification: 40 wickets. Source: CricketArchive.
