= English cricket team in Australia in 1897–98 =

International cricket tour

An England cricket team toured Australia in the 1897–98 season to play a five-match Test series against the Australia national cricket team. The team was captained by Andrew Stoddart and, except in the Test matches when it was called England, it was generally known as A. E. Stoddart's XI. The playing strength of the team was weakened by Stoddart acceding to a request from the Australians to bring “new blood”. As a result, established players including JT Brown, Albert Ward and Bobby Peel were not selected.

Stoddart only played in the third and fourth Test matches, following the news before the first Test that his mother had died. Archie MacLaren captained England in the first, second and fifth Tests. England won the first Test comfortably by nine wickets after Ranjitsinhji played one of the great Test innings. Weakened by illness he batted at number 7 he scored 175 in 223 minutes, hitting 26 fours, a performance which set up the victory. Australia then emphatically won the next four Tests.

Australia, captained by Harry Trott, therefore regained The Ashes. Australia were well served in batting by Joe Darling (he scored 537 runs, including three centuries), Clem Hill and Charlie McLeod; and in bowling by Ernie Jones, Monty Noble and Hugh Trumble. J. T. Hearne and Tom Richardson were England's most successful bowlers but the team was largely let down by its batting, with only MacLaren and Ranjitsinhji earning any distinction.

The English team played a total of 23 matches on tour: five Tests; seven first-class matches against state teams; and eleven minor matches against local teams. In the state matches, Stoddart's XI won three, drew three and lost one.

== Players ==
The English party consisted of thirteen players, twelve of whom played for England in the Test series:

- Jack Board (Gloucestershire; wicketkeeper; did not play in any of the Test matches)
- Johnny Briggs (Lancashire)
- Frank Druce (Cambridge University and Surrey)
- Tom Hayward (Surrey)
- J. T. Hearne (Middlesex)
- George Hirst (Yorkshire)
- Archie MacLaren (Lancashire; vice-captain)
- Jack Mason (Kent)
- KS Ranjitsinhji (Sussex)
- Tom Richardson (Surrey)
- Andrew Stoddart (Middlesex; captain)
- Bill Storer (Derbyshire; wicketkeeper)
- Ted Wainwright (Yorkshire)

The following players represented Australia in the Test series:

- Joe Darling (South Australia)
- Syd Gregory (New South Wales)
- Clem Hill (South Australia)
- Bill Howell (New South Wales)
- Frank Iredale (New South Wales)
- Ernie Jones (South Australia)
- Jim Kelly (New South Wales; wicketkeeper)
- Jack Lyons (South Australia)
- Tom McKibbin (New South Wales)
- Charlie McLeod (Victoria)
- Monty Noble (New South Wales)
- Harry Trott (Victoria; captain)
- Hugh Trumble (Victoria)
- Jack Worrall (Victoria)

== Test series summary ==
Australia won the Test series 4–1.

=== First Test ===
13–17 December 1897
(Timeless Test)
Scorecard

England	v	Australia
551 (175 overs); KS Ranjitsinhji 175; CE McLeod 3/80 (28 overs)		237 (100.1 overs); H Trumble 70; JT Hearne 5/42 (20.1 overs)
96/1 (28 overs); AC MacLaren 50*; TR McKibbin 1/22 (5 overs)		408 (f/o) (121 overs); J Darling 101; JT Hearne 4/99 (38 overs)

England won by 9 wickets
Sydney Cricket Ground, Sydney
Umpires: C Bannerman and J Phillips

- England won the toss and elected to bat.
- JR Mason, W Storer, NF Druce and GH Hirst (all ENG) made their Test debuts.

=== Second Test ===
1–5 January 1898
(Timeless Test)
Scorecard

Australia	v	England
520 (185 overs); CE McLeod 112; J Briggs 3/96 (40 overs)		315 (119.5 overs); KS Ranjitsinhji 71; H Trumble 4/54 (26.5 overs)
		150 (f/o) (65.4 overs); AC MacLaren 38; MA Noble 6/49 (17 overs)

Australia won by an innings and 55 runs
Melbourne Cricket Ground, Melbourne
Umpires: C Bannerman and J Phillips

- Australia won the toss and elected to bat.
- 2 January was taken as a rest day.
- MA Noble (AUS) made his Test debut.

=== Third Test ===
14–19 January 1898
(Timeless Test)
Scorecard

Australia	v	England
573 (214.2 overs); J Darling 178; T Richardson 4/164 (56 overs)		278 (126.5 overs); GH Hirst 85; WP Howell 4/70 (54 overs)
		282 (f/o) (144 overs); AC MacLaren 124; CE McLeod 5/65 (48 overs)

Australia won by an innings and 13 runs
Adelaide Oval, Adelaide
Umpires: C Bannerman and J Phillips

- Australia won the toss and elected to bat.
- 16 January was taken as a rest day
- WP Howell (AUS) made his Test debut.

=== Fourth Test ===
29 January–2 February 1898
(Timeless Test)
Scorecard

Australia	v	England
323 (101.4 overs); C Hill 188; JT Hearne 6/98 (35.4 overs)		174 (61.1 overs); JR Mason 30; E Jones 4/56 (12 overs)
115/2 (39.4 overs); CE McLeod 64*; TW Hayward 2/24 (10 overs)		263 (f/o) (114.2 overs); KS Ranjitsinhji 55; CE McLeod 2/11 (8.2 overs)

Australia won by 8 wickets
Melbourne Cricket Ground, Melbourne
Umpires: C Bannerman and J Phillips

- Australia won the toss and elected to bat.
- 30 January was taken as a rest day.

=== Fifth Test ===
26 February–2 March 1898
(Timeless Test)
Scorecard

England	v	Australia
335 (129.2 overs); AC MacLaren 65; E Jones 6/82 (26.2 overs)		239 (100.1 overs); CE McLeod 64; T Richardson 8/94 (36.1 overs)
178 (78.1 overs); TW Hayward 43; H Trumble 4/37 (24 overs)		276/4 (62.4 overs); J Darling 160; T Richardson 2/110 (21.4 overs)

Australia won by 6 wickets
Sydney Cricket Ground, Sydney
Umpires: C Bannerman and J Phillips

- England won the toss and elected to bat.
- 27 February was taken as a rest day

== Annual reviews ==
- Wisden Cricketers' Almanack 1899
