= Michael Pierce =

Michael Pierce may refer to:

- Mike Pierce (born 1980), American mixed martial artist
- Michael Pierce (American football) (born 1992), American football nose tackle
- Michael Pierce (cricketer) (1869–1913), Australian cricketer

== See also ==
- Michael Pearce (disambiguation)
- Michael Pierce Milliken (born 1947), American Episcopal bishop
