= William Solomon =

William Solomon may refer to:

- William Solomon (cricketer) (1872–1964), South African cricketer
- William Henry Solomon (1852–1930), judge of appeal and Chief Justice of South Africa
- William T. Solomon, American, former president, CEO and chairman of Austin Industries
- Will Solomon (born 1978), American basketball player
