= Daniel McLeod =

Australian cricketer

Personal information
- Born: 29 March 1872; Melbourne, Australia
- Died: 25 November 1901 (aged 29); Melbourne, Australia

Domestic team information
- Years: Team
- 1893–1895: Victoria
- Source: Cricinfo, 26 July 2015

Daniel McLeod (29 March 1872 – 25 November 1901) was an Australian cricketer. He played two first-class cricket matches for Victoria between 1893 and 1895. Daniel was the brother of Bob and Charlie McLeod, who were also cricketers.

== See also ==
- List of Victoria first-class cricketers
