= George Bean (cricketer) =

English cricketer

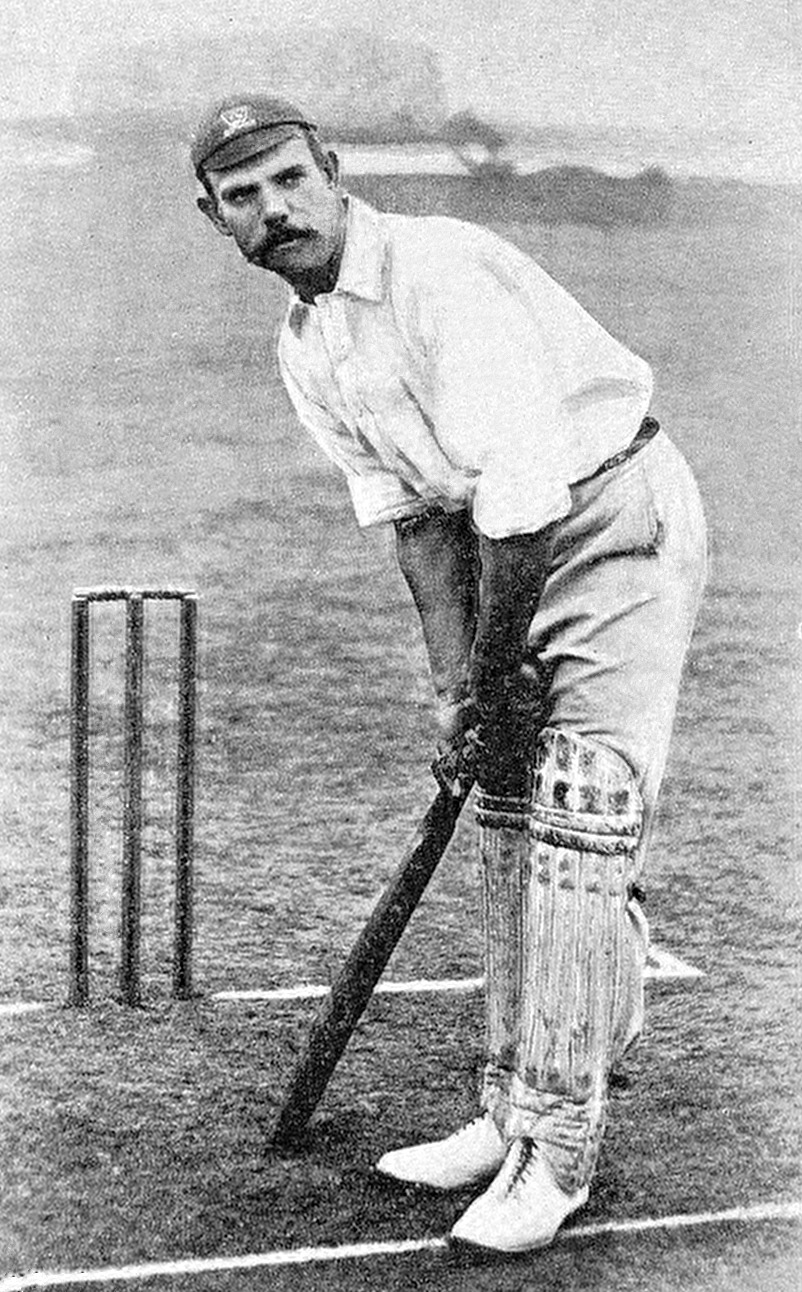
- George Bean

Cricket information
- Batting: Right-handed
- Bowling: Right-arm medium

International information
- National side: England
- Test debut: 1 January 1892 v Australia
- Last Test: 28 March 1892 v Australia

Career statistics
Competition	Test	First-class
Matches	3	247
Runs scored	92	8,634
Batting average	18.40	20.70
100s/50s	0/1	9/40
Top score	50	186
Balls bowled	–	17,076
Wickets	–	260
Bowling average	–	27.25
5 wickets in innings	–	9
10 wickets in match	–	2
Best bowling	–	8/29
Catches/stumpings	4/–	154/–
- Source: CricketArchive, 30 December 2021

George Bean (7 March 1864 – 16 March 1923) was a cricketer who played first-class cricket for Sussex County Cricket Club between 1886 and 1898. He also played three Test matches for England in 1891–92.

== Career ==
In 1885 Bean played an unsuccessful season for his home county of Nottinghamshire before moving on to Sussex. His most successful season was in 1891, which earned him a place on Lord Sheffield's tour to Australia in 1891/2, but he did not excel himself on the tour, and his form suffered further in 1892, ruling him out of further England contention. He had his Sussex benefit in 1893. After playing for Sussex, he moved onto the Lord's groundstaff and was a senior member there on his death. He had a successful benefit at Lord's in 1921.

== Death ==
Bean died of pneumonia on 16 March 1923. His wife was Eliza predeceased him by approximately 9 years.
