= History of Australian cricket from 1890–91 to 1900 =

This article describes the history of Australian cricket from the 1890–91 season until 1900.

As in England, cricket in Australia from about 1890 until the First World War has been recalled as a Golden Age. The 1890s saw the emergence of Australian players like Joe Darling, Clem Hill, Monty Noble and Victor Trumper, who were famous in both Australia and England.

== Domestic cricket ==
The highlight of the decade was the establishment of the famous Sheffield Shield to be contested as a national championship by Australian colonial sides from the 1892–93 season. The Shield was donated by Lord Sheffield during the 1891–92 tour by his England XI, captained by W G Grace.

For details of domestic matches in the 1890s, including Sheffield Shield contests, see List of Australian intercolonial cricket matches and Intercolonial cricket in Australia.

== Sheffield Shield winners ==
- 1892–93 – Victoria
- 1893–94 – South Australia
- 1894–95 – Victoria
- 1895–96 – New South Wales
- 1896–97 – New South Wales
- 1897–98 – Victoria
- 1898–99 – Victoria
- 1899-1900 – New South Wales

== Leading players by season ==
The lists below give the leading first-class runscorers and wicket-takers in each domestic season.

=== Batsmen ===
- 1890–91 – George Giffen 275 runs @ 91.66 (HS 237)
- 1891–92 – Jack Lyons 557 @ 55.70 (HS 145)
- 1892–93 – George Giffen 468 @ 58.50 (HS 181)
- 1893–94 – George Giffen 526 @ 75.14 (HS 205)
- 1894–95 – Albert Ward 916 @ 41.63 (HS 219)
- 1895–96 – Harry Donnan 626 @ 69.55 (HS 160)
- 1896–97 – Jack Lyons 404 @ 57.71 (HS 113)
- 1897–98 – Clem Hill 1196 @ 66.44 (HS 200)
- 1898–99 – Victor Trumper 873 @ 62.35 (HS 292*)
- 1899-1900 – Victor Trumper 721 @ 72.10 (HS 208)

=== Bowlers ===
- 1890–91 – Jim Phillips 25 wickets @ 10.00 (BB 7–20)
- 1891–92 – George Giffen 50 @ 17.30 (BB 9–96)
- 1892–93 – George Giffen 33 @ 23.00 (BB 9–147)
- 1893–94 – Charlie Turner 30 @ 12.30 (BB 6–51)
- 1894–95 – George Giffen 93 @ 22.54 (BB 8–77)
- 1895–96 – Tom McKibbin 46 @ 23.86 (BB 8–93)
- 1896–97 – Tom McKibbin 44 @ 14.88 (BB 8–74)
- 1897–98 – Ernie Jones 76 @ 21.75 (BB 7–80)
- 1898–99 – Ernie Jones 45 @ 27.53 (BB 6–154)
- 1899-1900 – Monty Noble 37 @ 20.64 (BB 6–91)

== International tours of Australia ==
=== England 1891–92 ===
- 1st Test at Melbourne Cricket Ground – Australia won by 54 runs
- 2nd Test at Sydney Cricket Ground – Australia won by 72 runs
- 3rd Testat Adelaide Oval – England won by an innings and 230 runs

For information about this tour, see : English cricket team in Australia in 1891-92

=== England 1894–95 ===
- 1st Test at Sydney Cricket Ground – England won by 10 runs
- 2nd Test at Melbourne Cricket Ground – England won by 94 runs
- 3rd Test at Adelaide Oval – Australia won by 382 runs
- 4th Test at Sydney Cricket Ground – Australia won by an innings and 147 runs
- 5th Test at Melbourne Cricket Ground – England won by 6 wickets

For information about this tour, see : English cricket team in Australia in 1894-95

=== England 1897–98 ===
- 1st Test at Sydney Cricket Ground – England won by 9 wickets
- 2nd Test at Melbourne Cricket Ground – Australia won by an innings and 55 runs
- 3rd Test at Adelaide Oval – Australia won by an innings and 13 runs
- 4th Test at Melbourne Cricket Ground – Australia won by 8 wickets
- 5th Test at Sydney Cricket Ground – Australia won by 6 wickets

For information about this tour, see : English cricket team in Australia in 1897–98

=== New Zealand 1898–99 ===
The New Zealand cricket team made its inaugural tour of Australia in the 1898–99 season, playing two first-class matches in February.

For information about this tour, see : New Zealand cricket team in Australia in 1898–99

== External sources ==
- CricketArchive — itinerary of Australian cricket
