= Jack Edwards (cricketer, born 1860) =

Australian cricketer

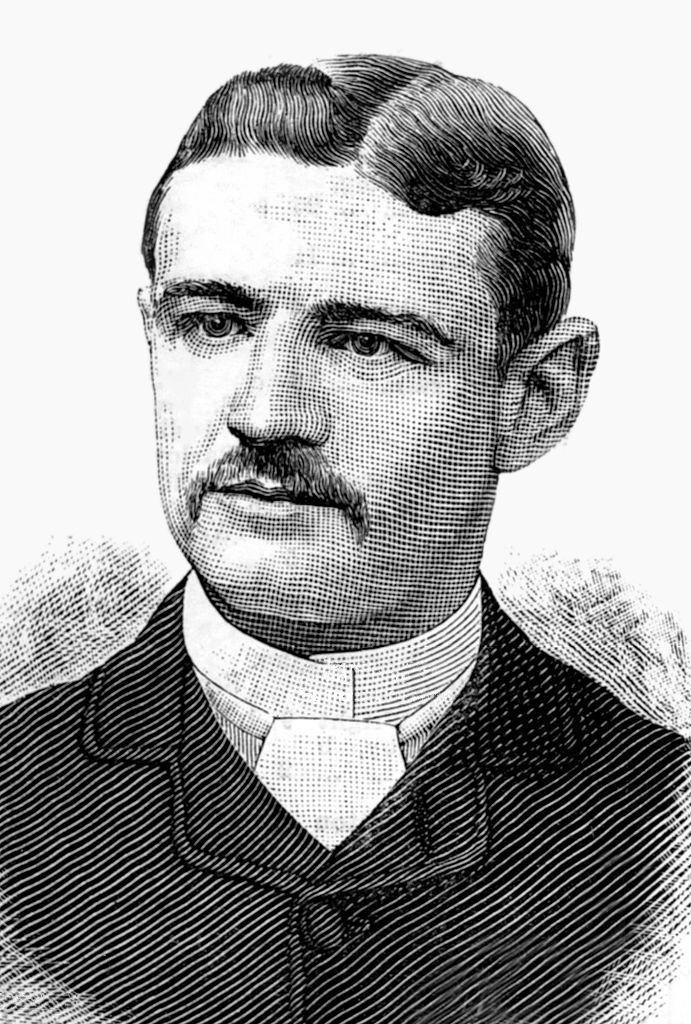

Personal information
- Full name: John Dunlop Edwards
- Born: 12 June 1860; Prahran, Victoria
- Died: 31 July 1911 (aged 51); Hawksburn, Victoria
- Batting: Right-handed
- Bowling: Legbreak

International information
- National side: Australia
- Test debut (cap 52): 16 July 1888 v England
- Last Test: 30 August 1888 v England

Domestic team information
- Years: Team
- Melbourne Cricket Club

Career statistics
Competition	Tests	First-class
Matches	3	51
Runs scored	48	961
Batting average	9.60	13.72
100s/50s	0/0	0/4
Top score	26	65
Balls bowled	0	493
Wickets	0	7
Bowling average	–	27.71
5 wickets in innings	0	0
10 wickets in match	0	0
Best bowling	–	2/6
Catches/stumpings	1/0	19/0
- Source: CricketArchive, 14 December 2014

John Dunlop Edwards (12 June 1860 – 31 July 1911) was an Australian cricketer who played in three Tests in England in 1888.

A short and slight man, Edwards attended Wesley College and played for Melbourne Cricket Club before making his first-class debut for Victoria in 1880–81. He hit his highest score the following summer (65 against the touring English team) before he was transferred to Bendigo in his job as a bank clerk.

Edwards had a strong defence and was a fine fieldsman. His selection for the tour of England in 1888 was prompted by his heavy scoring in club matches. In the three Test matches on the tour he made three ducks in six innings, achieving an average of 9.60, batting in the middle order in all three matches. Edwards did only a little better in first-class cricket overall, playing in 51 matches and scoring 961 runs at an average of 13.72.

He died after illness compounded by a nervous breakdown.

== See also ==
- List of Victoria first-class cricketers
