= 1891 English cricket season =

Cricket season review

The 1891 English cricket season featured the second edition of the County Championship. There were no international tours. The County Championship was won by Surrey in even more dominant fashion than previously as they won twelve of their 16 games. Debutants Somerset finished fifth out of the nine teams. (Note: Any match listed in the ACS' Important Match Guide (1981) is historically important, and therefore of the highest standard, whether or not a scorecard might exist. The same applies to numerous matches discovered by researchers since 1981. For further information, see First-class cricket.)

== Honours ==
- County Championship - Surrey
- Wisden (Five Great Bowlers) - William Attewell, J T Hearne, Frederick Martin, Arthur Mold, John Sharpe

== County Championship ==
=== Final table ===
	Team	P	W	L	D	A	Pts
1	Surrey	16	12	2	2	0	10
2	Lancashire	16	8	4	3	1	4
3	Middlesex	16	8	5	3	0	3
4	Nottinghamshire	14	5	4	5	0	1
5	Kent	16	4	5	6	1	-1
5	Somerset	12	5	6	1	0	-1
7	Sussex	14	4	7	3	0	-3
8	Yorkshire	16	5	10	1	0	-5
9	Gloucestershire	16	2	10	4	0	-8

Points system:

- 1 for a win
- 0 for a draw
- −1 for a loss

=== Most runs in the County Championship ===
1891 County Championship - leading batsmen
Name	Team	Matches	Runs	Average	100s	50s
Bobby Abel	Surrey	16	916	43.61	2	4
Arthur Shrewsbury	Nottinghamshire	13	794	41.78	2	5
Billy Gunn	Nottinghamshire	12	780	43.33	2	3
George Bean	Sussex	14	773	33.60	2	4
Tim O'Brien	Middlesex	15	755	35.95	2	3

=== Most wickets in the County Championship ===
1891 County Championship - leading bowlers
Name	Team	Matches	Balls bowled	Wickets taken	Average
George Lohmann	Surrey	16	4267	132	10.65
John Hearne	Middlesex	15	3434	118	10.33
Arthur Mold	Lancashire	15	3781	112	12.37
Frederick Martin	Kent	15	4267	98	13.10
Johnny Briggs	Lancashire	15	3214	89	12.96

== Overall first-class statistics ==
=== Leading batsmen ===
1891 English cricket season - leading batsmen
Name	Team(s)	Matches	Runs	Average	100s	50s
Billy Gunn	Marylebone Cricket Club (MCC), North of England, Nottinghamshire, Players	23	1336	41.75	4	4
Bobby Abel	Players, South of England, Surrey	24	1139	33.50	2	5
Arthur Shrewsbury	North of England, Nottinghamshire, Players	17	1071	48.68	3	6
George Ulyett	North of England, Players, Yorkshire	25	1068	24.83	2	6
George Bean	Marylebone Cricket Club (MCC), Players, South of England, Sussex	21	1002	30.36	2	5

=== Leading bowlers ===
1891 English cricket season - leading bowlers
Name	Team(s)	Matches	Balls bowled	Wickets taken	Average
George Lohmann	Players, South of England, Surrey	25	5943	177	11.66
Frederick Martin	Kent, Marylebone Cricket Club (MCC), Players, South of England	22	5735	140	13.37
William Attewell	Marylebone Cricket Club (MCC), North of England, Nottinghamshire, Players	28	7573	153	13.93
Arthur Mold	Lancashire	19	4712	138	12.49
Sammy Woods	Cambridge University, Gentlemen, Somerset, South of England	21	4640	134	16.72

== Bibliography ==
- ACS (1981). A Guide to Important Cricket Matches Played in the British Isles 1709–1863. Nottingham: ACS. OCLC 85045528.
- ACS (1982). A Guide to First-class Cricket Matches Played in the British Isles. Nottingham: ACS. OCLC 10586869.
- Warner, Pelham (1946). Lords: 1787–1945. London: Harrap. OCLC 877106024.

== Annual reviews ==
- James Lillywhite's Cricketers' Annual (Red Lilly), Lillywhite, 1892
- Wisden Cricketers' Almanack, 1892
