= Charlie McLeod =

Australian cricketer

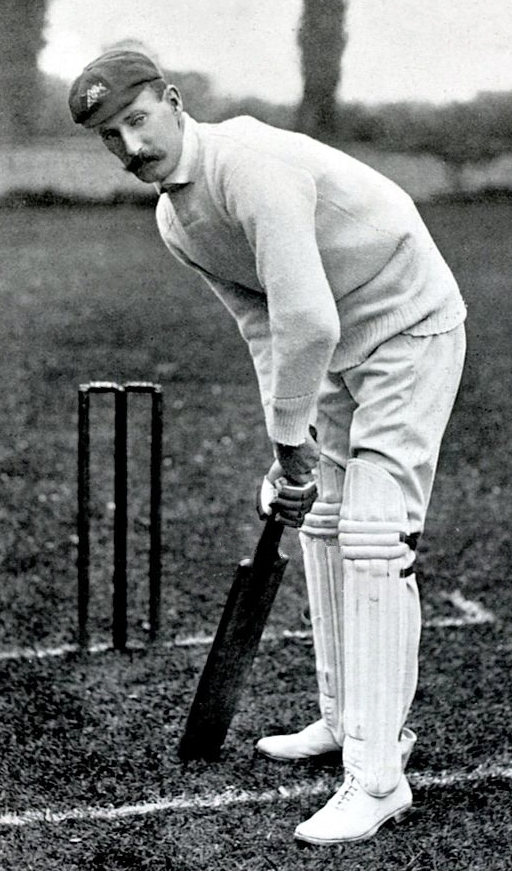
- Charlie McLeod in c. 1900

Personal information
- Full name: Charles Edward McLeod
- Born: 24 October 1869; Sandridge, Victoria, Australia
- Died: 26 November 1918 (aged 49); Toorak, Victoria, Australia
- Batting: Right-handed
- Bowling: Right-arm medium
- Relatives: Bob McLeod (brother); Daniel McLeod (brother)

International information
- National side: Australia
- Test debut (cap 67): 14 December 1894 v England
- Last Test: 14 August 1905 v England

Career statistics
Competition	Test	First-class
Matches	17	114
Runs scored	573	3,321
Batting average	23.87	21.28
100s/50s	1/4	2/17
Top score	112	112
Balls bowled	3374	20,150
Wickets	33	335
Bowling average	40.15	24.25
5 wickets in innings	2	22
10 wickets in match	0	4
Best bowling	5/65	7/34
Catches/stumpings	9/–	62/–
- Source: Cricinfo, 26 May 2018

Charles Edward McLeod (24 October 1869 – 26 November 1918) was an Australian cricketer who played in 17 Test matches between 1894 and 1905.

McLeod was a patient batsman and accurate bowler who represented Victoria in first-class cricket from 1893 to 1905. His fielding and his running between wickets were affected by deafness. In the First Test of the 1897–98 Ashes series he was bowled by a no-ball, and having not heard the umpire's call, he left the wicket, thinking he was out, and was run out by the wicket-keeper, Bill Storer.

His best Test series was the 1897–98 Ashes series, when he scored 352 runs at an average of 58.66. Opening the batting in the Second Test on New Year's Day 1898, he scored his only Test century, 112 in 245 minutes, the only century of the match, which Australia won by an innings. He toured England in 1899 and 1905.

His brother Bob also played Test cricket for Australia.
