= Thomas Miller (cricketer) =

English cricketer

Personal information
- Full name: Thomas Miller
- Born: 8 March 1883; Mindelo, São Vicente, Cape Verde
- Died: 20 October 1962 (aged 79); Goring-on-Thames, Oxfordshire, England
- Batting: Right-handed
- Bowling: Right-arm fast
- Relatives: Audley Miller (uncle)

Domestic team information
- Years: Team
- 1902–1914: Gloucestershire

Career statistics
Competition	First-class
Matches	18
Runs scored	406
Batting average	13.09
100s/50s	–/–
Top score	35
Balls bowled	385
Wickets	4
Bowling average	63.25
5 wickets in innings	–
10 wickets in match	–
Best bowling	2/5
Catches/stumpings	8/–
- Source: Cricinfo, 23 January 2013

Thomas Miller (8 March 1883 – 20 October 1962) was an English cricketer. Miller was a right-handed batsman who bowled right-arm fast. He was born at Mindelo in the Cape Verde Islands.

Educated at Clifton College, Miller made his first-class debut for Gloucestershire against Middlesex at Lord's in the 1902 County Championship. His next first-class appearance came in the 1910 County Championship against Somerset. He made sixteen further first-class appearances for Gloucestershire, the last of which came against Sussex in the 1914 County Championship. In his total of eighteen first-class matches, he scored 406 runs at an average of 13.09, with a high score of 35. With the ball, he took 4 wickets at a bowling average of 63.25, with best figures of 2/5.

He died at Goring-on-Thames, Oxfordshire on 20 October 1962. His uncle Audley Miller played Test cricket for England.
