= William T. Solomon =

American businessman

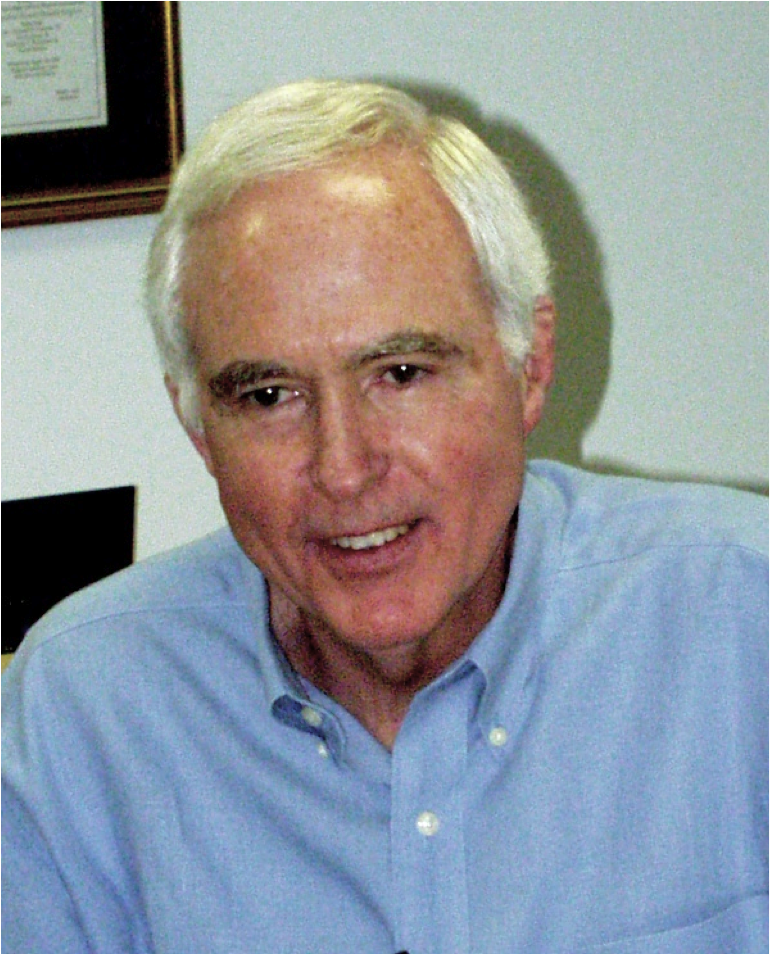
- Education: Southern Methodist University, BS; Harvard Business School, MBA
- Known for: CEO, Austin Industries; Former Chairman, Southwestern Medical Foundation

Bill Solomon is the former president, CEO and chairman of Austin Industries. Solomon is also the former chairman of Southwestern Medical Foundation in Dallas, Texas, where he presided for six years, from May 2008 until May 2014.

== Early life and education ==
Solomon was born and raised in Dallas, Texas. He received his B.S. degree in civil engineering from Southern Methodist University and his M.B.A. from Harvard Business School where he was a Baker Scholar.

== Austin Industries ==
Bill Solomon became president and CEO of Austin Industries in 1970, a position he held for 31 years until 2001. He was elected chairman of the board in 1987 and held that position until his retirement in 2008.

During that time, Austin Industries grew to become one of the nation's leading commercial, industrial, and infrastructure construction companies in the United States. Sales multiplied by a factor of 25 and grew to more than $1 billion.

== Business and community involvement ==
Along with being former chairman of the Southwestern Medical Foundation, Solomon is chairman of the Hoblitzelle Foundation and vice-chairman of Dallas Medical Resource. He is also a member of the O'Donnell Foundation Board and the World Presidents' Organization.

Previously, Solomon served as chairman of Dallas Citizens Council, Northaven United Methodist Church, Dallas Together Forum, Greater Dallas Chamber, Coalition for Better Transportation, and SMU School of Engineering. He was also on the board of Belo Corp, Baylor University Medical Center Foundation, SMU board of trustees and Fidelity Union Life Insurance Co.

Solomon and his wife, Gay, endowed the “William T. and Gay F. Solomon Division of General Internal Medicine” at the University of Texas Southwestern Medical Center in Dallas, Texas with a $10 million gift in 2003.

Notable awards include the Linz Award, UT Southwestern's Sprague Community Service Award, the J. Erik Jonsson Ethics Award and the Dedman Lifetime Achievement Award for Philanthropy. He is also a member of the Texas Business Hall of Fame. In 2007 he was awarded an Honorary Doctorate of Humane Letters from SMU and in 1988 was recognized as a Distinguished Alumnus.
