= William Solomon (cricketer) =

South African cricketer (1872–1964)

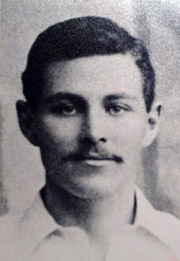

Personal information
- Born: 23 April 1872; Fort Beaufort, Cape Colony
- Died: 12 July 1964 (aged 92); Cradock, Cape Province, South Africa
- Batting: Right-handed
- Bowling: Right-arm

International information
- National side: South Africa
- Only Test (cap 43): 14 February 1899 v England

Domestic team information
- Years: Team
- 1892–93 to 1898–99: Transvaal
- 1905–06: Eastern Province

Career statistics
Competition	Tests	First-class
Matches	1	5
Runs scored	4	73
Batting average	2.00	9.12
100s/50s	0/0	0/1
Top score	2	52
Balls bowled	–	18
Wickets	–	1
Bowling average	–	6.00
5 wickets in innings	–	0
10 wickets in match	–	0
Best bowling	–	1/6
Catches/stumpings	1/-	5/-
- Source: CricketArchive

William Rodger Thomson Solomon (23 April 1872 in Fort Beaufort, Cape Colony – 12 July 1964 in Cradock, Eastern Cape) was a Cape Colony cricketer who played in one Test in 1899.

Solomon was selected in South Africa's side for the First Test after scoring two courageous fifties against the touring English team in February 1899. Until Norman Giddy scored 66 for Border in the seventh match of the tour no batsman had reached 50 against the English side. Then Solomon scored 64 for a Johannesburg XV and 52 for Transvaal. He was unable to continue this success into the Test series, however, and after making 2 in each innings he was not selected again.

Preceded by Audley Miller	Oldest Living Test Cricketer; 26 June 1959 – 12 July 1964	Succeeded by Sydney Barnes
