= Michael Pearce =

Michael Pearce may refer to:

- Michael Pearce (author) (1933–2022), Anglo-Egyptian Sudan author
- Michael Pearce (artist) (born 1965), British, California-based artist
- Mickey Pearce, character in Only Fools and Horses

== See also ==
- Mike Pearse, cartoonist
- Mike Pierce (born 1980), American mixed martial arts fighter
- Mick Pearce (born 1938), Zimbabwean architect
