= John Pentecost (cricketer) =

English cricketer

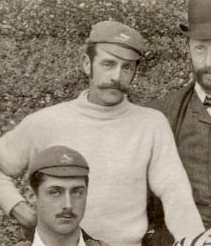
- Pentecost in 1888

Personal information
- Full name: John Henry Pentecost
- Born: 1857; Brighton, Sussex
- Died: 23 February 1902 (aged 44); St John's Wood, London
- Batting: Right-handed
- Role: Wicket-keeper

Domestic team information
- Years: Team
- 1882–1890: Kent
- FC debut: 12 June 1882 Kent v Yorkshire
- Last FC: 10 July 1890 Kent v Nottinghamshire

Career statistics
Competition	First-class
Matches	66
Runs scored	572
Batting average	7.52
100s/50s	0/0
Top score	38
Balls bowled	28
Wickets	1
Bowling average	28.00
5 wickets in innings	0
10 wickets in match	0
Best bowling	1/19
Catches/stumpings	95/32
- Source: CricInfo, 11 November 2018

John Henry Pentecost (15 October 1857 – 23 February 1902) was an English professional cricketer who played for Kent County Cricket Club between 1882 and 1890.

Pentecost was born at Brighton in 1857 (Note: CricketArchive gives Pentecost's date of birth as 15 October 1855, his place of birth as Deptford and his place of death as Hampstead. CricInfo gives his date of birth as 15 October 1857, his place of birth as Brighton and his place of death as St John's Wood. The last detail matches his Wisden obituary, although his age at death is given as 42 in his obituary. The details from CricInfo have been preferred as the place of death matches that given in Wisden.) and made his Kent debut in 1882 against Yorkshire at Bramall Lane, Sheffield. He played primarily as a wicket-keeper, making 63 of his 66 first-class cricket appearances for the county, making 124 dismissals. Writing in Wisden in 1907 George Marsham described him as "not a very brilliant wicket-keeper" but "a very plucky one" and Pentecost was forced to stop playing earlier than would have been normal due to "failing eyesight".

After being awarded his county cap in 1885, Pentecost was awarded a benefit match in 1892 and was a member of the ground staff at Lord's. He died at St John's Wood in London in February 1902 aged 44.

== Bibliography ==
- Carlaw, Derek (2020). Kent County Cricketers, A to Z: Part One (1806–1914) (PDF). Cardiff: ACS.
