= Joseph Tardif =

Australian cricketer

Personal information
- Born: 17 May 1860; Adelaide, Australia
- Died: 14 June 1920 (aged 60)
- Source: Cricinfo, 28 September 2020

Joseph Tardif (17 May 1860 – 14 June 1920) was an Australian cricketer. He played in four first-class matches for South Australia from 1889 to 1893.

== See also ==
- List of South Australian representative cricketers
