= J. W. Hobbs' Ground =

Cricket ground in Norbury, Surrey, England

Coordinates: 51.41203°N 0.11402°W

- Barclays Bank Ground

Ground information
- Location: Norbury, Surrey
- Establishment: 1887

Team information
C. I. Thornton's XI	(1888)
- As of 29 August 2010; Source: Ground profile

J. W. Hobbs' Ground was a cricket ground in Norbury, Surrey. The ground was constructed in 1885 within the grounds of Norbury Hall by local philanthropist J. W. Hobbs.

The first recorded match on the ground was in 1887, when C. I. Thornton's XI played the Gentlemen of Canada. It hosted its only first-class match in the following year, when C. I. Thornton's XI played the touring Australians.

Additionally, between 1982 and 1984, the ground played host to 3 Surrey Second XI matches in the Second XI Championship. The ground has also hosted 7 Second XI Trophy matches played by the Marylebone Cricket Club Young Cricketers from 1991 to 1992.

The ground itself was sold to the South West Bank in 1911, who were taken over by Barclays Bank; cricket was played to a high quality at the ground through to the 1980s. In the 1990s, Barclays sold the ground to a private company who built a leisure centre on the ground, bringing to an end a century's worth of cricket at the venue.
