= George Bonnor =

Australian cricketer (1855–1912)

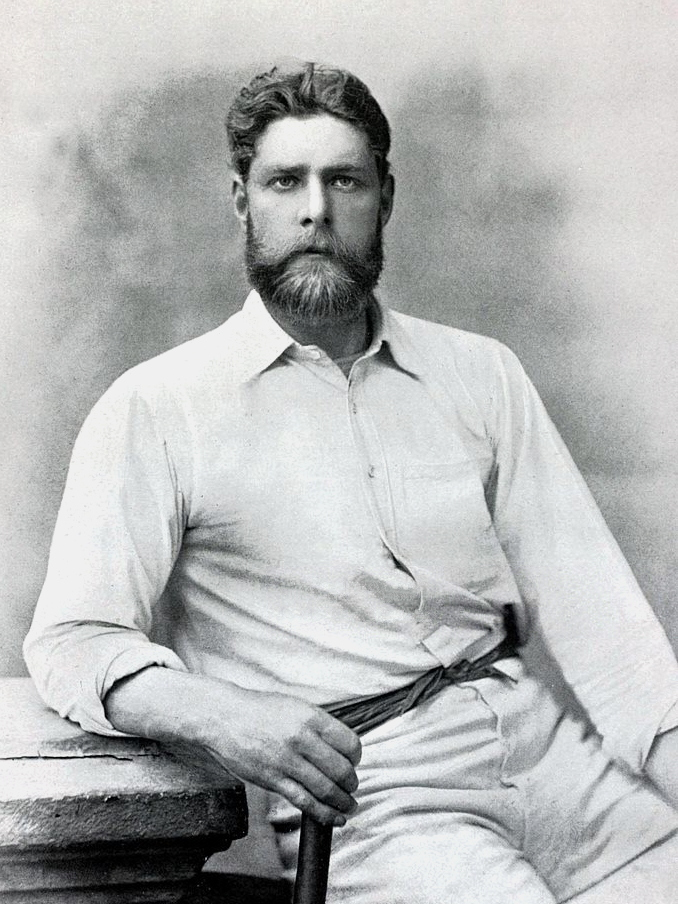

Personal information
- Born: 25 February 1855; Bathurst, New South Wales, Australia
- Died: 27 June 1912 (aged 57); Orange, New South Wales, Australia
- Batting: Right-handed
- Bowling: Right-arm medium

International information
- National side: Australia
- Test debut (cap 19): 6 September 1880 v England
- Last Test: 30 August 1888 v England

Career statistics
Competition	Test	First-class
Matches	17	148
Runs scored	512	4,820
Batting average	17.06	21.23
100s/50s	1/2	5/18
Top score	128	128
Balls bowled	164	852
Wickets	2	12
Bowling average	42.00	39.16
5 wickets in innings	0	0
10 wickets in match	0	0
Best bowling	1/5	3/34
Catches/stumpings	16/–	128/1
- Source: Cricinfo, 12 October 2022

George John Bonnor (25 February 1855 – 27 June 1912) was an Australian cricketer, known for his big hitting, who played Test cricket between 1880 and 1888.

== Career ==
Bonnor was born in Bathurst, New South Wales, and made his international debut in the first match played in England in 1880. Being very tall for the 19th century at 6 foot 6 inches he was also exceedingly strong and made the most of it with some powerful hitting, however at times his cavalier attitude led to some periods of poor scores as well.

Two anecdotes testify to his enormous strength. First, during the Oval Test match of 1880 between England and Australia, he was out caught for two to a ball he had hit so high that by the time GF Grace had snaffled him, waiting directly underneath it on the boundary, he and his partner had almost completed their third run. "My heart stopped beating as I went on waiting [for the ball to come]," said Grace later.

On the next tour, in 1882, Bonnor made a £100 wager with a disbelieving fellow passenger on the SS Assam that he could, with his throw after stepping off the ship, send a cricket ball 100 yards: he won the wager by throwing the ball 119 yards and seven inches, done without a run up. WG Grace credits Bonnor with another throw of 130 yards, but legend has it that Grace himself threw even further in their one-on-one competition.

Measured hits of his in practice included ones at Melbourne of 160 and 149 yards, and one of 147 at Mitcham Common in May 1880, which was carefully measured by the famed bowler James Southerton. Bonnor also reached 160 yards in actual play when, at Longsight in 1880, the Australians played the local XVIII and he sent Grace's cousin, W.R. Gilbert, a long way.

In 1884, George Bonnor became the first player in Test cricket as well as international cricket history, to be dismissed hit wicket.

Bonnor died of a heart attack, aged 57, in Orange, New South Wales, and is buried at the cemetery there.
