= Harry Donnan =

Australian cricketer

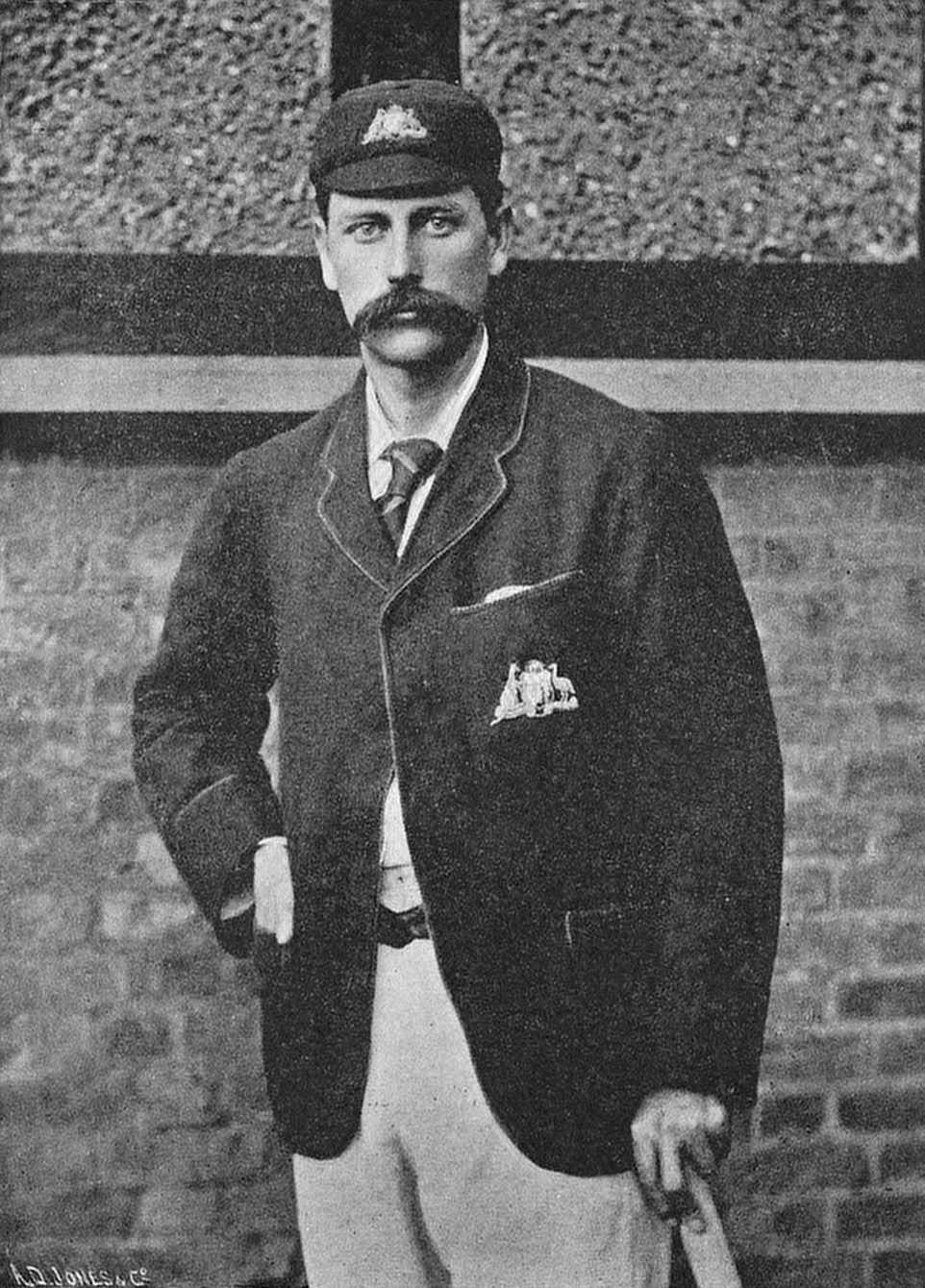
- Harry Donnan

Personal information
- Born: 12 November 1864; Liverpool, New South Wales, Australia
- Died: 13 August 1956 (aged 91); Bexley, New South Wales, Australia
- Batting: Right-handed
- Bowling: Right-arm medium-pace

International information
- National side: Australia
- Test debut (cap 61): 1 January 1892 v England
- Last Test: 10 August 1896 v England

Domestic team information
- Years: Team
- 1887–88 to 1900–01: New South Wales

Career statistics
| Competition | Tests | First-class |
|---|---|---|
| Matches | 5 | 94 |
| Runs scored | 75 | 4262 |
| Batting average | 8.33 | 29.19 |
| 100s/50s | 0/0 | 6/22 |
| Top score | 15 | 167 |
| Balls bowled | 54 | 3081 |
| Wickets | 0 | 29 |
| Bowling average | – | 41.06 |
| 5 wickets in innings | 0 | 0 |
| 10 wickets in match | 0 | 0 |
| Best bowling | – | 3/14 |
| Catches/stumpings | 1/0 | 37/0 |
- Source: Cricinfo

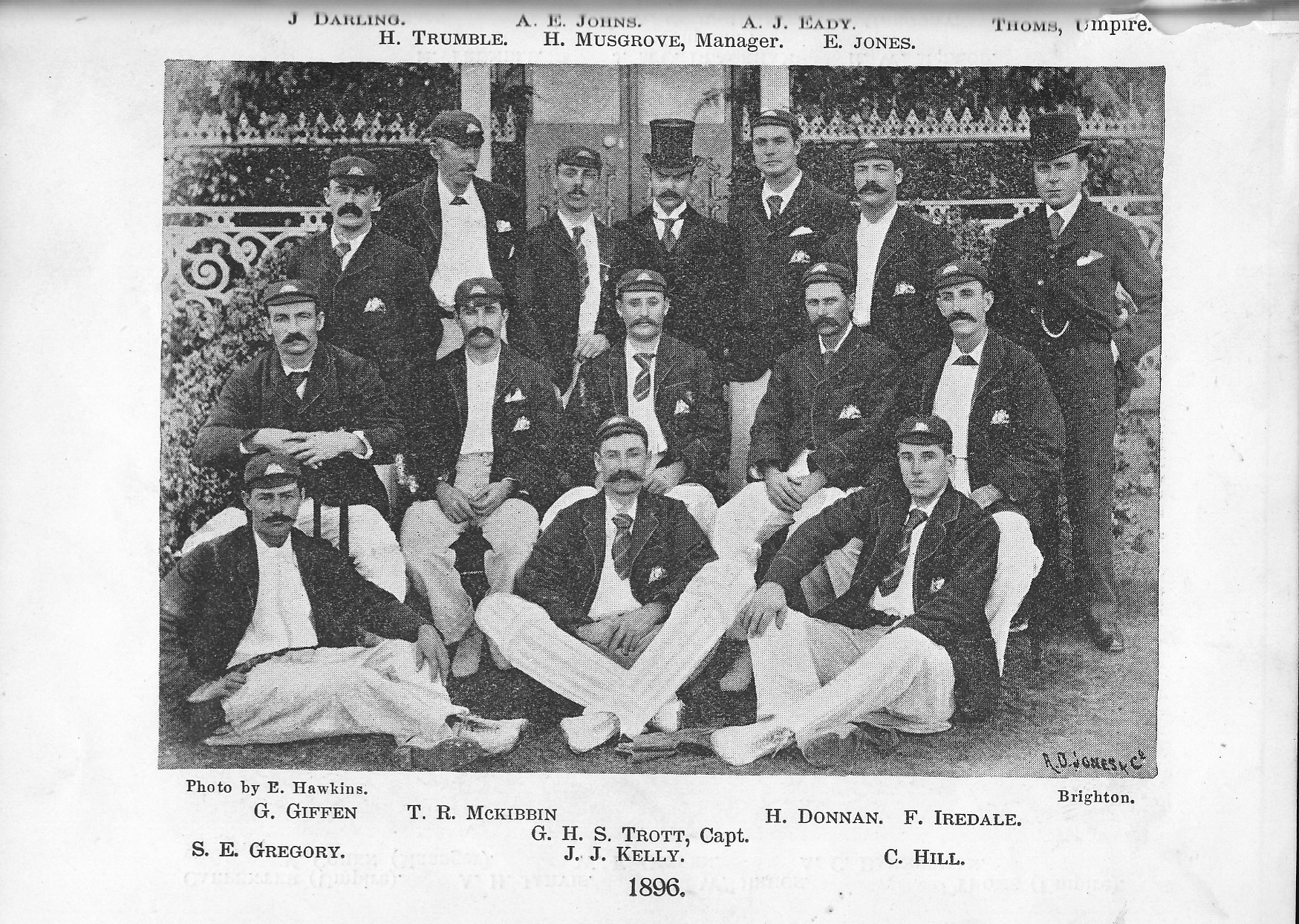
Donnan pictured middle row 2nd right with the 1896 Australia national cricket team

Henry Donnan (12 November 1864 – 13 August 1956) was an Australian cricketer who played in 5 Tests between 1892 and 1896.

Donnan scored the first century in the Sheffield Shield when he made 120 for New South Wales against South Australia in the first Shield match in 1892–93.

Donnan worked for the Colonial Sugar Refining Company for 42 years until he retired in 1923.

== See also ==
- List of New South Wales representative cricketers

| Preceded by Kenny Burn | Oldest Living Test Cricketer; 20 July 1956 – 13 August 1956 | Succeeded by Audley Miller |
