= Frank Iredale =

Australian cricketer

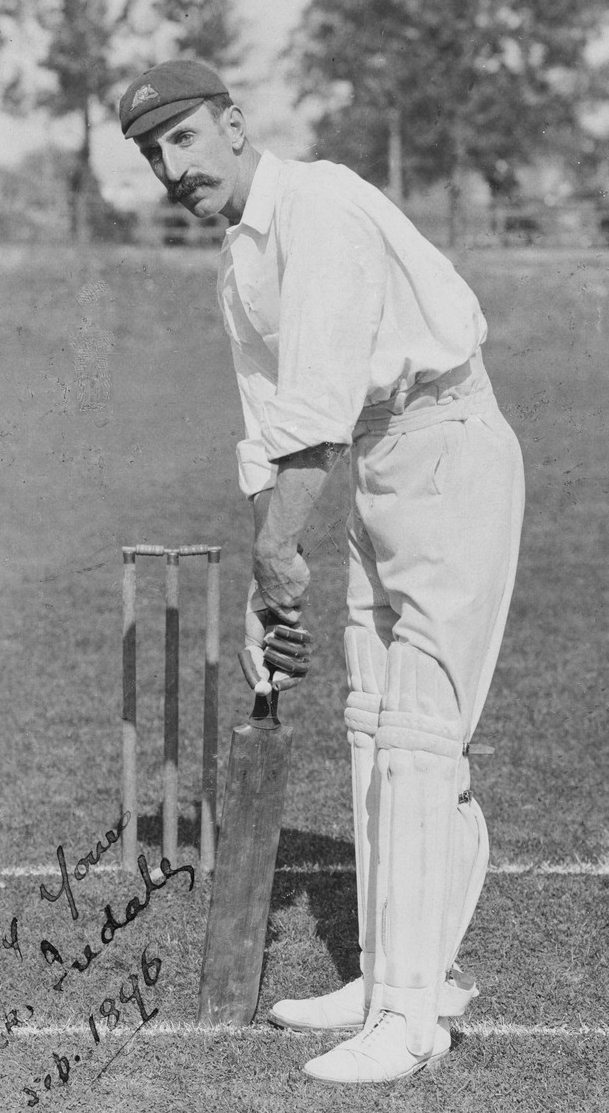
- Iredale in 1896

Personal information
- Born: 19 June 1867; Surry Hills, New South Wales, Australia
- Died: 15 April 1926 (aged 58); Crows Nest, New South Wales, Australia
- Batting: Right-handed

International information
- National side: Australia
- Test debut (cap 65): 14 December 1894 v England
- Last Test: 14 August 1899 v England

Career statistics
Competition	Test	First-class
Matches	14	133
Runs scored	807	6,795
Batting average	36.68	33.63
100s/50s	2/4	12/36
Top score	140	196
Balls bowled	12	482
Wickets	0	6
Bowling average	–	35.16
5 wickets in innings	–	0
10 wickets in match	–	0
Best bowling	–	3/1
Catches/stumpings	16/–	111/–
- Source: CricketArchive, 12 October 2022

Francis Adams Iredale (19 June 1867 – 15 April 1926) was an Australian cricketer who played 14 Test matches between 1888 and 1902.

== Early life ==
Frank Iredale was born to Thomas Richardson and Margaret Iredale (nee Adams) on 19 June 1867 at the family home in Bourke Street, Surry Hills, Sydney. His parents were married in 1862.

== First-class career ==
Iredale, after some good performances with bat and ball for the Albert club in the local Sydney competition, debuted at the end of 1888 for New South Wales in a match against a selection known as an Australian XI. In his only innings for the match Frank scored 13, and in the combined side's second innings, when given his first chance as a bowler, sent down 15 unsuccessful overs for 41 runs.

Iredale wasn't chosen again for more than a year, and not regularly chosen in the NSW team until the 1892-93 season. His first century in first-class cricket came at the MCG in late December 1892 during the match against Victoria, scoring 101 in about 265 minutes. A steady innings, 'Felix' in The Australasian, noted that it was "marked by ease and confidence for the most part, and his style won praise from all."

== Test career ==
Frank Iredale debuted for Australia in an Ashes match against England in late 1894. His fine innings of 81, and contribution to a rescuing partnership with George Giffen was mentioned in reminiscence soon after his death in 1926.

== Retirement and later life ==
After his retirement from the playing field, Iredale continued to serve the Australian cricketing community, acting as a national selector and, after 1922, as Secretary of the New South Wales Cricket Association. He was forced by a period of ill-health to resign from that position in early 1926.

He died, aged 58, just a few weeks later on 15 April.
