= Michael Pierce (cricketer) =

Australian cricketer (1869–1913)

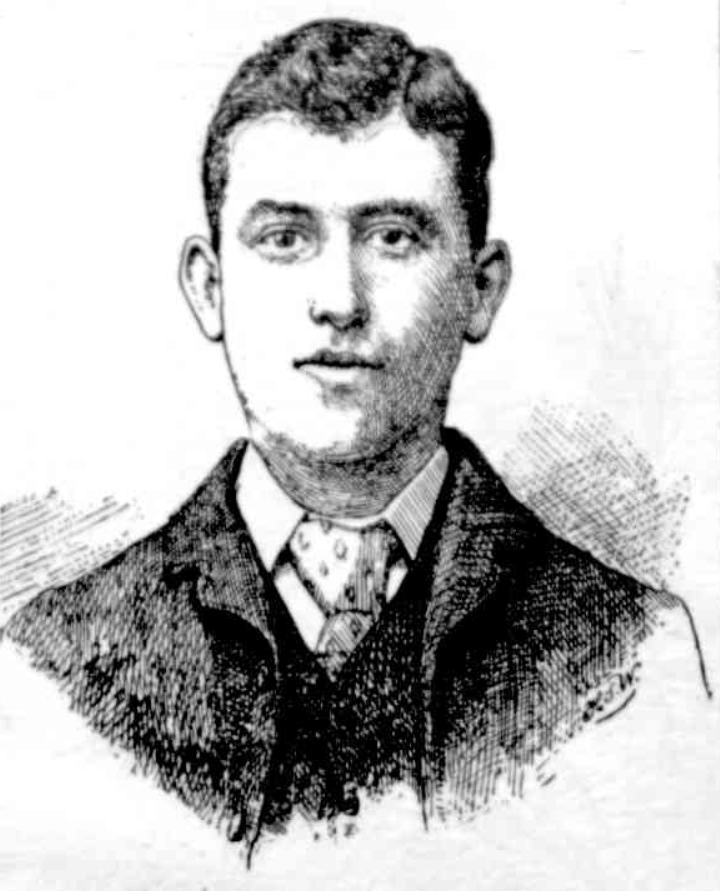

Personal information
- Born: 3 September 1869; Sydney, Australia
- Died: 4 February 1913 (aged 43); Sydney, Australia
- Bowling: Right-arm leg-spin
- Role: Bowler

Domestic team information
- Years: Team
- 1892–93 to 1893–94: New South Wales
- 1894–95: Queensland

Career statistics
Competition	First-class
Matches	8
Runs scored	87
Batting average	8.70
100s/50s	0/0
Top score	32
Balls bowled	1,658
Wickets	30
Bowling average	27.93
5 wickets in innings	3
10 wickets in match	1
Best bowling	8/111
Catches/stumpings	7/–
- Source: ESPNcricinfo, 24 October 2019

Michael Pierce (3 September 1869 – 4 February 1913) was an Australian cricketer. He played eight first-class matches for New South Wales and Queensland between 1892/93 and 1894/95.

Short, thick-set and muscular, Mick Pierce was a slow leg-break bowler who could spin the ball sharply even on the hardest pitch. On his first-class debut in December 1892, which was also the first-ever Sheffield Shield match, Pierce opened the bowling for New South Wales and took 8 for 111 and 5 for 154, but South Australia nevertheless won by 57 runs. A week later, in the second Sheffield Shield match, he took 6 for 100 and 1 for 63 against Victoria, but again he was on the losing side. Despite this brilliant beginning to his career he quickly faded from the first-class scene, apparently through lack of ambition.

Pierce died in February 1913 after a long illness.
