= Bob McLeod (cricketer) =

Australian cricketer

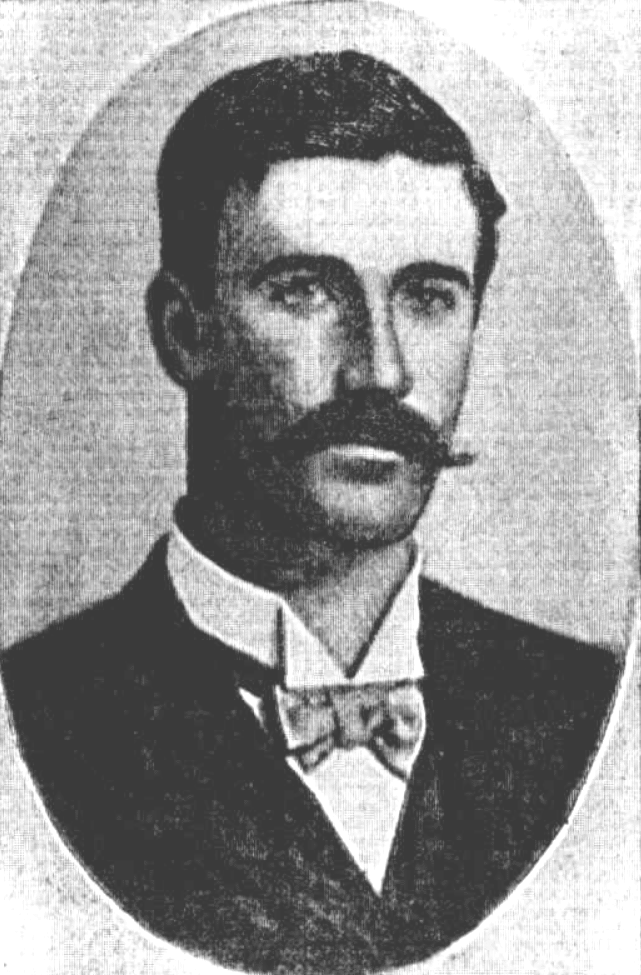

Personal information
- Born: 19 January 1868
- Died: 15 June 1907 (aged 39)
- Batting: Left-handed
- Bowling: Right-arm medium

International information
- National side: Australia
- Test debut (cap 62): 1 January 1892 v England
- Last Test: 24 August 1893 v England

Career statistics
Competition	Test	First-class
Matches	6	57
Runs scored	146	1,701
Batting average	13.27	22.38
100s/50s	0/0	1/6
Top score	31	101
Balls bowled	1,089	9,281
Wickets	12	141
Bowling average	31.83	22.72
5 wickets in innings	1	7
10 wickets in match	0	2
Best bowling	5/53	7/24
Catches/stumpings	3/–	39/–
- Source: Cricinfo, 13 October 2022

Robert William McLeod (19 January 1868 – 15 June 1907) was an Australian cricketer who played in six Test matches in 1892 and 1893. On his debut, he took five wickets in the first innings against England in Melbourne in 1892.

== Biography ==
McLeod was born in Port Melbourne, Victoria. After retiring as a player he continued to be involved as a selector, team manager, committeeman and delegate to the Victorian Cricket Association. In 1907 he replaced H. C. A. Harrison as the Melbourne Cricket Club representative on the Victorian Football League. He died on 15 June 1907 in Middle Park, Victoria. His brother, Charlie, also played cricket for Australia.
