= Charles Thornton (cricketer) =

English cricketer (1850–1929)

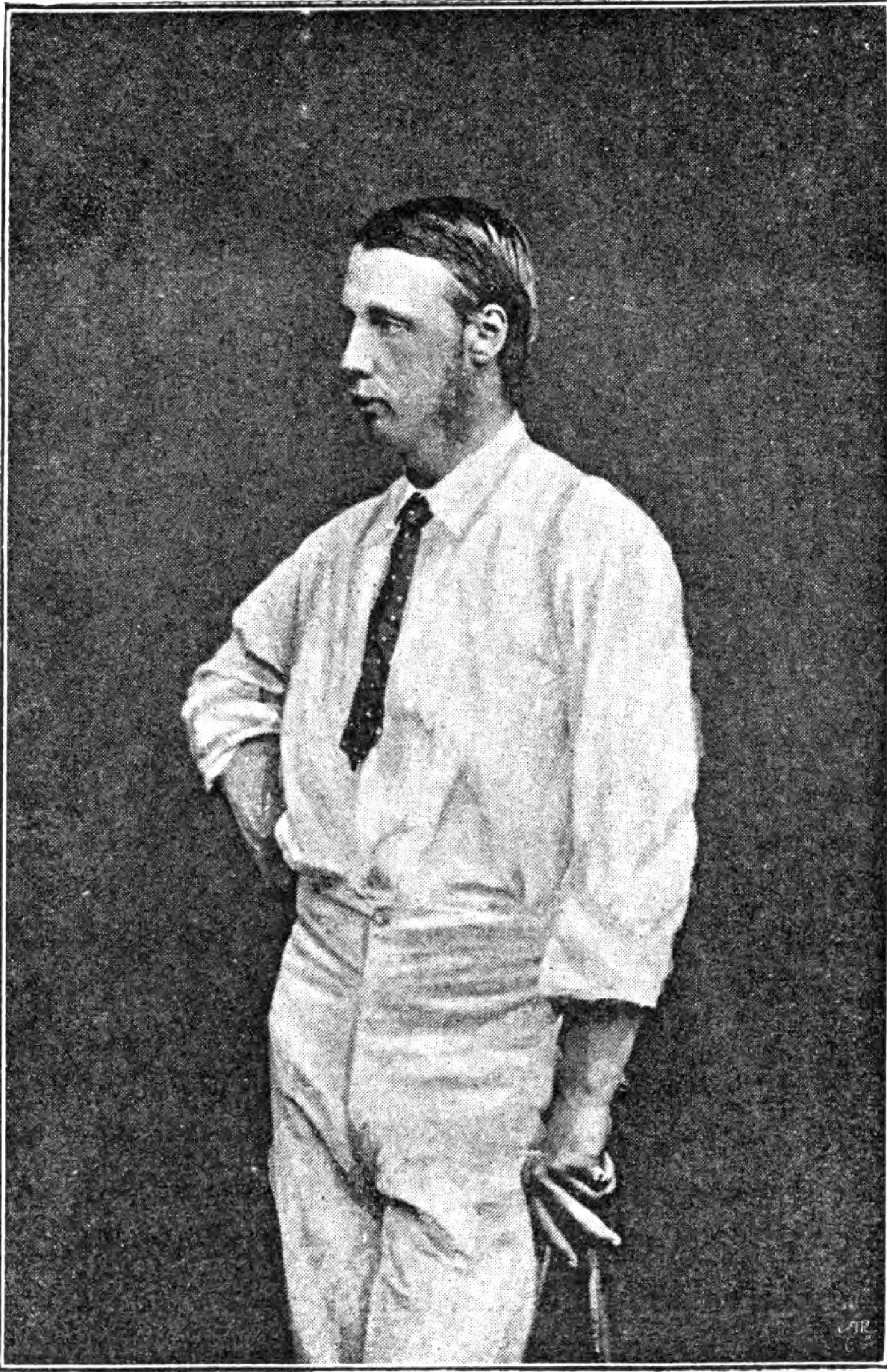
- Thornton pictured in a book published in 1893

Personal information
- Full name: Charles Inglis Thornton
- Born: 20 March 1850; Llanwarne, Herefordshire, England
- Died: 10 December 1929 (aged 79); Marylebone, London, England
- Nickname: Buns
- Batting: Right-handed
- Bowling: Right-arm fast
- Relatives: Percy Thornton (cousin)

Domestic team information
- Years: Team
- 1867–1872: Kent
- 1869–1872: Cambridge University
- 1869–1895: Marylebone Cricket Club (MCC)
- 1875–1885: Middlesex

Career statistics
Competition	First-class
Matches	217
Runs scored	6,928
Batting average	19.35
100s/50s	5/20
Top score	124
Balls bowled	2,423
Wickets	47
Bowling average	20.10
5 wickets in innings	0
10 wickets in match	0
Best bowling	4/19
Catches/stumpings	119/–
- Source: Cricinfo, 24 January 2023

Charles Inglis Thornton (20 March 1850 – 10 December 1929), nicknamed "Buns", was an English cricketer who played more than 200 first-class matches in the later 19th century, for no fewer than 22 different teams.

He was also the founder of the Scarborough Festival.

== Life ==
Thornton was born at Llanwarne, Herefordshire, the son of Watson Joseph Thornton, Rural Dean of Hereford, and grandson of Henry Thornton. He was orphaned before the age of five. and adopted, along with his brother, by Benjamin Harrison, Archdeacon of Maidstone, at Canterbury. He was educated at Eton and Trinity College, Cambridge. From 1876 he was in the timber trade, at Raffety, Thornton & Co. of Old Broad Street, London.

== Cricket ==
Thornton began to play cricket playing with children in Canterbury in informal single wicket competitions. He played his first organised game at Great Mongeham in 1861, making 22 not out. His cricket career at Eton was slow to win approval. The master in charge of cricket, Fred Bell, did not like his attacking play. Thornton remarked that it was because he hit all the best balls into the trees. He had success in both Eton v Harrow and Oxford v Cambridge matches, then part of the London season. On graduation he was able to rent a hunting box in Oxford with his cousin, hunting three days a week and playing cricket the other four.

He was considered one of the biggest hitters in cricket, with one shot at Hove in 1876 claimed to have exceeded 160 yards. He hit the ball over the pavilion at Lord's in the 1868 Eton v Harrow match. This, however was over the old pavilion. The only person to have struck a ball over the current pavilion (built 1889–90) is A. E. Trott Other claims made by Thornton included a 156-yard hit at Ranelagh, a 152-yard hit at Canterbury and a 136-yard hit at Scarborough, the ball landing in Trafalgar Square (Scarborough).

Thornton was a member of the Orleans Club, which was founded in 1878, and organised its cricket teams. His own private team — C. I. Thornton's XI — played most of their early games at Fenner's, but after his retirement from playing in 1897 their home became Scarborough, where they continued to play first-class cricket until 1929, the year of Thornton's death. He died in 1929 aged 79 at Marylebone in London.

Thornton had some interesting ideas about cricket. He wanted bowlers' run ups limited to 10 yards, and the wearing of leg guards (pads) to be forbidden. The only protection he advocated was football style shin pads.

== Bibliography ==
- Carlaw, Derek (2020). Kent County Cricketers, A to Z: Part One (1806–1914) (PDF). Cardiff: ACS.
