= Jack Lyons (cricketer) =

Australian cricketer

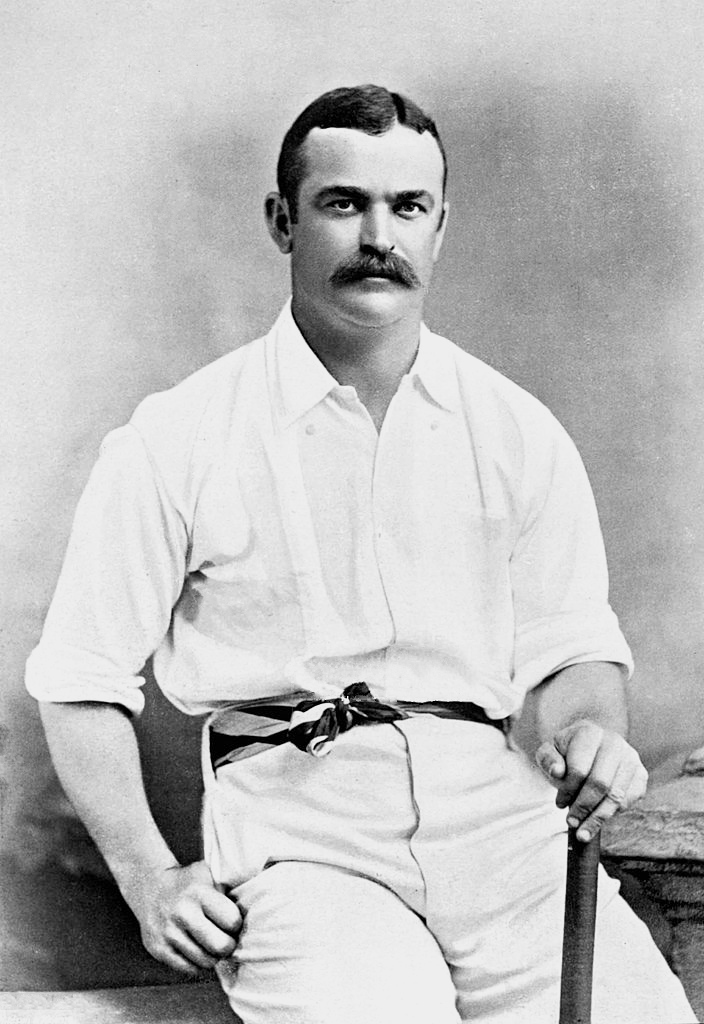

Personal information
- Full name: John James Lyons
- Born: 21 May 1863; Gawler, South Australia
- Died: 21 July 1927 (aged 64); Adelaide, South Australia
- Batting: Right-handed
- Bowling: Right-arm medium

International information
- National side: Australia
- Test debut (cap 51): 25 February 1887 v England
- Last Test: 13 December 1897 v England

Domestic team information
- Years: Team
- 1884/85–1899/2000: South Australia

Career statistics
Competition	Test	First-class
Matches	14	153
Runs scored	731	6,753
Batting average	27.07	25.57
100s/50s	1/3	11/28
Top score	134	149
Balls bowled	316	6,843
Wickets	6	107
Bowling average	24.83	30.14
5 wickets in innings	1	5
10 wickets in match	0	0
Best bowling	5/30	6/38
Catches/stumpings	3/–	60/–
- Source: CricInfo, 29 August 2020

John James Lyons (21 May 1863 – 21 July 1927) was an Australian cricketer who played in 14 Test matches between 1887 and 1897.

== Life and career ==
Born in the South Australian town of Gawler, Lyons was a hard-hitting right-handed batsman whose "quick eye and strong forearms enabled him to hit all around the wicket with a minimum of footwork". He usually opened the innings. He toured England with the Australian teams of 1888, 1890 and 1893.

Lyons was an all-rounder early in his career, and took 5 for 30 in the Lord's Test of 1890 after scoring 55 in the first 45 minutes of the match. In 1893, when the Australians followed on 181 runs behind the Marylebone Cricket Club at Lord's, he scored 149 in 95 minutes in an opening partnership of 181.

Lyons was the highest scorer on either side in the three-match Ashes series of 1891–92, which Australia won 2–1. He made 287 runs at an average of 47.83, and scored his only Test century, 134 in 185 minutes, in the second innings of the Second Test after Australia had trailed by 163 runs; Australia went on to win by 72 runs.

In December 1892, in the inaugural match of the Sheffield Shield, Lyons scored 124 in 117 minutes after South Australia had followed on 125 runs behind New South Wales; South Australia went on to win.

Lyons worked as a stockbroker in Adelaide before joining the South Australian public service where he worked in the Land and Titles Office and the Government Statist's Office. He was awarded a benefit match, the 1925–26 Sheffield Shield match between South Australia and New South Wales at the Adelaide Oval, which brought him £1,252.

Lyons married Annie Morris in April 1897. He died in July 1927 of an "internal complaint" after some months of illness and a final week in hospital. He was survived by his wife and their five children.
