= List of Gloucestershire County Cricket Club players =

This is a list in alphabetical order of cricketers who have played for Gloucestershire County Cricket Club in top-class matches since the club was founded in 1870. Gloucestershire has always had first-class status. It has been a List A team since the beginning of limited overs cricket in 1963; and a top-class Twenty20 team since the inauguration of the Twenty20 Cup in 2003.

The details are the player's usual name followed by the years in which he was active as a Gloucestershire player and then his name is given as it would appear on modern match scorecards. Note that many players represented other top-class teams besides Gloucestershire and some, including the Grace brothers, played for teams styled Gloucestershire before 1870. Current players are shown as active to the latest season in which they played for the club. The list excludes Second XI and other players who did not play for the club's first team; and players whose first team appearances were in minor matches only.

== A ==
- Dennis A'Court (1960–1963): D. G. A'Court
- Stephen Adshead (2004–2009): S. J. Adshead
- Zaman Akhter (2023–2024): Z. Akhter
- Terry Alderman (1988): T. M. Alderman
- Ernest Alderwick (1908): E. E. G. Alderwick
- Basil Allen (1932–1951): B. O. Allen
- Charles Allen (1909): C. Allen
- David Allen (1953–1972): D. A. Allen
- Mark Alleyne (1986–2005): M. W. Alleyne
- Ben Allison (2019): B. M. J. Allison
- Hampden Alpass (1926–1928): H. J. H. Alpass
- Jim Andrew (1959–1966): F. J. Andrew
- Jo Angel (2002): J. Angel
- Anwar Ali (2023): Anwar Ali
- Martin Ashenden (1962–1965): M. Ashenden
- Alfred Atfield (1893): A. J. Atfield
- Bill Athey (1984–1992): C. W. J. Athey
- James Averis (1994–2006): J. M. M. Averis

== B ==
- Andrew Babington (1991–1994): A. M. Babington
- Archie Bailey (2024): A. G. Bailey (Note: Bailey made his first-class debut in September 2024 against Middlesex. Born at Northampton in 2005 and educated at Malvern College, he had previously played for the Gloucestershire Second XI and the Gloucestershire Academy.)
- Derrick Bailey (1949–1952): D. T. L. Bailey
- William Baillie (1870): W. H. Baillie
- Phil Bainbridge (1977–1990): P. Bainbridge
- Francis Baker (1870–1875): F. Baker
- Edward Ball (1880–1882): E. W. Ball
- Martyn Ball (1988–2006): M. C. J. Ball
- Ethan Bamber (2019): E. R. Bamber
- Cameron Bancroft (2016–2024): C. T. Bancroft
- Malinga Bandara (2005): H. M. C. M. Bandara
- Vikram Banerjee (2006–2011): V. Banerjee
- Stuart Barnes (1989–1991): S. N. Barnes
- Charles Barnett (1904–1926): C. S. Barnett
- Charlie Barnett (1927–1948): C. J. Barnett
- Edgar Barnett (1903–1921): E. P. Barnett
- Kim Barnett (1999–2002): K. J. Barnett
- Percival Barnett (1908–1909): P. P. Barnett
- Arthur Barrow (1919): A. W. Barrow (Note: Barrow was born at Cheltenham in 1897. He played six County Championship matches for the county in 1919. He died at Stoke Bishop in 1943 at the age of 46.)
- Claude Bateman-Champain (1898–1907): C. E. Bateman-Champain
- Francis Bateman-Champain (1895–1914): F. H. Bateman-Champain
- Hugh Bateman-Champain (1888–1902): H. F. Bateman-Champain
- John Bateman-Champain (1899): J. N. Bateman-Champain
- Jonathan Batty (2010–2012): J. N. Batty
- Adrian Becher (1925–1929): A. W. B. Becher
- Charles Belcher (1890–1892): C. F. Belcher
- Malcolm Bell (1990–1991): R. M. H. Bell
- Percy Bell (1911–1912): P. H. Bell
- Gerald Beloe (1898–1899): G. H. Beloe
- Frederick Bendall (1887): F. G. Bendall
- Clement Bengough (1880): C. S. Bengough
- Edward Benson (1929–1931): E. T. Benson
- Richard Bernard (1956–1961): J. R. Bernard
- John Bessant (1921–1928): J. G. W. T. Bessant
- Jacob Bethell (2022): J. G. Bethell
- David Bevan (1964–1970): D. G. Bevan
- Alfred Bewick (1903): A. W. G. Bewick
- Frederick Bird (1899–1900): F. N. Bird
- Mike Bissex (1961–1972): M. Bissex
- Ernest Blackmore (1925): E. G. Blackmore
- Herbert Blagrave (1922): H. H. G. Blagrave
- Bernard Bloodworth (1919–1932): B. S. Bloodworth
- James Bloor (1887): J. H. Bloor
- Jack Board (1891–1914): J. H. Board
- David Boden (1995–1996): D. J. P. Boden
- Ravi Bopara (2012): R. S. Bopara
- Allan Border (1977): A. R. Border
- William Boroughs (1899–1901): W. F. Boroughs
- Hubert Boughton (1884–1888): H. J. Boughton
- William Boughton (1879–1883): W. A. Boughton
- Jack Bowles (1911–1942): J. J. Bowles
- James Bracey (2016–2024): J. R. Bracey
- Frederick Bracher (1895–1897): F. C. Bracher
- Nathan Bracken (2004): N. W. Bracken
- Brian Brain (1976–1981): B. M. Brain
- Joseph Brain (1883–1889): J. H. Brain
- William Brain (1893): W. H. Brain
- Andrew Brassington (1974–1988): A. J. Brassington
- Kraigg Brathwaite (2021): K. C. Brathwaite
- Alastair Bressington (2000–2004): A. N. Bressington
- Edward Brice (1872–1873): E. A. Brice
- Chris Broad (1979–1994): B. C. Broad
- Arthur Brodhurst (1939–1946): A. H. Brodhurst
- Richard Brooke (1931): R. H. J. Brooke
- J. Brooks (1892): J. Brooks (Note: Brooks played a single match for the county, taking one wicket and recording a pair in an 1892 match against Sussex. He was a member of the ground staff at the Bristol County Ground but other than a surname and initial no biographical details are known.)
- Ian Broome (1980): I. Broome
- Rowland Brotherhood (1875): R. Brotherhood
- David Owen Brown (2006–2009): D. O. Brown
- David W. J. Brown (1964–1967): D. W. J. Brown
- Herbert Brown (1890–1894): H. W. H. Brown
- Stanley Brown (1896–1919): W. S. A. Brown
- Tony Brown (1953–1977): A. S. Brown
- Walter Brown (1895): W. M. R. Brown
- Elliott Browne (1872): E. K. Browne
- Gerald Browne (1874): G. E. K. Browne
- Leigh Brownlee (1901–1909): L. D. Brownlee
- Wilfred Brownlee (1909–1914): W. M. Brownlee
- Charles Bruton (1922): C. L. Bruton
- John Bryan (1873): J. Bryan
- John Burrough (1924–1937): J. W. Burrough
- Dean Burrows (1984–1987): D. A. Burrows
- David Burton (2006): D. A. Burton
- James Bush (1870–1890): J. A. Bush
- Robert Edwin Bush (1874–1877): R. E. Bush
- Ian Butcher (1988–1990): I. P. Butcher
- Ian Butler (2003–2010): I. G. Butler

== C ==
- Curtis Campher (2024): C. Campher
- David Carpenter (1954–1963): D. Carpenter
- Frederic Carter (1871–1873): F. A. Carter
- Walter Cave (1883): W. F. Cave
- Mike Cawdron (1995–2001): M. J. Cawdron
- Upul Chandana (2005): U. D. U. Chandana
- Zak Chappell (2019–2022): Z. J. Chappell
- Herbert Chard (1889): H. W. Chard
- Ben Charlesworth (2018–2024): B. G. Charlesworth
- Luke Charlesworth (2022–2024): L. A. Charlesworth
- Hugo Charteris (1910): H. F. W. Charteris
- Algernon Chester-Master (1870): A. W. Chester-Master
- Edgar Chester-Master (1911): E. Chester-Master
- John Childs (1975–1984): J. H. Childs
- Daniel Christian (2013): D. T. Christian
- Matthew Church (1997–1998): M. J. Church
- Basil Clarke (1914–1920): B. F. Clarke
- Howard Cleaton (1971): H. Cleaton
- Henry Clowes (1884): H. Clowes
- Arthur Coates (1873–1878): A. E. Coates
- Halsted Cobden (1872–1873): H. S. Cobden
- Ian Cockbain (2011–2022): I. A. Cockbain
- Frederick Cole (1879–1890): F. L. Cole
- Gilbert Collett (1900–1914): G. F. Collett
- Algernon Collings (1874): A. W. Collings
- Sam Cook (1946–1964): C. Cook
- Kevin Cooper (1992–1996): K. E. Cooper
- Nicholas Cooper (1975–1978): N. H. C. Cooper
- Leonard Corbett (1920–1925): L. J. Corbett
- Norman Cornelius (1910–1911): N. S. Cornelius
- Alan Cornwall (1920): A. E. C. Cornwall
- Tom Cotterell (1999–2001): T. P. Cotterell
- Richard Coughtrie (2011–2013): R. G. Coughtrie
- Ed Cowan (2012): E. J. M. Cowan
- Wilfred Craddy (1928): W. H. Craddy
- Mark Craig (2014): M. D. Craig
- Lionel Cranfield (1903–1922): L. L. Cranfield
- Monty Cranfield (1934–1951): L. M. Cranfield
- Eric Crankshaw (1909): E. N. S. Crankshaw
- James Cranston (1876–1899): J. Cranston
- Jack Crapp (1936–1956): J. F. Crapp
- Ian Crawford (1975–1978): I. C. Crawford
- Frederick Crooke (1874–1875): F. J. Crooke
- Arthur Croome (1885–1892): A. C. M. Croome
- Joseph Cross (1870): J. J. Cross
- George Crossman (1896): G. L. Crossman
- Martin Cullimore (1929): M. H. Cullimore
- Robert Cunliffe (1993–2001): R. J. Cunliffe
- Edward Cunningham (1982–1985): E. J. Cunningham
- Kevin Curran (1985–1990): K. M. Curran
- Oliver Currill (2017): O. C. Currill
- Francis Curteis (1884): F. A. Curteis

== D ==
- Ces Dacre (1928–1936): C. C. R. Dacre
- Ajeet Singh Dale (2022–2024): A. S. Dale
- Chris Dale (1984): C. S. Dale
- John Daniels (1964): J. G. U. Daniels
- Jack Davey (1966–1978): J. Davey
- Mark Davies (1992–1995): M. Davies
- Richard Davis (1996–1997): R. P. Davis
- Brian Davison (1985): B. F. Davison
- Richard Dawson (1991–1999): R. I. Dawson
- Robert Dawson (2008–2011): R. K. J. Dawson
- Leonard Day (1880–1882): L. M. Day
- Marchant de Lange (2023–2024): M. de Lange
- Jason de la Peña (1991–1993): J. M. de la Pêna
- George de Winton (1890–1901): G. S. de Winton
- Tom Dean (1908): T. H. Dean
- Alfred Dearlove (1895–1900): A. J. Dearlove (Note: Born at Kingsdown in 1869, Dearlove played six County Championship matches for Gloucestershire between 1895 and 1900, including four in 1895. He scored 129 runs and took five wickets. He died at Southmead in 1955 aged 85.)
- George Dennett (1902–1926): E. G. Dennett
- Chris Dent (2009–2024): C. D. J. Dent
- Ernest Dewfall (1938): E. G. Dewfall
- Tony Diment (1952): R. A. Diment
- Andy Dindar (1962–1963): A. Dindar
- Alfred Dipper (1908–1932): A. E. Dipper
- Charles Disney (1923): C. R. Disney
- John Dixon (1973–1981): J. H. Dixon
- Richard Doughty (1981–1984): R. J. Doughty
- Brendan Drew (2008): B. G. Drew
- George Drissell (2017–2020): G. S. Drissell
- Arthur du Boulay (1908): A. H. du Boulay
- Barry Dudleston (1981–1983): B. Dudleston
- Malcolm Dunstan (1971–1974): M. S. T. Dunstan

== E ==
- Desmond Eagar (1935–1943): E. D. R. Eagar
- Michael Eagar (1957–1961): M. A. Eagar
- Edwin Eden (1921): E. Eden
- Ben Edmondson (2007): B. M. Edmondson
- Charles Edwards (1911–1912): C. W. Edwards
- Francis Ellis (1914–1921): F. E. Ellis
- Richard Ellis (1985): R. G. P. Ellis
- George Emmett (1936–1959): G. M. Emmett
- Ernest English (1909): E. R. M. English
- Bobby Etheridge (1955–1966): R. J. Etheridge
- David Evans (1889–1891): D. L. Evans

== F ==
- Walter Fairbanks (1877–1884): W. Fairbanks
- Archibald Fargus (1900–1901): A. H. C. Fargus
- J. J. Ferris (1891–1895): J. J. Ferris
- James Fewings (1872): J. Fewings
- Charles Filgate (1870–1877): C. R. Filgate
- Nick Finan (1975–1979): N. H. Finan
- Ian Fisher (2002–2008): I. D. Fisher
- Jim Foat (1972–1979): J. C. Foat
- Ernest Ford (1874–1875): E. C. B. Ford
- John Ford (1951): J. K. Ford (Note: Born at Redland in Bristol in 1934, Ford played a single first-class match for the county, taking one wicket. He played for the Second XI between 1951 and 1956.)
- Percy Ford (1906–1908): P. H. Ford
- Reggie Ford (1929–1936): R. G. Ford
- Theodore Fowler (1901–1914): T. H. Fowler
- John Fox (1872): J. C. K. Fox
- Conway Francis (1895): C. J. Francis
- Guy Francis (1884–1888): G. Francis
- Howard Francis (1890–1894): H. H. Francis
- James Franklin (2004–2010): J. E. C. Franklin
- Sidney Freeman (1920–1921): S. T. Freeman
- James Fuller (2011–2015): J. K. Fuller

== G ==
- Shannon Gabriel (2019): S. T. Gabriel
- Henry Gallop (1877–1883): H. G. Gallop
- Tommy Gange (1913–1920): T. H. Gange
- Ben Gannon (1999–2002): B. W. Gannon
- William Garne (1884): W. H. Garne
- Mike Garnham (1978–1979): M. A. Garnham
- Martin Gerrard (1991–1993): M. J. Gerrard
- Alex Gidman (2001–2014): A. P. R. Gidman
- Will Gidman (2011–2014): W. R. S. Gidman
- Dave Gilbert (1991): D. R. Gilbert
- Walter Gilbert (1876–1886): W. R. Gilbert
- Godwin Giles (1903): G. M. Giles
- Matthew Gitsham (2008): M. T. Gitsham
- Tom Goddard (1922–1952): T. W. J. Goddard
- Dominic Goodman (2021–2024): D. C. Goodman
- Richard Godsell (1903–1910): R. T. Godsell
- Harry Goodwin (1896–1907): H. S. Goodwin
- Frederick Goodwyn (1871–1873): F. W. Goodwyn
- Charles Gordon (1870–1875): C. S. Gordon
- William Gouldsworthy (1921–1929): W. R. Gouldsworthy
- Alfred Grace (1886–1897): A. H. Grace
- E. M. Grace (1870–1896): E. M. Grace
- Fred Grace (1870–1880): G. F. Grace
- Henry Grace (1871): H. Grace
- W. G. Grace (1870–1899): W. G. Grace
- W. G. Grace junior (1892–1898): W. G. Grace junior
- William St Clair Grant (1914): W. S. Grant
- David Graveney (1972–1990): D. A. Graveney
- Ken Graveney (1947–1964): J. K. R. Graveney
- Tom Graveney (1948–1960): T. W. Graveney
- David Green (1968–1973): D. M. Green
- Michael Green (1912–1928): M. A. Green
- Robert Green (1924): R. L. H. Green
- Alan Greene (1876–1886): A. D. Greene
- Robin Greene (1951): R. M. Greene (Note: Born at Durban in South Africa in 1931, Greene played for South African schools teams and opened the bowling in a first-class match for a South African XI against the touring Australians in March 1950. He played once for Gloucestershire during 1951, making scores of 23 not out and 26 not out and taking one wicket against Oxford University. He died in 2014 at Southbroom in South Africa.)
- Vibert Greene (1987–1989): V. S. Greene
- Carl Greenidge (2005–2008): C. G. Greenidge
- Charles Greenway (1890–1891): C. H. Greenway (Note: Greenway played three first-class matches for the county, two in 1890 and one the following season. He took four wickets. Born in 1870 he died in 1953.)
- Thomas Gregg (1884–1889): T. Gregg
- Herbert Gribble (1878–1882): H. W. R. Gribble
- Patrick Grieshaber (2014): P. J. Grieshaber
- Edward Griffiths (1885–1889): E. L. Griffiths
- John Griffiths (1952–1957): J. V. C. Griffiths
- Edward Gurney (1911): E. R. Gurney

== H ==
- Stamford Hacker (1899–1901): W. S. Hacker
- Alfred Haines (1901–1910): A. H. Haines
- Harold Hale (1886–1889): H. Hale
- Ivor Hale (1947–1948): I. E. Hale
- Walter Hale (1895–1909): W. H. Hale
- John Halford (1870–1874): J. Halford
- Miles Hammond (2013–2024): M. A. H. Hammond
- Wally Hammond (1920–1951): W. R. Hammond
- Thomas Hampton (2015–2016): T. R. G. Hampton
- Tim Hancock (1991–2005): T. H. C. Hancock
- Peter Handscomb (2015): P. S. P. Handscomb
- George Hankins (2016–2021): G. T. Hankins
- Harry Hankins (2019–2021): H. J. Hankins
- Leonard Harbin (1949–1951): L. Harbin
- Mark Hardinges (1999–2008): M. A. Hardinges
- Jon Hardy (1991): J. J. E. Hardy
- Andrew Harris (2008): A. J. Harris
- Chris Harris (2003): C. Z. Harris
- Frank Harris (1929–1931): F. A. Harris
- Marcus Harris (2022–2023): M. S. Harris
- Stanley Harris (1902): S. S. Harris
- Ian Harvey (1999–2006): I. J. Harvey
- Percy Hattersley-Smith (1878–1880): P. Hattersley-Smith
- John Hatton (1884): J. Hatton
- Derek Hawkins (1952–1962): D. G. Hawkins
- Edward Haygarth (1883): E. B. Haygarth
- Carleton Haynes (1877–1879): C. Haynes
- Richard Haynes (1930–1939): R. W. Haynes
- Michael Heal (1973): M. G. Heal
- John Healing (1894–1906): J. A. Healing
- Percival Healing (1911): P. Healing
- Hartley Heard (1969): H. Heard
- Arthur Heath (1875): A. H. Heath
- Walter Heath (1886): W. Heath
- Lionel Hedges (1926–1929): L. P. Hedges
- George Hemingway (1898): G. E. Hemingway
- William Hemingway (1893–1900): W. M. Hemingway
- Cameron Herring (2013–2014): C. L. Herring
- Reginald Hewlett (1909–1922): R. J. Hewlett
- Dominic Hewson (1996–2001): D. R. Hewson
- Ryan Higgins (2018–2022): R. F. Higgins
- Alastair Hignell (1974–1983): A. J. Hignell
- Antony Hignell (1947): A. F. Hignell
- Alfred Hill (1904–1905): A. W. Hill
- Frank Hinde (1895): F. L. Hinde
- Simon Hinks (1992–1994): S. G. Hinks
- Ernest Hoare (1929): E. S. Hoare
- Norman Hobbs (1924): N. F. C. Hobbs
- Henry Hodgkins (1900–1901): H. J. J. Hodgkins
- Dean Hodgson (1989–1995): G. D. Hodgson
- Grant Hodnett (2005–2009): G. P. Hodnett
- Cyril Hollinshead (1941–1946): C. Hollinshead
- George Holloway (1908–1911): G. J. W. S. Holloway
- Reginald Holloway (1923–1926): R. F. P. Holloway
- Vic Hopkins (1934–1948): V. Hopkins
- Reginald Hopwood (1924): R. A. Hopwood
- James Horlick (1907–1910): J. N. Horlick
- R. Horton (1925): R. Horton
- Worthington Hoskin (1912): W. W. Hoskin
- Dan Housego (2012–2014): D. M. Housego
- Benny Howell (2012–2022): B. A. C. Howell
- John Howman (1922–1923): J. Howman
- Henry Huggins (1901–1921): H. J. Huggins
- Alan Hunt (1991–1992): A. J. Hunt
- Kenneth Hunt (1926): K. Hunt
- James Husey-Hunt (1880): J. H. Husey-Hunt
- Gemaal Hussain (2009–2010): G. M. Hussain
- Michael Hussey (2004): M. E. K. Hussey

== I ==
- Kassem Ibadulla (1987–1989): K. B. K. Ibadulla
- John Iles (1890–1891): J. H. Iles
- Alan Imlay (1905–1911): A. D. Imlay
- Anthony Ireland (2007–2012): A. J. Ireland

== J ==
- Rattan Jaidka (1927): R. C. Jaidka
- Burnet James (1914): B. G. James
- Harold Jarman (1961–1971): H. J. Jarman
- Kevin Jarvis (1988–1990): K. B. S. Jarvis
- Harry Jefferies (1919): H. Jefferies
- Herbert Jenner-Fust (1875): H. Jenner-Fust
- Gilbert Jessop (1894–1914): G. L. Jessop
- Hylton Jessop (1896–1897): H. Jessop
- Osman Jessop (1901–1911): O. W. T. Jessop
- Walter Jessop (1920–1921): W. H. Jessop
- Geraint Jones (2014–2015): G. O. Jones
- Hugh Jones (1914): H. Jones

== K ==
- Kadeer Ali (2005–2010): Kadeer Ali
- R. P. Keigwin (1921–1923): R. P. Keigwin
- Cuthbert Kempe (1877–1878): C. R. Kempe
- Edmund King (1927): E. P. King
- James King (1966): J. M. R. King
- Henry Kingscote (1877): H. B. Kingscote
- William Kington (1875–1876): W. M. N. Kington
- Charles King-Turner (1922): C. J. King-Turner
- Steven Kirby (2005–2010): S. P. Kirby
- Sidney Kitcat (1892–1904): S. A. P. Kitcat
- Michael Klinger (2013–2019): M. Klinger
- Edward Knapp (1871–1880): E. M. M. Knapp
- Roger Knight (1971–1975): R. D. V. Knight
- Bill Knightley-Smith (1955–1957): W. Knightley-Smith

== L ==
- Tom Lace (2020–2022): T. C. Lace
- Graham Lake (1956–1958): G. J. Lake
- Arthur Lamb (1895–1896): A. Lamb
- Danny Lamb (2023): D. J. Lamb
- George Lambert (1938–1957): G. E. E. Lambert
- Robert Lanchbury (1971): R. J. Lanchbury
- Sivell Lane (1901): S. Lane
- Thomas Lang (1872–1874): T. W. Lang
- Thomas Langdon (1900–1914): T. Langdon
- David Lawrence (1981–1997): D. V. Lawrence
- Joseph Lawson (1914): J. F. Lawson
- Albert Leatham (1883–1884): A. E. Leatham
- Solomon Levy (1910–1911): S. Levy
- Jon Lewis (1995–2011): J. Lewis
- Christopher Liddle (2017–2019): C. J. Liddle
- Jake Lintott (2018): J. B. Lintott
- Jeremy Lloyds (1985–1991): J. W. Lloyds
- Arthur Luard (1892–1907): A. J. H. Luard
- Frank Luce (1901–1911): F. M. Luce
- Monte Lynch (1995–1997): M. A. Lynch
- Bev Lyon (1921–1947): B. H. Lyon

== M ==
- James MacDonnell (1881): J. E. MacDonnell
- Claude Mackay (1914): C. L. Mackay
- Robert Mackenzie (1907): R. T. H. Mackenzie
- John MacLean (1930–1932): J. F. MacLean
- Greg Macmillan (1998): G. I. Macmillan
- William Macpherson (1870–1871): W. D. L. Macpherson
- Humphrey Mainprice (1905): H. Mainprice
- Geoffrey Mains (1951–1954): G. Mains
- Herbert Manners (1902–1911): H. C. Manners
- Charles Margrett (1886): C. H. Margrett
- Edmund Marsden (1909): E. Marsden
- Hamish Marshall (2006–2016): H. J. H. Marshall
- Alan Matthews (1933–1938): A. I. Matthews (Note: Born at Keynsham in Somerset in 1913, Matthews played 16 first-class matches for the county between 1933 and 1938, 13 of which were played in 1934. A right-arm fast-medium bowler, he took 14 wickets and scored 185 runs, including a half-century against Hampshire in 1934. He played Minor Counties Championship cricket for Wiltshire in 1948. He died at Port Macquarie in New South Wales in 1996 at the age of 82.)
- John Matthews (1872): J. L. Matthews (Note: Matthews, who was born at Clifton in Bristol in 1847, played a single first-class match for the county. He neither batted or bowled in the match, an 1872 fixture against Sussex. He died at Maidenhead in 1912. His brother, Thomas Matthews, also played for Gloucestershire.)
- Thomas Matthews (1870–1879): T. G. Matthews
- Maurice McCanlis (1929): M. A. McCanlis
- Graeme McCarter (2012–2014): G. J. McCarter
- William McClintock (1920–1921): W. K. McClintock
- Francis McHugh (1952–1956): F. P. McHugh
- Craig McMillan (2003): C. D. McMillan
- Bernard Meakin (1906): B. Meakin
- Robert Melsome (1925–1934): R. G. W. Melsome
- Michael Mence (1966–1967): M. D. Mence
- Horace Merrick (1909–1911): H. Merrick
- Sam Meston (1906): S. P. Meston
- Barrie Meyer (1957–1971): B. J. Meyer
- William Meyer (1909–1910): W. E. Meyer
- Ed Middleton (2023–2024): E. W. O. Middleton
- Billy Midwinter (1877–1882): W. E. Midwinter
- Edward Milburn (1990–1991): E. T. Milburn
- Craig Miles (2011–2018): C. N. Miles
- Robert Miles (1870–1879): R. F. Miles
- Thomas Miller (1902–1914): T. Miller
- Anthony Mills (1939–1948): A. O. H. Mills
- David Mills (1958): D. C. Mills
- John Mills (1870): J. Mills
- Percy Mills (1902–1943): P. T. Mills
- Arthur Milton (1948–1974): C. A. Milton
- William Mirehouse (1872): W. E. Mirehouse
- Ian Mitchell (1950–1952): I. N. Mitchell
- William Moberly (1876–1887): W. O. Moberly
- Mohammad Amir (2022): Mohammad Amir
- Imraan Mohammad (2000): I. Mohammad
- Edgar Moline (1878): E. R. Moline
- Francis Monkland (1874–1879): F. G. Monkland
- Clifford Monks (1935–1952): C. I. Monks
- Denis Moore (1930–1941): D. N. Moore
- Donald Morgan (1907): D. L. Morgan
- Edward Morris (1870): E. S. Morris
- Ewart Morrison (1926–1933): E. G. Morrison (Note: Born at Kotagala, Ceylon in 1899, Morrison made 20 first-class appearances for the county between 1926 and 1933, 12 of which were in his debut season. A left-handed batsman, he scored 340 runs with a highest score of 59 against Worcestershire in 1926. He died in Lewes in 1985 at the age of 85.)
- John Mortimore (1950–1975): J. B. Mortimore
- Paul Muchall (2012): P. B. Muchall
- Muttiah Muralitharan (2011–2012): M. Muralitharan
- William Murch (1889–1903): W. H. Murch
- Ernest Murdock (1889): E. G. Murdock
- Philip Mustard (2016–2017): P. Mustard

== N ==
- Will Nash (2022): W. L. Naish (Note: Naish made his Twenty20 debut in May 2022 against the Sri Lanka Development XI. He had previously played for the Gloucestershire Second XI and the Gloucestershire Academy and for Wiltshire in National Counties cricket. He was born at Guildford in 2003 and educated at Wycliffe College and Clifton College.)
- Naseem Shah (2022): Naseem Shah
- William Nash (1905–1906): W. W. H. Nash
- John Nason (1913–1914): J. W. W. Nason
- Reginald Neal (1922): R. G. Neal
- William Neale (1923–1948): W. L. Neale
- Oliver Newby (2008): O. J. Newby
- Arthur Newnham (1887–1894): A. T. H. Newnham
- Ron Nicholls (1951–1975): R. B. Nicholls
- George Nichols (1883–1885): G. B. Nichols
- Rob Nicol (2012): R. J. Nicol
- Kieran Noema-Barnett (2015–2018): K. Noema-Barnett
- Ashley Noffke (2007): A. A. Noffke
- James Norley (1877): J. Norley
- Albert North (1912): A. E. C. North
- Marcus North (2007–2008): M. J. North
- Liam Norwell (2011–2018): L. C. Norwell
- Arthur Nott (1903–1912): A. S. Nott (Note: Nott played 15 County Championship matches for the county between 1903 and 1912. An occasional wicket-keeper, he scored a total of 182 first-class runs. Born at Westbury-on-Trym in 1881, he died in Warwickshire in 1959 aged 78.)

== O ==
- Kevin O'Brien (2011): K. J. O'Brien
- Paul Owen (1990): P. A. Owen

== P ==
- Dallas Page (1933–1936): D. A. C. Page
- Herbert Page (1883–1895): H. V. Page
- Julian Page (1974): J. T. Page
- John Painter (1881–1897): J. R. Painter
- Arthur Paish (1898–1903): A. J. Paish
- Charlie Parker (1903–1935): C. W. L. Parker
- Grahame Parker (1932–1951): G. W. Parker
- David Partridge (1976–1980): M. D. Partridge
- David Payne (2009–2024): D. A. Payne
- Ian Payne (1985–1986): I. R. Payne
- Edward Peake (1881–1889): E. Peake
- James Pearson (2002–2005): J. A. Pearson
- Guy Pedder (1925): G. R. Pedder
- Arthur Penduck (1908–1909): A. E. Penduck
- George Pepall (1896–1904): G. Pepall
- John Percival (1923): J. D. Percival
- Tissara Perera (2017–2018): N. L. T. C. Perera
- Glenn Phillips (2021–2022): G. D. Phillips
- Joe Phillips (2023–2024): J. P. Phillips
- Wycliffe Phillips (1968–1970): R. W. Phillips
- Arthur Pickering (1908): A. Pickering (Note: Born at Bristol in 1878, Pickering played two first-class matches, one for London County in 1901 and one for Gloucestershire in 1908. He died at Cotham in 1939.)
- Vyvian Pike (1994–1995): V. J. Pike
- Alfred Pontifex (1871): A. Pontifex
- Malcolm Pooley (1988–1990): M. W. Pooley
- Andrew Pope (1911): A. N. Pope
- Dudley Pope (1925–1927): D. F. Pope
- Roland Pope (1891): R. J. Pope
- Stephen Pope (2002–2003): S. P. Pope
- William Porterfield (2008–2010): W. T. S. Porterfield
- Charley Price (1919): C. J. Price
- Frederic Price (1872): F. R. Price
- Ollie Price (2021–2024): O. J. Price
- Tom Price (2019–2024): T. J. Price
- Hubert Prichard (1896): H. C. Prichard
- Donald Priestley (1909–1910): D. L. Priestley
- Mike Procter (1965–1981): M. J. Procter
- Tom Pugh (1959–1962): C. T. M. Pugh
- Geoff Pullar (1969–1970): G. Pullar
- William Pullen (1882–1892): W. W. F. Pullen

== Q ==
- George Quentin (1874): G. A. F. Quentin

== R ==
- Octavius Radcliffe (1886–1893): O. G. Radcliffe
- Douglas Raikes (1932): D. C. G. Raikes
- Gilbert Rattenbury (1902–1909): G. L. Rattenbury
- Chris Read (1997): C. M. W. Read
- Aaron Redmond (2010): A. J. Redmond
- Henry Reed (1921–1923): H. A. Reed
- Jonty Rhodes (2003): J. N. Rhodes
- Reginald Rice (1890–1903): R. W. Rice
- Barry Richards (1965): B. A. Richards
- Alfred Richardson (1897–1901): A. G. Richardson
- Terence Riley (1964): T. M. N. Riley
- George Robathan (1922): G. L. Robathan
- Arthur Roberts (1908–1913): A. W. Roberts
- Francis Roberts (1906–1914): F. B. Roberts
- Frederick G. Roberts (1887–1905): F. G. Roberts
- Lambert Roberts (1900): L. L. Roberts
- Arthur Robinson (1878): A. Robinson
- Douglas Robinson (1905–1926): D. C. Robinson
- Foster Robinson (1903–1923): F. G. Robinson
- John Robinson (1929): J. F. Robinson
- Percy Robinson (1904–1921): P. G. Robinson
- Vivian Robinson (1923): V. J. Robinson
- Peter Rochford (1952–1957): P. Rochford
- Gareth Roderick (2013–2020): G. H. Roderick
- Paul Roebuck (1984): P. G. P. Roebuck
- Grant Roelofsen (2023): G. Roelofsen
- Francis Rogers (1924–1931): F. G. Rogers
- Joseph Rogers (1929–1933): J. A. Rogers
- Lawson Roll (1984): L. M. Roll
- Paul Romaines (1982–1991): P. W. Romaines
- George Romans (1899–1903): G. Romans
- Arthur Roper (1920–1921): A. W. F. Roper (Note: Roper, who was born at Bedminster in 1890, played 13 County Championship matches for Gloucestershire in 1920 and 1921. He scored a total of 226 runs, including a half-century made against Lancashire in 1921. He died at Marylebone in London in 1956 aged 66.)
- Adam Rouse (2014): A. P. Rouse
- Frank Rowlands (1920–1922): F. Rowlands
- William Rowlands (1901–1928): W. H. Rowlands
- Will Rudge (2002–2008): W. D. Rudge
- Jack Russell (1981–2004): R. C. Russell
- Sid Russell (1965–1968): S. E. J. Russell
- Thomas Rust (1914): T. H. Rust

== S ==
- Sadiq Mohammad (1972–1982): Sadiq Mohammad
- Edward Sainsbury (1891–1892): E. Sainsbury
- Gary Sainsbury (1983–1987): G. E. Sainsbury
- Malcolm Salter (1907–1925): M. G. Salter
- Ramnaresh Sarwan (2005): R. R. Sarwan
- Henry Savory (1937): H. J. Savory
- Ian Saxelby (2008–2014): I. D. Saxelby
- Chadd Sayers (2019): C. J. Sayers
- Colin Scott (1938–1954): C. J. Scott
- Edward Scott (1937): E. K. Scott
- George Scott (2020–2022): G. F. B. Scott
- Osmund Scott (1905): O. Scott
- Richard Scott (1991–1993): R. J. Scott
- Frederick Seabrook (1919–1935): F. J. Seabrook
- Walter Seabrook (1928): W. G. Seabrook
- Arthur Sellick (1903–1904): A. S. Sellick
- Arthur Serjeant (1883): A. T. Serjeant (Note: Born at Clifton in 1856, Serjeant played three matches for the county in 1883, scoring 41 runs. He died at Bristol in 1916 aged 60.)
- Cyril Sewell (1895–1919): C. O. H. Sewell
- Jack Sewell (1937–1942): F. J. Sewell
- Shabbir Ahmed (2004): Shabbir Ahmed
- Julian Shackleton (1971–1978): J. H. Shackleton
- Brian Shantry (1978–1979): B. K. Shantry
- Josh Shaw (2016–2024): J. Shaw
- Kamran Sheeraz (1994–1997): K. P. Sheeraz
- David Shepherd (1965–1979): D. R. Shepherd
- John Shepherd (1982–1987): J. N. Shepherd
- Edward Sheppard (1921–1922): E. C. J. Sheppard
- Shoaib Malik (2003–2004): Shoaib Malik
- Tom Shrewsbury (2013–2014): T. W. Shrewsbury
- Herbert Shrimpton (1923): H. J. D. Shrimpton
- Roger Sillence (2001–2005): R. J. Sillence
- William Simmonds (1924–1925): W. H. Simmonds
- David Simpkins (1982): D. P. Simpkins
- Reg Sinfield (1924–1939): R. A. Sinfield
- David Smith (1956–1971): D. R. Smith
- Edwin Smith (1875–1877): E. G. Smith
- Harry Smith (1912–1935): H. Smith
- Mike Smith (1991–2004): A. M. Smith
- Oliver Smith (1987): O. C. K. Smith
- Tom Smith (2013–2024): T. M. J. Smith
- Jeremy Snape (1999–2002): J. N. Snape
- Steve Snell (2005–2010): S. D. Snell
- Kenneth Soutar (1908): K. H. Soutar
- Craig Spearman (2002–2009): C. M. Spearman
- Edward Spry (1899–1921): E. J. Spry
- Javagal Srinath (1995): J. Srinath
- Ernest Staddon (1912): E. H. Staddon
- John Stanton (1921–1922): J. L. Stanton
- Tom Stayt (2007–2009): T. P. Stayt
- Eric Stephens (1927–1941): E. J. Stephens
- Franklyn Stephenson (1982–1983): F. D. Stephenson
- Joseph Stephenson-Jellie (1896–1908): J. W. A. Stephenson-Jellie
- Wes Stewart (1966): R. W. Stewart
- Andy Stovold (1973–1990): A. W. Stovold
- Martin Stovold (1978–1982): M. W. Stovold
- George Strachan (1870–1882): G. Strachan
- Edward Studd (1919): E. B. T. Studd
- John Sullivan (1967–1977): J. P. Sullivan
- Godfrey Surman (1936–1937): G. P. Surman
- David Surridge (1980–1982): D. Surridge
- Roy Swetman (1972–1974): R. Swetman
- Andrew Symonds (1995–1996): A. Symonds

== T ==
- Noel Tagart (1900–1901): N. O. Tagart
- Alan Tait (1978): A. Tait
- Jonny Tattersall (2021): J. A. Tattersall
- William Tavaré (2014–2018): W. A. Tavaré
- Bert Tayler (1914): H. W. Tayler
- Frederick Tayler (1911): F. E. Tayler
- Chris Taylor (1999–2011): C. G. Taylor
- Clifford Taylor (1899–1900): C. J. Taylor
- Edmund Taylor (1876–1886): E. J. Taylor
- Frank Taylor (1873): F. Taylor
- Jack Taylor (2010–2024): J. M. R. Taylor
- Matt Taylor (2011–2024): M. D. Taylor
- Phil Taylor (1938): P. H. Taylor
- Harry Tector (2023): H. T. Tector
- Geoffrey Tedstone (1989–1990): G. A. Tedstone
- David Thomas (1988): D. J. Thomas
- Edgar Thomas (1895–1907): E. L. Thomas
- Frank Thomas (1901–1906): F. E. Thomas
- Jackson Thompson (2007–2008): J. G. Thompson
- Philip Thorn (1974): P. L. Thorn
- Herbert Timms (1911–1912): H. H. Timms
- Keith Tomlins (1986–1987): K. P. Tomlins
- William Tonge (1880): W. C. Tonge
- Thomas Toogood (1900–1914): T. H. Toogood
- Wilson Tovey (1901): W. G. Tovey
- Charlie Townsend (1893–1922): C. L. Townsend
- Frank Townsend (1870–1892): F. Townsend
- Frank Townsend, junior (1896–1900): F. N. Townsend
- Miles Townsend (1903–1906): A. F. M. Townsend
- Sean Tracy (1983): S. R. Tracy
- Nicholas Trainor (1996–1998): N. J. Trainor
- Christopher Trembath (1982–1984): C. R. Trembath
- James Tremenheere (1872): J. H. A. Tremenheere
- Frank Troup (1914–1921): F. C. Troup
- Walter Troup (1887–1911): W. Troup
- Thomas Truman (1910–1913): T. A. Truman
- Bertrand Turnbull (1911): B. Turnbull
- Charles Turnbull (1873–1879): C. L. Turnbull (Note: Turnbull, who was born at Gloucester in 1851, played one first-class match, recording a duck in his only innings against Yorkshire in 1873. he died at Swindon in 1920.)
- Charles Turner (1886–1889): C. Turner
- Ronald Turner (1906): R. Turner
- Henry Twizell (1985–1986): P. H. Twizell
- Andrew Tye (2016–2019): A. J. Tye
- Cyril Tyler (1936–1938): C. Tyler

== V ==
- Graeme van Buuren (2016–2024): G. L. van Buuren
- Paul van der Gucht (1932–1933): P. I. van der Gucht
- Paul van Meekeren (2022–2023): P. A. van Meekeren
- Justin Vaughan (1992): J. T. C. Vaughan
- Martin Vernon (1977): M. J. Vernon
- Walter Vizard (1882–1890): W. O. Vizard

== W ==
- Nesbit Wallace (1871): N. W. Wallace
- Courtney Walsh (1984–1998): C. A. Walsh
- Jared Warner (2021–2022): J. D. Warner
- Albert Waters (1923–1925): A. E. Waters
- Bertram Watkins (1932–1938): B. T. L. Watkins
- Frederic Watts (1905): F. A. Watts
- Lawrence Watts (1958): L. D. Watts
- Frederick Weaver (1897–1909): F. C. Weaver
- Beau Webster (2024): B. J. Webster
- George Wedel (1925–1929): G. Wedel
- Frederick Weeks (1925–1928): F. J. Weeks
- Ben Wells (2021–2023): B. J. J. Wells
- Bomber Wells (1951–1959): B. D. Wells
- Stuart Westley (1969–1971): S. A. Westley
- Phil Weston (2003–2006): W. P. C. Weston
- Brad Wheal (2022): B. T. J. Wheal
- Richard Whiley (1954): R. K. Whiley
- Alison White (1912–1919): A. K. G. White
- Ray White (1962–1964): R. C. White
- Mike Whitney (1981): M. R. Whitney
- Frank Wicks (1912): F. C. Wicks
- Marcus Wight (1993–1994): R. M. Wight
- David Wigley (2008): D. H. Wigley
- Eric Wignall (1952–1953): E. W. E. Wignall
- Alfred Wilcox (1939–1949): A. G. S. Wilcox
- Alan Wilkins (1980–1981): A. H. Wilkins
- John Wilkinson (1899–1920): J. Wilkinson
- John Williams (1908): J. N. Williams
- Leo Williams (1922): L. Williams
- Philip Williams (1919–1925): P. F. C. Williams
- Reggie Williams (1990–2001): R. C. J. Williams
- Ricardo Williams (1991–1995): R. C. Williams
- Stephen Williams (1978): S. Williams
- Kane Williamson (2011–2012): K. S. Williamson
- Gregory Willows (2019): G. P. Willows
- Andy Wilson (1936–1955): A. E. Wilson
- Graham Wiltshire (1953–1960): G. G. M. Wiltshire
- Stephen Windaybank (1979–1982): S. J. Windaybank
- Matthew Windows (1992–2006): M. G. N. Windows
- Tony Windows (1960–1974): A. R. Windows
- Alec Winstone (1906–1909): A. E. Winstone
- Arthur Winterbotham (1885): A. S. Winterbotham
- James Winterbotham (1902): J. P. Winterbotham
- Henry Witchell (1923): H. G. Witchell
- Russell Wood (1950–1951): R. B. Wood
- Reginald Woodman (1925): R. G. Woodman
- Robert Woodman (2008–2010): R. J. Woodman
- William Woof (1878–1902): W. A. Woof
- Gilbert Wooley (1920): G. G. Wooley
- Claud Woolley (1909): C. N. Woolley
- Simon Wootton (1984): S. H. Wootton
- Daniel Worrall (2018–2021): D. J. Worrall
- Harry Wrathall (1894–1907): H. Wrathall
- Charles Wreford-Brown (1886–1898): C. Wreford-Brown
- Oswald Wreford-Brown (1900): O. E. Wreford-Brown
- Edward Wright, born 1858 (1878): E. F. Wright
- Edward Wright, born 1874 (1894–1898): E. C. Wright
- Tony Wright (1980–1998): A. J. Wright
- George Wyatt (1871–1876): G. N. Wyatt

== Y ==
- William Yalland (1910): W. S. Yalland
- Gerald Yorke (1925): G. J. Yorke
- Vincent Yorke (1898): V. W. Yorke
- Ed Young (2010–2013): E. G. C. Young
- Martin Young (1949–1964): D. M. Young
- Shaun Young (1997): S. Young

== Z ==
- Zafar Gohar (2021–2024): Zafar Gohar
- Zaheer Abbas (1972–1985): Zaheer Abbas

== See also ==
- List of Gloucestershire cricket captains

== Bibliography ==
Croudy B, Thorn P (1979) Gloucestershire Cricketers 1870–1979. Cleethorpes: The Association of Cricket Statisticians. (Available online at The Association of Cricket Statisticians and Historians. Retrieved 8 June 2025.)
