= Bertram Watkins =

English cricketer

Personal information
- Full name: Bertram Thomas Lewis Watkins
- Born: 25 June 1902; Gloucester, Gloucestershire, England
- Died: 22 December 1982 (aged 80); Badminton, Gloucestershire, England
- Batting: Right-handed
- Role: Wicket-keeper

Domestic team information
- Years: Team
- 1932–1938: Gloucestershire

Career statistics
Competition	First-class
Matches	30
Runs scored	211
Batting average	6.02
100s/50s	0/0
Top score	25
Catches/stumpings	35/18
- Source: Cricinfo, 15 June 2023

Bertram Thomas Lewis Watkins (25 June 1902 – 22 December 1982) was an English cricketer. He played 30 matches of first-class cricket for Gloucestershire as a wicket-keeper between 1932 and 1938.

Watkins made his first-class debut in 1932 against Glamorgan. He was one of five wicket-keepers used by Gloucestershire over the course of the season in the absence of regular keeper Harry Smith. Watkins trial of eight appearances accrued him 11 dismissals (seven catches and four stumpings) and 27 runs at an average of 3.

Watkins returned to first-class cricket in 1937 when called upon by Gloucestershire after keeper Vic Hopkins broke a finger. When Hopkins returned to the team it was as a batsman and Watkins retained the gloves for the rest of the season, in 21 matches he took 41 dismissals and scored 161 runs at 6.70. He did sufficiently well to get capped and secured terms for the following season. However he featured just once in 1938, making his final first-class appearance against Leicestershire, as Andy Wilson emerged as the long-term successor to Harry Smith.

During the 1930s, Watkins acted as groundsman as well as playing for Gloucester City CC. Following the Second World War he was employed by the Duke of Beaufort as groundsman of the cricket ground at Badminton House.
