= Charles Turnbull =

Charles Turnbull may refer to:

- Charles Wesley Turnbull (1935–2022), governor of the U.S. Virgin Islands
- Charles Turnbull (cricketer) (1851–1920), English cricketer
