= Walter Heath =

Walter Heath can refer to:

- Walter Heath (Gloucestershire cricketer) (1860–1937), English cricketer
- Walter Heath (Surrey cricketer) (1897–1965), English cricketer
