= John Halford (disambiguation) =

John Halford was a cricketer.

John Halford may also refer to:

- Johnny Halford, NASCAR driver
- Sir John Halford, 4th Baronet, of the Halford baronets
- Jack Halford, John "Jack" Halford, fictional character in New Tricks
