= Sivell =

Sivell can be both a masculine given name and a surname. Notable people with the name include:

== Given name ==
- Sivell Lane (1881–1961), English cricketer

== Surname ==
- Jim Sivell (1914–1997), American football guard
- Laurie Sivell (born 1951), English football goalkeeper
- Rhoda Cosgrave Sivell, Irish-Canadian poet and rancher
- Richard Sivell, New Zealand conspiracy theorist
- Robert Sivell, Scottish portrait artist

== See also ==
- Sivells Bend, Texas, U.S., an unincorporated community
