= Cleaton =

Cleaton may refer to:

- Cleaton, Kentucky, an unincorporated community in Muhlenberg County
- Howard Cleaton, a former Welsh cricketer
