= The Medium (1951 film) =

1951 film

- Directed by: Gian Carlo Menotti
- Written by: Gian Carlo Menotti
- Produced by: Chandler Cowles; Evan M. Frankel; Walther Lowendahl; Milton Perlman
- Starring: Marie Powers
- Cinematography: Enzo Serafin
- Edited by: Alexander Hammid
- Distributed by: Lopert Pictures (United States)
- Release date: 5 September 1951
- Running time: 84 minutes
- Country: Italy
- Language: Italian

The Medium (Italian: La medium) is a 1951 Italian drama film directed by Gian Carlo Menotti. It is based on the opera of the same name and was entered into the 1952 Cannes Film Festival. It would later be screened out of competition at the 1987 Cannes Film Festival.

== Plot ==
Madame Flora is a fraudulent medium, mother of Toby, who is mute and crippled. This condition of Toby's is important for plucking clients... During a session, Flora feels a hand squeezing her throat. She deduces that this is her son's doing and throws him out into the rain. Toby returns, to meet with Monica, his girlfriend and Flora's assistant. Flora thinks thieves have broken into the house and kills her son. Is she punished-by divine intervention?

== Cast ==
- Marie Powers - Madame Flora
- Leopoldo Savona - Toby (as Leo Coleman)
- Belva Kibler - Mrs. Nolan
- Beverly Dame - Mrs. Gobineau
- Donald Morgan - Mr. Gobineau
- Anna Maria Alberghetti - Monica
