= Walter Jessop =

Walter Jessop may refer to:

- Walter Jessop (cricketer)
- Walter Jessop (surgeon)

== See also ==
- Walter Albert Jessup (1877–1944), American academic administrator
