= Shrimpton =

Shrimpton is a surname. Notable people with the surname include:

- Chrissie Shrimpton (born 1945), British model and actress; Jean Shrimpton's younger sister
- Herbert Shrimpton (1903–1979), English cricketer
- Jean Shrimpton (born 1942), British supermodel and actress; Chrissie Shrimpton's older sister
- Major-General John Shrimpton, British Army general, Governor of Gibraltar 1704–1707; Member of Parliament for Whitchurch
- Mark Shrimpton, known as Distant Soundz, British dance artist
- Michael Shrimpton (born 1957), British barrister
- Mike Shrimpton (born 1940), New Zealand cricketer
- Richard Shrimpton (1910–1979), British boxer
