= Reggie Ford =

Reggie Ford may refer to:

- Reggie Ford (cricketer)
- Reggie Ford (boxer)

== See also ==
- Reginald Ford, New Zealand explorer, land agent and architect
