= Albert Waters =

English cricketer

Personal information
- Full name: Albert Edward Waters
- Born: 8 May 1902; Stoke Bishop, Bristol, England
- Died: 28 May 1985 (aged 83); Bristol, England
- Batting: Right-handed
- Bowling: Unknown

Domestic team information
- Years: Team
- 1928–1931: Wiltshire
- 1923–1925: Gloucestershire

Career statistics
Competition	First-class
Matches	16
Runs scored	270
Batting average	12.85
100s/50s	–/–
Top score	42
Balls bowled	666
Wickets	5
Bowling average	75.40
5 wickets in innings	–
10 wickets in match	–
Best bowling	2/13
Catches/stumpings	9/–
- Source: Cricinfo, 5 July 2012

Albert Edward Waters (8 May 1902 – 25 June 1985) was an English cricketer. Waters was a right-handed batsman, although his bowling style is unknown. He was born at Stoke Bishop, Bristol.

Waters made his first-class debut for Gloucestershire against Glamorgan in the 1923 County Championship at The Victoria Ground, Cheltenham. Waters made fifteen further first-class appearances for the county, the last of which came against Sussex at Greenbank Cricket Ground, Bristol, in the 1925 County Championship. In his sixteen first-class matches, he scored 270 runs at an average of 12.85, with a high score of 42. With the ball, he took 5 wickets at a bowling average of 75.40, with best figures of 2/13. He later played minor counties cricket for Wiltshire, making his debut for the county against the Surrey Second XI at The Oval in the 1928 Minor Counties Championship. He made fourteen further Minor Counties Championship appearances for Wiltshire, the last of which came against the Kent Second XI in the 1931 Minor Counties Championship.

He died at Bristol on 25 June 1985.
