= Peter Rochford =

English cricketer

Personal information
- Full name: Peter Rochford
- Born: 27 August 1928; Halifax, Yorkshire, England
- Died: 18 June 1992 (aged 63); Stroud, Gloucestershire, England
- Batting: Right-handed
- Role: Wicketkeeper, umpire

Domestic team information
- Years: Team
- 1952–57: Gloucestershire
- First-class debut: 28 June 1952 Gloucestershire v Cambridge University
- Last First-class: 15 August 1957 Gloucestershire v Hampshire

Career statistics
Competition	First-class
Matches	80
Runs scored	479
Batting average	5.26
100s/50s	–/–
Top score	31*
Balls bowled	–
Wickets	–
Bowling average	–
5 wickets in innings	–
10 wickets in match	–
Best bowling	–
Catches/stumpings	118/34
- Source: CricketArchive, 5 August 2011

Peter Rochford (27 August 1928 – 18 June 1992) was an English cricketer who played first-class cricket for Gloucestershire between 1952 and 1957. He was born in Halifax, Yorkshire and died at Stroud, Gloucestershire.

A right-handed tail-end batsman and wicketkeeper, Rochford played for Yorkshire's second eleven in the Minor Counties Championship in 1951 before joining Gloucestershire for 1952. Unable to displace regular wicketkeeper Andy Wilson, who was a far better batsman, he played just two first-class games in 1952 and one in 1953, and made only eight appearances in 1954, when Wilson was 44. In 1955, however, Rochford took over as the regular wicketkeeper, playing in 30 matches and making 60 dismissals, and being awarded his county cap. His batting did not develop, however, and his highest score of the season was just 16 not out. There were a few signs of batting improvement in 1956 when, with 31 not out against Oxford University, Rochford made his highest score, and with Bryan Wells, Sam Cook and Francis McHugh in Gloucestershire's side, Rochford often batted far higher in the order than his batting talent warranted. He again made 60 dismissals in the season. After a few matches in 1957, he lost his place and with both Bobby Etheridge and Barrie Meyer available, he left the Gloucestershire staff at the end of the season. His obituary in Wisden Cricketers' Almanack in 1993 indicates that there was friction between Rochford and the Gloucestershire committee.

From 1975 to 1977, Rochford was on the umpires' list for first-class and List A matches in England and Wales. He also coached cricket and was a writer and journalist on cricket too. He collapsed and died suddenly in a pub in Stroud, but was also suffering from cancer at the time.
