= Arthur Penduck =

English cricketer

Personal information
- Full name: Arthur Edward Penduck
- Born: 1883; Thornbury, Gloucestershire, England
- Died: 5 December 1924 (aged 41); Kingsdown, Bristol, England
- Batting: Right-handed
- Bowling: Right-arm fast

Domestic team information
- Years: Team
- 1908–1909: Gloucestershire

Career statistics
Competition	First-class
Matches	5
Runs scored	18
Batting average	2.57
100s/50s	–/–
Top score	8
Balls bowled	516
Wickets	6
Bowling average	49.00
5 wickets in innings	–
10 wickets in match	–
Best bowling	3/98
Catches/stumpings	–/–
- Source: Cricinfo, 6 May 2012

Arthur Edward Penduck (1883 – 5 December 1924) was an English cricketer. Penduck was a right-handed batsman who bowled right-arm fast. He was born at Thornbury, Gloucestershire, where he was christened on 11 September 1883.

Penduck made his first-class debut for Gloucestershire against Essex in the 1908 County Championship. He made four further first-class appearances for the county, the last of which came against Surrey in the 1909 County Championship. In his five first-class appearances for the county, he took a total of 6 wickets at an average of 49.00, with best figures of 3/98. With the bat, he scored 18 runs at a batting average of 2.57, with a high score of 8.

He died at Kingsdown, Bristol, on 5 December 1924.
