= Norman Hobbs =

English cricketer

Personal information
- Full name: Norman Frederick Charles Hobbs
- Born: 17 October 1900; Cheltenham, Gloucestershire, England
- Died: 6 April 1966 (aged 65); Weston, Somerset, England
- Batting: Unknown

Domestic team information
- Years: Team
- 1924: Gloucestershire

Career statistics
| Competition | First-class |
|---|---|
| Matches | 6 |
| Runs scored | 53 |
| Batting average | 5.88 |
| 100s/50s | –/– |
| Top score | 28 |
| Balls bowled | – |
| Wickets | – |
| Bowling average | – |
| 5 wickets in innings | – |
| 10 wickets in match | – |
| Best bowling | – |
| Catches/stumpings | 5/– |
- Source: Cricinfo, 7 July 2012

Norman Frederick Charles Hobbs (17 October 1900 – 6 April 1966) was an English cricketer. Hobbs' batting style is unknown. He was born at Cheltenham, Gloucestershire.

Hobbs made his first-class debut for Gloucestershire against Sussex at Greenbank, Bristol, in the 1924 County Championship. He made five further first-class appearances for the county in 1924, the last of which came against Leicestershire at Aylestone Road, Leicester. In his six first-class matches, he scored 53 runs at an average of 5.88, with a high score of 28.

He died at Weston, Somerset, on 6 April 1966.
