= Charles King-Turner =

English cricketer

Personal information
- Full name: Charles John King-Turner
- Born: 13 April 1904; Cirencester, Gloucestershire, England
- Died: 4 April 1972 (aged 67); Cirencester, Gloucestershire, England
- Batting: Right-handed

Domestic team information
- Years: Team
- 1922: Gloucestershire

Career statistics
Competition	First-class
Matches	6
Runs scored	29
Batting average	3.22
100s/50s	–/–
Top score	10
Balls bowled	–
Wickets	–
Bowling average	–
5 wickets in innings	–
10 wickets in match	–
Best bowling	–
Catches/stumpings	3/–
- Source: Cricinfo, 27 January 2011

Dr. Charles John King-Turner (3 December 1904 – 4 April 1972) was an English cricketer. King-Turner was a right-handed batsman. He was born at Cirencester, Gloucestershire.

Educated at Cheltenham College, where he played for the Cheltenham XI, King-Turner made his first-class debut for Gloucestershire against Essex in the 1922 County Championship. He played 5 further first-class fixtures in that season, playing his final first-class fixture against Leicestershire at Greenbank, Bristol. King-Turner was an inconsistent, scoring just 29 runs in his 6 matches at a batting average of 3.22 and a high score of 10.

In 1927, King-Turner is mentioned in The London Gazette in March 1927 as a University Candidate for the rank of 2nd Lieutenant in the Officers' Training Corps. He died in Cirencester on 4 April 1972.
