= Frank Wicks =

English cricketer

Frank Wicks (30 January 1892 – 26 April 1965) was an English cricketer. He was a wicket-keeper who played for Gloucestershire. He was born in Bristol and died in Ham Green, Somerset.

Wicks made a single first-class appearance for the team, during the 1912 season, against the touring South Africans. From the tailend, he scored 2 runs in the first innings in which he batted, and a duck in the second.
