= William McClintock (English cricketer) =

English cricketer

Personal information
- Born: 7 March 1896; Jesmond, Newcastle upon Tyne
- Died: 30 March 1946 (aged 50); Bow, London
- Batting: Right-handed

Domestic team information
- Years: Team
- 1920-1921: Gloucestershire
- Source: Cricinfo, 26 March 2014

William McClintock (7 March 1896 – 30 March 1946) was an English cricketer. He played for Gloucestershire between 1920 and 1921.
