= Cyril Tyler =

English cricketer

Personal information
- Born: 26 January 1911; Ossett, Yorkshire, England
- Died: 25 January 1996 (aged 84); Reading, Berkshire, England
- Batting: Right-handed
- Role: Bowler

Domestic team information
- Years: Team
- 1936–1938: Gloucestershire

Career statistics
Competition	FC
Matches	16
Runs scored	113
Batting average
100s/50s
Top score
Balls bowled
Wickets	33
Bowling average
5 wickets in innings
10 wickets in match
Best bowling
Catches/stumpings
- Source: Cricinfo, 3 August 2013

Cyril Tyler (26 January 1911 – 25 January 1996) was an English academic and cricketer. He played for Gloucestershire between 1936 and 1938. He took 33 wickets, with his career best performance was 5 for 116 against Middlesex at Lord's. He started his career in the Heavy Woollen League in his native Ossett, Yorkshire, which led to speculation about a future selection in the England cricket team.

After retirement from cricket, Tyler transitioned into the academia as a professor of agricultural chemistry at Cirencester Agricultural College in 1939. He later became the Vice-Chancellor of Reading University in 1968, holding this role until his retirement in 1976. He was married to Rita Tyler.
