= Charles Margrett =

English cricketer

Personal information
- Full name: Charles Henry Margrett
- Born: 10 August 1862; Cheltenham, Gloucestershire, England
- Died: 22 November 1941 (aged 79); Cheltenham, Gloucestershire, England
- Batting: Unknown

Domestic team information
- Years: Team
- 1886: Gloucestershire

Career statistics
Competition	First-class
Matches	1
Runs scored	14
Batting average	7.00
100s/50s	–/–
Top score	14
Balls bowled	–
Wickets	–
Bowling average	–
5 wickets in innings	–
10 wickets in match	–
Best bowling	–
Catches/stumpings	–/–
- Source: Cricinfo, 28 January 2012

Charles Henry Margrett (10 August 1862 – 22 November 1941) was an English cricketer. Margrett's batting style is unknown. He was born at Cheltenham, Gloucestershire.

Margrett made a single first-class appearance for Gloucestershire against Sussex in 1886 at the County Ground, Hove. Gloucestershire made 147 in their first-innings, with Margrett scoring 14 runs before he was dismissed by Jesse Hide. In response, Sussex made 349 in their first-innings, which Gloucestershire responded to in their second-innings by making 219, during which Margrett was dismissed for a duck by Walter Humphreys. Needing just 18 to win, Sussex reached their target without losing a wicket. This was his only major appearance for Gloucestershire.

He died at the town of his birth on 22 November 1941.
