= William Simmonds (cricketer) =

English cricketer

Personal information
- Full name: William Henry Simmonds
- Born: 5 May 1892; Bristol, England
- Died: 11 March 1957 (aged 64); Bristol, England
- Batting: Right-handed
- Role: Batsman

Domestic team information
- Years: Team
- 1924–1925: Gloucestershire

Career statistics
Competition	FC
Matches	2
Runs scored	57
Batting average
100s/50s
Top score
Balls bowled
Wickets
Bowling average
5 wickets in innings
10 wickets in match
Best bowling
Catches/stumpings
- Source: Cricinfo, 4 August 2013

William Simmonds (5 May 1892 – 11 March 1957) was an English cricketer. He played two matches for Gloucestershire between 1924 and 1925.
