= Tom Dean (Gloucestershire cricketer) =

English cricketer

Thomas Henry Dean (1 April 1881, Colesbourne, Gloucestershire – 30 November 1964, Bath, Somerset) was an English cricketer who played for Gloucestershire.

Dean made a single first-class appearance for the team, during the 1908 season, against Surrey. Dean scored 11 runs in the first innings in which he batted, and 4 runs in the second, in a match curtailed to just a single day's play.
