= Richard Brooke (cricketer) =

English cricketer and clergyman

Personal information
- Full name: Richard Hubert John Brooke
- Born: 16 June 1909; Eton, Buckinghamshire, England
- Died: 3 March 1973 (aged 63); Great Canfield, Essex, England
- Batting: Right-handed
- Bowling: Right-arm medium

Domestic team information
- Years: Team
- 1933–1935: Minor Counties
- 1931–1932: Oxford University
- 1931: Free Foresters
- 1931: Gloucestershire
- 1929–1939: Buckinghamshire

Career statistics
Competition	First-class
Matches	18
Runs scored	1,043
Batting average	40.11
100s/50s	5/1
Top score	140
Balls bowled	598
Wickets	14
Bowling average	23.64
5 wickets in innings	–
10 wickets in match	–
Best bowling	3/7
Catches/stumpings	14/–
- Source: Cricinfo, 21 July 2011

Rev. Richard Hubert John Brooke (6 June 1909 – 3 May 1973) was an English cricketer and clergyman. Brooke was a right-handed batsman who bowled right-arm medium pace. He was born in Eton, then in Buckinghamshire.

He was educated at St Edward's School, Oxford, where he played for the school cricket team. Brooke had made his debut for Buckinghamshire in the Minor Counties Championship in 1929 against the Surrey Second XI. He later undertook studies at Oxford University. It was for Gloucestershire that he made his first-class debut for, incidentally against Oxford University Cricket Club. He batted once in this match, scoring 37 runs before being dismissed by Tuppy Owen-Smith. Immediately following this match, he made his only first-class appearance for the Free Foresters against Oxford University. Once more he batted just once in the match, scoring 27 runs before having his innings ended by Evelyn Wellings. He also took his maiden first-class wicket in this match, that of future South African Test cricketer Alan Melville. Having played against the university in 1931, he proceeded to make 2 appearances for the university in that same season, against the Army and Surrey. He played 11 further first-class matches for the university, all in 1932, with the last of them coming in the University Match against Cambridge University. A prolific batsman for the university, he scored 810 runs at an average of 45.00, with a highest score of 140. This score, one of four centuries he made, came against the Marylebone Cricket Club. With the ball, he took 9 wickets at a bowling average of 25.11, with best figures of 3/7.

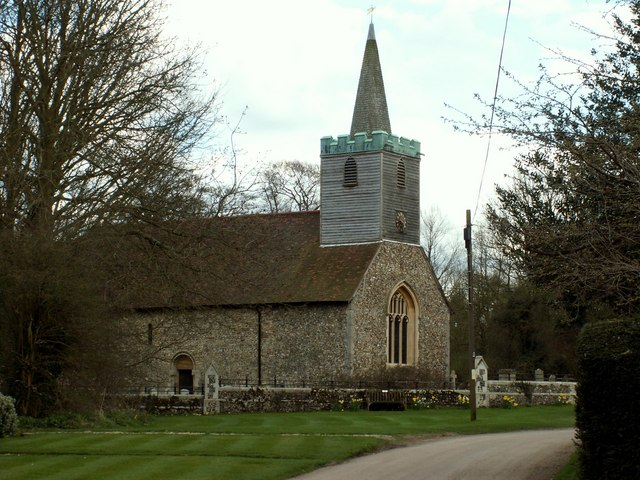
St. Mary's church, Great Canfield, where Brooke served as Rector from 1969 to 1973

While at Oxford, Brooke continued to play Minor counties cricket for Buckinghamshire, which was the case after he left Oxford. Playing for Buckinghamshire allowed him to play first-class cricket for the Minor Counties cricket team, who he made his debut for against Oxford University in 1933. He made 2 further first-class appearances for the team, against the touring West Indians in 1933, and the touring South Africans in 1935. In his 3 first-class matches for the team, he scored 169 runs at an average of 28.16, with a high score of 125. This score came against Oxford University in 1933, meaning all his first-class centuries came either for or against Oxford University. He also took 4 wickets for the Minor Counties, which came at an average of 9.50, with best figures of 3/11. Brooke continued to play for Buckinghamshire until 1939, making a total of 51 Minor Counties Championship appearances.

During his life he served as a master at Shrewsbury School for over 30 years, as well as a Rector at Great Canfield, Essex, a position he held from 1969 to his death in 1973.
