= Percy Hattersley-Smith =

English cricketer

Personal information
- Born: 19 May 1847; Cambridge
- Died: 19 January 1918 (aged 70); Cheltenham, Gloucestershire
- Batting: Right-handed

Domestic team information
- Years: Team
- 1878-1879: Gloucestershire
- Source: Cricinfo, 4 April 2014

Percy Hattersley-Smith (19 May 1847 – 19 January 1918) was an English cricketer. He played for Gloucestershire between 1878 and 1879.
