= Frank Troup =

English cricketer

Personal information
- Born: 27 September 1896; Mussoorie, India
- Died: 19 January 1924 (aged 27); Murray Bridge, South Australia
- Batting: Right-handed

Domestic team information
- Years: Team
- 1914-1921: Gloucestershire
- Source: Cricinfo, 29 March 2014

Frank Troup (27 September 1896 – 19 January 1924) was an English cricketer. He played for Gloucestershire between 1914 and 1921.
