= William Baillie (cricketer) =

English cricketer

William Baillie (12 November 1838 – 17 March 1895) was an English cricketer who played for Gloucestershire. He was born in Duntisbourne Abbots and died in Paddington.

Baillie made a single first-class appearance for the side, during the 1870 season, against Marylebone Cricket Club. From the lower-middle order, he scored 7 runs in the only innings in which he batted, as Gloucestershire won the match by an innings margin.
