= Frederick Goodwyn =

English cricketer

Frederick Wyldman Goodwyn (20 January 1850 – 23 April 1931) was an English first-class cricketer. He was a right-handed batsman who played mainly for Gloucestershire County Cricket Club from 1871 to 1873. Goodwyn was born at Calicut, Kerala, India.

Goodwyn made 3 first-class appearances, scoring 69 runs @ 23.00 with a highest innings of 38. He held no catches in his career and did not bowl.

Goodwyn died at St Leonards-on-Sea, Sussex on 23 April 1931.
