= Walter Brown (cricketer) =

Indian-born English cricketer

Walter Brown (31 July 1868 – 13 August 1954) was an Indian-born English cricketer. He was a right-handed batsman who played for Gloucestershire. He was born in the North-Western Provinces and died in Cheltenham.

Brown made a single first-class appearance for the side, during the 1895 season, against Surrey. He scored 8 runs in the first innings in which he batted, and 11 runs in the second, as Gloucestershire lost the match by an innings margin.
