= Cuthbert Kempe =

English cricketer

Personal information
- Full name: Cuthbert Reeves Kempe
- Born: 10 February 1856; Long Ashton, Somerset, England
- Died: 18 April 1953 (aged 97); Weston-super-Mare, Somerset, England

Domestic team information
- Years: Team
- 1877: Gloucestershire

Career statistics
Competition	FC
Matches	1
Runs scored	28
Batting average	9.33
100s/50s	–/–
Top score	15
Balls bowled	–
Wickets	–
Bowling average	–
5 wickets in innings	–
10 wickets in match	–
Best bowling	–
Catches/stumpings	1/–
- Source: Cricinfo, 1 December 2010

Cuthbert Reeves Kempe (10 February 1856 – 18 April 1953) was an English cricketer. Kempe's batting and bowling styles are unknown. He was born at Long Ashton, Somerset.

Kempe made 2 first-class appearances for Gloucestershire in 1877 against Surrey at The Oval and Sussex at the County Ground, Hove. In his 2 first-class matches, Kempe scored 28 runs at a batting average of 9.33, with a high score of 15. In the field he took a single catch.

He died in Weston-super-Mare, Somerset on 18 April 1953, aged 97.
