= Alfred Pontifex =

English cricketer

Alfred Pontifex (17 March 1842 – 25 August 1930) was an English first-class cricketer who made a single appearance for Gloucestershire County Cricket Club in 1871. Pontifex was born in London.

Pontifex made 1 first-class appearance, scoring 12 runs with a highest innings of 6 not out and held 1 catch. He did not bowl.

Pontifex died at Bath, Somerset on 25 August 1930.
