= Thomas Gregg =

English cricketer

Personal information
- Full name: Thomas Gregg
- Born: 18 April 1859; Wilford, Nottinghamshire
- Died: 20 March 1896 (aged 36); Wotton Vill, Gloucestershire
- Height: 6 ft 0 in (1.83 m)
- Batting: Right-handed
- Bowling: Right-arm fast
- Role: Bowler

Domestic team information
- Years: Team
- 1883: Somerset
- 1884–89: Gloucestershire

Career statistics
Competition	First-class
Matches	35
Runs scored	494
Batting average	8.98
100s/50s	0/1
Top score	62
Balls bowled	3,575
Wickets	55
Bowling average	28.00
5 wickets in innings	1
10 wickets in match	0
Best bowling	6/47
Catches/stumpings	23/–
- Source: CricketArchive, 27 August 2017

Thomas Gregg (18 November 1859 – 25 March 1938) was an English professional cricket player who played 35 first-class matches for Gloucestershire and Somerset in the 1880s. He was born in Nottinghamshire, where he had trials to play cricket, but he moved south after failing to make the county team. He was misused in his solitary match for Somerset in 1883, but his ability as a fast bowler was identified by Gloucestershire, and he played regularly there from 1884 until 1886. He made his final first-class appearance in 1889, finishing his career with 55 wickets. He died at the age of 36 after suffering general paralysis.

== Life and career ==
Gregg was born into a working-class family in Wilford, Nottinghamshire on 18 November 1859. His father worked as a farm hand, and later a miner, while his mother was a laundress. Possessing a strong physique, Gregg became a professional cricketer, and had trials at Nottinghamshire. He played in trial matches in both 1879 and 1880, but he failed to get into a strong Nottinghamshire team which was regularly vying for the title of Champion County during the 1880s. He moved into the south west of England, where he played for Newent Cricket Club. He was selected by Somerset for one match in 1883 for a match at Lord's against the Marylebone Cricket Club. MCC Scores and Biographies described him as a "hard and powerful hitter and a fast bowler". He was misused by Somerset, who played him as a batsman, and only brought him on as their fifth bowler; he took three wickets in the match, but only scored one run.

He did not play for Somerset again, and the next season he appeared for neighbouring county Gloucestershire. Used as an opening bowler by their captain, W. G. Grace, Gregg immediately provided a better return for his new county, collecting five wickets against Yorkshire. That 1884 season was Gregg's best; he claimed 21 wickets in first-class cricket at an average of 16.95, and took the only five-wicket haul of his career, when he took six wickets for the South in their annual fixture against the North. Though not much of a batsman, averaging just 8.98 in first-class cricket, Gregg did score one half-century when he reached 62 runs against Sussex in 1885. Gregg played regularly for Gloucestershire from 1883 until 1886, and then returned for one final match in 1889. He completed his first-class career with 55 wickets at an average of 28.00.

Gregg married Frances Alice Ford in 1883, and had three children. In 1894, at the age of 34, he was committed to the Gloucestershire County Lunatic Asylum after suffering general paralysis. Two years later, he died in the asylum on 20 March 1896. A benefit match was held for his wife and family at the County Ground, Bristol which raised £30.
