= William Boroughs =

English cricketer

Personal information
- Born: 30 December 1864; Cheltenham, Gloucestershire
- Died: 16 January 1943 (aged 78); Birmingham
- Batting: Right-handed

Domestic team information
- Years: Team
- 1899–1901: Gloucestershire
- Source: Cricinfo, 30 March 2014

William Boroughs (30 December 1864 – 16 January 1943) was an English cricketer. He played for Gloucestershire between 1899 and 1901.
