= John Nason =

English cricketer

John William Washington Nason (4 August 1889 – 26 December 1916) was an English cricketer active from 1906 to 1914 who played for Sussex and Gloucestershire. He was born in Tewkesbury and was killed at Vlamertinge, near Ypres, Belgium during the First World War. He appeared in 57 first-class matches as a righthanded batsman who bowled right arm slow. He scored 1,649 runs with a highest score of 139 and took ten wickets with a best performance of two for 24.

Nason was educated in Hastings and at Queens' College, Cambridge. During World War I he was commissioned as a captain in the Royal Sussex Regiment but transferred to the Royal Flying Corps in September 1916 with the rank of Flying Officer. His squadron flew reconnaissance missions in Nieuport 12 aircraft in the final stages of the Battle of the Somme. He was shot down and killed on 26 December 1916.
