= Frederick Bracher =

English cricketer

Personal information
- Full name: Frederick Charles Bracher
- Born: 25 October 1868; Bedminster, Bristol, England
- Died: 23 December 1947 (aged 79); Portishead, Somerset, England
- Batting: Unknown

Domestic team information
- Years: Team
- 1895–1897: Gloucestershire

Career statistics
Competition	First-class
Matches	13
Runs scored	163
Batting average	7.40
100s/50s	–/–
Top score	21
Balls bowled	–
Wickets	–
Bowling average	–
5 wickets in innings	–
10 wickets in match	–
Best bowling	–
Catches/stumpings	9/–
- Source: Cricinfo, 18 April 2014

Frederick Charles Bracher (25 October 1868 – 23 December 1947) was an English cricketer active in the late 1890s. Born at Bedminster, Bristol, Bracher made 13 first-class appearances for Gloucestershire.

Bracher made his first-class debut for Gloucestershire against Somerset in the 1895 County Championship at the Ashley Down Ground, Bristol, with him making six further appearances in that season. He made five appearances in the 1896 County Championship, before making a final appearance in 1897 against Yorkshire. A batsman of unknown handedness, Bracher scored a total of 163 runs in his thirteen first-class appearances, top-scoring with 21 and averaging just 7.40 per-innings.

He died at Portishead, Somerset on 23 December 1947.
