= Percival Winterbotham =

English cricketer

Personal information
- Full name: James Percival Winterbotham
- Born: 21 June 1883; Cheltenham, Gloucestershire
- Died: 2 December 1925 (aged 42); Cheltenham, Gloucestershire
- Batting: Left-handed

Domestic team information
- Years: Team
- 1902-1904: Gloucestershire
- Source: CricketArchive, 30 March 2014

James Percival Winterbotham (21 June 1883 – 2 December 1925) was an English cricketer. He played for Gloucestershire and Oxford University between 1902 and 1904. He was born and died in Cheltenham. Winterbotham was a left-handed batsman and a slow left-arm orthodox spinner.
