= William Nash (cricketer) =

English cricketer

Personal information
- Full name: William Wallace Hayward Nash
- Born: 22 September 1884; Quedgeley, Gloucestershire, England
- Died: 24 July 1971 (aged 86); Minchinhampton, Gloucestershire, England
- Batting: Unknown

Domestic team information
- Years: Team
- 1905–1906: Gloucestershire

Career statistics
Competition	First-class
Matches	3
Runs scored	81
Batting average	16.20
100s/50s	0/0
Top score	34
Catches/stumpings	1/–
- Source: Cricinfo, 1 April 2012

William Wallace Hayward Nash (22 September 1884 – 24 July 1977) was an English cricketer. Nash's batting style is unknown. He was born at Quedgeley, Gloucestershire.

Nash made his first-class debut for Gloucestershire against Cambridge University in 1905. He made two further first-class appearances for the county, both in the 1906 County Championship, against Kent and Sussex. In his three first-class matches for Gloucestershire, he scored a total of 81 runs at an average of 16.20, with a high score of 34.

He died at Minchinhampton, Gloucestershire, on 24 July 1971.
