= Richard Whiley =

English cricketer (1935–2026)

Personal information
- Full name: Richard Kingscote Whiley
- Born: 10 October 1935; Gloucester, Gloucestershire, England
- Died: 24 July 2026 (aged 90); Sydney, New South Wales, Australia
- Batting: Right-handed

Domestic team information
- Years: Team
- 1964–1967: Dorset
- 1958: Oxford University
- 1954: Gloucestershire

Career statistics
Competition	First-class
Matches	2
Runs scored	17
Batting average	8.50
100s/50s	–/–
Top score	7*
Balls bowled	–
Wickets	–
Bowling average	–
5 wickets in innings	–
10 wickets in match	–
Best bowling	–
Catches/stumpings	–/–
- Source: Cricinfo, 21 November 2011

Richard Kingscote Whiley (10 October 1935 – 24 July 2026) was an English cricketer. Whiley was a right-handed batsman. He was born in Gloucester, Gloucestershire and educated at Malvern College.

Whiley made a single first-class appearance for Gloucestershire against the touring Pakistanis at the College Ground, Cheltenham in 1954. In this match he batted twice, scoring 7 not out and 4 not out, in what was a drawn match. This was his only major appearance for Gloucestershire. Four years later, while studying at Brasenose College, Oxford, he made a single first-class appearance for Oxford University Cricket Club against Lancashire at University Parks, Oxford. In the Oxford first-innings, Whiley was dismissed for 4 runs by Roy Tattersall, while in their second-innings he was dismissed for 2 runs by the same bowler, with a low scoring encounter ending in a draw.

In 1964, Whiley made his debut for Dorset in the Minor Counties Championship against Wiltshire. He played Minor counties cricket for Dorset from 1964 to 1967, making a total of 36 Minor Counties Championship appearances.

Whiley was a schoolmaster at Clifton College and then moved to Australia as a history and economics teacher at Sydney Church of England Grammar School (Shore School) between 1968 and 1990. He died at Hornsby Hospital on 24 July 2026.
