= William Mirehouse =

English cricketer

William Mirehouse (29 October 1844 – 16 June 1925) was an English cricketer. He was a right-handed batsman who played for Gloucestershire. He was born and died in Bristol.

Mierhouse made a single first-class appearance for the team, during the 1872 season, against Sussex. Mirehouse did not bat or bowl in the match.
