= Hubert Boughton =

English rugby union player and cricketer

Personal information
- Born: 11 October 1858; Westbury-on-Severn, Gloucestershire
- Died: 26 March 1902 (aged 43)
- Batting: Right-handed

Domestic team information
- Years: Team
- 1884-1888: Gloucestershire
- Source: Cricinfo, 1 April 2014

Hubert James Boughton (11 October 1858 – 26 March 1902) was an English rugby union player and cricketer. He played rugby union for Gloucester between 1875 and 1886. He played cricket for Gloucestershire between 1884 and 1888.
