= Malcolm Pooley =

English cricketer (born 1969)

Personal information
- Full name: Malcolm William Pooley
- Born: 27 July 1969 (age 57); Truro, Cornwall, England
- Batting: Right-handed
- Bowling: Right-arm medium-pace
- Role: Bowler

Domestic team information
- Years: Team
- 1988–1990: Gloucestershire

Career statistics
Competition	FC	List A
Matches	12	24
Runs scored	155	8
Batting average	15.50	10.00
100s/50s	0/0	0/0
Top score	38	8
Balls bowled	1078	983
Wickets	15	24
Bowling average	37.60	29.16
5 wickets in innings	0	0
10 wickets in match	0	0
Best bowling	4/80	3/37
Catches/stumpings	4/0	3/0
- Source: Cricinfo, 29 July 2013

Malcolm Pooley (born 27 July 1969) is an English former cricketer. He played for Gloucestershire between 1988 and 1990.
