= Edward Gurney (cricketer) =

English cricketer

Edward Gurney (16 April 1868 – 17 June 1938) was an English cricketer who played for Gloucestershire. He was born in Wriddenham and died in Hove.

Gurney made a single first-class appearance for the team, at the age of 43, in the 1911 season, against Cambridge University. From the opening order, he scored 2 runs in the first innings in which he batted, and 8 runs in the second.
