= Reginald Hewlett =

English cricketer

Personal information
- Born: 12 August 1885; Bristol
- Died: 7 May 1950 (aged 64); Bristol
- Batting: Right-handed

Domestic team information
- Years: Team
- 1909-1922: Gloucestershire
- Source: Cricinfo, 30 March 2014

Reginald Hewlett (12 August 1885 – 7 May 1950) was an English cricketer. He played for Gloucestershire between 1909 and 1922.
