= Vivian Robinson =

English cricketer

Personal information
- Born: 16 May 1897; Bristol, England
- Died: 28 February 1979 (aged 81); Warminster, Wiltshire
- Batting: Right-handed

Domestic team information
- Years: Team
- 1923: Gloucestershire
- Source: Cricinfo, 26 March 2014

Vivian Robinson (16 May 1897 – 28 February 1979) was an English cricketer. He played for Gloucestershire in 1923.
