= George de Winton =

English cricketer (1869–1930)

George Seaton de Winton (5 September 1869 – 28 June 1930) was an English cricketer active from 1890 to 1901 who played for Gloucestershire. He was born in Clifton, Bristol and died in Froxfield, Wiltshire. He appeared in 28 first-class matches as a lefthanded batsman, scoring 669 runs with a highest score of 80 and held 13 catches.
