= Stephen Williams (cricketer, born 1954) =

English cricketer (born 1954)

Stephen Williams (born 11 March 1954) is an English cricketer. He was a right-handed batsman and leg-break bowler who played for Gloucestershire. He was born in Rodbourne Cheney.

Williams made a single first-class appearance for the team, during the 1978 season. In the only innings in which he batted, he scored a duck.

Williams made two List A appearances for Wiltshire between 1989 and 1990. He scored a duck on his debut, and 11 runs in his second match.
