= George Romans =

English cricketer and rugby union player

Personal information
- Full name: George Romans
- Born: 30 November 1876; Gloucester, Gloucestershire, England
- Died: 2 January 1946 (aged 69); Beaminster, Dorset, England
- Batting: Right-handed

Domestic team information
- Years: Team
- 1899–1903: Gloucestershire

Career statistics
Competition	First-class
Matches	11
Runs scored	218
Batting average	13.62
100s/50s	–/1
Top score	62
Balls bowled	–
Wickets	–
Bowling average	–
5 wickets in innings	–
10 wickets in match	–
Best bowling	–
Catches/stumpings	4/–
- Source: Cricinfo, 28 January 2012

George Romans (30 November 1876 – 2 January 1946) was an English cricketer and rugby union player. Romans was a right-handed batsman. He was born in Gloucester, Gloucestershire. He played rugby for Gloucester between 1897 and 1907.

Romans made his first-class debut for Gloucestershire against Somerset in the 1899 County Championship. He made ten further first-class appearances for the county, the last of which came against Somerset in the 1903 County Championship. In his eleven first-class appearances for Gloucestershire, he scored a total of 318 runs, which came at an average of 13.62, with a high score of 62. This score was his only half century and came against London County in 1903.

He died at Beaminster, Dorset in 1946.
