= Ernest Dewfall =

English cricketer

Ernest Dewfall (12 August 1911 — 11 November 1982) was an English cricketer. He was a right-handed batsman and right-arm fast bowler who played for Gloucestershire. He was born in Long Ashton and died in Cleeve.

Dewfall made two first-class appearances for the side during the 1938 season. In his debut, against Surrey, he scored a duck in the only innings in which he batted, and took a single wicket with the ball, that of Eddie Watts.

Dewfall's second and final first-class appearance came against Nottinghamshire, in which, once again, he scored a duck in the only innings in which he batted, though he took three wickets with the ball, including that of Test cricketer Walter Keeton.
