= Robert Mackenzie (cricketer) =

English cricketer

Personal information
- Full name: Robert Theodore Hope Mackenzie
- Born: 8 October 1886; Poona, Bombay Presidency, India
- Died: 20 March 1934 (aged 47); New Delhi, India
- Batting: Right-handed
- Bowling: Right-arm fast

Domestic team information
- Years: Team
- 1907: Gloucestershire
- 1907–1908: Cambridge University
- 1905–1906: Devon

Career statistics
Competition	First-class
Matches	4
Runs scored	38
Batting average	5.42
100s/50s	–/–
Top score	21
Balls bowled	110
Wickets	3
Bowling average	28.00
5 wickets in innings	–
10 wickets in match	–
Best bowling	2/30
Catches/stumpings	2/–
- Source: Cricinfo, 20 March 2011

Robert Theodore Hope Mackenzie (8 October 1886 – 20 March 1934) was an English cricketer born in Poona, India. Mackenzie was a right-handed batsman who bowled right-arm fast.

MacKenzie was educated at Cheltenham College, where he played for the college cricket team from 1903 to 1906. In 1905, he made his Minor Counties Championship debut for Devon against Glamorgan. The following season he played his second and final match for Devon, against Dorset. In 1907, he made his first-class debut for Cambridge University against Lancashire. In the same season he played two County Championship matches for Gloucestershire against Northamptonshire and Worcestershire, both played at the Spa Ground, Gloucester. In 1908, he played his second and final first-class match for Cambridge University against the Marylebone Cricket Club.

He died in New Delhi on 20 March 1934.
