= Arthur Lamb =

English cricketer

Personal information
- Full name: Arthur Lamb
- Born: 17 December 1868; Cheltenham, Gloucestershire, England
- Died: 26 July 1908 (aged 39); Cliftonville, Kent, England
- Batting: Unknown
- Bowling: Unknown

Domestic team information
- Years: Team
- 1957: Lancashire

Career statistics
Competition	First-class
Matches	2
Runs scored	24
Batting average	6.00
100s/50s	–/–
Top score	10
Balls bowled	20
Wickets	–
Bowling average	–
5 wickets in innings	–
10 wickets in match	–
Best bowling	–
Catches/stumpings	–/–
- Source: Cricinfo, 12 October 2011

Arthur Lamb (17 December 1868 – 26 July 1908) was an English cricketer. Lamb's batting and bowling styles are unknown. He was born at Cheltenham, Gloucestershire.

He made two first-class appearances for Gloucestershire. The first of these came against Yorkshire in the 1895 County Championship. His second appearance was against Lancashire in the 1896 County Championship. Lamb had little success in either match, scoring 24 runs and taking no wickets.

He died at Cliftonville, Kent on 26 July 1908.
