= Albert North =

English cricketer

Personal information
- Full name: Albert Edward Charles North
- Born: 20 December 1877; Bedminster, Bristol, England
- Died: 4 June 1933 (aged 55); Bristol, England
- Batting: Unknown
- Bowling: Right-arm fast
- Role: Bowler

Domestic team information
- Years: Team
- 1903–1909: Somerset
- 1912: Gloucestershire
- First-class debut: 21 May 1903 Somerset v Yorkshire
- Last First-class: 19 June 1912 Gloucestershire v Yorkshire

Career statistics
Competition	First-class
Matches	17
Runs scored	182
Batting average	12.13
100s/50s	–/–
Top score	30*
Balls bowled	1392
Wickets	25
Bowling average	37.16
5 wickets in innings	–
10 wickets in match	–
Best bowling	4/47
Catches/stumpings	6/–
- Source: CricketArchive, 8 February 2011

Albert Edward Charles North (20 December 1877 – 4 June 1933) played first-class cricket for Somerset and Gloucestershire between 1903 and 1912. He was born at Bedminster, Bristol and died at Bristol too.

North was a tail-end batsman and a right-arm fast bowler who made 15 appearances for Somerset scattered across a seven-year period from 1903 to 1909. He then reappeared for two matches for Gloucestershire without success in 1912. His best bowling came when playing for Somerset against Gloucestershire in 1904, with four wickets for 47 runs in 20 overs. Four years later, again for Somerset against Gloucestershire, he almost matched that with four for 48. He batted regularly at No 11 and it is not known whether he was right-handed or left-handed for batting: however, he made runs on occasion and against Sussex in 1908, after Somerset had been 75 for eight wickets, his unbeaten 30 enabled the team to reach 200, and was his highest first-class score.
