= Simon Wootton =

English cricketer (born 1959)

Simon Howard Wootton (born 24 February 1959) is an English former first-class cricketer who played for Warwickshire between 1981 and 1983, and for Gloucestershire in 1984. He also played List A cricket for Warwickshire.
