= Frederick Weaver =

English cricketer

Personal information
- Full name: Frederick Charles Weaver
- Born: 10 March 1878; Gloucester, Gloucestershire, England
- Died: 29 December 1949 (aged 71); Limpley Stoke, Wiltshire, England
- Batting: Right-handed

Domestic team information
- Years: Team
- 1897–1909: Gloucestershire

Career statistics
Competition	First-class
Matches	5
Runs scored	31
Batting average	4.42
100s/50s	0/0
Top score	18*
Balls bowled	337
Wickets	8
Bowling average	22.12
5 wickets in innings	1
10 wickets in match	0
Best bowling	5/63
Catches/stumpings	2/–
- Source: Cricinfo, 5 September 2012

Frederick Charles Weaver (10 March 1878 – 29 December 1949) was an English cricketer. Weaver's batting and bowling styles are unknown. He was born at Gloucester, Gloucestershire.

Weaver made his first-class debut for Gloucestershire against Yorkshire in the 1897 County Championship. He next played first-class cricket for the county in the 1900 County Championship, making two appearances against Nottinghamshire and Essex. He made a further first-class appearance in the 1901 County Championship against Yorkshire, before making a final first-class appearance in the 1909 County Championship against Northamptonshire. In his five matches, he took 8 wickets at a bowling average of 22.12, with best figures of 5/63, which came against Nottinghamshire. With the bat, he scored 31 runs at an average of 4.42, with a high score of 18 not out. After the War he was captain of Lloyd's Bank CC, Bournemouth topping both batting and bowling averages. Despite his moderate first class returns it was reported that he had exceeded 20,000 career runs in all cricket.

He died at Limpley Stoke, Wiltshire, on 29 December 1949.
