= Harry Jefferies =

English cricketer

Personal information
- Born: 1891; Bristol, England
- Died: Unknown

Domestic team information
- Years: Team
- Gloucestershire

Harry Jefferies (1891 - ????) was an English cricketer notable for his two first-class cricket appearances for Gloucestershire County Cricket Club in 1919. A bowler of unknown style and handedness, Jefferies took five wickets - all of them during just one of his two games - at a bowling average of 18.60 runs per wicket. He batted four times without scoring a run.

Born in Bristol, Jefferies made his debut in the County Championship on 23 May against Sussex in Gloucester. He took three wickets for the cost of 38 runs in the first innings, and two for fifty-five runs in the second as Gloucestershire took a twenty-four run victory. He did not bowl in his second match, against Yorkshire on 26 May.
