= Bernard Bloodworth =

English cricketer

Personal information
- Full name: Bernard Sydney Bloodworth
- Born: 13 December 1893; Cheltenham, Gloucestershire, England
- Died: 19 February 1967 (aged 73); Bristol, England
- Batting: Left-handed
- Role: Wicketkeeper-batsman

Domestic team information
- Years: Team
- 1919–1932: Gloucestershire

Career statistics
Competition	First-class
Matches	142
Runs scored	3,714
Batting average	16.28
100s/50s	1/16
Top score	115
Balls bowled	91
Wickets	0
Bowling average	–
5 wickets in innings	0
10 wickets in match	0
Best bowling	–
Catches/stumpings	74/27
- Source: Cricinfo, 1 July 2023

Bernard Sydney Bloodworth (13 December 1893 – 19 February 1967) was an English cricketer. He played for Gloucestershire between 1919 and 1932.

A middle- and lower-order batsman who often kept wicket, Bloodworth was a natural hitter whose attacking approach often led to his dismissal. He made 115, his only century, against Essex in May 1925.

After retiring from playing, Bloodworth served as a scorer for Gloucestershire. He became Gloucestershire's head groundsman from 1950 until his retirement in 1965. He died in 1967 at the age of 73.
