= Lambert Roberts =

English cricketer

Personal information
- Born: 13 March 1878; Twickenham, Middlesex
- Died: 26 June 1919 (aged 41); Sekondi, Gold Coast
- Batting: Right-handed

Domestic team information
- Years: Team
- 1900: Gloucestershire
- Source: Cricinfo, 30 March 2014

Lambert Roberts (13 March 1878 – 26 June 1919) was an English cricketer. He played two matches for Gloucestershire in 1900.
