= Ernest Ford (cricketer) =

English cricketer

Personal information
- Full name: Ernest Claudius Bramhall Ford
- Born: 23 July 1855; Cheltenham, Gloucestershire, England
- Died: 19 June 1900 (aged 44); Southend-on-Sea, Essex, England
- Batting: Right-handed
- Role: Wicket-keeper

Domestic team information
- Years: Team
- 1874–1875: Gloucestershire

Career statistics
Competition	First-class
Matches	6
Runs scored	75
Batting average	10.75
100s/50s	–/–
Top score	32*
Balls bowled	–
Wickets	–
Bowling average	–
5 wickets in innings	–
10 wickets in match	–
Best bowling	–
Catches/stumpings	3/1
- Source: Cricinfo, 5 August 2012

Ernest Claudius Bramhall Ford (23 July 1855 – 19 June 1900) was an English cricketer. Ford was a right-handed batsman who fielded as a wicket-keeper. He was born at Cheltenham, Gloucestershire, and was educated a Clifton College.

Ford made his first-class debut for Gloucestershire against Surrey at The Oval in 1874. He made five further first-class appearances for the county, the last of which came against Sussex in 1875 at the County Ground, Hove. In his six first-class matches, he scored a total of 75 runs at an average of 10.71, with a high score of 32 not out.

He died at Southend-on-Sea, Essex, on 19 June 1900.
