= Burnet James =

English cricketer

Burnet James (26 October 1886 – 26 September 1915) was an English cricketer. He was a left-handed batsman and left-arm slow bowler who played for Gloucestershire. He was born in Stoke Bishop, Bristol and died in Langemark.

James made three first-class appearances for the team during the 1914 season, scoring an innings-best 10 runs on his debut against Warwickshire.

All three of James' first-class appearances finished in defeat for Gloucestershire.

James was with the Royal Field Artillery and Royal Flying Corps during World War I and died in Belgium at the age of 28.
