= Hylton Jessop =

English cricketer

Personal information
- Born: 12 February 1868; Cheltenham, Gloucestershire
- Died: 19 July 1924 (aged 56); Cheltenham, Gloucestershire

Domestic team information
- Years: Team
- 1896: Gloucestershire
- Source: Cricinfo, 30 March 2014

Hylton Jessop (12 February 1868 – 19 July 1924) was an English cricketer. He played three matches for Gloucestershire in 1896.
