= Alfred Bewick =

English cricketer

Alfred Williams George Bewick (25 January 1876 – 15 October 1949) was an English cricketer. He was a left-handed batsman and left-arm fast bowler who played for Gloucestershire. He was born in Hempstead and died in Cheltenham.

Bewick made a single first-class appearance for the side, during the 1903 season, against Warwickshire. From the tailend, he scored a duck in the first innings in which he batted, and five runs in the second.

He picked up one wicket in the match, that of James Byrne.

== Sources ==
- Alfred Bewick's Cricinfo profile
- Alfred Bewick's CricketArchive profile
