= Thomas Gange =

English cricketer

Personal information
- Born: 15 April 1891; Pietermaritzburg, Colony of Natal
- Died: 11 July 1947 (aged 56); Swansea, Wales
- Batting: Right-handed

Domestic team information
- Years: Team
- 1913-1920: Gloucestershire
- Source: Cricinfo, 29 March 2014

Thomas Gange (15 April 1891 – 11 July 1947) was an English cricketer. He played for Gloucestershire between 1913 and 1920.
