= Clement Bengough =

English cricketer

Personal information
- Born: 14 January 1861; Bristol, England
- Died: 19 November 1934 (aged 73); Laramie, Wyoming, United States
- Batting: Right-handed

Domestic team information
- Years: Team
- 1880: Gloucestershire
- Source: Cricinfo, 1 April 2014

Clement Stuart Bengough (14 January 1861 – 19 November 1934), commonly called Ben, was an English cricketer. He played two matches for Gloucestershire in 1880. He was also a remittance man and a pioneer dude rancher.
