= Ernest Staddon =

English cricketer

Personal information
- Born: 2 December 1882; Westbury-on-Trym, Bristol
- Died: 23 July 1965 (aged 82); Bristol
- Batting: Right-handed

Domestic team information
- Years: Team
- 1912: Gloucestershire
- Source: Cricinfo, 29 March 2014

Ernest Staddon (2 December 1882 – 23 July 1965) was an English cricketer. He played for Gloucestershire in 1912.
