= Eric Wignall =

English cricketer

Personal information
- Full name: Eric William Edward Wignall
- Born: 25 December 1932; Harrow, Middlesex, England
- Died: 2 January 1991 (aged 58); Oxhey, Hertfordshire, England
- Batting: Right-handed
- Role: Bowler

Domestic team information
- Years: Team
- 1952–1953: Gloucestershire

Career statistics
Competition	FC
Matches	3
Runs scored	24
Batting average	8.00
100s/50s	0/0
Top score	14
Balls bowled	126
Wickets	2
Bowling average	31.50
5 wickets in innings	0
10 wickets in match	0
Best bowling	2/50
Catches/stumpings	2/0
- Source: Cricinfo, 3 August 2013

Eric Wignall (25 December 1932 – 2 January 1991) was an English cricketer. He played for Gloucestershire between 1952 and 1953.
