= Alec Winstone =

English cricketer

Alec Ethelbert Winstone
Personal information
- Born: 14 March 1879; Bristol
- Died: 29 March 1963 (aged 84); Bristol
- Batting: Right-handed

Domestic team information
- Years: Team
- 1906-1909: Gloucestershire
- Source: Cricinfo, 30 March 2014

Alec Ethelbert Winstone (14 March 1879 – 29 March 1963) was an English cricketer. He played in 44 first-class matches for Gloucestershire between 1906 and 1909 as a right-handed lower-order batsman and an occasional right-arm slow bowler.
