= Frederic Watts =

English cricketer

Personal information
- Born: 9 September 1884; Cinderford, Gloucestershire
- Died: 20 February 1968 (aged 83); Northampton
- Batting: Right-handed

Domestic team information
- Years: Team
- 1905: Gloucestershire
- Source: Cricinfo, 30 March 2014

Frederic Watts (9 September 1884 – 20 February 1968) was an English cricketer. He played one match for Gloucestershire in 1905.
