= William Meyer (cricketer) =

English cricketer

Personal information
- Full name: William Eustace Meyer
- Born: 12 December 1883; Redland, Bristol, England
- Died: 1 October 1953 (aged 69); Falmouth, Cornwall, England
- Batting: Right-handed
- Bowling: Right-arm fast-medium

Domestic team information
- Years: Team
- 1909–1910: Gloucestershire

Career statistics
Competition	First-class
Matches	9
Runs scored	136
Batting average	8.50
100s/50s	–/–
Top score	43
Balls bowled	–
Wickets	–
Bowling average	–
5 wickets in innings	–
10 wickets in match	–
Best bowling	–
Catches/stumpings	5/–
- Source: Cricinfo, 19 June 2012

William Eustace Meyer (12 January 1883 – 1 October 1953) was an English cricketer. Meyer was a right-handed batsman who bowled right-arm fast-medium. He was born at Redland, Bristol.

Meyer made his first-class debut for Gloucestershire against Kent in the 1909 County Championship at the Private Banks Sports Ground. He made eight further first-class appearances for the county, the last of which came against Middlesex in the 1910 County Championship at Lord's. In his nine matches for Gloucestershire, he scored 136 runs at an average of 8.50, with a high score of 43.

He died at Falmouth, Cornwall, on 1 October 1953.
