= Bernard Meakin =

English cricketer

Personal information
- Born: 5 March 1885; Stone, Staffordshire, England
- Died: 17 February 1964 (aged 78); Dunsfold, Surrey, England
- Batting: Left-handed

Domestic team information
- Years: Team
- 1906: Gloucestershire
- Source: Cricinfo, 30 March 2014

Bernard Meakin (5 March 1885 – 17 February 1964) was an English cricketer. He played eight matches of first-class cricket between 1906 and 1922.

Educated at Clifton College, Meakin was a left-handed batsman who played for Staffordshire from 1904 to 1922, captaining the team from 1911 to 1922. He was a member of the first Minor Counties composite team to play a first-class match, against the touring South Africans in 1912.

Meakin was a captain in the Royal Army Service Corps in the First World War, serving in France.
