= Edmund Marsden =

English cricketer and British Army officer

Personal information
- Born: 18 April 1881; Madras, British India
- Died: 26 May 1915 (aged 34); Myitkyina, Burma, British India
- Batting: Right-handed

Domestic team information
- Years: Team
- 1909: Gloucestershire
- Source: ESPNcricinfo, 30 March 2014

Edmund Marsden (18 April 1881 – 26 May 1915) was an English British Army officer and cricketer. He played for Gloucestershire in 1909.

== Military career ==
He was commissioned as a second lieutenant on the unattached list on 20 January 1900 "with a view to [his] appointment on the Indian Staff Corps". Posted to the Madras Command three months later, he was formally transferred to the Indian Staff Corps in april 1901, and served with the 19 Madras Infantry. He was promoted to lieutenant on 20 April 1902.
