= Francis Curteis =

English cricketer

Personal information
- Born: 26 June 1856; Bideford, Devon
- Died: 1 May 1928 (aged 71); Pembrokeshire, Wales
- Batting: Right-handed

Domestic team information
- Years: Team
- 1884: Gloucestershire
- Source: Cricinfo, 1 April 2014

Francis Curteis (26 June 1856 – 1 May 1928) was an English cricketer. He played six matches for Gloucestershire in 1884.
