= William Boughton (cricketer) =

English cricketer

Personal information
- Born: 23 December 1854; Westbury-on-Severn, Gloucestershire
- Died: 26 November 1936 (aged 81); Cardiff, Wales
- Batting: Right-handed

Domestic team information
- Years: Team
- 1879–1883: Gloucestershire
- Source: Cricinfo, 1 April 2014

William Boughton (23 December 1854 – 26 November 1936) was an English cricketer. He played for Gloucestershire between 1879 and 1883.
