= Christopher Trembath =

English cricketer

Personal information
- Full name: Christopher Richard Trembath
- Born: 27 September 1961 (age 65); Willesden, Middlesex, England
- Batting: Right-handed
- Bowling: Right-arm medium

Domestic team information
- Years: Team
- 1985–1991: Wiltshire
- 1982–1984: Gloucestershire

Career statistics
| Competition | FC | LA |
|---|---|---|
| Matches | 4 | 8 |
| Runs scored | 33 | 25 |
| Batting average | 33.00 | 5.00 |
| 100s/50s | –/– | –/– |
| Top score | 17* | 7 |
| Balls bowled | 578 | 271 |
| Wickets | 11 | 6 |
| Bowling average | 40.36 | 46.83 |
| 5 wickets in innings | 1 | – |
| 10 wickets in match | – | – |
| Best bowling | 5/91 | 3/31 |
| Catches/stumpings | 1/– | –/– |
- Source: Cricinfo, 11 October 2010

Christopher Richard Trembath (born 27 September 1961) is a former English cricketer. Trembath was a right-handed batsman who bowled right-arm medium pace. He was born in Willesden, Middlesex.

Trembath made his first-class debut for Gloucestershire against Oxford University in 1982. He then made his County Championship debut against Kent in the same season. He played two further first-class matches for the county against Middlesex and Essex, both in 1984. In his four first-class matches, he scored 33 runs at a batting average of 33.00, with a high score of 17*. With the ball, he took 11 wickets at a bowling average of 40.36, with a single five wicket haul of 5/91.

Trembath also made his debut in List A cricket for Gloucestershire. His debut List A match was against Nottinghamshire in the 1982 John Player League. From 1982 to 1984, he represented the county in eight List A matches, the last of which came against Essex.

Trembath moved to Wiltshire in 1985, where he made his debut for the county in the MCCA Knockout Trophy against Durham. From 1985 to 1990, he represented the county in six Trophy matches, the last of which came against Cornwall. He made his Minor Counties Championship debut for the county in 1986 against Dorset. From 1986 to 1991, he represented the county in 20 Minor Counties Championship matches, the last of which came against Oxfordshire. He also represented Wiltshire in a single List A match against Yorkshire in the 1987 NatWest Trophy. In his eight career List A matches, he scored 25 runs at an average of 5.00, with a high score of 7. With the ball he took 6 wickets at an average of 46.83, with best figures of 2/31.
