= Herbert Shrimpton =

English cricketer

Personal information
- Full name: Herbert John Donald Shrimpton
- Born: 12 April 1903; Worcester, Worcestershire, England
- Died: 12 March 1979 (aged 75); Southwark, London, England
- Batting: Right-handed
- Bowling: Leg break

Domestic team information
- Years: Team
- 1923: Gloucestershire

Career statistics
Competition	First-class
Matches	3
Runs scored	26
Batting average	5.20
100s/50s	–/–
Top score	14
Balls bowled	–
Wickets	–
Bowling average	–
5 wickets in innings	–
10 wickets in match	–
Best bowling	–
Catches/stumpings	1/–
- Source: Cricinfo, 6 July 2012

Herbert John Donald Shrimpton (12 April 1903 – 12 March 1979) was an English cricketer. Shrimpton was a right-handed batsman who bowled leg break. He was born at Worcester, Worcestershire, and attended the University of Bristol.

Shrimpton made his first-class debut for Gloucestershire against Middlesex in the 1923 County Championship at Lord's. Shrimpton made two further first-class appearances for the county in 1923, against Leicestershire at Aylestone Road, Leicester, and Yorkshire at Greenbank Cricket Ground, Bristol. In his three first-class matches, he scored 26 runs at an average of 5.20, with a high score of 14.

He died at Southwark, London, on 12 March 1979.
