= Wilson Tovey =

English cricketer

Personal information
- Born: 16 October 1874; Cirencester, Gloucestershire
- Died: 4 March 1950 (aged 75); Cirencester, Gloucestershire
- Batting: Right-handed

Domestic team information
- Years: Team
- 1901: Gloucestershire
- Source: Cricinfo, 30 March 2014

Wilson Tovey (16 October 1874 – 4 March 1950) was an English cricketer. He played one match for Gloucestershire in 1901.
