= Edward Milburn =

English cricketer (born 1967)

Personal information
- Full name: Edward Thomas Milburn
- Born: 15 September 1967 (age 59); Nuneaton, Warwickshire, England
- Batting: Right-handed
- Bowling: Right-arm medium

Domestic team information
- Years: Team
- 1990–1991: Gloucestershire
- 1987: Warwickshire

Career statistics
| Competition | First-class | List A |
|---|---|---|
| Matches | 6 | 10 |
| Runs scored | 86 | 43 |
| Batting average | 21.50 | 14.33 |
| 100s/50s | –/– | –/– |
| Top score | 35 | 21 |
| Balls bowled | 453 | 174 |
| Wickets | 5 | 4 |
| Bowling average | 61.40 | 46.50 |
| 5 wickets in innings | – | – |
| 10 wickets in match | – | – |
| Best bowling | 3/43 | 2/34 |
| Catches/stumpings | 2/– | 2/– |
- Source: Cricinfo, 30 July 2011

Edward Thomas Milburn (born 15 September 1967) is a former English cricketer. Milburn was a right-handed batsman who bowled right-arm medium pace. He was born in Nuneaton, Warwickshire.

Milburn made his first-class debut for Warwickshire against Hampshire in the 1987 County Championship. He made 2 further first-class appearances in 1987 for Warwickshire, against Somerset and Sussex. In his 3 first-class matches for the county, he scored 37 runs at an average of 18.50, with a highest score of 24. With the ball, he took 2 wickets at a bowling average of 64.00, with a best analysis of 1/26. He left Warwickshire at the end of the 1989 season.

He later joined Gloucestershire, making his first-class debut for against the touring Indians in 1990. He made 2 further first-class appearances for Gloucestershire, against Hampshire in the 1990 County Championship and Oxford University in 1991. In his 3 matches, Milburn scored 49 runs at an average of 24.50, with a highest score of 35. With the ball, he took 3 wickets at an average of 59.66, with best figures of 3/43. He made his List A debut for Gloucestershire in the 1990 Refuge Assurance League against Glamorgan. He made 9 further List A appearances, the last of which came against Lancashire in the 1991 Refuge Assurance League. In his 10 matches, he scored 43 runs at an average of 14.33, with a highest score of 21, while with the ball he took 4 wickets at an average of 46.50, with best figures of 2/34. Unable to perform consistently at the highest domestic level, Milburn was released by Gloucestershire at the end of the 1991 season.
