= George Holloway (cricketer) =

English cricketer

Personal information
- Born: 26 April 1884; Stroud, Gloucestershire
- Died: 22 September 1966 (aged 82); Cheltenham, Gloucestershire
- Batting: Left-handed

Domestic team information
- Years: Team
- 1908-1911: Gloucestershire
- Source: Cricinfo, 30 March 2014

George Holloway (26 April 1884 – 22 September 1966) was an English cricketer. He played for Gloucestershire between 1908 and 1911.
