= Walter Vizard =

English cricketer

Personal information
- Full name: Walter Oswald Vizard
- Born: 16 November 1861; Bellary, Madras Presidency, British Raj
- Died: 10 January 1929 (aged 67); Bayswater, London, England
- Batting: Right-handed
- Role: Wicket-keeper

Domestic team information
- Years: Team
- 1897: Hertfordshire
- 1882–1890: Gloucestershire

Career statistics
Competition	First-class
Matches	18
Runs scored	256
Batting average	8.53
100s/50s	–/–
Top score	49*
Balls bowled	–
Wickets	–
Bowling average	–
5 wickets in innings	–
10 wickets in match	–
Best bowling	–
Catches/stumpings	11/1
- Source: Cricinfo, 4 September 2011

Walter Oswald Vizard (16 November 1861 – 10 January 1929) was an English cricketer. Vizard was a right-handed batsman who fielded as a wicket-keeper. He was born in Bellary, Madras Presidency in the British Raj (today India). He was educated at Clifton College.

Vizard made his first-class debut for Gloucestershire against Middlesex in 1882. He made seventeen further first-class appearances for the county, the last of which came against Surrey in 1890. In his eighteen first-class matches, he scored 256 runs at an average of 8.53, with a high score of 49 not out. Behind the stumps he made 11 catches and made a single stumping.

By 1891, Vizard had moved to Hertfordshire and was enlisted in the 1st (Hertfordshire) Volunteer Battalion, the Bedfordshire Regiment as a 2nd lieutenant. He held the rank of lieutenant in 1895, in September of that year he was promoted to captain. By 1896, he was in partnership as a solicitor with a Charles Lothian Nicholson, son of General Lothian Nicholson, based in London, however in that year the partnership was dissolved by mutual consent. He was also in partnership as a solicitor with a Lionel Monk Smith, but this partnership too was dissolved by mutual consent in 1897. In 1897, he made a single appearance for Hertfordshire in the Minor Counties Championship against Norfolk. By 1902, he was in partnership with a Henry Theodore Monro, but the partnership was dissolved by mutual consent in that year.

He died in Bayswater, London on 10 January 1929.
