= Ricardo Williams (cricketer) =

English cricketer (born 1968)

Personal information
- Full name: Ricardo Cecil Williams
- Born: 3 February 1968 (age 58); Camberwell, London, England
- Batting: Right-handed
- Role: Bowler

Domestic team information
- Years: Team
- 1991–1995: Gloucestershire

Career statistics
Competition	FC	List A
Matches	26	33
Runs scored	453	297
Batting average	12.94	15.63
100s/50s	0/0	0/0
Top score	44	40
Balls bowled	3257	1219
Wickets	44	40
Bowling average	44.54	30.47
5 wickets in innings	0	0
10 wickets in match	0	0
Best bowling	4/28	4/51
Catches/stumpings	6/0	3/0
- Source: Cricinfo, 28 July 2013

Ricardo Cecil Williams (born 3 February 1968) is a former English cricketer. He played for Gloucestershire between 1991 and 1995. He also played Minor Counties cricket for Bedfordshire in 1996.
