= Herbert Timms =

English cricketer

Personal information
- Born: 6 July 1890; Moreton-in-Marsh, Gloucestershire
- Died: 1 March 1973 (aged 82); Eynsham, Oxfordshire
- Batting: Right-handed

Domestic team information
- Years: Team
- 1911-1912: Gloucestershire
- Source: Cricinfo, 29 March 2014

Herbert Timms (6 July 1890 – 1 March 1973) was an English cricketer. He played for Gloucestershire between 1912 and 1912.
