= Frederick Weeks =

English cricketer

Personal information
- Full name: Frederick James Weeks
- Born: 7 June 1903; Bristol, England
- Died: 20 February 1990 (aged 86); Wrington, Somerset, England
- Batting: Left-handed
- Role: Batsman

Domestic team information
- Years: Team
- 1925–1928: Gloucestershire

Career statistics
Competition	FC
Matches	7
Runs scored	122
Batting average
100s/50s
Top score
Balls bowled
Wickets
Bowling average
5 wickets in innings
10 wickets in match
Best bowling
Catches/stumpings
- Source: Cricinfo, 4 August 2013

Frederick Weeks (7 June 1903 – 20 February 1990) was an English cricketer. He played for Gloucestershire between 1925 and 1928.
