= Ernest Alderwick =

English cricketer

Personal information
- Born: 4 April 1886; Bristol, England
- Died: 26 August 1917 (aged 31); Péronne, Somme, France
- Batting: Right-handed

Career statistics
Competition	First-class
Matches	2
Runs scored	7
Batting average	2.33
100s/50s	0/0
Top score	5
Catches/stumpings	0/–
- Source: CricketArchive, 6 December 2022

Ernest Ewart Gladstone Alderwick (4 April 1886 – 26 August 1917) was an English cricketer who played as a right-handed batsman for Gloucestershire in 1908. He was born in Bristol and died in the First World War at Peronne on the Somme.

Alderwick made his debut as a lower-order batsman against Worcestershire, against whom he scored just seven runs in two innings, while his team went down to a 225-run defeat. He played in the next game, three days after his first and against Northamptonshire, but he scored a duck in his only innings before the match was abandoned for a draw. In 1914, he played a couple of Minor Counties games as an opening batsman for Suffolk.
