= Terence Riley (cricketer) =

English cricketer

Personal information
- Full name: Terence Michael Noel Riley
- Born: 25 December 1939 (age 86); Birmingham, Warwickshire, England
- Batting: Right-handed
- Bowling: Leg break

Domestic team information
- Years: Team
- 1964: Gloucestershire
- 1961–1964: Warwickshire

Career statistics
| Competition | First-class | List A |
|---|---|---|
| Matches | 23 | 1 |
| Runs scored | 678 | 14 |
| Batting average | 16.53 | 14.00 |
| 100s/50s | –/3 | –/– |
| Top score | 84 | 14 |
| Balls bowled | 12 | – |
| Wickets | – | – |
| Bowling average | – | – |
| 5 wickets in innings | – | – |
| 10 wickets in match | – | – |
| Best bowling | – | – |
| Catches/stumpings | 5/– | –/– |
- Source: Cricinfo, 13 May 2012

Terence Michael Noel Riley (born 25 December 1939) is a former English cricketer. Riley was a right-handed batsman who bowled leg break. He was born at Birmingham, Warwickshire.

Riley made his first-class debut for Warwickshire against Derbyshire in the 1961 County Championship. He made eleven further first-class appearances for the county, the last of which came against Cambridge University in 1964. An opening batsman, in his total of twelve first-class matches for the county, he scored 440 runs at an average of 20.95, with a high score of 84. This score was one of two half centuries he made for the county and came against on debut against Derbyshire.

Early in the 1964 season, Riley moved to Gloucestershire, making his first-class debut for the county against Hampshire in the 1964 County Championship. He made ten further first-class appearances for Gloucestershire, all in that season, with the last coming against his former county. In his eleven first-class matches for Gloucestershire, he scored a total of 238 runs at an average of 11.90, with a high score of 51. This score was his only half century for the county and came against Lancashire. He also made a single List A appearance for Gloucestershire in the 1964 Gillette Cup against Surrey, with him scoring 14 runs in the match before he was dismissed by David Sydenham.
