= Reginald Holloway =

English cricketer

Personal information
- Full name: Reginald Frederick Price Holloway
- Born: 31 October 1904; Dursley, Gloucestershire, England
- Died: 12 February 1979 (aged 74); Bristol, England
- Batting: Right-handed
- Role: Batsman

Domestic team information
- Years: Team
- 1923–1926: Gloucestershire

Career statistics
Competition	FC
Matches	7
Runs scored	108
Batting average
100s/50s
Top score
Balls bowled
Wickets
Bowling average
5 wickets in innings
10 wickets in match
Best bowling
Catches/stumpings
- Source: Cricinfo, 4 August 2013

Reginald Holloway (31 October 1904 – 12 February 1979) was an English cricketer. He played for Gloucestershire between 1923 and 1926.
