= Gilbert Wooley =

English cricketer

Personal information
- Full name: Gilbert George Wooley
- Born: 1 August 1896; Cheltenham, Gloucestershire
- Died: 8 February 1953 (aged 56); Gloucester, England
- Batting: Right-handed

Domestic team information
- Years: Team
- 1920: Gloucestershire
- Source: Cricinfo, 27 March 2014

Gilbert George Wooley (1 August 1896 – 8 February 1953) was an English cricketer. He played in a single first-class cricket game for Gloucestershire in 1920, but failed to score in either of his two innings.
