= Kenneth Soutar =

English cricketer

Personal information
- Born: 11 October 1888; Barnwood, Gloucester
- Died: 3 September 1914 (aged 25); Marylebone, London
- Batting: Right-handed

Domestic team information
- Years: Team
- 1908: Gloucestershire
- Source: Cricinfo, 30 March 2014

Kenneth Soutar (11 October 1888 – 2 September 1914) was an English cricketer. He played for Gloucestershire in 1908.
