= R. Horton (Gloucestershire cricketer) =

English cricketer

Personal information
- Full name: R. Horton
- Bowling: Slow left-arm orthodox

Domestic team information
- Years: Team
- 1925: Gloucestershire

Career statistics
Competition	First-class
Matches	3
Runs scored	13
Batting average	4.33
100s/50s	–/–
Top score	7
Balls bowled	390
Wickets	1
Bowling average	149.00
5 wickets in innings	–
10 wickets in match	–
Best bowling	1/97
Catches/stumpings	–/–
- Source: Cricinfo, 30 July 2011

R. Horton (full name and dates of birth and death unknown) was an English cricketer. Horton's batting style is unknown, but it is known he was a slow left-arm orthodox bowler.

Horton made his first-class debut for Gloucestershire against Lancashire in 1925. He made two further first-class appearances, both in 1925, against Nottinghamshire and Leicestershire. In his three first-class matches, he scored 13 runs at an average of 4.33, with a high score of 7. With the ball, he took just a single wicket.
