= Gilbert Rattenbury =

Welsh cricketer

Personal information
- Born: 28 February 1878; Cardiff, Wales
- Died: 14 August 1958 (aged 80); Penarth, Wales
- Batting: Right-handed

Domestic team information
- Years: Team
- 1902-1909: Gloucestershire
- Source: Cricinfo, 30 March 2014

Gilbert Rattenbury (28 February 1878 – 14 August 1958) was a Welsh cricketer. He played for Gloucestershire between 1902 and 1909.
