= Herbert Gribble =

English cricketer

Personal information
- Born: 23 December 1860; Bristol
- Died: 12 June 1943 (aged 82); Teddington, Middlesex
- Batting: Right-handed

Domestic team information
- Years: Team
- 1878-1882: Gloucestershire
- Source: Cricinfo, 1 April 2014

Herbert Gribble (23 December 1860 – 12 June 1943) was an English cricketer. He played for Gloucestershire between 1878 and 1882.
