= Thomas Matthews (English cricketer) =

English cricketer (1845–1932)

Thomas Gadd Matthews (9 December 1845 – 5 January 1932) was an English cricketer who played first-class cricket from 1870 to 1878 for Gloucestershire County Cricket Club, making 29 appearances. A right-handed batsman, he scored 769 runs with a highest score of 201. He made one century, 2 half-centuries and held 13 catches.
