= Lawrence Watts =

English cricketer

Personal information
- Full name: Lawrence Dursley Watts
- Born: 2 May 1935; Bristol, England
- Died: 26 August 1997 (aged 62); Crickhowell, Powys, Wales
- Batting: Right-handed
- Role: Batsman

Domestic team information
- Years: Team
- 1957–1958: Gloucestershire

Career statistics
Competition	FC
Matches	11
Runs scored	361
Batting average	18.05
100s/50s	0/2
Top score	69
Balls bowled
Wickets
Bowling average
5 wickets in innings
10 wickets in match
Best bowling
Catches/stumpings
- Source: Cricinfo, 1 August 2013

Lawrence Dursley Watts (2 May 1935 – 26 August 1997) was an English cricketer. He played for Gloucestershire between 1957 and 1958.
