= Theodore Fowler =

English cricketer

Personal information
- Full name: Theodore Humphrey Fowler
- Born: 25 September 1879; Cirencester, Gloucestershire
- Died: 17 August 1915 (aged 35); Epsom, Surrey
- Batting: Right-handed

Domestic team information
- Years: Team
- 1901–1914: Gloucestershire
- Source: Cricinfo, 30 March 2014

Theodore Humphrey Fowler (25 September 1879 – 17 August 1915) was an English cricketer. He played for Gloucestershire between 1901 and 1914. He died on active service as a lance corporal in the Honourable Artillery Company during World War I.
