= Wilfred Craddy =

English cricketer

Personal information
- Full name: Wilfred Hartland Craddy
- Born: 1 September 1905; Bristol, England
- Died: 4 January 1979 (aged 73); Westbury-on-Trym, Bristol, England
- Batting: Left-handed

Domestic team information
- Years: Team
- 1928: Gloucestershire

Career statistics
Competition	First-class
Matches	3
Runs scored	47
Batting average	9.40
100s/50s	–/–
Top score	29
Balls bowled	–
Wickets	–
Bowling average	–
5 wickets in innings	–
10 wickets in match	–
Best bowling	–
Catches/stumpings	–/–
- Source: Cricinfo, 18 March 2011

Wilfred Hartland Craddy (1 September 1905 – 4 January 1979) was an English cricketer, a left-handed batsman born in Bristol.

Craddy made his debut for Gloucestershire in the 1928 County Championship against Glamorgan. He paid two further first-class matches for Gloucestershire in 1928, against Sussex and Northamptonshire. In his three first-class matches, Craddy scored 47 runs at a batting average of 9.40, with a high score of 29.

He died in Westbury-on-Trym, Bristol on 4 January 1979.
