= Reginald Neal (cricketer) =

English cricketer

Reginald Neal (12 June 1910 – 2 October 1964) was an English cricketer. He was a wicket-keeper who played for Gloucestershire. He was born in Bedminster, Bristol and died in Boscombe, Bournemouth.

Neal made a single first-class appearance for the team, during the 1922 season, against Derbyshire. In the only innings in which he batted, he scored 2 not out.
