= George Robathan =

English cricketer

Personal information
- Born: 18 July 1878; Brighton, Sussex
- Died: 3 August 1951 (aged 73); Farnham, Surrey
- Batting: Right-handed

Domestic team information
- Years: Team
- 1922: Gloucestershire
- Source: Cricinfo, 26 March 2014

George Robathan (18 July 1878 – 3 August 1951) was an English cricketer. He played for Gloucestershire in 1922.
