= Charles Disney =

English cricketer

Charles Disney (21 November 1894 – 11 April 1963) was an English cricketer. He was a right-handed batsman and right-arm medium-fast bowler who played for Gloucestershire. He was born in Stourbridge and died in Linthorpe.

Disney made a single first-class appearance for the team, during the 1923 season, against Leicestershire. From the middle order, he scored 2 runs in the first innings in which he batted, and a duck in the second.
