= Thomas Toogood =

English cricketer

Personal information
- Full name: Thomas Hector Toogood
- Born: 29 December 1872; Clifton, Bristol, England
- Died: 23 September 1953 (aged 80); Stapleton, Bristol, England
- Batting: Right-handed
- Bowling: Right-arm slow-medium

Domestic team information
- Years: Team
- 1900–1914: Gloucestershire

Career statistics
Competition	First-class
Matches	8
Runs scored	30
Batting average	3.75
100s/50s	–/–
Top score	12
Balls bowled	1,013
Wickets	16
Bowling average	30.50
5 wickets in innings	1
10 wickets in match	–
Best bowling	6/115
Catches/stumpings	5/–
- Source: Cricinfo, 29 January 2012

Thomas Hector Toogood (29 December 1872 – 23 September 1953) was an English cricketer. Toogood was a right-handed batsman who bowled right-arm slow-medium. He was born at Clifton, Bristol.

Toogood made his first-class debut for Gloucestershire against Surrey in the 1900 County Championship. He played infrequently for the county, making seven further first-class appearances, the last of which came against Surrey in the 1914 County Championship. In his eight first-class appearances for Gloucestershire, Toogood took 16 wickets at an average of 30.50, with best figures of 6/115. These figures were his only five wicket haul and came against Surrey in his final first-class match in 1914. A poor batsman, Toogood scored just 30 runs at a batting average of 3.75, with a high score of 12.

He died at Stapleton, Bristol on 23 November 1953.
