= William Macpherson (cricketer) =

English cricketer

William Douglas Lawson Macpherson (15 May 1841 – 24 February 1920) was an English cricketer who played first-class cricket from 1870 to 1871 for Gloucestershire, and a school administrator. He was a right-handed batsman and an occasional wicket-keeper who made 3 first-class career appearances.

In 1864, Macpherson was appointed Secretary (also sometimes serving as Treasurer) of the Council of Clifton College, Bristol, and lived at Clifton. His sons- K. D. W. Macpherson (a Rear-Admiral in the Royal Navy), A. G. Macpherson (a schoolmaster at Newton Abbot College), and C. G. Macpherson (a solicitor)- were educated at Clifton College.
