= Guy Pedder =

English cricketer

Personal information
- Full name: Guy Richard Pedder
- Born: 7 July 1892; Brandiston, Norfolk, England
- Died: 6 April 1964 (aged 71); Hoxne, Suffolk, England
- Batting: Right-handed
- Role: Wicket-keeper
- Relatives: Humphrey Critchley-Salmonson (brother-in-law)

Domestic team information
- Years: Team
- 1925: Gloucestershire
- 1924: Minor Counties
- 1913–1931: Norfolk

Career statistics
| Competition | First-class |
|---|---|
| Matches | 5 |
| Runs scored | 120 |
| Batting average | 30.00 |
| 100s/50s | –/1 |
| Top score | 82 |
| Balls bowled | – |
| Wickets | – |
| Bowling average | – |
| 5 wickets in innings | – |
| 10 wickets in match | – |
| Best bowling | – |
| Catches/stumpings | 7/2 |
- Source: Cricinfo, 4 August 2013

Guy Richard Pedder (7 July 1892 – 6 April 1964) was an English cricketer active in the 1910s, 1920s and early 1930s. Born at Brandiston Hall in Brandiston, Norfolk, Pedder was a right-handed batsman who played as a wicket-keeper who played the majority of his cricket in minor counties cricket, though he did make five appearances in first-class cricket.

== Career ==
Educated at Repton School and later attending Trinity College, Oxford, Pedder made his debut in minor counties cricket for Norfolk against Cambridgeshire in the 1913 Minor Counties Championship, with him making a further appearance in that season against Glamorgan. In the following season, he appeared in three further Minor Counties Championship matches.
