= Leonard Day =

English cricketer

Personal information
- Born: 24 December 1859; York
- Died: 25 April 1943 (aged 83); Hornsey, Middlesex
- Batting: Right-handed

Domestic team information
- Years: Team
- 1880-1882: Gloucestershire
- Source: Cricinfo, 1 April 2014

Leonard Day (24 December 1859 – 25 April 1943) was an English cricketer. He played for Gloucestershire between 1880 and 1882.
