= Ronald Turner (cricketer) =

English cricketer (1885–1915)

Personal information
- Full name: Ronald Turner
- Born: 19 June 1885; Gillingham, Kent, England
- Died: 15 August 1915 (aged 30); Suvla Bay, Gallipoli, Ottoman Turkey
- Batting: Unknown

Domestic team information
- Years: Team
- 1906: Gloucestershire

Career statistics
Competition	First-class
Matches	3
Runs scored	30
Batting average	5.00
100s/50s	–/–
Top score	19
Balls bowled	–
Wickets	–
Bowling average	–
5 wickets in innings	–
10 wickets in match	–
Best bowling	–
Catches/stumpings	–/–
- Source: Cricinfo, 23 January 2013

Ronald Turner (19 June 1885 – 15 August 1915) was an English cricketer. Turner's batting style is unknown. He was also an amateur footballer.

Born at Gillingham, Kent, Turner was the son of the Reverend Robert Stobbs Turner and Catherine Mary Turner, living with his parents at Tewkesbury, Gloucestershire. He later attended Queens' College, Cambridge, where he gained a Blue in football and played for the England national amateur football team. In cricket, Turner made his first-class debut for Gloucestershire against Cambridge University at Fenner's in 1906. He then made two further first-class appearances in that seasons County Championship against Somerset and Surrey. He scored 30 runs at an average of 5.00, with a high score of 19. Turner later served in World War I with The Essex Regiment as a 2nd Lieutenant and saw action in the Landing at Suvla Bay by British XI Corps on 6 August 1915. He was killed in action during a night time patrol on 15 August, the last day of the landing.
