= Frank Rowlands =

English cricketer

Personal information
- Born: 26 July 1889; Bristol, England
- Died: 6 September 1975 (aged 86); Sydenham, London
- Batting: Right-handed

Domestic team information
- Years: Team
- 1920-1922: Gloucestershire
- Source: Cricinfo, 27 March 2014

Frank Rowlands (26 July 1889 – 6 September 1975) was an English cricketer. He played for Gloucestershire between 1920 and 1922.
