= George Wedel =

English cricketer

Personal information
- Born: 18 May 1900; Leigh, Lancashire, England
- Died: 16 April 1981 (aged 80); Amberley, Gloucestershire, England
- Batting: Left-handed
- Role: Bowler

Domestic team information
- Years: Team
- 1925–1929: Gloucestershire

Career statistics
Competition	FC
Matches	45
Runs scored	545
Batting average
100s/50s
Top score
Balls bowled
Wickets	51
Bowling average
5 wickets in innings
10 wickets in match
Best bowling
Catches/stumpings
- Source: Cricinfo, 4 August 2013

George Wedel (18 May 1900 – 16 April 1981) was an English cricketer. He played for Gloucestershire between 1925 and 1929.
