= Reggie Williams (cricketer) =

English cricketer (born 1969)

Richard Charles James ("Reggie") Williams (born 8 August 1969) is a former English cricketer. He was a left-handed batsman and wicket-keeper who played for Gloucestershire in 44 first-class matches in a career that spanned 1990 to 2001.

Having made his Second XI championship debut in 1988, where he participated in a three-day draw against Kent. He played in the second team for the next three years, until he appeared for Gloucestershire against Glamorgan in July 1990. He went without a batting or bowling appearance throughout the match, as the game was reduced to a single innings per side.

Appearing extensively throughout the second XI championship over the next seven years, he would wait until 2001 until he was able to get a regular first team place, as Jack Russell prevented him from claiming a place in the team. He retired from first-class cricket in 2001 having seen eleven years as a second-team wicket-keeper for a strong Gloucestershire side. He can now be found coaching rackets and cricket with Dr Waller at Clifton College.
