= Andrew Babington =

English cricketer (born 1963)

Personal information
- Full name: Andrew Mark Babington
- Born: 22 July 1963 (age 63); Marylebone, London, England
- Batting: Right-handed
- Role: Bowler

Domestic team information
- Years: Team
- 1986–1990: Sussex
- 1991–1994: Gloucestershire

Career statistics
Competition	FC	List A
Matches	95	127
Runs scored	515	143
Batting average
100s/50s
Top score
Balls bowled
Wickets	208	130
Bowling average
5 wickets in innings
10 wickets in match
Best bowling
Catches/stumpings
- Source: Cricinfo, 28 July 2013

Andrew Babington (born 22 July 1963) is a former English cricketer. He played for Sussex between 1986 and 1990 and for Gloucestershire between 1991 and 1994.

He took a hat-trick for Sussex in his debut season of 1986 in a match against Gloucestershire, his seam bowling capturing "his first championship wickets in dramatic style. He sent back Andy Stovold, and then in his fifth over dismissed Phil Bainbridge, Kevin Curran and Jeremy Lloyds with successive balls."

Three years later, Babington's pace bowling again had dramatic effect on a county game. He took 4 for 23 (match figures 9 for 60) as Lancashire faltered in a run chase against Sussex.

After five seasons at Sussex, Babington moved to Gloucestershire in 1991. In mid-June 1992, Babington took his career best figures of 8 for 107 in a match versus Kent.
