= Nick Finan =

English cricketer (born 1954)

Personal information
- Full name: Nicholas Hugh Finan
- Born: 3 July 1954 (age 72); Knowle, Somerset, England
- Nickname: Fines
- Batting: Right-handed
- Bowling: Right-arm medium-fast
- Role: Bowler

Domestic team information
- Years: Team
- 1975–1979: Gloucestershire

Career statistics
Competition	FC	List A
Matches	8	34
Runs scored	26	70
Batting average	13.00	6.36
100s/50s	0/0	0/0
Top score	18	13
Balls bowled	546	1419
Wickets	4	27
Bowling average	78.25	39.14
5 wickets in innings	0	0
10 wickets in match	0	0
Best bowling	2/57	2/25
Catches/stumpings	1/–	8/–
- Source: Cricinfo, 25 July 2021

Nick Finan (born 3 July 1954) is a former English cricketer. A right-arm medium-fast bowler, he played irregularly for Gloucestershire between 1975 and 1979.
