= Frank Luce (cricketer) =

English cricketer

Personal information
- Full name: Frank Mowbray Luce
- Born: 26 April 1878; Gloucester
- Died: 9 September 1962 (aged 84); Reading, Berkshire
- Batting: Right-handed
- Bowling: Left-arm

Domestic team information
- Years: Team
- 1901–1911: Gloucestershire

Career statistics
Competition	First-class
Matches	25
Runs scored	754
Batting average	18.39
100s/50s	0/3
Top score	57
Balls bowled	10
Wickets	0
Bowling average	–
5 wickets in innings	–
10 wickets in match	–
Best bowling	–
Catches/stumpings	19/–
- Source: ESPNcricinfo, 11 June 2014

Frank Mowbray Luce (26 April 1878 – 9 September 1962) was an English cricketer whose first-class cricket career spanned 25 matches for Gloucestershire County Cricket Club between 1901 and 1911. A right-handed batsman and occasional left-arm bowler of an unknown style, Luce scored 754 runs at a batting average of 18.39. He played in only three seasons – 1901, 1907 and 1911 – because of his career in the Indian Civil Service in Bengal.

Luce was born in Gloucester. He was educated at Cheltenham College and played cricket for his school. For his college he opened the bowling frequently, taking three wickets against Haverford College on 29 June 1896. He also scored 71 batting in the lower order against Marlborough College on 3 July, followed by a score of 90 against Clifton College on 8 July. He then took seven wickets across a match against Haileybury College in August, then another seven in a match against Liverpool Cricket Club in 1897.

His first-class career began in 1901 with two matches of the County Championship. His debut on 13 May against Nottinghamshire saw him make scores of zero and 28. He made two against Middlesex at Lord's Cricket Ground on 30 May, and did not play again until 1907.

He returned in June 1907 against Worcestershire and made his maiden half-century, scoring fifty exactly. He played 10 matches in total that year, scoring 295 runs at 19.66. He returned for 13 games in 1911, scoring 429 runs at 18.65 including two more half-centuries. He died in Reading, Berkshire in 1962.
