= Robert Green (cricketer) =

English cricketer

Robert Green (11 December 1894 — 13 September 1969) was an English cricketer who played for Gloucestershire. He was born in Chippenham and died in Pulverbatch. He also lived in Hove for several years.

Green made a single first-class appearance for the team, during the 1924 season, against Yorkshire. From the middle order, he scored 3 runs in the first innings in which he batted, and 2 runs in the second.
