= Sivell Lane =

English cricketer

Personal information
- Full name: Sivell Lane
- Born: 21 August 1881; Ledbury, Herefordshire, England
- Died: 10 February 1961 (aged 79); Toronto, Ontario, Canada
- Batting: Unknown
- Bowling: Unknown

Domestic team information
- Years: Team
- 1901: Gloucestershire

Career statistics
Competition	First-class
Matches	3
Runs scored	16
Batting average	4.00
100s/50s	–/–
Top score	8
Balls bowled	492
Wickets	7
Bowling average	42.28
5 wickets in innings	1
10 wickets in match	–
Best bowling	5/139
Catches/stumpings	2/–
- Source: Cricinfo, 28 October 2011

Sivell Lane (21 August 1881 – 10 February 1961) was an English cricketer. Lane's batting and bowling styles are unknown. He was born in Ledbury, Herefordshire.

Lane made his first-class debut for Gloucestershire against Surrey in the 1901 County Championship. He made two further first-class appearances in that season, against Worcestershire and Lancashire. In his three matches, he took 7 wickets at an average of 42.28, with best figures of 5/139. These figures came on debut against Surrey. With the bat, he scored just 16 runs at a batting average of 4.00, with a high score of 8.

He later moved to Canada, where he died at Toronto, Ontario on 10 February 1961.
