= John Halford =

English cricketer

John Halford (21 April 1846 – 1 April 1901) was an English cricketer who played first-class cricket from 1870 to 1874 for Gloucestershire. He was a right-handed batsman and wicket-keeper who made 10 career appearances. Halford scored 150 runs with a highest score of 42.
