= Harry Smith (cricketer, born 1891) =

English cricketer

Cricket information
- Batting: Right-handed

International information
- National side: England
- Only Test: 23 June 1928 v West Indies

Career statistics
Competition	Test	First-class
Matches	1	402
Runs scored	7	13,413
Batting average	7.00	22.35
100s/50s	0/0	10/75
Top score	7	149
Catches/stumpings	1/–	457/265
- Source: CricInfo, 7 November 2022

Harry Smith (21 May 1891 – 12 November 1937) was a cricketer who played for Gloucestershire and England.

Smith was a reliable wicket-keeper and a right-hand batsman good enough to make 1000 runs in a season five times in the 1920s. He first played for Gloucestershire in 1912 and took over as regular wicket-keeper from Jack Board in 1914. From then until 1931, he was a regular in the side, often batting at No 3 in a team perennially reliant for its runs on just a few players.

He played just one Test match, the first match ever against the West Indies at Lord's in 1928. He scored seven runs and took one catch, but made way in the next match for Harry Elliott, who in turn made way for George Duckworth for the third and final Test.

Smith missed the whole of the 1932 season through illness, prompting Wisden in 1933 to an unusual tribute in its usually emotion-free pages: "Smith's absence," it wrote, "meant something more than the loss of a thoroughly dependable wicket-keeper and a batsman capable of getting runs when runs were most needed, because, perhaps unconsciously, his fellow professionals had come to regard him as their father, and, in an unassuming way, he was a source of strength to his captain on the field. His value was equally marked in the dressing room and on the long journeys which continually had to be faced."

Smith did not appear in first-class cricket in 1933 or 1934, but in 1935, Gloucestershire having failed to find an adequate successor as wicket-keeper, he returned for 15 county matches, though he was ill and his batting was negligible. He died little over two years later.
