= Walter Jessop (cricketer) =

English cricketer

Personal information
- Born: 22 March 1899; Cheltenham, Gloucestershire
- Died: 25 December 1960 (aged 61); Gloucestershire
- Batting: Right-handed

Domestic team information
- Years: Team
- 1920-1921: Gloucestershire
- Source: Cricinfo, 26 March 2014

Walter Jessop (22 March 1899 – 25 December 1960) was an English cricketer. He played for Gloucestershire between 1920 and 1921.
