= Walter Heath (Gloucestershire cricketer) =

English cricketer

Walter Heath (20 January 1860 — 7 March 1937) was an English cricketer. He was a wicket-keeper who played for Gloucestershire. He was born in Tewkesbury and died in Evesham.

Heath made a single first-class appearance for the team, during the 1886 season, against Nottinghamshire. From the tailend, he scored a duck in the only innings in which he batted.
