= Howard Cleaton =

Welsh cricketer (born 1949)

Howard Cleaton (born 15 November 1949) was a Welsh cricketer. He was a right-handed batsman and right-arm off-break bowler who played for Gloucestershire. He was born in Merthyr Tydfil.

Having played for the team in the Second XI Championship between 1969 and 1972, Cleaton made a single first-class appearance for the side, during the 1971 season. In the only innings in which he batted, he scored 1 run.

Cleaton bowled 9 overs in the match, conceding 23 runs.
