= Kingsdown, Bristol =

Area of Bristol, England

Coordinates: 51.462°N 2.596°W

Kingsdown
- Location within Bristol
- OS grid reference: ST586739
- Unitary authority: Bristol
- Ceremonial county: Bristol
- Region: South West
- Country: England
- Sovereign state: United Kingdom
- Post town: BRISTOL
- Postcode district: BS2
- Dialling code: 0117
- Police: Avon and Somerset
- Fire: Avon
- Ambulance: South Western
- UK Parliament: Bristol Central

Kingsdown is an area of Bristol, located on high ground immediately north of the city centre and south of Cotham. It lies within the Cotham council ward.

Kingsdown remained rural until the 18th century, but around 1737 land on the southern slope was laid out to become Bristol's first planned suburb. The area was fully developed over the remainder of the century, and as a result Kingsdown has a mostly Georgian character. There are more than 200 listed buildings, and much of the area has been a conservation area since 1973.

St Matthew's Church was built on the northern side of Kingsdown between 1833 and 1835.
