= Donald Morgan =

English cricketer

Personal information
- Full name: Donald Lindsay Morgan
- Born: 5 November 1888; Tianjin, China
- Died: 22 January 1969 (aged 80); Pasadena, California, United States

Domestic team information
- Years: Team
- 1907: Gloucestershire

Career statistics
| Competition | First-class |
|---|---|
| Matches | 2 |
| Runs scored | 3 |
| Batting average | 0.75 |
| 100s/50s | 0/0 |
| Top score | 2 |
| Catches/stumpings | 7/– |
- Source: CricketArchive, 11 July 2011

Lt. Donald Lindsay Morgan (5 November 1888 – 22 January 1969) was an English cricketer who played two first-class matches for Gloucestershire in 1907.

Morgan was born in Tianjin, China. He attended Mill Hill School in London from 1902 to 1907. In his first-class match, against Somerset, he scored a single run in the first innings before being dismissed for a duck in his team's second innings of 37, one of five ducks in the innings. He took five catches in the match, including four in the first innings. In his second match, against Middlesex, he scored 2 and 0, being dismissed in the second innings by Frank Tarrant, who took 9/41. He took three catches in the match. He was commissioned a lieutenant in the United Provinces Light Horse, and was stationed in Baghdad during the First World War as part of the Mesopotamian campaign. He later emigrated to California, and died in Pasadena in 1969.
