= Reggie Ford (cricketer) =

English cricketer (1907–1981)

Personal information
- Full name: Reggie Gilbert Ford
- Born: 5 March 1907; Bristol, England
- Died: 2 October 1981 (aged 74); Bristol, England
- Batting: Right-handed
- Role: Batsman

Domestic team information
- Years: Team
- 1929–1936: Gloucestershire

Career statistics
Competition	FC
Matches	51
Runs scored	496
Batting average	10.55
100s/50s	0/0
Top score	37*
Balls bowled	1,074
Wickets	10
Bowling average	49.30
5 wickets in innings	0
10 wickets in match	0
Best bowling	2/11
Catches/stumpings	23/0
- Source: Cricinfo, 12 June 2022

Reggie Gilbert Ford (5 March 1907 – 2 October 1981) was an English cricketer. He played 57 matches for Gloucestershire between 1929 and 1936.
