= Andy Wilson (cricketer) =

English cricketer

Personal information
- Full name: Arthur Edward Wilson
- Born: 18 May 1910; Paddington, London, England
- Died: 29 July 2002 (aged 92); Redmarley D'Abitot, Gloucestershire, England
- Batting: Left-handed
- Bowling: Slow left-arm orthodox
- Role: Wicket-keeper

Domestic team information
- Years: Team
- 1932–1935: Middlesex
- 1936–1955: Gloucestershire

Career statistics
Competition	First-class
Matches	328
Runs scored	10,744
Batting average	25.28
100s/50s	7/59
Top score	188
Balls bowled	2
Wickets	0
Bowling average	–
5 wickets in innings	–
10 wickets in match	–
Best bowling	–
Catches/stumpings	425/176
- Source: ESPNcricinfo, 24 April 2017

Arthur Edward Wilson (18 May 1910 – 29 July 2002) was an English first-class cricketer. A wicketkeeper, he played with Gloucestershire between 1936 and 1955.

He started his career at Middlesex in 1932 where he originally played as a lower order batsman. With him unable to cement his spot in the side he moved to Gloucestershire in 1935 and became their first choice keeper a couple of years later after he had qualified for residence. He scored 1138 runs in his debut season which included 130 against Middlesex at Lord's.

After fighting in World War 2 he returned to the county in 1946 where he began opening the batting. He took 30 stumpings in 1947 and made his highest score of 188 against Sussex at Priory Park, Chichester in 1949. For every season until 1950 he passed 1000 runs, last achieving the feat in 1953. He coached Gloucestershire from 1950 and in a match against Hampshire in 1953 he took a record 10 catches, 6 of them in the first innings.

After retiring from cricket he became a sports journalist, working for a number of newspapers, and also worked for the National Farmers' Union.
