= Greenbank Cricket Ground =

Cricket ground in Bristol, England

Coordinates: 51.46492°N 2.55216°W

Greenbank
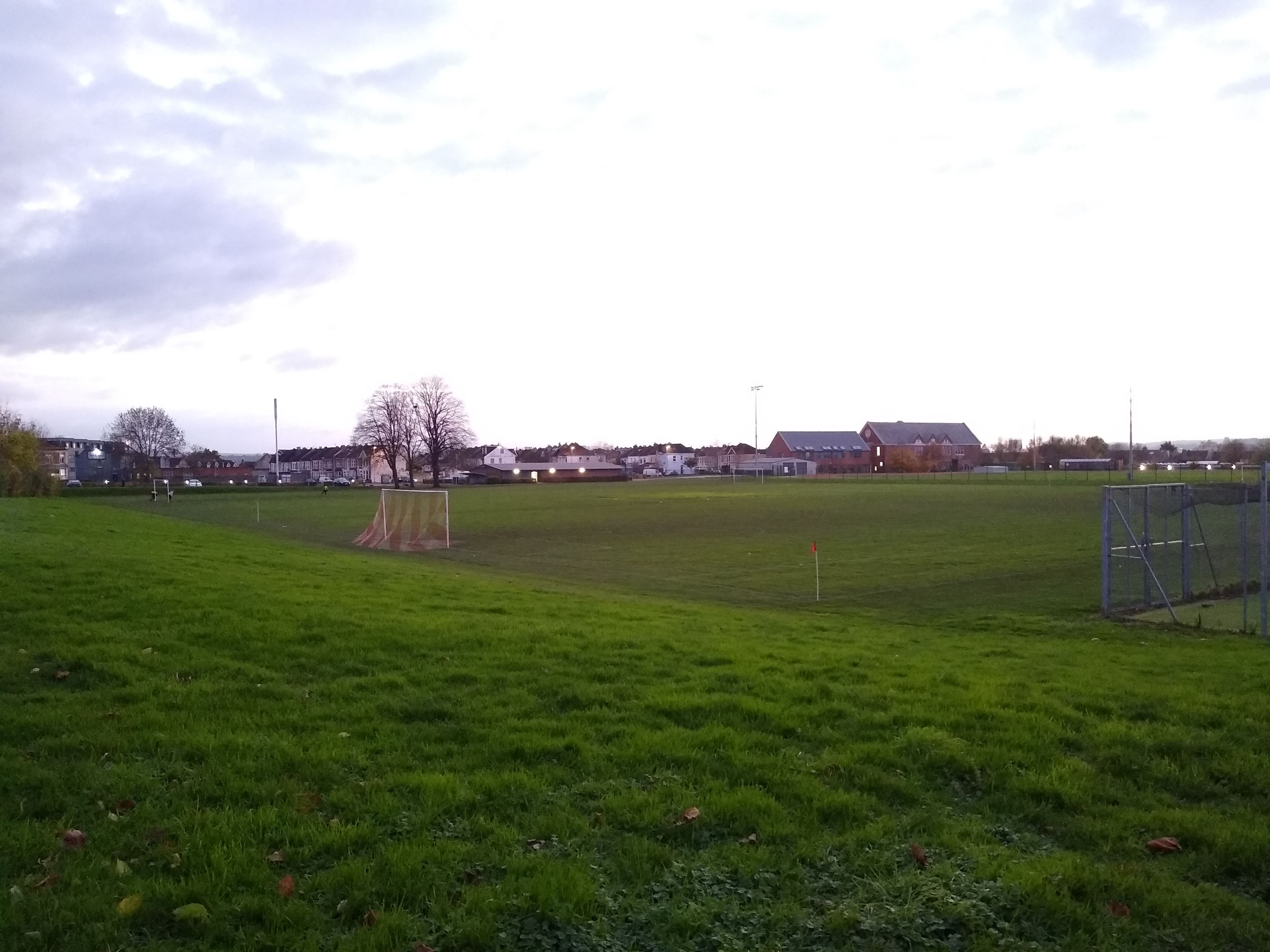
- Greenbank Cricket Ground in 2022

Ground information
- Location: Bristol
- Establishment: 1922 (first recorded match)

Team information
Gloucestershire	(1922-1928)
- As of 11 September 2010; Source: Ground profile

Greenbank (also known as Packer's Ground) is a cricket ground in Bristol. The ground was initially owned by H.J. Packer and Co Ltd. The first first-class match on the ground was in 1922, when Gloucestershire played Sussex. Gloucestershire played first-class matches at the ground from 1922 to 1928, playing a total of 20 first-class matches there, the last of which saw them play Derbyshire in the 1928 County Championship.

Gloucestershire also played a non first-class at the ground in 1924 against a Scotland XI.

The ground still exists today, after being sold by H.J. Packer and Co Ltd in 1935, it came under the ownership of the local council and is today used by the Old Georgian Eastville Club. In recent times, the ground has undergone a refurbishment with the construction of new buildings and the relaying of the pitch.
