= George Gilbert (cricketer) =

English cricketer (1829–1906)

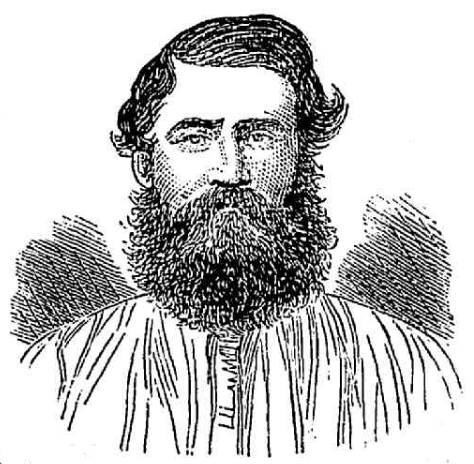

Personal information
- Full name: George Henry Bailey Gilbert
- Born: 2 September 1829; Cheltenham, England
- Died: 16 June 1906 (aged 76); Summer Hill, Sydney, Australia
- Batting: Right-handed
- Bowling: Right-arm medium

Domestic team information
- Years: Team
- 1855/56–1875/76: New South Wales

Career statistics
Competition	First-class
Matches	18
Runs scored	283
Batting average	8.32
100s/50s	0/0
Top score	31
Balls bowled	262
Wickets	28
Bowling average	10.00
5 wickets in innings	2
10 wickets in match	1
Best bowling	6/65
Catches/stumpings	13/–
- Source: Cricinfo, 6 March 2020

George Henry Bailey Gilbert (2 September 1829 – 16 June 1906) was an English cricketer who spent most of his life in Australia and New Zealand.

== Life and career ==
Gilbert was born in Cheltenham. He was the elder brother of Walter Gilbert and a cousin of E. M., W. G. and Fred Grace. He made six first-class cricket appearances in 1851 including two for Middlesex and one for the Gentlemen against the Players.

He emigrated to Australia in 1852. Gilbert played in 12 first-class matches for New South Wales, all of them against Victoria, over a 19-year period from March 1856 to March 1875. He captained New South Wales to victory over Victoria in their inaugural first-class match, and for several seasons afterwards.

In 1857 the Australian Cricketer's Guide said of him:

His batting is very effective, but wanting in finish, and he would do more if not so fond of hitting to leg. Is a good change round-arm bowler. His fielding is good, and would be rendered much more elegant if he curbed his sometimes too exuberant spirits.

Gilbert's 31 runs in the second innings were the top score of the match when New South Wales beat Victoria in Sydney in 1856–57. The next season he took the first hat-trick in Australian first-class cricket, though it did not prevent Victoria from winning.

Gilbert later spent some time in New Zealand, where he struggled financially. A tobacconist by preference, he also worked as a surveyor, clerk, station master and timber worker to feed his nine children. He was also at one stage the groundsman for the cricket ground in the Sydney suburb of Burwood, and later fossicked for gold at Fish River, near Bathurst.

Gilbert died in June 1906 at his daughter's house in the Sydney suburb of Summer Hill after being ill for four months.
