= International cricket in 1880 =

International cricket season

The 1880 international cricket season was from April 1880 to September 1880. The season consisted of a single international tour, visiting Australia in England for one-off series which was won by England. In the match, W. G. Grace scored England's first Test century. Also his brothers E. M. Grace and Fred Grace provided the first instance of three brothers playing the same Test.

== Season overview ==
International tours
Start date	Home team	Away team	Results [Matches]	
Start date	Home team	Away team	Test	FC
6 September 1880	England	Australia	1–0 [1]	—

== July ==
=== Australia in England ===
One-off Test match
No.	Date	Home captain	Away captain	Venue	Result
Test 4	6–8 September	Lord Harris	Billy Murdoch	Kennington Oval, London	England by 5 wickets
