= Charles Grace =

English cricketer

Personal information
- Full name: Charles Butler Grace
- Born: 26 March 1882; Bristol, England
- Died: 6 June 1938 (aged 56); Bexhill-on-Sea, Sussex, England
- Batting: Right-handed
- Bowling: Right-arm lob
- Role: All-rounder
- Relatives: W. G. Grace (father); E. M. Grace (uncle); Fred Grace (uncle); W. G. Grace junior (brother)

Domestic team information
- Years: Team
- 1900: London County
- 1906: W. G. Grace's XI

Career statistics
Competition	First-class
Matches	4
Runs scored	42
Batting average	8.40
100s/50s	0/0
Top score	35
Balls bowled	166
Wickets	3
Bowling average	30.66
5 wickets in innings	1
10 wickets in match	0
Best bowling	3/62
Catches/stumpings	3/–
- Source: CricketArchive, 10 July 2011

Dr Charles Butler Grace (26 March 1882 – 6 June 1938) was an English first-class cricketer who was the third-born son of W. G. Grace. He was named after Charles Butler, a Tasmanian cricketer with whom W. G. Grace had stayed in 1873-74 and who became a friend.

He attended Clifton College, playing for the school's first eleven cricket team in 1898–99. He played four first-class matches for London County in 1900 and W. G. Grace's XI in 1906. Grace was an exponent of lob bowling, and continued this practice well after it had become uncommon in first-class matches. His matches for London County were played alongside his father and his brother, W. G. Grace Jr. He also participated in his father's last cricket match, for Eltham against Grove Park on 25 July 1914, scoring four runs opening the batting. His father made an unbeaten 69 not out, the highest score by a batsman in either team. Charles died in Sussex in 1938.
