= W. G. Grace Jr =

English cricketer

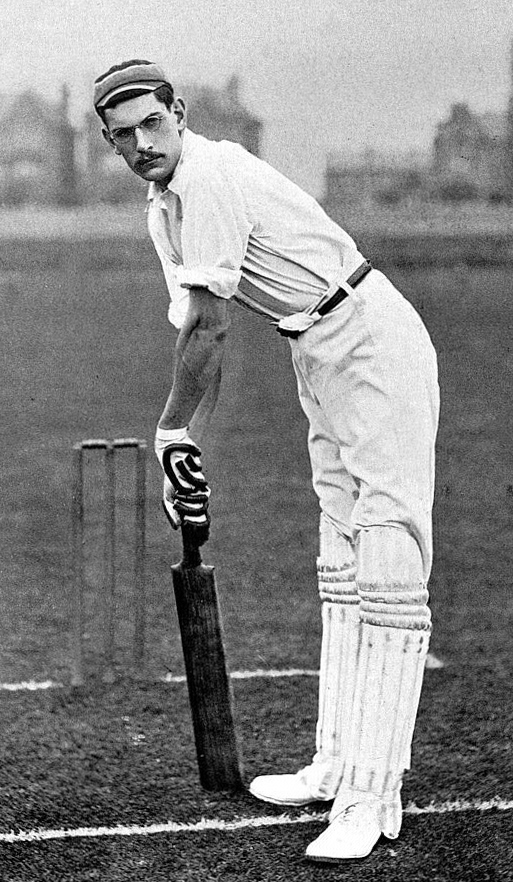

Personal information
- Full name: William Gilbert Grace
- Born: 6 July 1874; West Brompton, Kensington, England
- Died: 2 March 1905 (aged 30); East Cowes, Isle of Wight, England
- Batting: Right-handed
- Bowling: Right-arm fast-medium
- Role: All-rounder
- Relatives: W. G. Grace (father), E. M. Grace, Fred Grace (uncles), Charles Grace (brother)

Domestic team information
- Years: Team
- 1893–98: Gloucestershire
- 1894–95: Marylebone Cricket Club (MCC)
- 1894–96: Cambridge University
- 1900–03: London County

Career statistics
Competition	First-class
Matches	57
Runs scored	1,324
Batting average	15.21
100s/50s	0/5
Top score	79
Balls bowled	3561
Wickets	42
Bowling average	39.45
5 wickets in innings	1
10 wickets in match	0
Best bowling	6/79
Catches/stumpings	43/–
- Source: CricketArchive

William Gilbert Grace Jr (6 July 1874 – 2 March 1905) was an English first-class cricketer who was the first-born son of W. G. Grace.

He won scholarships to Clifton College and Pembroke College, Cambridge, where he studied mathematics. He played in 57 matches for Cambridge University, Gloucestershire and London County in a career lasting from 1893 to 1903, playing as an all-rounder. He made 1,324 runs at an average of 15.21 with a highest score of 79, and took 42 wickets at an average of 39.45 with a best of six for 79.

Grace often played for Gloucestershire, London County and MCC alongside his father, his brother Charles Grace and his uncle E. M. Grace, mostly under his father's captaincy. Grace also played rugby union for the Northants and East Midland XV.

He became a schoolteacher, teaching at Oundle School in Northamptonshire and then at Royal Naval College, Osborne. He died at the age of 30 at 3:00 AM on March 2, 1905, during the night following an operation for appendicitis the previous day.
