= Henry Grace (disambiguation) =

Henry Grace (1907–1983) was an American set decorator.

Henry Grace may also refer to:

- Henry Grace (cricketer) (1833–1895), English cricketer and brother of W. G. Grace
- Henry Grace (Royal Navy officer) (1876–1937), Royal Navy officer, Chief of the Submarine Service, and son of W. G. Grace
