= Henry Grace (cricketer) =

English cricketer

Henry Grace (31 January 1833 – 13 November 1895) was an English cricketer active in 1871 who played for Gloucestershire. A member of the Grace family and an elder brother of E. M., W. G. and Fred, he was born in Downend, near Bristol, and died in Honiton. He appeared in three first-class matches as a righthanded batsman who bowled right arm medium pace with a roundarm action. He did not pursue a cricket career like his brothers as he entered the medical profession on a full-time basis. He scored four runs with a highest score of 4 and took three wickets with a best analysis of three for 48.
