= English cricket team in Australia in 1873–74 =

An England cricket team toured Australia in 1873–74. This was the third tour of Australia by an English team, the previous one being in 1863–64. The team is sometimes referred to as W. G. Grace's XI.

== Squad ==
The team was captained by W. G. Grace (Gloucestershire) who was joined by Fred Grace, James Bush (both Gloucestershire); William Oscroft, Martin McIntyre (both Nottinghamshire); Harry Jupp, James Southerton, Richard Humphrey, Farrington Boult (all Surrey); Andrew Greenwood (Yorkshire); James Lillywhite (Sussex); W. R. Gilbert (Middlesex). The party consisted of five amateurs and seven professionals.

== Tour ==
The team played 15 matches in Australia but none are recognised as a first-class fixture.
