= Farrington Boult =

English cricketer

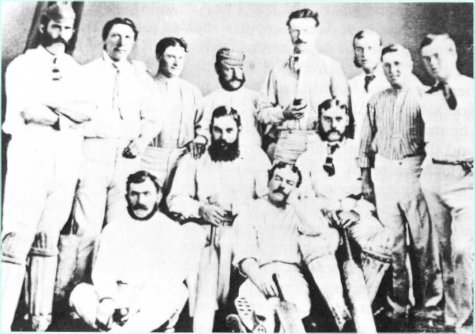
- English cricket team of 1873-74, captained by W.G. Grace. From left standing: G.A. Bush, W. Oscroft, R. Humphries, J. Southerton, M. McIntyre, F.H. Boult, A. Greenwood, W.R. Gilbert. Seated: J. Lillywhite, W.G. Grace, H. Jupp, G.F. Grace.

Personal information
- Full name: Farrington Holker Boult
- Born: 12 June 1852; Bath, Somerset
- Died: 21 May 1882 (aged 29); Marylebone, London
- Source: Cricinfo, 12 March 2017

Farrington Holker Boult (12 June 1852 – 21 May 1882) was an English cricketer. He played 25 first-class matches for Surrey between 1872 and 1873. He was one of the amateurs who toured Australia with W. G. Grace's team in 1873-74.

== See also ==
- List of Surrey County Cricket Club players
