= Norman Grace =

English cricketer and Royal Navy officer

Personal information
- Full name: Norman Vere Grace
- Born: 31 July 1894; Thornbury, Gloucestershire, England
- Died: 20 February 1975 (aged 80); Amberley, Gloucestershire, England
- Batting: Right-handed
- Bowling: Right-arm slow
- Relatives: Grace family

Career statistics
| Competition | First-class |
|---|---|
| Matches | 3 |
| Runs scored | 25 |
| Batting average | 5.00 |
| 100s/50s | 0/0 |
| Top score | 14 |
| Balls bowled | 157 |
| Wickets | 7 |
| Bowling average | 16.28 |
| 5 wickets in innings | 1 |
| 10 wickets in match | 0 |
| Best bowling | 5/69 |
| Catches/stumpings | 1/– |
- Source: Cricinfo, 25 September 2019

Norman Vere Grace DL (31 July 1894 – 20 February 1975) was an English first-class cricketer and Royal Navy officer.

A member of the famous cricketing Grace family, he was born to the Test cricketer E. M. Grace in July 1894 at Thornbury, Gloucestershire. He was educated at Wellington College, before joining the Royal Navy. He graduated from Britannia Royal Naval College in 1912, entering into service as a midshipman. Grace served in the navy during the First World War, in the latter stages of which he was promoted to the rank of lieutenant. Following the war he played first-class cricket for the Royal Navy against the British Army cricket team at Lord's in 1920, claiming five wickets on debut. Three years later in December 1923, he was promoted to the rank of lieutenant commander. He made two further first-class appearances for the Royal Navy against the Army in 1923 and 1927, though he took only a further two wickets in these matches. In July 1929, he was promoted to the rank of commander, before being promoted to the rank of captain in June 1937.

Grace served during the Second World War, captaining firstly the minelayer HMS Adventure from 1940–42, for which he was mentioned in dispatches, and later the heavy cruiser HMS Berwick between January and August 1944. Then from September 1944 to January 1946, he commanded HMS Vernon when it was based at Roedean School and oversaw its return to Portsmouth after the war. After relinquishing his command of Vernon, Grace was appointed as a naval aide-de-camp to George VI in February 1946. Four months later he retired from active service. He later served as a deputy lieutenant for Gloucestershire in 1960. Grace died in February 1975 at Amberley, Gloucestershire. He had married Lilla Marguerite Spiller in County Cork in 1932, and the couple had two sons.
