= Eric Midwinter =

English author, broadcaster and academic (1932–2025)

Midwinter in 2011

Eric Clare Midwinter OBE (11 February 1932 – 8 August 2025) was an English author, broadcaster and academic. He was a consumer advocate, a social policy analyst, a historian of the sport of cricket and an expert on British comedy.

== Life and career ==
Eric Midwinter was born in Sale, Lancashire, on 11 February 1932. He was educated at a local grammar school and St Catharine's College, Cambridge, where he read history. Between 1968 and 1971, he led the team for action research in the Liverpool Education Priority Area. Between 1972 and 1975, as Principal of the Liverpool Teachers' Centre, he established an organisational structure capable of delivering continuing professional development to all teachers in Liverpool. He was Chairman of the London Regional Passengers Committee, the government-appointed watchdog for public transport, from 1984 to 1996. He was Director of the Centre for Policy on Ageing from 1980 to 1991, when the centre was developing its role as a policy institute, and was later its chairman. He was Visiting Professor of Education at the University of Exeter from 1992 to 2001.

A social historian and social policy analyst, he was a co-founder of the University of the Third Age and was consultant to the Millennium Debate of the Age project and to the International Longevity Centre UK. He was Chairman of the Health and Social Welfare Board of the Open University, which awarded him an Honorary Doctorate, and a member of the Carnegie Inquiry into the Third Age Committee. He was also a member of the Advisory Committee on Telecommunications for Disabled and Elderly People and, for five years, a member of the Prince of Wales Advisory Group on Disability. He completed a European Commission study, under the auspices of Age Concern England, into the feasibility of a Senior Euro-pass. Until 2008, he was Chairman of the Community Education Development Centre, Coventry.

A cricket historian, he was for seven years President of the Association of Cricket Statisticians and Historians, and a biographer of W. G. Grace. Midwinter won The Cricket Society/MCC Book of the Year award in 2005 for Red Shirts and Roses, and the Wisden Book of the Year award in 2011 for The Cricketer's Progress: Meadowland to Mumbai. He was for several years editor of the MCC Annual, and prepared many notices of the lives of cricketers and comedians for the old and new Dictionary of National Biography. He was also an expert on British comedy, through, for instance, his books Make 'em Laugh: Famous Comedians and their Worlds and The People's Jesters; British Comedians in the 20th Century.

Midwinter and his wife Margaret lived in Harpenden, Hertfordshire. He died on 8 August 2025, at the age of 93.

== Bibliography ==
- Social Administration in Lancashire, 1830–60: Poor Law, Public Health and Police (1966)
- Law and Order in Early Victorian Lancashire (1968)
- Victorian Social Reform (1968)
- Nineteenth Century Education (1970)
- Old Liverpool (1971)
- Priority Education: An Account of the Liverpool Project (1972)
- Projections and Social Environment and the Urban School (1972)
- Patterns of Community Education (1973)
- Preschool Priorities (1974)
- Education and the Community (1975)
- Education for Sale (1977)
- Make 'em Laugh: Famous Comedians and Their Worlds (1979)
- Schools in Society: The Evolution of English Education (1980)
- W.G. Grace: His Life and Times (1981)
- Age is Opportunity: Education and Older People (1982)
- Ten Million People (1982)
- Mutual Aid Universities (1984)
- The Wage of Retirement: The Case for a New Pensions Policy (1985)
- Fair Game: Myth and Reality in Sport (1986)
- Caring for Cash: The Issue of Private Domiciliary Care (1986)
- The Lost Seasons: Cricket in Wartime, 1939–45 (1987)
- Polls Apart?: Older Voters and the 1987 General Election (1987, with Susan Tester)
- New Design for Old: Function, Style and Older People (1988)
- Red Roses Crest the Caps: Story of Lancashire County Cricket Club (1989)
- Creating Chances: Arts by Older People (1990)
- The Old Order: Crime and Older People (1990)
- Brylcreem Summer: The 1947 Cricket Season (1991)
- The Illustrated History of County Cricket (1992)
- Citizenship: From Ageism to Participation (1992)
- Get Staffed!: A Report to the London Regional Passengers Committee on the Destaffing of British Rail's London Area Stations (1992)
- A Voyage of Rediscovery: A Guide to Writing Your Life Story (1993)
- The Rhubarb People: A Childhood Memoir of Manchester in the '30s (1993)
- The Development of Social Welfare in Britain (1994)
- Darling Old Oval : A History of 150 Years of Surrey Cricket at the Oval, 1845–1995 (1995)
- Pensioned Off: Retirement and Income Examined (1997)
- Yesterdays: The Way We Were, 1919–1939 (1998)
- Yesterdays: Our Finest Hours, 1939–1953 (2001)
- Quill on Willow: Cricket in Literature (2001)
- Best Remembered: A Hundred Stars of Yesteryear (2002)
- As One Stage Door Closes: The Story of John Wade – Jobbing Conjuror (2002)
- Novel Approaches: A Guide to the Popular Classic Novel (2003)
- 500 Beacons: The U3A Story (2004)
- Red Shirts and Roses: The Tale of the Two Old Traffords (2005)
- The People's Jesters: British Comedians in the 20th Century (2006)
- Salisbury (2006)
- Parish to Planet: How Football Came to Rule the World (2007)
- George Duckworth: Warrington's Ambassador at Large (2007)
- I Say, I Say, I Say: The Double Act Story (2009)
- The Cricketer's Progress: Meadowland to Mumbai (2010)
- Cricket Lore: The Guide (2014)
- Class Peace: An Analysis of Social Status and English Cricket 1846–1962 (2018)
- 'His Captain's hand on his shoulder smote': The incidence and influence of cricket in schoolboy stories (2019)
- Cricket's Four Epochs: How cricket reflects civil society (2021)
- Lords of Mischief: Clown Cricket and Dan Leno (2022)
- The Cricketing Dickens (2024)
- Cricket's Revolution: Its Sudden Leap into Modernity (2025)
- Christianity at the Crease: Cricket and the Church (2025)

The 2015 book Variety is the Spice of Life: The Worlds of Eric Midwinter is an appreciation of his life and work.
