= Simon Rae =

British poet

Simon Rae is a British poet, broadcaster, biographer and playwright who runs the Top Edge Productions theatre company. He won the Poetry Society's National Poetry Competition in 1999 and has also been awarded an Eric Gregory Award and a Southern Arts Literature Bursary and held Royal Literary Fund fellowships at Oxford Brookes and Warwick Universities. His play Grass won a Fringe Highlight award in 2002.

Rae presented Radio 4's Poetry Please for five years and wrote a regular topical poem for the Saturday Guardian for ten years. His most recent book of poems was Gift Horses, published in 2006 by Enitharmon Press.

He has written a biography of the cricketer WG Grace: W.G.Grace: A Life (Faber, 1998).

== Sources ==
- Simon Rae, poet, broadcaster, biographer, playwright website
- Royal Literary Fund -Simon Rae website
- Simon Rae - Playwright website
- Top Edge Productions website
- Enitharmon Press website
- Radio 4 - Poetry Please website
