= Henry Grace (Royal Navy officer) =

Royal Navy Vice-Admiral (1876-1937)

Vice-Admiral Henry Grace CB
- Grace photographed by Walter Stoneman in 1919
- Born: 11 July 1876; Kensington, London
- Died: 19 March 1937 (aged 60); Devonport, Plymouth
- Military career
- Allegiance: United Kingdom
- Branch: Royal Navy
- Rank: Vice-Admiral
- Commands: HMS Grafton; HMS Yarmouth; HMS Birkenhead; HMS Vindictive
- Conflicts: World War I
- Awards: Companion of the Order of the Bath

Vice-Admiral Henry Edgar Grace CB (11 July 1876 – 19 March 1937) was a Royal Navy officer who served as head of the Submarine Service.

== Naval career ==
The son of W. G. Grace, the famous cricketer, Grace was promoted to captain on 31 December 1914 and served in the First World War becoming commanding officer of the cruiser HMS Grafton in June 1915, of the cruiser HMS Yarmouth in August 1917, of the cruiser HMS Birkenhead in May 1918 and of the aircraft carrier HMS Vindictive in September 1918. He was mentioned in dispatches for valuable service during operations in the Gulf of Finland.

He was appointed Commodore-in-Charge, Hong Kong from June 1922 to October 1924. Grace went on to be head of the navy's submarine service as Rear-Admiral (S) in September 1927.

He was promoted Vice-Admiral on 1 April 1930 and put on the Retired List the following day.

== Family ==
Grace married Alice Catherine Slaughter; they had a son and three daughters.

Military offices
Preceded by Vernon Haggard	Rear-Admiral (S); 1927–1929	Succeeded by Martin Dunbar-Nasmith
