= Walter Gilbert (cricketer) =

English Amateur cricketer (1853–1924)

Personal information
- Full name: Walter Raleigh Gilbert
- Born: 16 September 1853; Strand, London, England
- Died: 26 July 1924 (aged 70); Calgary, Alberta, Canada
- Batting: Right-handed
- Bowling: Right-arm slow-medium
- Role: Batsman

Domestic team information
- Years: Team
- 1873–1874: Middlesex
- 1876–1886: Gloucestershire

Career statistics
Competition	First-class
Matches	175
Runs scored	5,290
Batting average	19.16
100s/50s	3/15
Top score	205*
Balls bowled	11,867
Wickets	295
Bowling average	17.93
5 wickets in innings	15
10 wickets in match	1
Best bowling	7/28
Catches/stumpings	160/6
- Source: CricketArchive, 3 April 2011

Walter Raleigh Gilbert (16 September 1853 – 26 July 1924) was an English amateur cricketer who played first-class cricket for Middlesex and Gloucestershire between 1873 and 1886. A cousin of W. G. Grace, he played for Gloucestershire when, dominated by the Grace family, it was the leading county. Gilbert's best season was 1876, when he scored 205 not out for the county, but he was subsequently less successful. Closely connected with the United South of England Eleven, a professional touring team of which he eventually became secretary, Gilbert was financially affected by a declining interest in such teams. With insufficient income to continue as an amateur he became a professional in 1886, but played only one match before he was caught stealing from teammates in a minor match, ending his first-class career. After serving a 28-day prison sentence Gilbert moved to Canada, where he worked for the Land Titles Office in Calgary while remaining a prominent cricketer. He died aged 70 in 1924, but for nearly 60 years after his death, there seemed to be a conspiracy of silence over his fate.

== Early life and career ==
Walter Gilbert was born in London on 16 September 1853. He spent some time living in Downend with his maternal aunt, Martha Grace, the mother of W. G. Grace, as a result of which he became friendly with Grace and his brothers. Between 1869 and 1871 Gilbert made several appearances in minor cricket for teams representing Worcestershire and went on to play for the United South of England Eleven, one of several fully professional teams that toured the country playing mainly minor matches. In 1871 he made his first-class debut, playing as an amateur in a team chosen by W. G. Grace for a match against Kent. He scored 13 and 1, kept wicket in at least the first innings, held two catches, and achieved a stumping. By virtue of his London birth, Gilbert was qualified to play cricket for Middlesex. He made nine appearances for the county during the 1873 and 1874 seasons, achieving a highest score of 49, averaging 17.40 with the bat and taking two wickets. His first score of over fifty runs in first-class matches came for the United South of England XI, for whom he continued to play regularly, against the United North of England XI in 1874. He also achieved some success as a bowler, taking five wickets for W. G. Grace's team against Kent in 1873.

== Achieving prominence ==
In the English winter of 1873–74, Gilbert was chosen by W. G. Grace to accompany his touring team to Australia. Gilbert had a string of single-figure scores and a highest score of 33 not out. (Note: None of the matches on this tour were first-class.) Nevertheless, he and Grace got on well, and he was a popular member of the touring party. Grace enjoyed his company to the extent of hunting kangaroos with him. During the 1874 season Gilbert made a double century in minor cricket, scoring 254 not out for Thornbury against Sneyd Park. Later in the season he made a further representative appearance, playing for the Gentlemen against the Players at Prince's Cricket Ground and opening the batting with W. G. Grace; he scored 14 and 16 and took four wickets in the Players' first innings. He also played in the corresponding fixture the following year.

By 1876 Gilbert had qualified to play for Gloucestershire, as he had lived in the county for the length of time required by the rules. In his first season for the club he finished fifth in the first-class batting averages, scoring 907 runs at an average of 36.28. His highest score was 205 not out for an England XI against Cambridge University, the third-highest score of the season after W. G. Grace's two triple centuries. His innings lasted about seven hours, and he batted on each of the three days of the match. This was his maiden first-class century; he scored another hundred later in the season when he made 143 runs for a combined Kent and Gloucestershire side against a team representing England. In the same season he took 28 wickets at an average of 19.64, including seven wickets for 65 runs in the match between the United South of England XI and the United North of England XI.

== Decline and disgrace ==
Over the next few seasons Gilbert was not as successful with the bat; in 1877 he failed to exceed 47 in any innings, he scored about half the number of runs that he had during the previous year, and his average dropped to 15.70. His average remained below 20 in four of the next five seasons and never passed 23. In six seasons, he scored only six fifties. On the other hand, he took 56 wickets in both 1877 and 1878, averaging under 17 with the ball. He achieved some notable performances as a bowler, including bowling unchanged throughout a game in partnership with W. G. Grace. But from 1879 he bowled less frequently, and never passed 23 wickets in a season again. Even so, Gilbert represented the Gentlemen against the Players twice in 1877, his final appearances in the fixture; in four games, he scored just 43 runs and took 16 wickets.

By this time Gilbert faced financial difficulty as an amateur cricketer. Most amateurs were from privileged backgrounds, whereas professionals mainly came from the working class. It was almost unthinkable for an amateur to become a professional, although many did receive financial inducements such as generous expenses and sinecure positions within county organisations. Unlike the Grace brothers, Gilbert did not have a profession outside cricket to provide a supplementary income allowing him to live comfortably. A solution seemed to arrive in 1880, when Fred Grace, the manager of the United South of England XI touring side and one of W. G. Grace's brothers, died and Gilbert took over his paid job as secretary. But the popularity of professional touring teams was already in decline, and the increasing number of matches between county teams attracted more interest. An indication of trouble came in 1882 when a professional cricketer took Gilbert to court over unpaid fees for an appearance in a match.

In three seasons between 1883 and 1885 Gilbert's batting form improved somewhat. Appearing mainly for Gloucestershire, Gilbert increased his first-class batting average beyond 20, and in 1885 he hit his third first-class century when he scored 102 against Yorkshire. At the start of the 1886 season Gilbert was featured in the popular biographical article in the weekly magazine Cricket, a significant accolade suggesting that he was highly regarded. A few days after the article's appearance Gilbert announced that he would in future play for Gloucestershire as a professional, but after only one appearance for the county he disappeared from first-class cricket. Official sources, including Cricket magazine in which Gilbert had recently been featured, James Lillywhite's Cricketers' Annual and Wisden Cricketers' Almanack offered no explanation. Wisden ended its match report on Gilbert's only professional appearance: "... about [Gilbert's] subsequent disappearance from cricket there is no need to speak".

Gilbert had also been engaged by a club called East Gloucestershire, based in Cheltenham, which played minor cricket. The explanation for Gilbert's disappearance was to be found in a match he played for the club on 4 and 5 June 1886. Before the second day's play, Gilbert arrived early at the ground and went into the pavilion. Because several sums of money had recently gone missing from the pavilion, a policeman was hidden in the team's dressing room and he saw Gilbert searching clothes and stealing money. On being confronted, Gilbert produced the coins, one of which had been marked so that it could be identified. The East Gloucestershire match continued, but Gilbert's name was omitted from the published scorecard; the wickets he had taken on the first day were credited to "Smith", and either only ten players were listed or Gilbert's position in the batting order was taken by "Mr E. L. Even", who did not bat. Gilbert had been selected for Gloucestershire's first-class match against Sussex on 7 June, but he was dropped from the side and his place taken by a player making his only appearance in the side. Gilbert was in police court while the match was taking place, charged with theft. He admitted stealing from two men and expressed remorse. According to the report in The Times, he stated that if he were forgiven, he would move to Australia; his solicitor argued that Gilbert had been "harassed and worried" for some time and was suffering from erysipelas and could barely control his own behaviour. His solicitor requested that any punishment should allow Gilbert to go overseas, but Gilbert was sentenced to 28 days imprisonment. Gilbert's family then arranged for him to move to Canada; at the time it was common for families to send disgraced members to distant parts of the British Empire to minimise scandal.

In first-class cricket, Gilbert scored 5,290 runs at an average of 19.16 with three hundreds. With the ball, he took 295 wickets at an average of 17.93. His Wisden obituary stated: "His fielding at deep-leg to W. G. Grace's bowling was always excellent, for he covered much ground and was a sure catch. Although overshadowed by his famous cricketing cousins, he played a prominent part in the victories gained during Gloucestershire's greatest years."

== Final years ==
In Canada Gilbert found employment with the Land Titles Office in Calgary, for whom he worked for 17 years. Cricket historian Benny Green wrote: "No breath of scandal or disgrace ever attached to Gilbert's thirty-eight years of exile, nor was there found to be even one square inch missing from the Land Titles Office when Gilbert finally retired from it."

Gilbert had four children from his marriage to the daughter of cricketer James Lillywhite senior. His son was killed in the First World War, flying with the Royal Flying Corps, and his three daughters joined the Royal Army Medical Corps. He continued to play cricket and became one of Canada's leading cricketers. Gilbert died in Calgary on 26 July 1924, aged 70.

== Continued controversy ==
After Gilbert's retirement, and even following his death, controversy remained attached to his name; there seemed to be a conspiracy of silence surrounding his fate. Cricket historians rarely mentioned him, despite his varied career. W. G. Grace, although including Gilbert in an appendix of leading batsmen in his 1891 book Cricket, did not include him in the text at all, despite the book's more than 400 pages; in his Cricketers I Have Met, Grace described 121 cricketers but did not mention his cousin. Further evidence of Gilbert's disgrace came in the pages of Wisden. Although Gilbert began as an amateur cricketer, which entitled him to have "Mr." before his name in the "Births and Deaths" section, he was referred to until his death as "Gilbert, W. R.", which denoted a professional. However, in his Wisden obituary he received the title "Mr. W. R. Gilbert", even though the "Births and Deaths" still listed him as a professional, and in 1935 he was once again restored to amateur status in "Births and Deaths", for reasons which are unclear. The same obituary glossed over Gilbert's enforced retirement from cricket, simply observing: "At the beginning of 1886 he became a professional, and the season was not far advanced before his career in first-class cricket ended abruptly. He then left England for Canada." Even in 1970, the silence continued; historian Rowland Bowen wrote about the story but concluded by saying: "Another indication of the recurring instinct for suppression was a suggestion to me that if this story had not appeared in print before (it has not) it should not now." It is not clear who made this suggestion, whether it was descendants of the Grace family, a cricket administrator or someone else. It was not until 1984 that the full story was published by historian Robert Brooke. In reviewing what he considered to be the injustice of the case, and reflecting on Gilbert's success in Canada, Green wrote: "No wonder that those responsible for this act of appalling cruelty went to such fatuous lengths to keep its details a secret."

== Bibliography ==
- Green, Benny (1988). A History of Cricket. London: Guild Publishing. OCLC 671855644.
