= Fred Grace =

English cricketer (1850–1880)

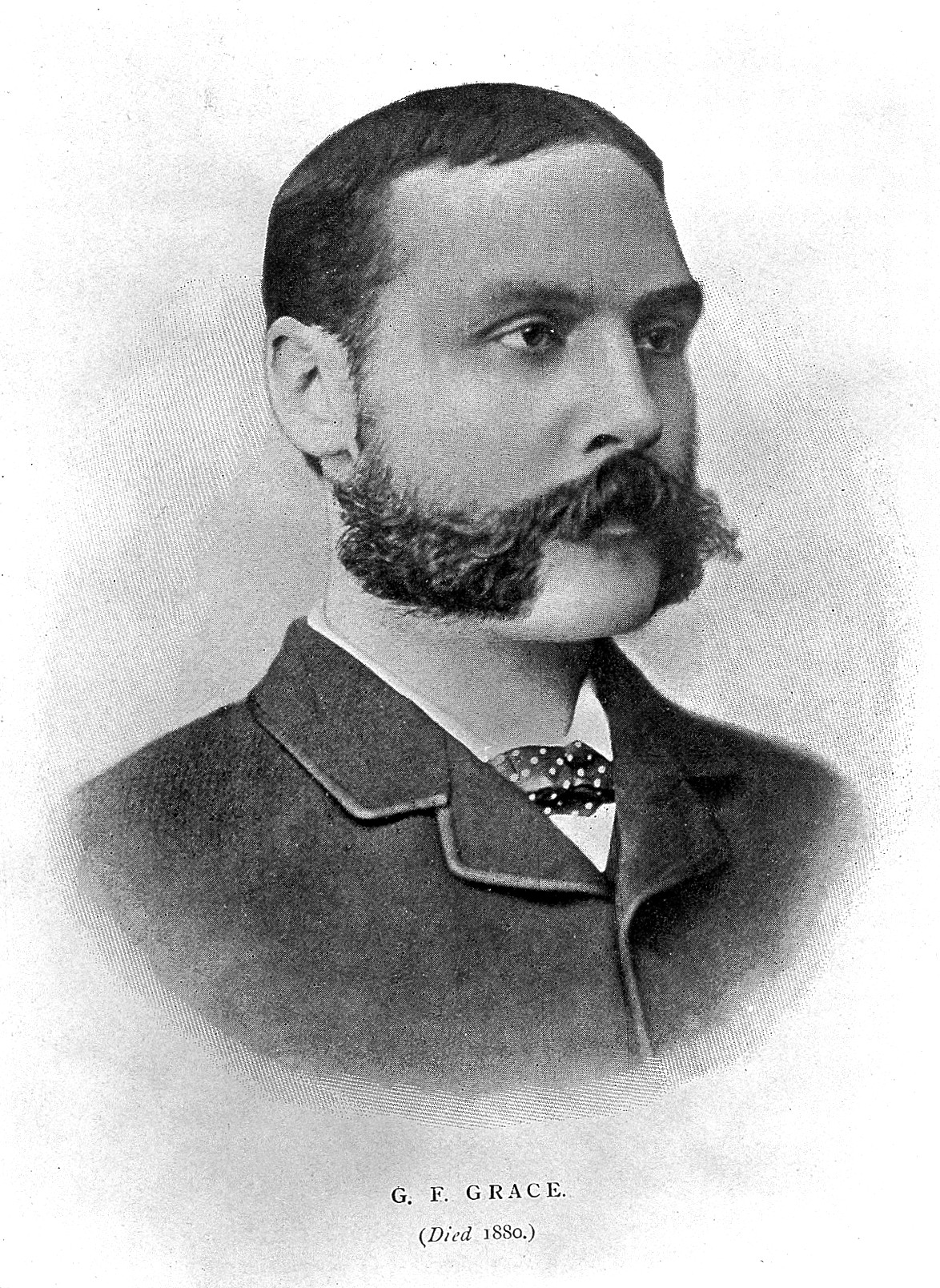

Personal information
- Full name: George Frederick Grace
- Born: 13 December 1850; Downend, near Bristol
- Died: 22 September 1880 (aged 29); Basingstoke, Hampshire
- Batting: Right-handed
- Bowling: Right-arm fast
- Role: All-rounder
- Relatives: Henry Grace (brother); E. M. Grace (brother); W. G. Grace (brother); W. R. Gilbert (cousin)

International information
- National side: England
- Only Test (cap 23): 6 September 1880 v Australia

Domestic team information
- Years: Team
- 1870–1880: Gloucestershire
- 1870–1876: United South of England Eleven

Career statistics
Competition	Test	First-class
Matches	1	195
Runs scored	0	6,906
Batting average	0.00	25.02
100s/50s	0/0	8/32
Top score	0	189*
Balls bowled	–	17,649
Wickets	–	329
Bowling average	–	20.06
5 wickets in innings	–	17
10 wickets in match	–	5
Best bowling	–	8/43
Catches/stumpings	2/–	170/3
- Source: CricketArchive, 1 July 2016

George Frederick Grace (13 December 1850 – 22 September 1880) was an English first-class cricketer active from 1866 to 1880 who played for Gloucestershire and the United South of England Eleven (USEE). He played in one retrospectively recognised Test match for England. He was born in Downend, near Bristol and died in Basingstoke, Hampshire. A right-handed batsman who bowled right arm fast roundarm, he appeared in 195 matches that are generally rated first-class for statistical purposes. (Note: "First-class cricket" was officially defined in May 1894 by a meeting at Lord's of Marylebone Cricket Club (MCC) and the county clubs which were then competing in the County Championship. The ruling was effective from the beginning of the 1895 season. Pre-1895 matches of the same standard have no official definition of status because the ruling is not retrospective and the "unofficial first-class" designation, as applied to a given match, is based on the views of one or more substantial historical sources. For further information, see First-class cricket, Forms of cricket and History of cricket.) In these matches, Grace scored 6,906 runs with a highest score of 189*. An outstanding fielder and occasional wicket-keeper, he held 170 catches and completed three stumpings. He took 329 wickets with a best performance of eight for 43.

Fred Grace was the youngest member of the Grace family. He had four elder brothers who all played cricket: Henry, Alfred, "EM" and "WG". In some contemporary texts, he was called "G. F. Grace", using his initials in the same way as for both EM and WG but in fact he was widely known as Fred while they were always known by their initials only. His two oldest brothers were always known by their first names, Henry and Alfred.

Although the England v Australia match at The Oval in September 1880 was granted Test status retrospectively, it is the first instance of three brothers playing together in a Test match with EM, WG and Fred all members of England. Grace was always praised for his fielding and, in that Test match, he held what has been called "the most famous deep field catch in history". During the match, he developed a cold which, because he was exposed to wet weather over the next few days, escalated to pneumonia. He died, aged 29, only two weeks after playing for England.

== Career ==
=== Learning the game ===
Like his brothers, Grace learned how to play cricket at home on a practice pitch that the family had created on the site of a former orchard. He was coached by his father, Dr Henry Grace, and his uncle, Alfred Pocock. His mother, Martha, was a keen participant too and she provided the driving force and the motivation which crystallised into the competitive edge that EM, WG and Fred always had as first-class players. EM, several years older than WG and Fred, learned to play using a full size bat and, because it was too big for him as a boy, he developed a tendency to hit across the line of delivery instead of playing straight. Alfred Pocock recognised this fault and decided that WG and Fred must learn to play straight by using small bats, suitable for their boyhood sizes. It meant that WG and Fred became technically correct batsmen with strong defensive techniques whereas EM remained primarily an attacking batsman.

In his Cricketing Reminiscences (1899), W. G. Grace emphasised that "cricketers are made by coaching and practice", but he and his brothers were born "in the atmosphere of cricket". Their parents and uncle were "full of enthusiasm for the game" and it was "a common theme of conversation at home". It was in the Downend orchard and as members of their local cricket clubs that Grace and his brothers developed their skills, mainly under the tutelage of Alfred Pocock, who was an exceptional coach. Apart from their cricket and schooling, the brothers lived in the country and roamed freely with other village boys. One of their regular activities, to help local farmers, was stone throwing at birds in the fields and WG later claimed that this was the source of their eventual skills as outfielders. Fred Grace, in particular, became an outstanding fielder.

Grace first attracted notice in club cricket, playing for his father's West Gloucestershire Cricket Club in 1864 when still only 13. Despite his coaching, it was said of him then that he did not play with so "straight a bat" as WG, but was "more resolute in his hitting". Mention was made of the great promise shown in his fielding, always an outstanding feature of his game; he was hailed as "a glorious field". Grace's height was about 5 ft 10in, so he was three inches taller than EM and four inches shorter than WG.

His earliest appearance in a match now rated first-class was Monday, 21 to Tuesday, 22 May 1866 at the Magdalen Ground, Oxford for a hastily organised Gentlemen of England against Oxford University (OUCC), the university winning by 10 wickets. Aged 15, Grace took a wicket and had scores of 0 and 10. WG, aged 17, was in the same team and it was at this match that WG received an invitation from Edmund Carter to join the OUCC, but he had to refuse because his father intended him for medical school. In due course, Fred would follow him into the study of medicine.

=== Gloucestershire becomes a first-class county ===
On Thursday, 25 June 1868, Grace played for the new Gloucestershire County Cricket Club in its first-ever match, which was a two-day game at Lord's against Marylebone Cricket Club (MCC). His brothers EM and WG were in the same team but the match was by no means first-class. Gloucestershire won by 134 runs. The county club was not actually new because it had pre-existed for over twenty years as the West Gloucestershire Cricket Club, based in Bristol and effectively run by the Grace family. It renamed itself as the county club in 1867 but it did not have a county-wide remit because of a rival club called the Cheltenham and Gloucestershire Cricket Club.

It is generally agreed that the inaugural first-class match played by Gloucestershire County Cricket Club, per se, was against Surrey at Durdham Down, Clifton from Wednesday, 2 to Friday, 4 June 1870. EM, WG and Fred Grace all played for Gloucestershire who won by 51 runs. Grace bowled well, taking four for 56 and four for 31. He scored 16 (hit wicket) and 15 which were useful runs in a low-scoring (<500) match. The county club has always dated its foundation to 1870 (it celebrated its centenary in 1970) but its formal constitution was not completed until March 1871 when it finally merged with the Cheltenham and Gloucestershire.

=== 1870 – an established player ===
With Gloucestershire now a first-class county, Grace set about establishing himself as a first-class player. Like EM and WG, he was a genuine all-rounder. On Thursday, 14 July, Grace made his debut for the Gentlemen in the prestigious Gentlemen v Players fixture at The Oval. He failed with the bat and scored two ducks but he succeeded with the ball. After the Gentlemen had scored 198, the Players struggled and were dismissed for 148 with Grace taking five for 38. It was the first time he captured five wickets in a first-class innings (his previous best was his four for 31 in the county match against Surrey). The Gentlemen's second innings belonged to WG who hit 215, well supported by Walter Money with 109*. They totalled 513 but didn't leave themselves time to bowl the Players out. Although Grace again bowled well, taking three for 9 in 15 overs, the Players with 109 for four held on for the draw.

From Thursday, 18 to Saturday, 20 August 1870, Grace played alongside WG for the Gentlemen of the South against the Gentlemen of the North at Meadow Road, Beeston. The North, captained by WG's long-time rival A. N. Hornby, won the toss and decided to bat first. They scored 287, WG taking six for 89 and Fred one for 53 (Hornby scored 103). The South were 6 for one at close of play on Thursday. WG, who opened the innings, went on to make 77 on Friday morning, sharing a third wicket partnership of 122 with Isaac Walker. When he was out, Fred came in to join Walker and came of age as a cricketer. They shared a stand of 294 for the fourth wicket, broken when Walker was out for 179. There was then something of a collapse as the South went from 430 for four to 482 all out just before the close. Fred scored 189 not out and that remained his career-highest innings. On the final day, the North managed to avoid the innings defeat and amassed 289 (WG three for 83; Fred two for 61) to ensure a draw. Prior to this match, Grace's highest score was 33. As Eric Midwinter put it, "here was another cricketing talent to be nurtured".

=== 1871 ===
Grace had made his debut in the North v South match in 1870 but without much success. Although this fixture did not quite equal Gentlemen v Players in terms of prestige, it was nevertheless the standout event in the pre-international programme because, in theory, it featured all of the best players in England as they were chosen on technical ability alone, not on status. Grace and WG won the game for the South at Lord's in May 1871 when they shared a fourth wicket partnership of 170. WG scored 178, Grace 83 and the next best was 22 by Harry Jupp in a total of 328 which was enough for the South to win by an innings and 49 runs (Grace did not bowl).

=== Controversies ===
There was always controversy surrounding Grace's elder brothers EM and WG about the money they, as nominal amateurs, made from cricket. Grace himself was once barred from a Gentlemen v Players match because of match fees he had claimed for appearances with the USEE.

=== Tour of Australia, 1873–74 ===
The English cricket team in Australia in 1873–74 is sometimes called W. G. Grace's XI. The Melbourne Club had invited WG to form a team for the tour. There were several refusals but eventually a team including Fred Grace, Walter Gilbert, Harry Jupp, James Lillywhite, William Oscroft and James Southerton boarded the P&O steamer Mirzapore at Southampton and sailed to Melbourne where they received a rapturous welcome. Then it all turned sour.

=== Grace and the 1880 Australian tour ===
In the aftermath of the Sydney Riot of 1879, cricketing relations between England and Australia were strained and the 1880 Australian tourists had difficulty arranging fixtures. The establishment at Lord's, spearheaded by Lord Harris, had effectively embargoed them and they only played four first-class matches from May to August but many more against local club teams. They were most welcome in the north of England but one southern player who had faith in them was Fred Grace. Operating on a freelance basis for a match fee, he played against the Australians in their opening match for a club team in Southampton and then for three others in Manchester, Northampton and Harrogate. Importantly for the Australians, Grace was a go-between from them to WG who, in the words of Malcolm Knox, "did not belong to (any Lord's) clique". WG, as always, was pragmatically alert to financial opportunity and offered them a match against Gloucestershire. This broke the Lord's embargo and Harris soon relented.

The Gloucestershire v Australians match took place Monday, 2 to Wednesday, 3 August at the Clifton College Close Ground and the Australians won by 68 runs. All the Grace brothers and Billy Midwinter played for Gloucestershire but, with eleven wickets, Fred Spofforth won the game for the Australians. It was a big match both on the day and in terms of its legacy. Knox says that Gloucestershire treated it "as an international" and a huge crowd attended. In the longer term, it convinced first the Graces and then Harris that international cricket was the way forward and negotiations began to ensure that such a match took place that summer.

Grace was selected along with EM and WG to play for England at The Oval. The match was played Monday, 6 to Wednesday, 8 September and was later recognised as the inaugural Test in England. Grace was out for nought in both innings and so became, albeit retrospectively, the first player to be dismissed for a pair on Test debut. He made his mark on the match by holding a celebrated, and possibly match-winning, catch on the boundary in front of the gasometer at the Vauxhall End. This was from a shot by the giant Australian batsman George Bonnor off Alfred Shaw. Bonnor hit the ball so high that he and his partner Harry Boyle had turned for their third run before, finally, the ball came down to Grace who had positioned himself perfectly to catch it cleanly. That catch became part of cricket's folklore and has been described as "the most famous deep field catch in history".

== Death ==
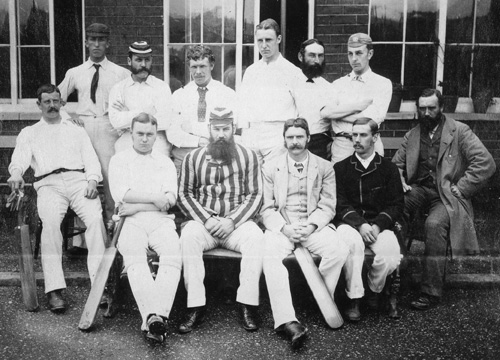
The Gloucestershire team in 1880 shortly before Fred Grace's untimely death. Fred Grace (hooped cap) is third left in rear group. W. G. Grace is seated front left centre. Billy Midwinter (directly behind WG) is fourth left in rear (next to Fred). E. M. Grace (bearded) is sixth left in rear.

The Test match ended with an England victory on Wednesday, 8 September. Grace went to Stroud for a USEE "odds" match played on 9 to 11 September. It was his last cricket match. He had caught a cold during the Test match which was made worse by being soaked twice during showers at Stroud. He returned home to Downend to try and recuperate but still had the cold on Tuesday, 14 September, when he travelled by train to Basingstoke as he was due to play in a benefit match at Winchester the following day. He took a room at the Red Lion Hotel in Basingstoke. He could not play in the benefit match because his condition had worsened and he became bed-ridden at the hotel where a doctor diagnosed a problem with his right lung. Grace's brother Henry and his cousin Walter Gilbert came to see him, Gilbert remaining with him throughout his illness. There were conflicting reports by telegram about his condition until the morning of Wednesday, 22 September, when he suddenly deteriorated and became critical. Several family members, including WG, set off for Basingstoke but Grace died at 13:15 that day. WG and Henry were told of his death while awaiting a train at Bradford-on-Avon railway station.

The cause of death, though given as "congestion of the lungs", was pneumonia. Grace was buried in the cemetery at Downend and an estimated 3,000 people followed his coffin. The Australians wore black armbands during their last match which began on the day of the funeral. The Times wrote: "His manly and straightforward conduct and genial manners won him not only popularity, but the esteem of hosts and friends".

It has been alleged that Grace's illness developed "after sleeping in a damp hotel bed". Gilbert, who stayed at the hotel for several days, later wrote to The Daily Telegraph: "It having come to my knowledge there is a rumour abroad that Mr. G. F. Grace's fatal illness was caused by sleeping in a damp bed at the Red Lion Hotel, Basingstoke, I beg to contradict it. He had a bad cold before he left home, and on my arrival at Basingstoke he told me that he had received another chill whilst waiting at Reading Station. By inserting this you will greatly oblige me, and also do justice to the members of a family whose attention and kindness to my cousin all through his illness could not have been surpassed had he been at home". The "damp bed" story is refuted by evidence to the contrary, as described above, because Grace's illness began with the cold he caught during the match at The Oval and he was already ill when he arrived in Basingstoke.

== Legacy ==
As a team, Gloucestershire declined in the 1880s following its heady success in the 1870s and one of the stated reasons for this was Fred Grace's early death, there being a view that "the county was never quite the same without him". Writing about the Graces in Barclays World of Cricket, Ronald Mason said of Fred that he "is visible only as through a glass darkly, as after a youth of great promise and pride he was smitten with sudden illness and died (aged only 29)".

Fred Grace was unquestionably a top-class cricketer through the 1870s but, like everyone else, he was overshadowed by WG, to whom he was especially close. Bernard Darwin wrote that Fred was the sibling (they were in a family of nine) to whom WG "was most devoted" and Fred's death created a "real and permanent gap" in WG's life. In his classic work, Beyond a Boundary, C. L. R. James observed that the three Grace brothers were a "clan", unlike other sets of cricketing brothers. James concluded that WG was "close enough" to EM but he felt the death of Fred more than other bereavements. The brothers were linked together but they were three individuals and, in character terms, there was polarity between EM and Fred with WG in between. EM, says James, "was a card" but Fred was "thoughtful and reserved".

== Bibliography ==
- Altham, H. S. (1962). A History of Cricket, Volume 1 (to 1914). George Allen & Unwin.
- Arlott, John (1984). Arlott on Cricket. Collins. ISBN 0-563-16115-9.
- Barclays (1986). Swanton, E. W. (ed.). Barclays World of Cricket. Willow Books. ISBN 0-00-218193-2.
- Birley, Derek (1999). A Social History of English Cricket. Aurum. ISBN 1-85410-710-0.
- Darwin, Bernard (1934). W. G. Grace. Duckworth. ISBN 0-7156-1037-6.
- James, C. L. R. (1963). Beyond A Boundary. Hutchinson. ISBN 0822313839.
- Knox, Malcolm (2012). Never A Gentleman's Game. Hardie Grant. ISBN 978-1-7427-0193-6.
- Major, John (2007). More Than A Game. London: HarperCollins. ISBN 978-0-00-718364-7.
- Midwinter, Eric (1981). W G Grace: His Life and Times. George Allen and Unwin. ISBN 978-0-04-796054-3.
- Rae, Simon (1998). W.G. Grace: A Life. Faber & Faber. ISBN 978-0-571-17855-1.
- Thomson, A. A. (1968) [1957]. The Great Cricketer. The Cricketer; Hutchinson. ISBN 0-09087-310-6.
