= E. M. Grace =

English cricketer

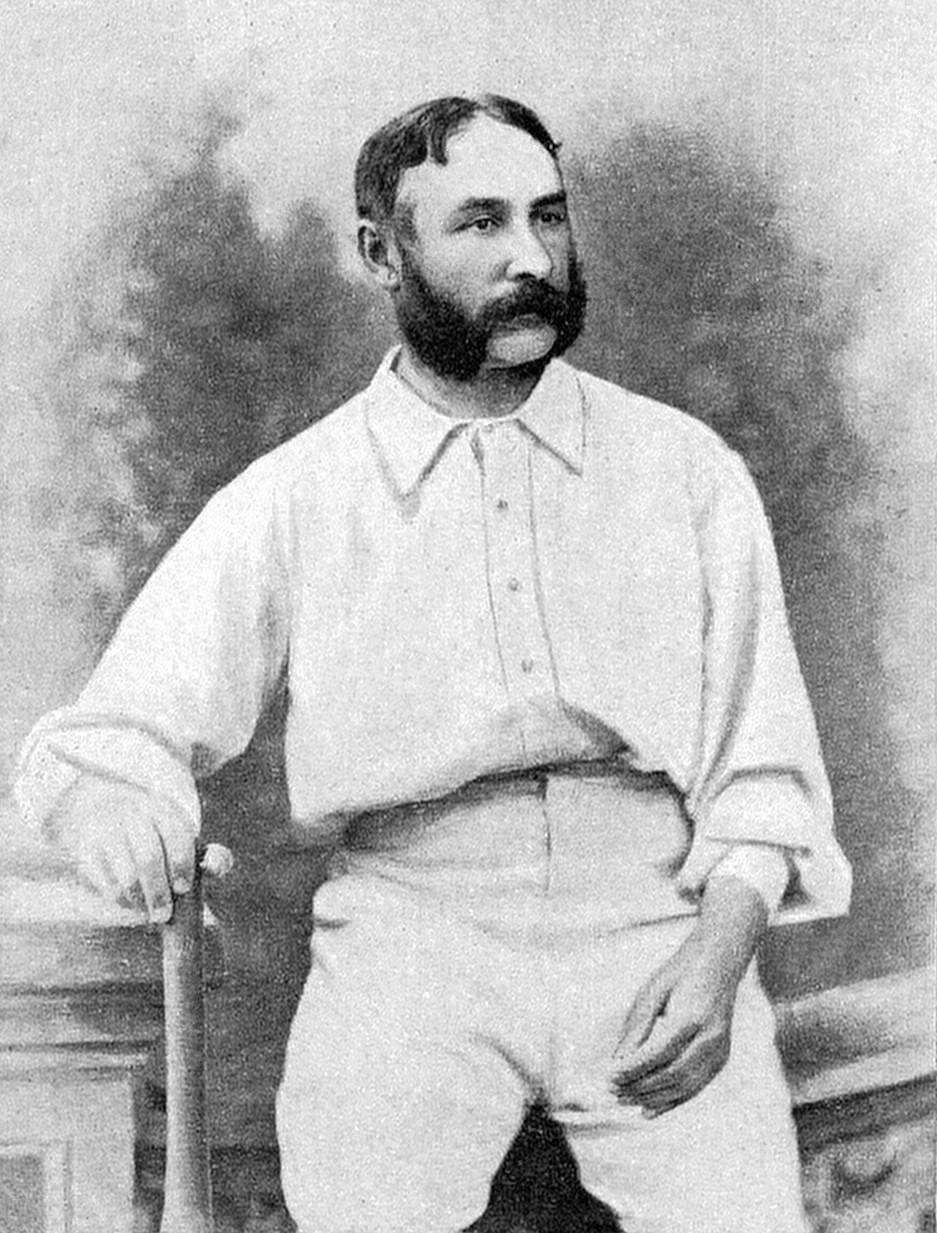

Personal information
- Full name: Edward Mills Grace
- Born: 28 November 1841; Downend, near Bristol
- Died: 20 May 1911 (aged 69); Thornbury, Gloucestershire
- Nickname: The Coroner
- Batting: Right-handed
- Bowling: Right arm slow (underarm)
- Role: All-rounder
- Relatives: Norman Grace (son); W. G. Grace (brother); Fred Grace (brother); Walter Gilbert (cousin)

International information
- National side: England
- Only Test (cap 22): 6 September 1880 v Australia

Domestic team information
- Years: Team
- 1870–1896: Gloucestershire

Career statistics
Competition	Test	FC
Matches	1	314
Runs scored	36	10,025
Batting average	18.00	18.66
100s/50s	0/0	5/44
Top score	36	192 not out
Balls bowled	0	13,441
Wickets	–	305
Bowling average	–	20.37
5 wickets in innings	–	17
10 wickets in match	–	2
Best bowling	–	10/69
Catches/stumpings	1/–	369/1
- Source: Cricinfo, 1 October 2009

Edward Mills Grace (28 November 1841 – 20 May 1911) was an English cricketer in the second half of the 19th century who was an all-rounder, batting right-handed and bowling slow right arm underarm. He played for Gloucestershire County Cricket Club and was the elder brother of W. G. and Fred Grace. All three played for England against Australia in September 1880 two weeks before Fred Grace died. Always known by his initials, E. M. Grace controversially held amateur status but was criticised for the money he made by playing.

== Life ==
E. M. Grace was born on Sunday, 28 November 1841 in Downend, near Bristol. He was one of the great cricketers of the 1860s and 1870s, though he was overshadowed by his younger brother W. G. He was called Ted by the Grace family but elsewhere by his initials only.

Grace performed one of the most amazing all-round feats ever on 15 August 1862. He carried his bat through the entire MCC innings, scoring 192 not out of a total of 344. He then took all 10 wickets in the Kent first innings for 69 runs. It is not an official record as it was a 12-a-side game.

After the 1863 season, Grace toured America with George Parr's team, but he did not perform well, being hampered by a bad hand. He then travelled to Australia on the SS Great Britain with the All-England Eleven. Grace kept a diary of the voyage which is part of the collection held by the SS Great Britain Trust. The team played several matches in Australia before travelling to New Zealand where they played five games. They returned to Australia to complete the remainder of the 19 tour matches.

Grace then withdrew from cricket while he qualified as a surgeon, but returned on the formation of Gloucestershire County Cricket Club in 1871, of which he was secretary until his resignation in 1909. Thanks mainly to the combined efforts of the Grace brothers, Gloucestershire became the (unofficial) champion county in 1874, 1876 and 1877; they also shared the title in 1873.

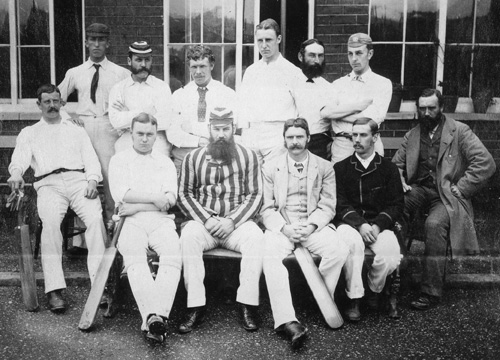
Gloucestershire County Cricket Club in 1880 shortly before Fred Grace's untimely death. W. G. Grace is seated front left centre. Fred Grace (hooped cap) is third left in rear group. Billy Midwinter (directly behind WG) is fourth left in rear. E. M. Grace (bearded) is sixth left in rear.

All three brothers were selected for the first Test match played in England, which was at the Oval in 1880. This remains the only instance of three brothers playing for England in the same Test. Grace finally dropped out of the Gloucestershire first team in 1896, aged 54, but he continued playing club cricket for Thornbury until 1909, despite increasing lameness.

Grace scored 10,025 runs at an average of 18.66, with 5 hundreds. He took 305 wickets at 20.37. However it was once calculated that, in all matches, his career tallies amounted to 12,078 wickets and 76,760 runs. In the 1863 season alone he managed 339 wickets and 3,074 runs.

Grace's nickname was "The Coroner", since he was coroner for the lower division of Gloucestershire. He was married four times and sired eighteen children. One of his cases in 1882 was the death by a fall of architect John Henry Hirst. His first wife, Annie, was born at Demarara. Their eldest daughter, Annie, was labelled a dumb imbecile. By 1881, they had at least six other daughters: Edith, Florie, Mina, Sarah, Alice and Sybil; and three sons Edward, Francis and Norman. His daughter Mina Gertrude Grace married stockbroker Henry Willis, son of the cricketer Henry Willis. He died 20 May 1911 in Thornbury, Gloucestershire, England.

Preceded by Tom Emmett	Oldest living Test cricketer 30 June 1904 – 20 May 1911	Succeeded by James Lillywhite
