= W. G. Grace =

English cricketer (1848–1915)

W. G. Grace MRCS LRCP
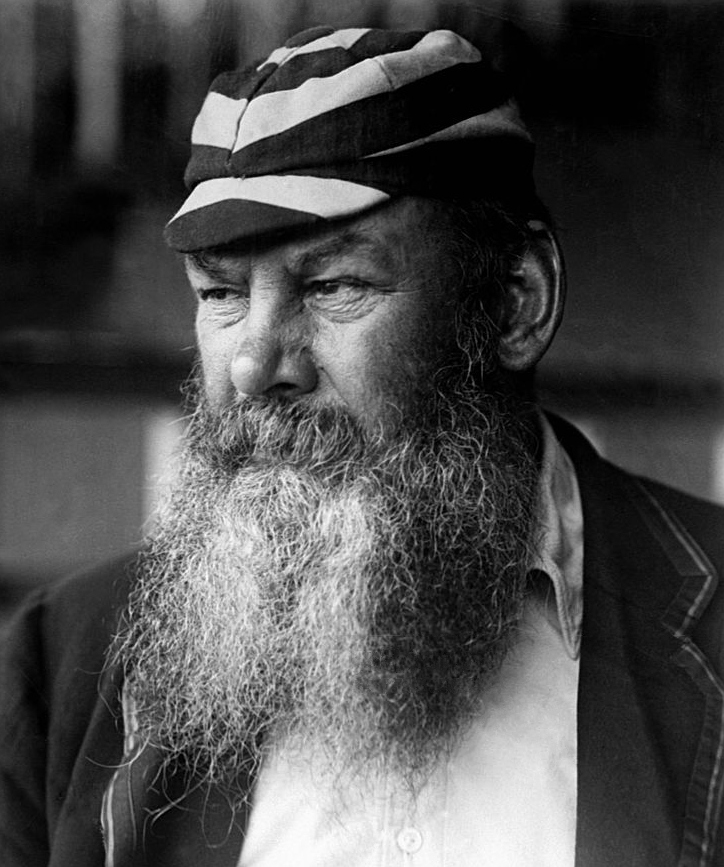
- Grace photographed by George Beldam, c. 1902

Personal information
- Full name: William Gilbert Grace
- Born: 18 July 1848; Downend, near Bristol
- Died: 23 October 1915 (aged 67); Mottingham, Kent
- Nickname: WG, The Champion
- Batting: Right-handed
- Bowling: Right-arm medium (roundarm)
- Role: All-rounder
- Relatives: E. M. Grace (brother); Fred Grace (brother)

International information
- National side: England (1880–1899)
- Test debut (cap 24): 6 September 1880 v Australia
- Last Test: 1 June 1899 v Australia

Domestic team information
- Years: Team
- 1865–1906: Gentlemen
- 1866–1878: USEE
- 1869–1904: MCC
- 1870–1899: Gloucestershire
- 1900–1904: London County

Career statistics
Competition	Test	FC
Matches	22	870 (Note: There has been a statistical issue regarding the perceived status of certain matches that Grace played in before 1890. For example, Grace himself regarded the 1864 South Wales matches as first-class. An accord was reached in 2022 when Wisden Cricketers' Almanack aligned its statistics with those of other sources. Broadly, the term "first-class" came into common use from around 1864, when overarm bowling was legalised, and was formally defined as a standard by a meeting at Lord's, in May 1894, of Marylebone Cricket Club (MCC) and the county clubs which were then competing in the County Championship. The ruling was effective from the beginning of the 1895 season, but pre-1895 matches of the same standard have no official definition of status because the ruling is not retrospective. However, matches of a similar standard since the beginning of the 1864 season are generally considered to have an unofficial first-class status.)
Runs scored	1,098	54,211
Batting average	32.29	39.45
100s/50s	2/5	124/251
Top score	170	344
Balls bowled	666	124,833
Wickets	9	2,809
Bowling average	26.22	18.14
5 wickets in innings	0	240
10 wickets in match	0	64
Best bowling	2/12	10/49
Catches/stumpings	39/–	876/5
- Source: Cricket Archive, 20 December 2024

William Gilbert Grace (18 July 1848 – 23 October 1915) was an English cricketer who is widely held to have been one of the sport's all-time greatest players. Always known by his initials as "WG", his first-class career spanned a record-equalling 44 seasons from 1865 to 1908. Test cricket originated during his career, and he represented England in 22 matches from 1880 to 1899. In domestic cricket, he was mostly associated with Gloucestershire, the Gentlemen, Marylebone Cricket Club (MCC), and the United South of England Eleven (USEE).

Right-handed as both a batsman and bowler, Grace was an all-rounder who excelled in all the essential disciplines of batting, bowling and fielding. It is, however, for his batting that he is most renowned, and he is widely regarded as the originator of modern batsmanship. He dominated the sport throughout his career, and his technical innovations and immense influence left a lasting legacy. Usually opening the innings, he was especially admired for his complete command of every stroke; contemporary reviewers frequently described his level of expertise as unparalleled. Because of his skill and tactical acumen, he generally served as captain of the teams he represented at all levels.

Grace nominally held amateur status as a player, but he was said to have made more money from his cricketing activities than any contemporary professional. He was an extremely competitive player and, though one of the most famous men in England, he was also one of the most controversial on account of his gamesmanship and moneymaking.

He came from a cricketing family, which included his elder brother Edward ("EM") and his younger brother Fred. In 1880, they were members of the same England team, the first time three brothers played together in a Test match. Grace took part in other sports—as a young man, he was a champion 440-yard hurdler and played football for the Wanderers. In later life, he developed enthusiasm for golf, lawn bowls, and curling. He qualified as a medical practitioner in 1879.

== Early years ==
=== Family ===
Grace was born in Downend, near Bristol, on 18 July 1848 at his parents' home, Downend House, and was baptised at the local church on 8 August. He was called Gilbert in the family circle, except by his mother, who apparently called him Willie, but otherwise, as "W. G.", he was universally known by his initials. His parents were Henry Mills Grace and Martha (née Pocock), who were married in Bristol on Thursday, 3 November 1831 and lived out their lives at Downend, where Henry Grace was the local GP. Downend is near Mangotsfield and, although it is now a suburb of Bristol, it was then a detached village surrounded by countryside, and about four miles from Bristol. Henry and Martha Grace had nine children in all. Biographer Simon Rae commented that this was "the same number as Victoria and Albert — and in every respect they were the typical Victorian family". Grace was the eighth child in the family; he had three older brothers, including Edward (always known as "E. M."), and four older sisters. The ninth child was his younger brother Fred, born in 1850.

=== Education ===
Grace was "notoriously unscholarly". His first schooling was with a Miss Trotman in Downend village and then with a Mr Curtis of Winterbourne. He subsequently attended a day school called Ridgway House, run by a Mr Malpas, until he was fourteen. One of his schoolmasters, David Bernard, later married Grace's sister Alice. In 1863, Grace was taken seriously ill with pneumonia, and his father removed him from Ridgway House. After this illness, Grace grew rapidly to his full height of 6 ft 2 in (1.88 m). He continued his education at home, where one of his tutors was the Reverend John Dann, the Downend parish church curate; like Mr Bernard before him, Mr Dann became Grace's brother-in-law, marrying Blanche Grace in 1869.

Grace never went to university, because his father wanted him to pursue a medical career. Nevertheless, Grace received approaches from both Oxford University Cricket Club and Cambridge University Cricket Club. In 1866, when he played a match at Oxford, one of the Oxford players, Edmund Carter, tried to interest him in becoming an undergraduate. Then, in 1868, Grace received overtures from Caius College, Cambridge, which had a long medical tradition. Grace said he would have gone to either Oxford or Cambridge if his father had allowed it. Instead, he enrolled at Bristol Medical School in October 1868, when he was 20.

Grace's entire life, including his cricket and medical careers, is inseparable from his close-knit family background, which was strongly influenced by his father, who set great store by qualifications and determination to succeed. Henry, whose medical qualifications were Licenciate of the Society of Apothecaries (LSA) in 1828 and Membership of the Royal College of Surgeons (MRCS) in 1830, passed this purposeful attitude on to each of his five sons. Therefore, like his father and his brothers, Grace chose a professional career in medicine. Because of his cricketing commitments, however, he did not complete his qualification as a doctor until 1879, when he was 31 years old.

=== Development as a cricketer ===
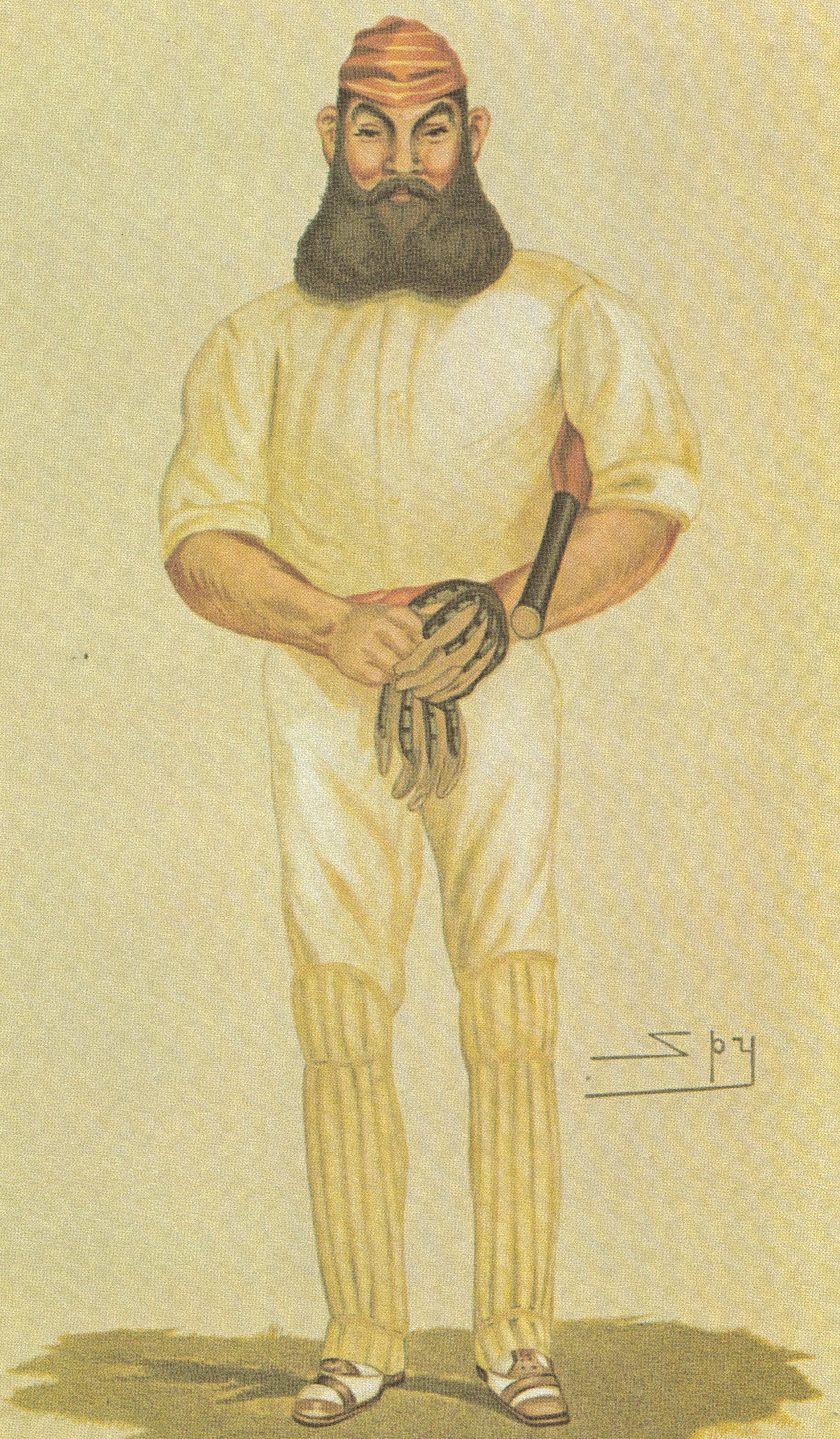
An 1877 illustration of Grace by Leslie Ward in Vanity Fair emphasises his trademark beard and MCC cap.

Grace began his Cricketing Reminiscences (1899) by answering a question he had frequently been asked—"was he born a cricketer"? His answer was in the negative because he believed that "cricketers are made by coaching and practice", though he added that if he was not born a cricketer, he was born "in the atmosphere of cricket". His father and mother were "full of enthusiasm for the game" and it was "a common theme of conversation at home". In 1850, when W. G. was two and Fred was expected, the family moved to a nearby house called "The Chesnuts", which had a sizeable orchard, and Henry Grace organised clearance of this to establish a practice pitch. All nine children in the Grace family, including the four daughters, were encouraged to play cricket; however, the girls, along with the dogs, were required for fielding only. Grace claimed that he first handled a cricket bat at the age of two.

It was in the Downend orchard and as members of their local cricket clubs that he and his brothers developed their skills, mainly under the tutelage of their uncle, Alfred Pocock, who spent long hours coaching them at Downend. E. M., who was seven years older than W. G., had always played with a full-size bat and so developed a tendency, that he never lost, to hit across the line, the bat being too big for him to "play straight". Pocock recognised this problem and determined that W. G. and Fred should not follow suit. He therefore fashioned smaller bats for them, to suit their sizes, and they were taught to play straight and "learn defence, with the left shoulder well forward", before attempting to hit. Apart from his cricket and his schooling, Grace lived the life of a country boy and roamed freely with the other village boys. One of his regular activities was stone throwing at birds in the fields and he later claimed that this was the source of his eventual skill as an outfielder.

Henry Grace founded Mangotsfield Cricket Club in 1845 to represent several neighbouring villages including Downend. In 1846, this club merged with the West Gloucestershire Cricket Club whose name was adopted until 1867; it has been said that the Grace family ran the West Gloucestershire "almost as a private club". Henry Grace managed to organise matches against Lansdown Cricket Club in Bath, which was the premier West Country club. West Gloucestershire fared poorly in these games and, sometime in the 1850s, Henry Grace and Alfred Pocock decided to join Lansdown, although they continued to run the West Gloucestershire and this remained their primary club.

Grace recorded in his Reminiscences that he saw his first "great" cricket match in 1854 when he was barely six years old, the occasion being a game between the All England Eleven (the AEE) and twenty-two of West Gloucestershire. He first played for the West Gloucestershire club himself as early as 1857, when he was nine years old, and he had eleven innings in 1859. The first time he made a substantial score was in July 1860 when he scored 51 for West Gloucestershire against Clifton—forty years later, he said no innings ever gave him more pleasure.

It was through Grace's elder brother EM, however, that the family name first became famous. Their mother, Martha, wrote the following in a letter to William Clarke's successor George Parr in 1860 or 1861:

I am writing to ask you to consider the inclusion of my son, E. M. Grace—a splendid hitter and most excellent catch—in your England Eleven. I am sure he would play very well and do the team much credit. It may interest you to learn that I have another son, now twelve years of age, who will in time be a much better player than his brother because his back stroke is sounder, and he always plays with a straight bat.

Grace was just short of his thirteenth birthday when, on 5 July 1861, he made his debut for Lansdown and played two matches that month. EM had made his debut in 1857, aged sixteen. In August 1862, aged 14, Grace played for West Gloucestershire against a Devonshire team. A year later, following the bout of pneumonia which had left him bed-ridden for several weeks, he scored 52 not out and took five wickets to help Gentlemen of Gloucestershire defeat Gentlemen of Somerset by 87 runs at the Sydenham Field ground in Bath. Soon afterwards, he was one of four family members who played for a Bristol and Didcot XVIII against the All England Eleven. He scored 32 off the bowling of John Jackson, George Tarrant, Cris Tinley, and Ned Willsher—before Tinley bowled him. EM took ten wickets in the match, which Bristol and Didcot won by an innings, and as a result EM was invited to tour Australia a few months later with George Parr's England team.

EM did not return from Australia until July 1864 and his absence presented Grace with an opportunity to appear on cricket's greatest stages. He and his elder brother Henry were invited to play for the South Wales team which had arranged a series of matches in London and Sussex, though Grace wondered humorously how they were qualified to represent South Wales. It was the first time that Grace left the West Country and he made his debut appearances at both The Oval and Lord's.

Besides his cricketing skills, Grace was an outstanding athlete as a young man and took part in several meetings. He threw a cricket ball 122 yards (112 m) during a field event at Eastbourne. He won the 440 yards (400 m) hurdling title at the National Olympian Games at Crystal Palace in August 1866, and claimed the silver medal in the quarter-mile event at the 1869 AAC Championships. Also, Grace is known to have played football for the Wanderers, although he did not feature in any of their FA Cup–winning teams.

== First-class career ==
=== Gentlemen v Players ===
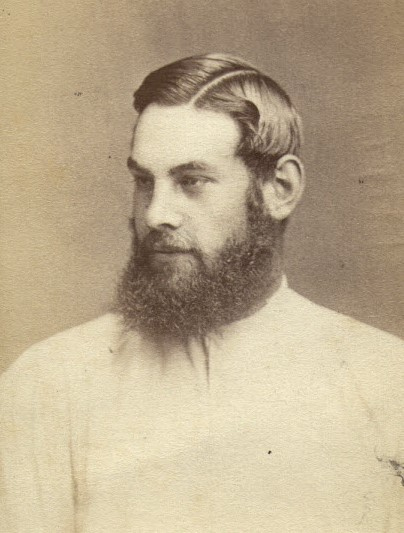
Grace as a young man

Having scored 5 and 38 for South Wales in his first match at The Oval, Grace was outstanding in the next match, scoring 170 and 56* against Gentlemen of Sussex at the Royal Brunswick Ground in Hove. The innings of 170 was his first-ever century in a serious match. The third match, against Marylebone Cricket Club (MCC) was Grace's debut at Lord's, and he was joined there by EM who had just disembarked from his voyage. Grace scored 50 in the first innings, only three days after his sixteenth birthday.

His name now well known in cricketing circles, Grace played for Gentlemen of the South against Players of the South in June 1865, when he was still only 16 but already 6 ft 2 in (1.88 m) tall and weighing 11 st (70 kg). This match is recognised as his first-class debut. Gentlemen of the South, batting first, won the match by an innings and 58 runs. Grace was out, stumped, without scoring but he bowled extremely well and had match figures of 13 for 84 to earn his first selection for the Gentlemen v Players fixture.

During this period, before the start of Test cricket in 1877, Gentlemen v Players was the most prestigious fixture in which a player could take part. This is apart from North v South, which was technically a fixture of higher quality given that the amateur Gentlemen were usually (until Grace took a hand) outclassed by the professional Players. Grace was to represent the Gentlemen in their matches against the Players from 1865 to 1906. It was he who enabled the amateurs to meet the paid professionals on level terms and to defeat them more often than not. His ability to master fast bowling was the key factor. Before Grace's debut in the fixture, the Gentlemen had lost 19 consecutive games; of the next 39 games, they won 27 and lost only 4. In seven consecutive innings against the Players from 1871 to 1873, Grace scored 217, 77, 112, 117, 163, 158 and 70. In his whole career, he scored a record 15 centuries in the fixture.

His 1865 debut for the Gentlemen did not turn the tide as the Players won at The Oval by 118 runs. He had been selected as a bowler and took seven wickets in the match. Batting late in the order, he scored 23 and 12*. In the second 1865 match, this time at Lord's, the Gentlemen finally ended their losing streak and won by 8 wickets, but it was EM who made the difference with 11 wickets in the match. Even so, Grace made his mark by scoring 34 out of 77/2 in the second innings to steer the Gentlemen to victory.

=== "The Champion" ===
Cricket in the 1860s underwent a revolution with the legalisation of overarm bowling in June 1864, and Grace himself said it was "no exaggeration to say that, between 1860 and 1870, English cricket passed through its most critical period" with the game in transition, and "it was quite a revolutionary period so far as its rules were concerned". He was still 15 when the 1864 season began and had turned 20 when he began his medical career by enrolling at Bristol Medical School on 7 October 1868. During those five seasons, and especially in 1866, he became widely recognised as the finest cricketer in England. Just after his eighteenth birthday in July 1866, he confirmed his potential with an innings of 224* for England against Surrey at The Oval. It was his maiden first-class century and, according to Harry Altham, he was "thenceforward the biggest name in cricket and the main spectator attraction with the successes (coming) thick and fast".

Two years later, Grace scored two centuries in a match, only the second time in cricket history that this is known to have been done, following William Lambert in 1817. Summarising the 1868 season, Simon Rae wrote that Grace was:

Now indisputably the cricketer of the age, the Champion.

Grace had numerous nicknames during his career, including "The Doctor" after he achieved his medical qualification, and "The Old Man" as he reached the veteran stage. "The Champion" was the most auspicious—in the poem At Lord's by Francis Thompson, he was hailed as "The Champion of the Centuries". Grace was first acclaimed as the "Champion Cricketer" by Lillywhite's Companion in recognition of his exploits in 1871.

=== MCC membership ===
Grace became a member of MCC in 1869 after being proposed by the treasurer, Thomas Burgoyne, and seconded by the secretary, Robert Allan Fitzgerald. Given an ongoing rift in the sport during the 1860s between the northern professionals and Surrey, MCC feared the loss of its authority should Grace "throw in his lot with the professionals" so it was considered vital for them and their interests to get him onside. As it happens, the dispute was nearly over but it has been said that "MCC regained its authority over the game by hanging onto WG's shirt-tails". Grace wore MCC colours for the rest of his career, playing for them on an irregular basis until 1904, and their red and yellow hooped cap became as synonymous with him as his large black beard. He played for MCC on an expenses only basis, but any hopes the club had of keeping him firmly within the amateur ranks would soon be disappointed for his services were much in demand.

Grace scored four centuries in July 1869, including an innings of 180 at The Oval. That was achieved as part of the highest wicket partnership involving Grace in his entire career: he shared 283 runs for the first wicket with Bransby Cooper. Later in the month, Grace scored 122 out of 173 in difficult batting conditions during a North v South match at Bramall Lane, prompting the laconic Tom Emmett to call him a "nonsuch" (without equal), and declare: "He ought to be made to play with a littler bat".

=== Gloucestershire ===
It is generally understood that Gloucestershire County Cricket Club was formally constituted in 1870, having developed from Henry Grace's West Gloucestershire club. Gloucestershire acquired first-class status when its team played against Surrey at Durdham Down on 2, 3 and 4 June 1870. With Grace and his brothers EM and Fred playing, Gloucestershire won by 51 runs. The club soon had one of the best teams in England and was unanimously rated Champion County in 1876 and 1877, as well as sharing the unofficial title in 1873 and staking a claim for it in 1874. Surrey and Gloucestershire played a return match at The Oval in July 1870, and Gloucestershire won it by an innings and 129 runs. Grace scored 143, sharing a second wicket partnership of 234 with Frank Townsend, who scored 89. The Grace family "ran the show" at Gloucestershire and EM was chosen as secretary which, as Derek Birley pointed out, "put him in charge of expenses, a source of scandal that was to surface before the end of the decade". WG, though aged only 21, was from the start the team captain and Birley put that down to his "commercial drawing power".

Grace, a medical student at the time, was first on the scene in June 1870, when George Summers received the blow on the head that caused his death four days later. This was in the MCC v Nottinghamshire match at Lord's. Grace was fielding nearby when Summers was struck, and took his pulse. Summers recovered consciousness and Grace advised him to leave the field. Summers did not go to hospital, but it transpired later that his skull had been fractured. The Lord's pitch had a poor reputation for being rough, uneven, and unpredictable all through the 19th century and many players including Grace considered it dangerous.

It was in 1870 that, as Birley put it, Grace "scorned the puny modern fashion of moustaches" and grew the enormous black beard that made him so recognisable. In addition, his "ample girth" had developed, for he weighed 15 stone (95 kg) in his early twenties. Grace was a non-smoker, but he enjoyed good food and wine; many years later, when discussing the overheads incurred during Lord Sheffield's profitless tour of Australia in 1891–92, Arthur Shrewsbury commented: "I told you what wine would be drunk by the amateurs; Grace himself would drink enough to swim a ship".

=== Annus mirabilis ===
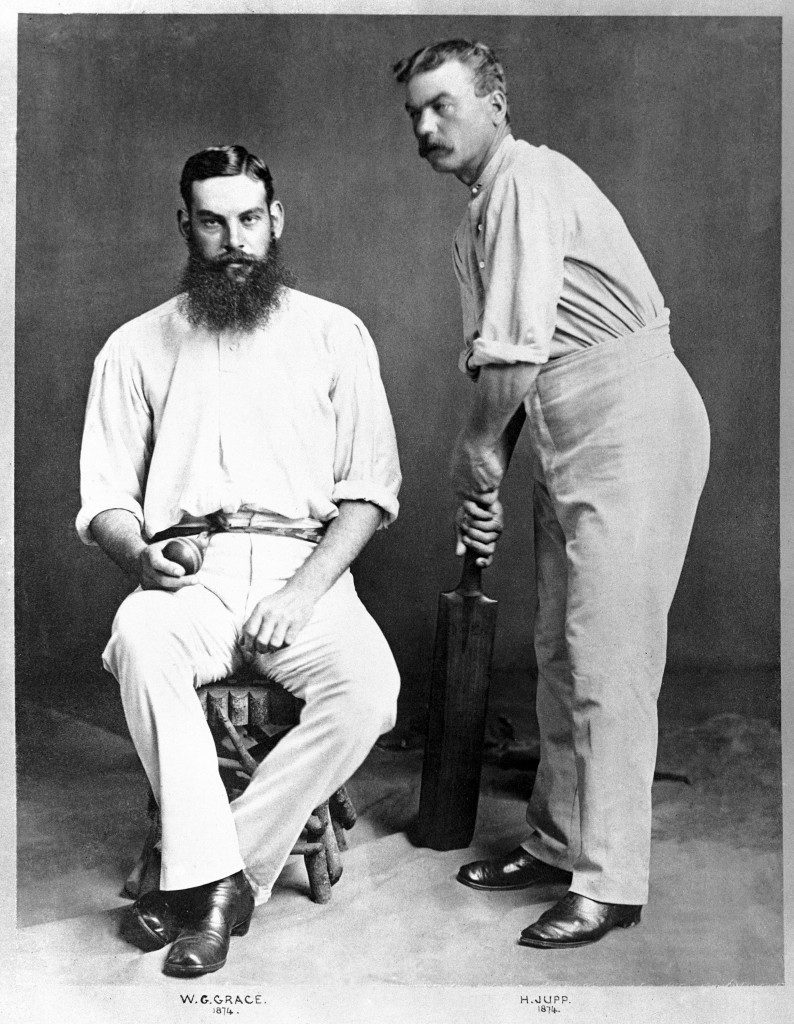
Grace with Harry Jupp of Surrey

According to Harry Altham, 1871 was Grace's annus mirabilis. In all first-class matches in 1871, a total of seventeen centuries were scored and Grace accounted for ten of them, including the first in a first-class match at Trent Bridge. He averaged 78.25 runs per innings, and the next best average by a batsman playing more than a single innings was 39.57, barely more than half his figure. His aggregate for the season was 2,739 runs—the first time anyone had scored 2,000 first-class runs in a season—and the next highest was Harry Jupp with 1,068.

Grace produced two outstanding batting performances in the season. Playing for the Single against the Married at Lord's, Grace carried his bat to score 189*. He and his brother Fred shared a third wicket partnership of 108. The innings was played on a "sticky wicket" after rain, and many people considered it the finest of Grace's career, though Grace himself disagreed. He began cautiously and took fifteen minutes to score his first run but then, as Rae put it, he "scored at a cracking pace". MCC Secretary Harry Perkins had no doubts and insisted that it was Grace's greatest-ever performance with rain frequently stopping play and making the wicket at times "unplayable". Later, when he represented the South against the North at The Oval, he made his highest career score to date of 268, having been dismissed by Jem Shaw for nought in the first innings. It was to no avail as the match was drawn, but the occasion produced a memorable and oft-quoted comment by Shaw who ruefully said: "I puts the ball where I likes, and he puts it where he likes".

=== The United South and the first overseas tour ===
1871 was a great year for Grace on the field, but it was marred by the death of his father in December. Grace and his younger brother Fred still lived with their mother, who had been left just enough to retain the family home in Downend. As medical students (Fred started his course in the autumn of 1872), the brothers faced considerable outlay in addition to their living expenses, and it became imperative for them to make what they could out of cricket, especially the United South of England Eleven (USEE).

USEE had been formed by Ned Willsher in 1865 but the heyday of the travelling teams was over and their organisers were desperate to feature new attractions. In 1872, USEE played six matches, including games in Edinburgh and Glasgow, Grace's first visit to Scotland.

The Graces had formally joined the club in 1870, playing for expenses only. As its match organisers, however, they also received wages. They had to find gaps in the first-class fixture list and then pull together a team to visit a location where a suitable profit could be made. It has been estimated that the standard fee paid to the USEE was £100 for a three-day match (equivalent to £29,300 in 2025), with £5 (£500) each going to the nine professionals in the team and the other £45 (£4400) to WG and Fred. Otherwise, Grace played for expenses; however, even these were loaded, as, for example, he is known to have claimed £15 per appearance for Gloucestershire and £20 for representing the Gentlemen. To put it in context, a domestic servant earned less than £50 a year.

1872 was a wet summer, and Grace ended his season in early August so that he could join a tour of North America. He made three overseas tours during his career, and this first one was to the United States and Canada with R. A. Fitzgerald's team in August and September 1872. All expenses were paid by the Montreal Club, who had written to Fitzgerald the previous winter and invited him to form a team. Grace and his all-amateur colleagues made short work of the weak teams they faced. The team included two other future England captains: A. N. Hornby, who became a rival of Grace in later years; and the Honourable George Harris, the future Lord Harris, who became a very close friend and a most useful ally. The team met in Liverpool on 8 August and sailed on the SS Sarmatian, docking at Quebec on 17 August. Rae recounted that the bond between Grace and Harris was forged by their mutual sea-sickness. Matches were played in Montreal, Ottawa, Toronto, London, New York, Philadelphia, and Boston. The team sailed back from Quebec on 27 September and arrived at Liverpool on 8 October. Grace wrote that the tour was "a high point of (his) early years" and he "retained fond memories of it" for the rest of his life, calling it "a prolonged and happy picnic" in his ghost-written Reminiscences.

=== Towards a county championship ===
1873 was the year that some semblance of organisation was brought into county cricket with the introduction of a residence qualification. This was aimed principally at England's outstanding bowler James Southerton who had been playing for both Surrey and Sussex, having been born in one county and living in the other. Southerton chose to play for his county of residence, Surrey, from then on but remained the country's top bowler. The counties agreed on residence but not on a means of deciding a County Championship and so the title, known as "Champion County", remained an unofficial award by newspapers until 1890. Grace's Gloucestershire had a very strong claim to this unofficial title in 1873 but consensus was that they shared it with Nottinghamshire. These two did not play each other and both were unbeaten in six matches, though Nottinghamshire won five and Gloucestershire won four.

Nottinghamshire and Gloucestershire were due to meet at the end of July, only for a row to erupt after Nottinghamshire requested a change of date. The Gloucestershire committee agreed to the new date, but Grace objected because he had promised to play in a benefit match at Sheffield for Yorkshire's Joseph Rowbotham. The clubs insisted on the change, so the Graces closed ranks and refused to play, and the match was cancelled. That caused uproar among the Gloucestershire committee, where EM as club secretary found himself defending the family against multiple complaints of "high-handedness". It changed nothing except that the entire committee boycotted the next meeting, so EM recorded himself as sole attendee in the minutes.

Grace had another outstanding season on the field in 1873, when he became the first player ever to complete the "double" of 1,000 runs and 100 wickets in a season. He went on to do the double eight times in all from 1873 to 1886.

=== English cricket dishonoured ===
On 9 October 1873, Grace was married to Agnes Nicholls Day (1853–1930), who was the daughter of his first cousin William Day. Two weeks later, they began their honeymoon by taking ship to Australia for Grace's 1873–74 tour. They returned from the tour in May 1874 with Agnes six months pregnant. Their eldest son William Gilbert junior (1874–1905) was born on 6 July. Grace had to catch up with his studies at Bristol Medical School, and he and his wife and son lived at Downend until February 1875 with his mother, brother Fred and sister Fanny.

The English team in Australia was called W. G. Grace's XI. On the morning of their departure from Southampton, Grace responded to well-wishers by saying that his team "had a duty to perform to maintain the honour of English cricket, and to uphold the high character of English cricketers". But both his and the team's performances fell well short of this goal. The tour was not a success and the only positive outcome was the fact of it having taken place, ten years after the previous one, as it "gave Australian cricket a much needed fillip". Most of the problems lay with Grace himself and his "overbearing personality", which quickly exhausted all personal goodwill towards him. There was also bad feeling within the team itself because Grace, who normally got on well with professional players, enforced the class divide throughout the tour.

=== Gloucestershire the Champion County ===
Having toured Australia in the winter of 1873–74, Grace arrived in England on 18 May 1874 and was quickly back into domestic cricket. The 1874 season was very successful for him as he completed a second successive double. Gloucestershire again had a strong claim to the Champion County title although some sources have awarded it to Derbyshire, and Grace himself said that it should have gone to Yorkshire.

Another good season followed in 1875 when he again completed the double with 1,498 runs and 191 wickets, his most successful season as a bowler. The family moved to London in February 1875—after Grace was assigned to St Bartholomew's Hospital—and lived at Earl's Court, about five miles from the City. Their second son, Henry Edgar, was born there in July 1876.

One of the most outstanding phases of Grace's career occurred in the 1876 season, beginning with his career highest score of 344 for MCC against Kent at the St Lawrence Ground, Canterbury, in August. Two days after his innings at Canterbury, he made 177 for Gloucestershire against Nottinghamshire, and two days after that 318* for Gloucestershire v Yorkshire, these two innings against counties with exceptionally strong bowling attacks. Thus, in three consecutive innings, Grace scored 839 runs and was only out twice. His innings of 344 was the first triple century scored in first-class cricket and broke the record for the highest individual score in all classes of cricket, previously held by William Ward, who had scored 278 in 1820. Ward's record had stood for 56 years and, within a week, Grace bettered it twice. His 318* against Yorkshire was the record score in county cricket.

Gloucestershire were recognised as champions for the third and final time in 1877, largely thanks to another outstanding season by Grace who scored 1,474 runs and took 179 wickets. In the autumn of that year, the family moved back to Gloucestershire, where they lived with Grace's elder brother Henry, who was a general practitioner. Grace's studies had reached a crucial point with a theoretical backlog to catch up followed by his final practical session. Agnes became pregnant again at this time and their third child Bessie was born in May 1878.

=== Like a wolf on the fold ===
There was speculation that Grace intended to retire before the 1878 season to concentrate on his medical career, but he decided to continue playing cricket and may have been influenced by the arrival of the first Australian team to tour England in May. At Lord's on 27 May, the Australians defeated a strong MCC team, including Grace, by nine wickets in a single day's play. According to Chris Harte, news of the match "spread like wildfire and created a sensation in London and throughout England". The satirical magazine Punch responded to it by publishing a parody of Byron's poem The Destruction of Sennacherib, including a wry commentary on Grace's contribution:

The Australians came down like a wolf on the fold,
The Mary'bone Cracks for a trifle were bowled;
Our Grace before dinner was very soon done,
And Grace after dinner did not get a run.

There was bad feeling between Grace and some of the 1878 Australians, especially their manager John Conway; this came to a head on 20 June in a row over the services of Grace's friend Billy Midwinter, an Australian who had played for Gloucestershire in 1877. Midwinter was already in England before the main Australian party arrived and had joined them for their first match in May. On 20 June, Midwinter was at Lord's where he was due to play for the Australians against Middlesex. On the same day, the Gloucestershire team was at The Oval to play Surrey but arrived a man short. As a result, a group of Gloucestershire players led by WG and EM went to Lord's and persuaded Midwinter to accompany them back to The Oval and make up their numbers. Possibly, Midwinter was still under contractual obligation to Gloucestershire—the Australian press had reported this before the team embarked. They were pursued by three of the Australians who caught them at The Oval gates where a furious altercation ensued in front of bystanders. At one point, Grace called the Australians "a damned lot of sneaks" (he later apologised). In the end, Grace got his way and Midwinter stayed with Gloucestershire for the rest of the season. Afterwards, the row was patched up and Gloucestershire invited the Australians to play the county team at Clifton College—Midwinter, however, did not take part. The Australians took a measure of revenge and won easily by 10 wickets, with Fred Spofforth taking 12 wickets and making the top score. It was Gloucestershire's first-ever home defeat.

Gloucestershire made their first visit to Old Trafford Cricket Ground in July 1878 to play Lancashire, and this was the match immortalised by Francis Thompson in his idyllic poem At Lord's.

Despite his troubles in 1878, it was another good season for Grace on the field as he completed a sixth successive double. But the events at The Oval had a postscript during the following winter when he and EM were called to account by the Gloucestershire membership because of the expenses they had claimed from Surrey for that match, and which Surrey had refused to authorise.

=== So-called gentlemen ===
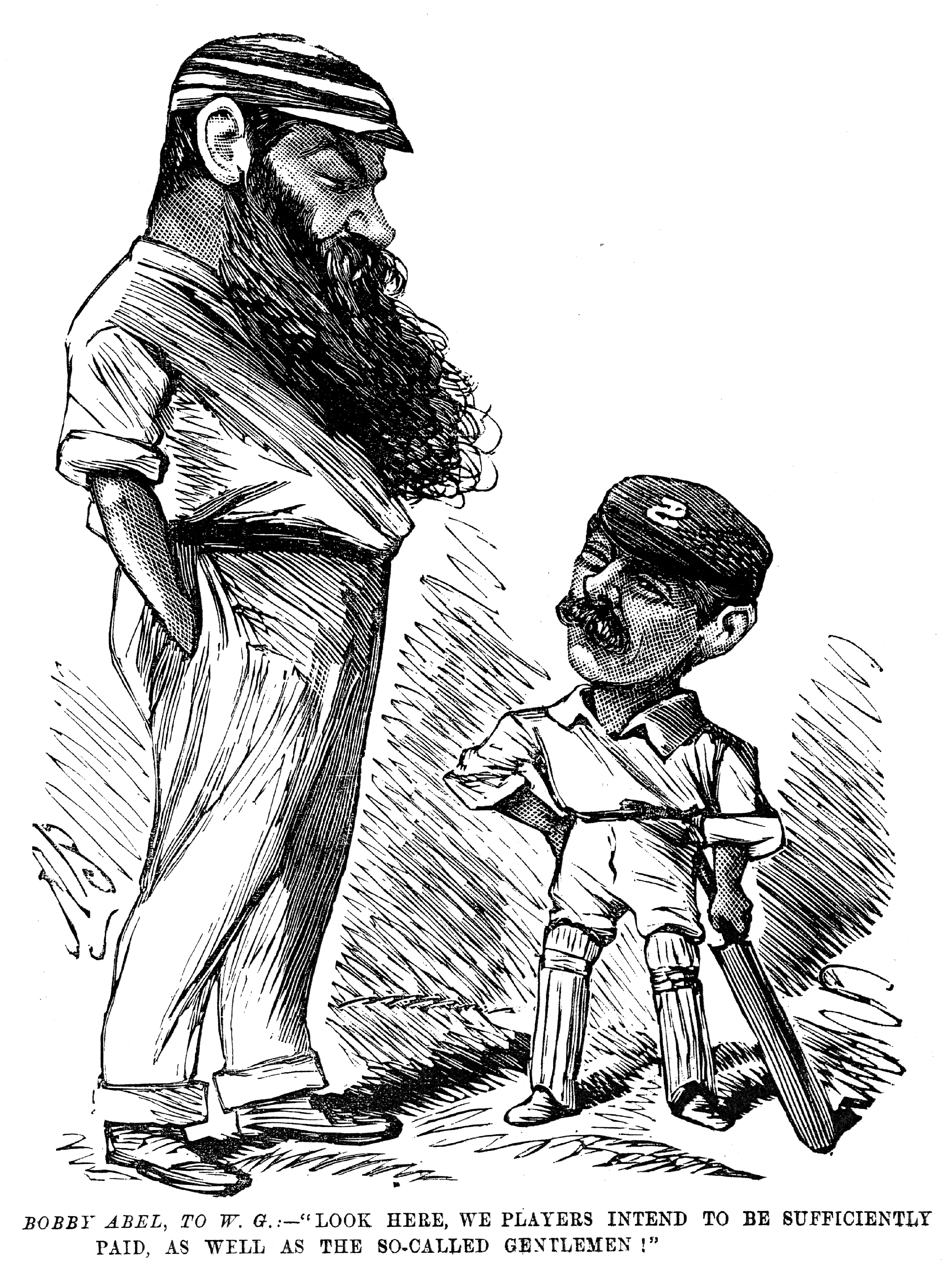
Entr'acte cartoon: Bobby Abel to W. G. Grace: "Look here, we players intend to be sufficiently paid, as well as the so-called gentlemen!"

At the enquiry in January 1879, WG and EM were forced to answer charges that they had claimed "exorbitant expenses", one of the few times that their money-making activity was seriously challenged. The Graces managed to survive "a protracted and stormy meeting" with EM retaining his key post as club secretary, although he was forced to liaise in future with a new finance committee and abide by stricter rules.

The incident highlighted an ongoing issue about the nominal amateur status of the Grace brothers. The amateur was, by definition, not paid, and the dictum of the amateur-dominated MCC was that "a gentleman ought not to make any profit from playing cricket". Like all amateur players, they claimed expenses for travel and accommodation to and from cricket matches, but there is plenty of evidence that the Graces made more money from playing than reimbursement of actual expenses, and WG in particular "made more than any professional". In his later years he had to pay for a locum tenens to run his medical practice while he was playing cricket; paradoxically, he had a reputation for treating his poorer patients without charging a fee. He was paid salaries for his management roles with both the USEE and the London County club. He was the recipient of two national testimonials. The first was presented to him by Lord Fitzhardinge at Lord's on 22 July 1879 in the form of a marble clock, two bronze ornaments and a cheque for £1,458 (equivalent to £156,600 in 2025). The second, collected by MCC, the county of Gloucestershire, The Daily Telegraph and The Sportsman, amounted to £9,703 (equivalent to £1,116,100 in 2025) and was presented to him in 1896 in appreciation of his "Indian Summer" season of 1895.

Whatever criticisms may be made of Grace for making money for himself out of cricket, he was "punctilious in his aid when (professional players) were the beneficiaries". For example, he altered the date of a Gloucestershire match so that he could travel to Sheffield and take part in a Yorkshire player's benefit match, knowing full well the impact that his appearance would have on the gate. John Arlott recorded, "it was no uncommon sight to see outside a cricket ground":

CRICKET MATCH
Admission 6d
If W. G. Grace plays
Admission 1/–

On another occasion, when Alfred Shaw's benefit match in 1879 was ruined by rain, Grace insisted on donating to Shaw the proceeds of another match that had been arranged to support Grace's own testimonial fund. 1879 was a wet summer and, after the same thing happened to Ned Willsher's benefit match, Grace took a select team to play Kent a few days later, the proceeds all going to Willsher.

=== "The Doctor" ===
Following the 1878 season, Grace was assigned to Westminster Hospital Medical School for the final practical of his medical qualification, so the family moved back to London and lived at Acton. The upheaval was worthwhile because, in November 1879, Grace finally received his diploma from the University of Edinburgh, having qualified as a Licentiate of the Royal College of Physicians (LRCP) and became a Member of the Royal College of Surgeons (MRCS).

After qualifying, he worked in his own practice at Thrissle Lodge, 61 Stapleton Road in Easton, a largely poor district of Bristol, employing two locums during the cricket season. He was the local Public Vaccinator and had additional duties as the Medical Officer to the Barton Regis Union, which involved tending patients in the workhouse. There are many testimonies from his patients that he was a good doctor, for example: "Poor families knew that they did not need to worry about calling him in, as the bills would never arrive". The family lived at four different addresses close to the practice over the next twenty years, during which their fourth and last child Charles Butler was born.

With his commitments at Westminster Hospital, Grace missed a large part of the 1879 season and, for the first time since 1869, did not complete 1,000 runs, though he did take 105 wickets. Having qualified, his new practice took priority for the next five years, with the result that his cricket sometimes had to be set aside. For example, he made only thirteen first-class appearances in 1881. He had other troubles, including a serious bout of mumps in 1882. He never topped the seasonal batting averages in the 1880s, and he did not complete 1,000 runs in any of the 1879 to 1882 seasons.

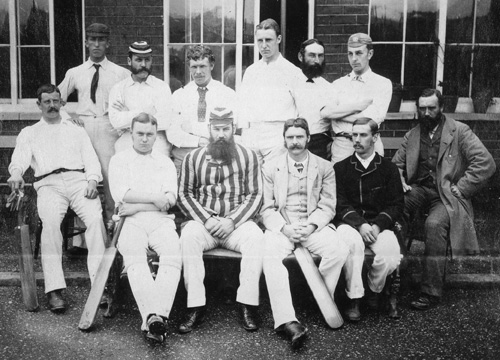
Gloucestershire County Cricket Club in 1880 shortly before Fred Grace's untimely death. WG is seated front left centre. Fred (hooped cap) is third left in rear group. Billy Midwinter is fourth left in rear (directly behind WG). E. M. Grace (bearded) is sixth left in rear.

Although the early matches were recognised retrospectively, Test cricket began in 1877 when Grace was already 28. He played for England in 22 Tests through the 1880s and 1890s, all of them against Australia. He was an automatic selection at home, but his only Test-playing tour was to Australia in 1891–92. Grace made his debut in 1880, scoring England's first-ever Test century with an innings of 154 at The Oval in what is retrospectively recognised as the inaugural Test match in England. His brothers, E. M. and Fred, were also playing in that match, but Fred died soon afterwards from pneumonia.

Grace was badly upset by the early death of Fred, to whom he had been especially close despite their different characters. Fred's demise has been seen as a major factor in the subsequent decline of the Gloucestershire team, there being a view that "the county was never quite the same without him". Apart from W. G. himself, the only players of Fred's calibre at the time were the leading professionals. Unlike the northern and south-eastern counties, Gloucestershire had neither the large home gates nor the necessary funds that could have secured the services of good-quality professionals, a new generation of whom was emerging in the likes of Billy Gunn, Maurice Read, and Arthur Shrewsbury. As a result, Gloucestershire fell away in county competition and were no longer a match for Lancashire, Nottinghamshire, Surrey, or Yorkshire.

Grace was one of England's players who lost the "Ashes Match" at The Oval on 28 and 29 August 1882. Thanks to Spofforth, who took 14 wickets in the match, Australia won by 7 runs and the legend of The Ashes was born immediately afterwards. Grace, who scored 4 and 32, has been held responsible for "firing up" Spofforth. This came about through a typical piece of gamesmanship when Grace effected an unsporting, albeit legal, run out of Sammy Jones.

=== Injury problems ===
Grace's medical career took priority his cricket career in 1883, and caused him to miss a Gentlemen v Players match for the first time since 1867. Recurring injury problems restricted his appearances in 1884, and it was in July of that year when Lancashire captain A. N. Hornby stopped play in a match at Old Trafford so that EM and WG could return home on receipt of a cable reporting the death of Mrs Martha Grace at the age of 72.

Grace achieved his career-best bowling analysis of 10/49 when playing for MCC against Oxford University at The Parks in 1886; and he scored 104 in his only innings to complete a rare "match double". This was the last season in which he took 100 wickets.

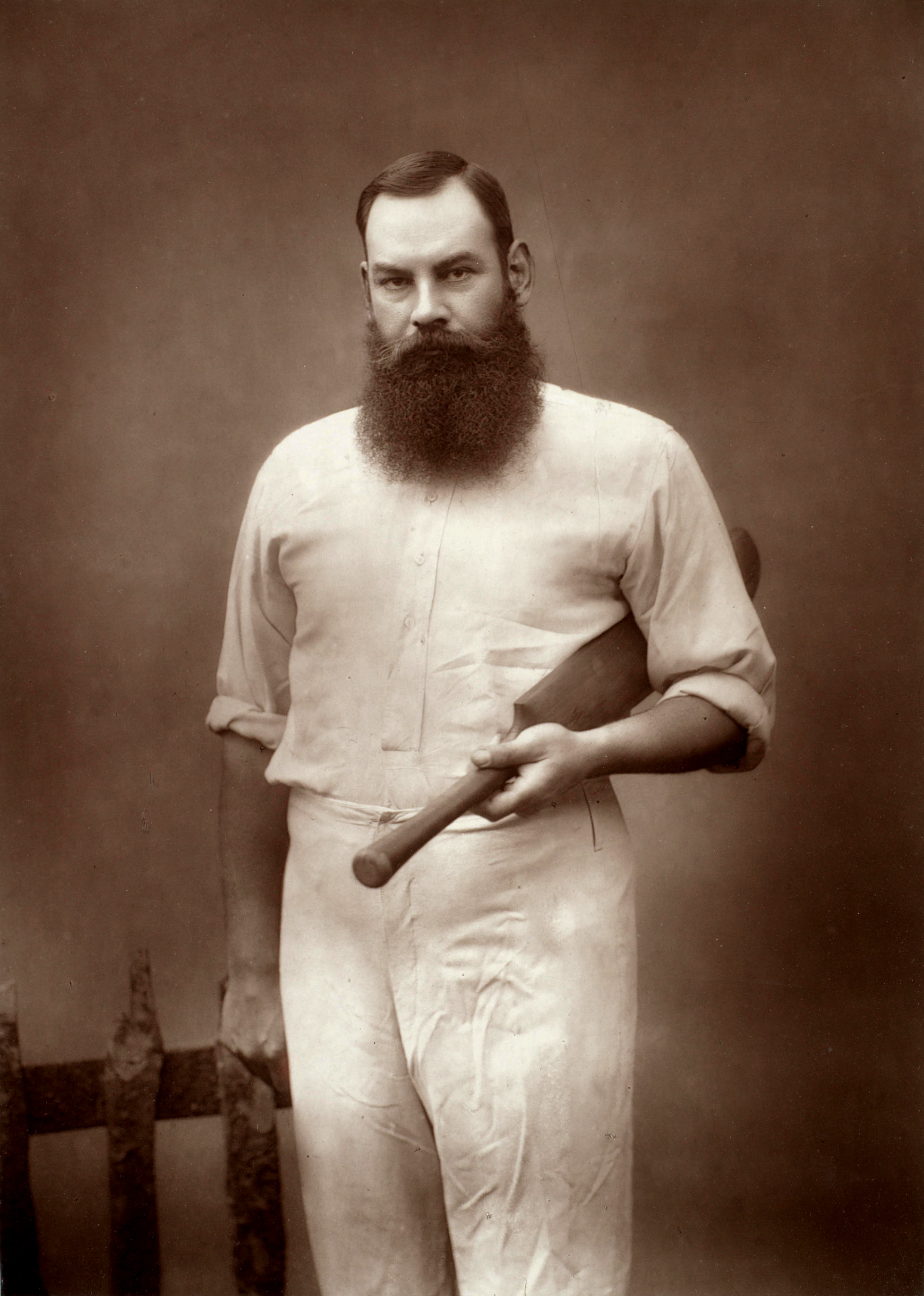
Portrait of Grace by Herbert Rose Barraud, c. late 1880s

Playing for Gloucestershire against Yorkshire at Clifton in August 1888, Grace scored two centuries (148 and 153) in the match and, although it ended in a draw, he labelled it "my champion match". He had reduced his bowling somewhat after 1886, and he became an occasional bowler only from 1889. More injury problems, particularly a bad knee, took their toll in the early 1890s and Grace had his worst season in 1891 when he scored no centuries and could only average 19.76.

=== "A bad loser" ===
Despite all these issues, patron Lord Sheffield had no doubts about Grace leading his England team on its 1891–92 tour of Australia. Grace negotiated a considerable fee of £3,000 for himself, which included travel and accommodation for his wife and their youngest children. This overhead became a financial burden that terminated any chance of the tour returning a profit. In addition, several leading players declined to take part, largely because the offer to each of them was £300—a mere 10% of Grace's fee—"exclusive of alcohol and tobacco". The final team was something of a mixed bag and included at least three players who were not Test match standard.

Grace's attitude and behaviour on the tour caused bad feeling. He was initially welcomed by the Australian press and public, but he ruined their goodwill by making controversial remarks and failing to control his temper. Australia, led by Jack Blackham, won the first Test at the Melbourne Cricket Ground by 54 runs. Grace was enraged by the Australian batting tactics, as Alec Bannerman in particular had resorted to "stonewalling" when conditions favoured the bowlers. This worked for Australia, as they were able to extend play into a fifth day and were then able to bowl England out.

In the second Test at the Sydney Cricket Ground, Grace infuriated the Australians by refusing to allow a substitute fielder for the injured Harry Moses, who also had to bat without a runner. In addition, Grace angered his own team by some dubious captaincy decisions which eventually cost England both the match and the series. Having been 163 runs behind on first innings, Australia won the match by 72 runs. George Lohmann, who had bowled England into a strong position by taking 8/58 in Australia's first innings, shouted that he would never play under Grace again.

Besides the incidents in the Test matches, Grace disputed a decision by umpire E. J. Briscoe when the tourists played New South Wales. This led to an enquiry which could not be resolved because Grace denied calling Briscoe a cheat. Before the final Test, Grace objected to the appointment of umpire Tom Flynn, who was widely respected in Australian cricket. Grace was acting out of pique and the result was that two inexperienced umpires stood in the match.

Having won the first two Tests, Australia had taken the series and regained the Ashes. England had a consolation victory in the final Test, thanks to the bowling of Johnny Briggs, who took 6/49 and 6/87. Grace was delighted with that result, but the tour had been disastrous, and he would not accept any blame for it. Former Australian Test captain Tom Horan, writing as "Felix", summarised the tour by saying:

Grace is a bad loser, and when he lost his temper too (after losing the first two Tests), he kept on losing it right to the finish.

Simon Rae pointed out that Grace at 43 had behaved just as badly as Grace at 25 on his first tour of Australia. He had not learned from his mistakes and "simply repeated them", blithely assuming that he had nothing to apologise for.

=== An Indian Summer ===
Having eventually recovered from his injuries, Grace rallied somewhat to score 1,000 runs each season from 1892 to 1894. Even so, it was against all expectation that he produced in 1895 a season that has been called his "Indian Summer". He completed what was then calculated to be his hundredth century, playing for Gloucestershire against Somerset in May. Charles Townsend, his batting partner when he reached the milestone, said that as he approached his hundred: "This was the one and only time I ever saw him flustered". Eventually, Sammy Woods bowled a full toss which Grace drove for four to reach his century.

He then went on to score 1,000 runs in the month, the first time this had ever been done, with scores of 13, 103, 18, 25, 288, 52, 257, 73*, 18 and 169 totalling 1,016 runs between 9 and 30 May. His aggregate for the whole season was 2,346 at an average of 51.00 with nine centuries. Grace was aged forty-six at the start of the season. He was the sole recipient of the Wisden Cricketers of the Year award for 1896, the first of only three times that Wisden has restricted the award to a single player—there are normally five recipients.

Patrick Morrah began his study of cricket's perceived "Golden Age" with Grace's "Indian Summer" in 1895. Morrah praised Grace's exploits as the "central episode" of what was, in any case, an important season—it began with the elevation of first-class cricket from a popular concept to an official standard.

=== "A bit too far away" ===
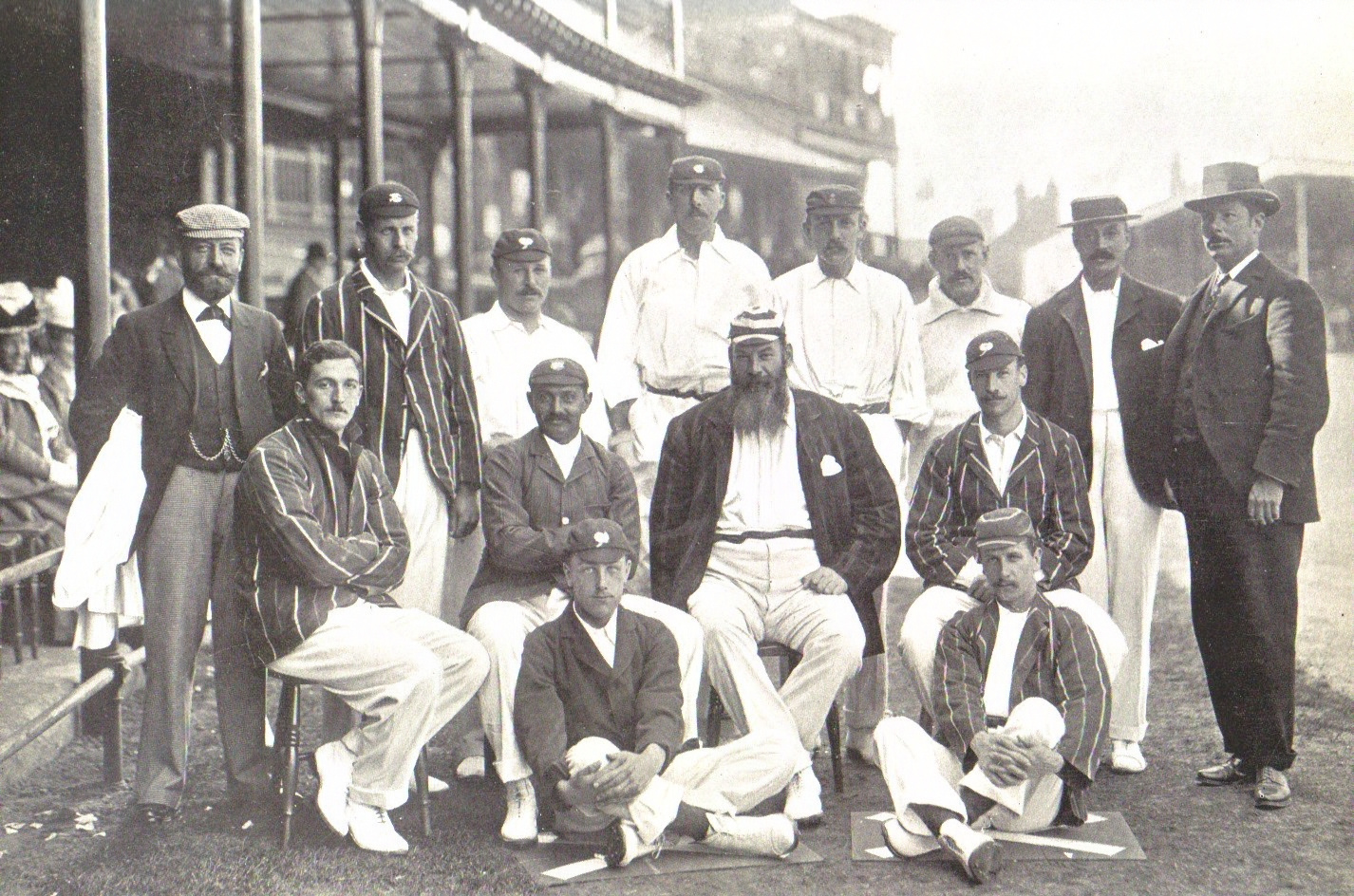
England's team in Grace's final Test at Trent Bridge in 1899. Back row: Dick Barlow (umpire), Tom Hayward, George Hirst, Billy Gunn, J. T. Hearne (12th man), Bill Storer (wkt kpr), Bill Brockwell, V. A. Titchmarsh (umpire). Middle row: C. B. Fry, K. S. Ranjitsinhji, W. G. Grace (captain), Stanley Jackson. Front row: Wilfred Rhodes, Johnny Tyldesley.

By the time of his fiftieth birthday in July 1898, Grace had developed a somewhat corpulent figure and had lost his former agility, which meant he was no longer a competent fielder. He remained a very good batsman and at need a useful slow bowler, but he was clearly entering the twilight of his career and was now generally referred to as "The Old Man". As a special occasion, the MCC committee arranged the 1898 Gentlemen v Players match to coincide with his fiftieth birthday and he celebrated the event by scoring 43 and 31*, though handicapped by lameness and an injured hand.

During the 1899 season, Grace received an invitation from the Crystal Palace Company in London to help them form London County Cricket Club. He accepted to became the club's secretary, manager, and captain with an annual salary of £600.

Grace captained England in the first Test of the 1899 series against Australia at Trent Bridge, when he was 51. By this time his bulk had made him a liability in the field and, afterwards, realising his limitations all too clearly, he decided to stand down and surrendered both his place and the captaincy to Archie MacLaren. It is evident that Grace "plotted" his own omission from the team by asking C. B. Fry, another selector who had arrived late for their meeting, if he thought that MacLaren should play in the Second Test. Fry answered: "Yes, I do". "That settles it", said Grace, and he promptly retired from international cricket. Explaining his decision later, Grace ruefully admitted of his diminished fielding skills that "the ground was getting a bit too far away".

=== "The Old Man" ===
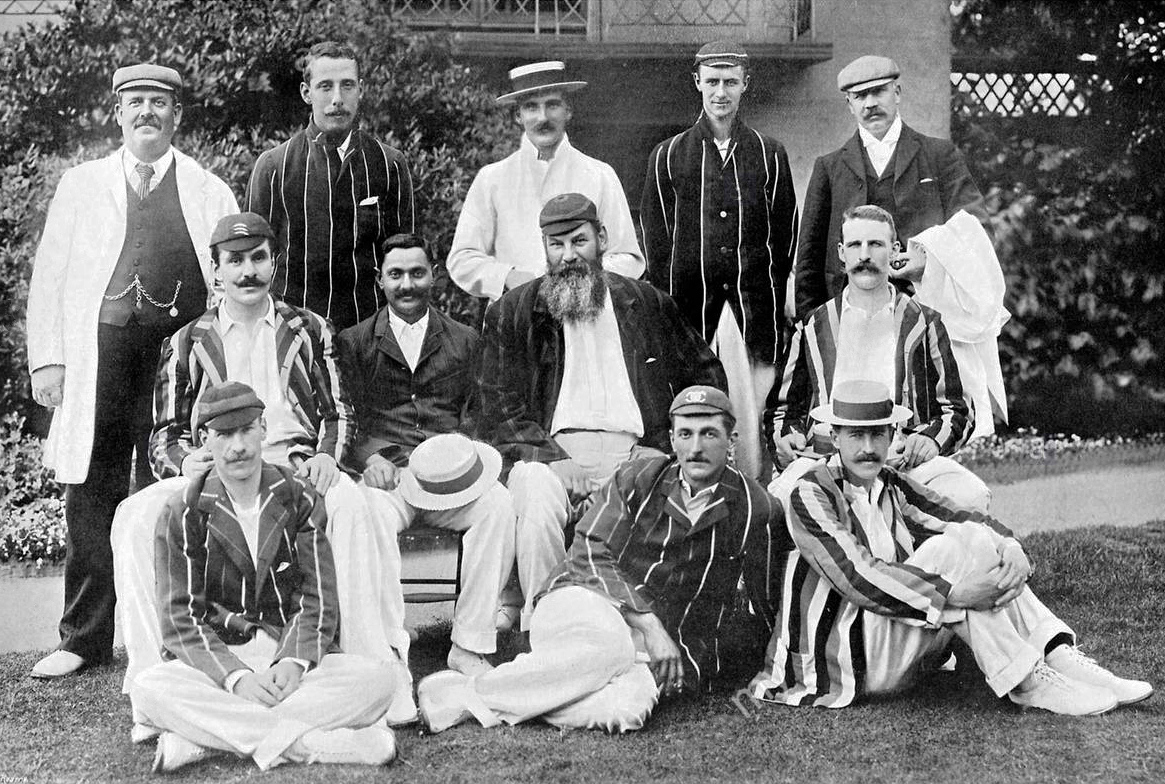
Gentlemen, captained by W. G. Grace, versus Players, Lords 1899

After leaving Gloucestershire, the Graces lived in Mottingham, a south-east London suburb, not far from Crystal Palace Park where he played for London County, or from Eltham, where he played club cricket in his sixties. A blue plaque marks their residence, Fairmount, in Mottingham Lane. Grace and his wife suffered two tragic losses in this period. First, the loss of their daughter Bessie in 1899, aged only 20, from typhoid. She had been Grace's favourite child. Then, in February 1905, their eldest son. W. G. junior died of appendicitis at the age of 30.

London County played first-class matches from 1900 to 1904. Grace's presence initially attracted other leading players into the team, including C. B. Fry, K. S. Ranjitsinhji, and Johnny Douglas, but the increased importance of the County Championship, combined with Grace's inevitable decline in form and the lack of a competitive element in London's matches, led to reduced attendances and consequently the club lost money. Nevertheless, Grace remained an attraction and could still produce good performances. As late as 1902, though aged 54 by the end of the season, he scored 1,187 runs in first-class cricket, with two centuries, at an average of 37.09. London's final first-class matches were played in 1904 and the enterprise folded in 1908.

With the demise of London County as a first-class team, the number of Grace's appearances dwindled over the next four seasons until he called it a day in 1908. His final appearance for the Gentlemen versus the Players was in July 1906 at The Oval, the match coinciding with his 58th birthday. When he began his second innings, the Gentlemen were expecting defeat but Grace saved the match, which ended in a draw, by scoring a dogged 74 runs. He was given a standing ovation as he left the field. That was his last "big match", but he continued to make occasional first-class appearances until 20–22 April 1908 when he captained the Gentlemen of England against Surrey at The Oval, where, opening the innings, he scored 15 and 25.

== Later years ==
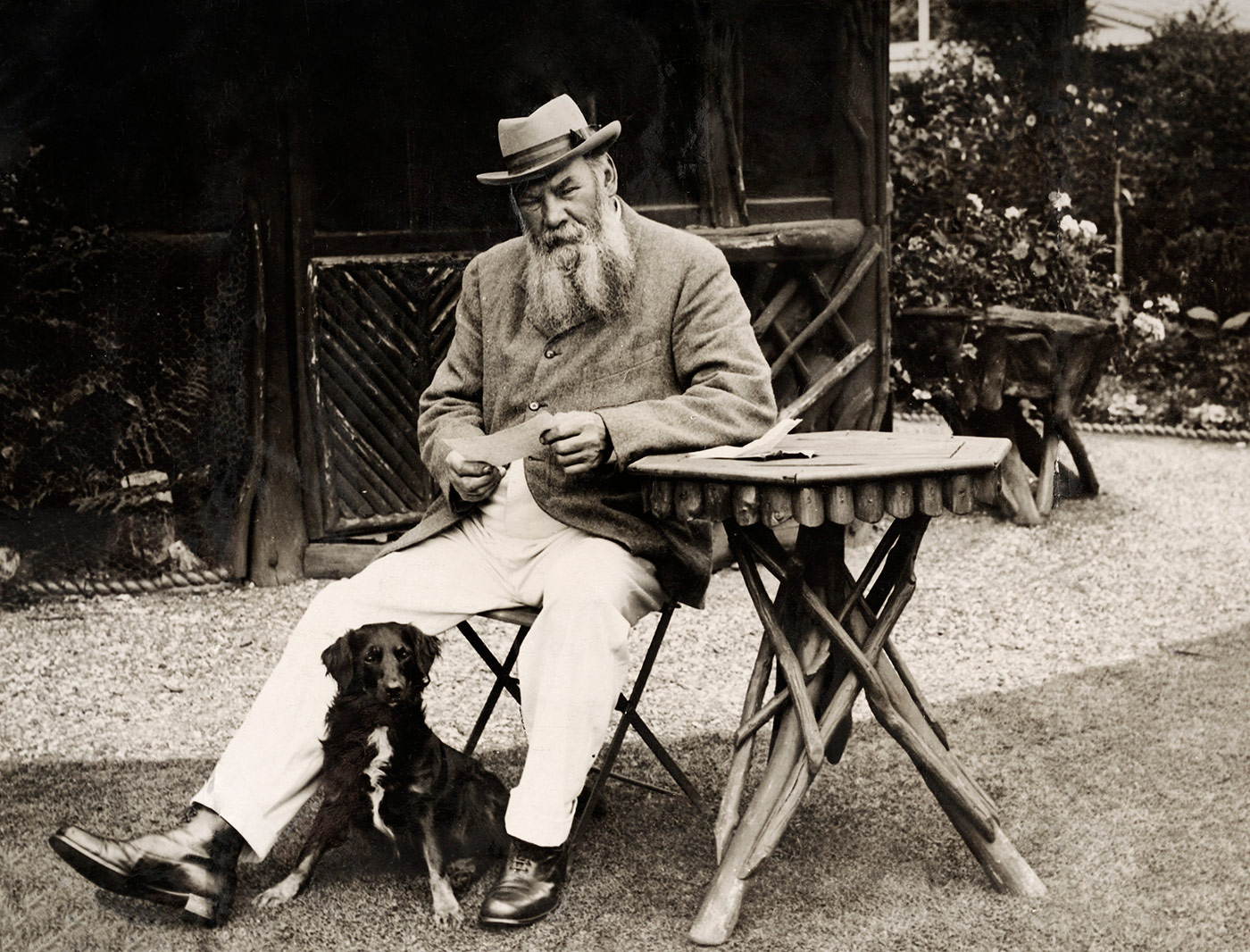
Grace on his 66th birthday, 1914

Following the move to Mottingham, Grace became very interested in lawn bowls. He helped found an international competition with Scotland, Ireland and Wales, captaining England from the inaugural international at Crystal Palace in 1903 until 1908. He supported the pioneering all-female Womanhood Bowling Club at Crystal Palace by obtaining the use of a club pavilion for them in 1902. He was also keen on curling. His interest in golf brought him into intimate contact with one of his biographers Bernard Darwin, who said that Grace played golf "with a mixture of keen seriousness and cheerful noisiness". He could drive straight and sometimes putt well but, for reasons that Darwin could not understand, "he never could play an iron shot well".

Despite his age and bulk, Grace continued to play minor cricket for several years after his retirement from the first-class version. His penultimate match, and the last in which he batted, was for Eltham Cricket Club at Grove Park on 25 July 1914, a week after his 66th birthday. He contributed an undefeated 69 to a total of 155–6 declared, having begun his innings when they were 31/4. Grove Park made 99/8 in reply. The last match of any kind that Grace played in, though he neither batted nor bowled, was for Eltham v Northbrook on 8 August, a few days after the outbreak of the First World War.

On 26 August 1914, in response to news of casualties at the Battle of Mons, Grace wrote a letter to The Sportsman in which he called for the immediate closure of the county cricket season and for all first-class cricketers to set an example and serve their country. It was published the next day but did not, as is often supposed, bring an immediate end to the cricket season, as one further round of County Championship matches was played. Grace was reportedly distressed by the war and was known to shake his fist and shout at the German Zeppelins floating over his home in South London. When H. D. G. Leveson-Gower remonstrated that he had not allowed fast bowlers to unsettle him, Grace retorted: "I could see those beggars; I can't see these".

Grace died at Mottingham on 23 October 1915, aged 67, after suffering a heart attack. His death was said to have "shook the nation almost as much as Winston Churchill's fifty years later". He is buried in the family grave at Beckenham Cemetery, Kent.

== Style and technique ==
=== Approach to cricket ===
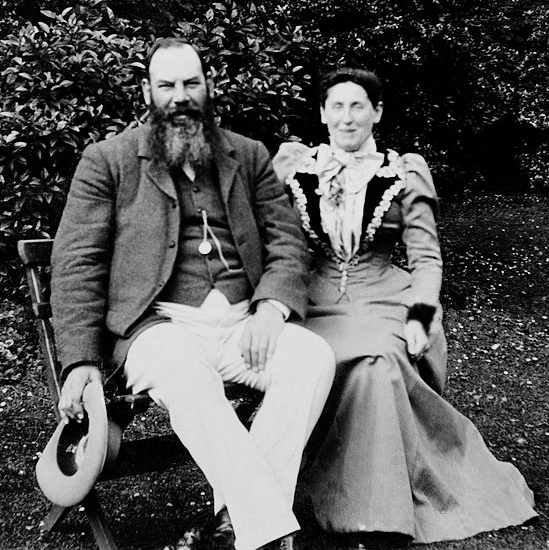
Grace with his wife Agnes, c. 1900

Grace himself had much to say about how to play cricket in his two books Cricket (1891) and Reminiscences (1899), both of which were ghost-written. His fundamental opinion was that cricketers are "not born" but must be nurtured to develop their skills through coaching and practice; in his own case, he had achieved his skill through constant practice as a boy at home under the tutelage of his uncle Alfred Pocock.

Although the work ethic was of prime importance in his development, Grace insisted that cricket must also be enjoyable and freely admitted that his family all played in a way that was "noisy and boisterous" with much "chaff" (a Victorian term for teasing). WG and EM in particular were noted throughout their careers for being noisy and boisterous on the field—Fred was much quieter, and a less demonstrative character. They were extremely competitive and always playing to win. Sometimes this went to extremes—for example, on one occasion at school, EM was so upset about a decision going against him that he went home and took the stumps with him—and it developed into the gamesmanship for which EM and WG were always controversial.

Because of gamesmanship and insistence on his rights, as he saw them, Grace never enjoyed good relations with Australians in general, though he had personal friends like Billy Midwinter and Billy Murdoch. In 1874, an Australian newspaper wrote: "We in Australia did not take kindly to WG. For so big a man, he is surprisingly tenacious on very small points. We thought him too apt to wrangle in the spirit of a duo-decimo lawyer over small points of the game".

He was just the same in England, and even his old friend Lord Harris agreed that "his gamesmanship added to the fund of stories about him". One such story concerned Grace batting against Surrey in a match at Clifton. The ball lodged in his shirt after he had played it, and he seized the opportunity to complete several runs before the fielders forced him to stop. He disingenuously claimed that he would have been out handled the ball if he had removed it and, following a discussion, it was agreed that three runs should be awarded.

The point was that Grace "approached cricket as if he were fighting a small war" and he was "out to win at all costs". The Australians recognised this. Joe Darling, when touring England for the first time in 1896, said: "We were all told not to trust the Old Man as he was out to win every time and was a great bluffer".

=== Batting ===
With regard to Grace's batsmanship, C. L. R. James held that the best analysis of his style and technique was written by another top-class batsman, K. S. Ranjitsinhji, in his Jubilee Book of Cricket (1897; co-written with C. B. Fry).

Ranjitsinhji wrote that Grace "revolutionised batting (by converting) it from an accomplishment into a science". Before him, batsmen would play either forward or back and make a speciality of a certain stroke. Grace "made utility the criterion of style" and incorporated both forward and back play into his repertoire of strokes, favouring only that which was appropriate to the ball being delivered at the moment. In an oft-quoted phrase, Ranjitsinhji said of Grace: "he turned the old one-stringed instrument [the cricket bat] into a many-chorded lyre".

Ranjitsinhji summarised Grace's importance to the development of cricket by writing: "I hold him to be not only the finest player born or unborn, but the maker of modern batting (of which) the theory is in all essentials the result of WG's thinking and working on the game". Cricket writer and broadcaster John Arlott, writing in 1975, supported this view by holding that Grace "created modern cricket".

But Grace's extraordinary skill had already been recognised very early in his career, especially by the professional bowlers, as when Tom Emmett called him a "nonsuch" in 1869. Altham pointed out that for most of Grace's career, he played on pitches that "the modern schoolboy would consider unfit for a house match" and on grounds without boundaries where every hit including those "into the country" had to be run in full. Rowland Bowen recorded that 1895, the year of Grace's "Indian Summer", was the season in which marl was first used as a binding agent in the composition of English pitches, its benefit being to ensure "good lasting wickets".

It was through Alfred Pocock's perseverance that Grace had learned to play straight and to develop a sound defence so that he would stop or leave the good deliveries and score off the poor ones. This contrasted him with EM who was "always a hitter" and whose basic defence was not as sound. However, as Grace's skills developed, he became a very powerful hitter himself with a full range of shots and, at his best, would score runs freely. Despite being an all-rounder, he was also an opening batsman.

=== Bowling ===
As a bowler, Grace belonged to what Altham calls the "high, home and easy school of a much earlier day". Using a roundarm action, Grace was adept at varying both his pace and the arc of his slower deliveries, which worked in from the leg side of the pitch. The chief feature of his bowling was the excellent length which he consistently maintained. He originally bowled at a consistently fast medium pace but in the 1870s he increasingly adopted his slower style which utilised a leg break. He called this a "leg-tweeker" but he put very little break on the ball, just enough to bring it across from the batsman's legs to the wicket and he invariably posted a fielder in a strategic position on the square leg boundary, a trap which brought occasional success. He was unusual in persisting with a roundarm action throughout his career, while almost all other bowlers adopted the newly legalised overarm style.

=== Fielding ===
Grace in his prime was noted for his outstanding fielding and was a very strong thrower of the ball, as he demonstrated when he threw one for 122 yards during his athletics career. He attributed this skill to his country-bred childhood in which stone throwing at crows was a daily exercise. In later life, Grace commented upon a decline in English fielding standards and blamed it on "the falling numbers of country-bred boys who strengthen their arms by throwing stones at birds in the fields".

Grace's Wisden obituary said that much of his success as a bowler was the result of his magnificent fielding to his own bowling; as soon as he had delivered the ball he covered so much ground to the left that he made himself into an extra mid-off and he took some extraordinary catches in this way. In his early career, Grace generally fielded at long-leg or cover-point; later he was usually at point (see Fielding positions in cricket). In his prime, he was a fine thrower, a fast runner and a safe catcher.

== Legacy and tributes ==
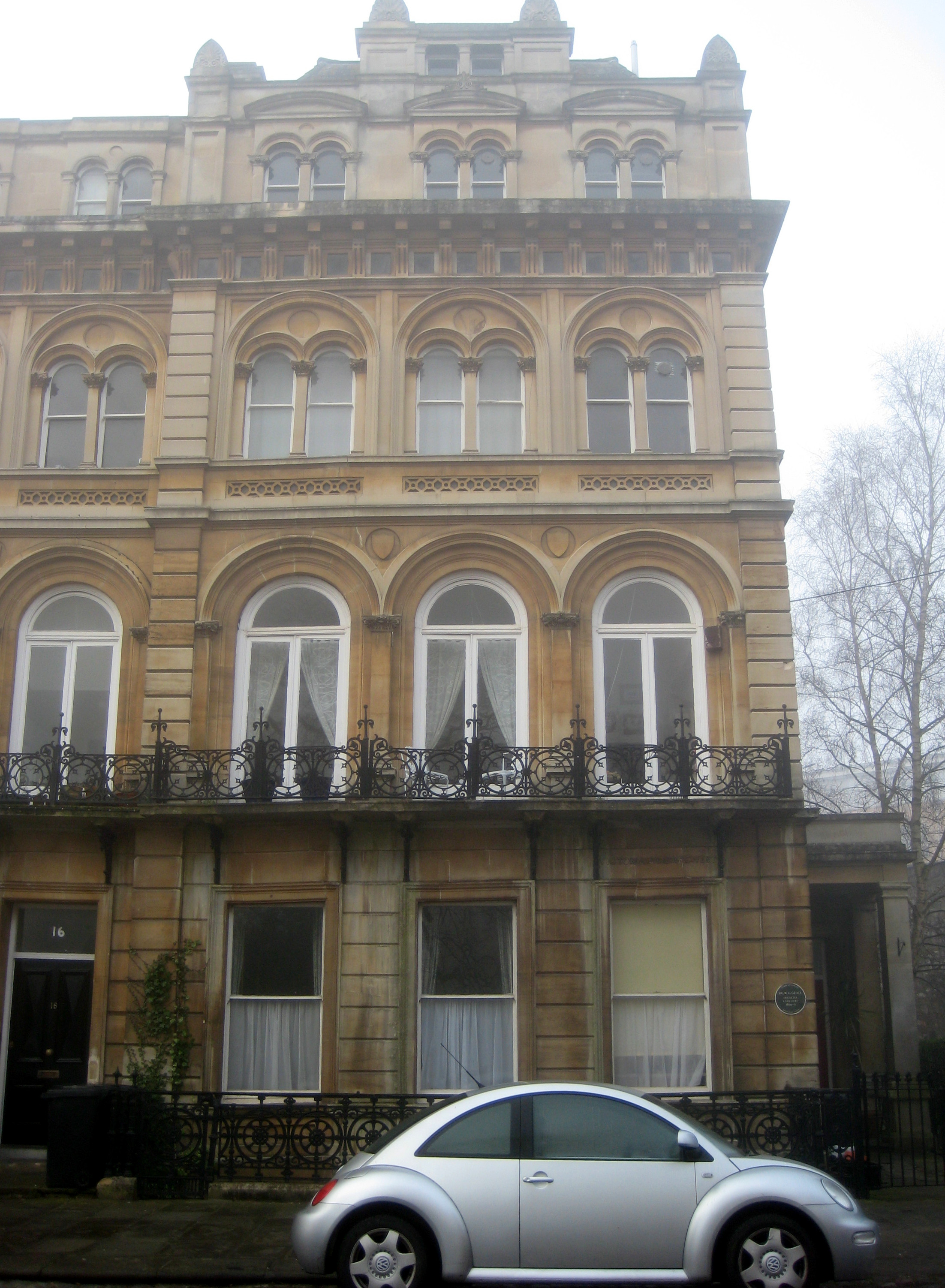
15 Victoria Square, Clifton, Grace's home from 1894 to 1896

MCC decided to commemorate Grace's life and career with a Memorial Biography, published in 1919. Its preface begins with this passage:

Never was such a band of cricketers gathered for any tour as has assembled to do honour to the greatest of all players in the present Memorial Biography. That such a volume should go forth under the auspices of the Committee of MCC is in itself unique in the history of the game, and that such an array of cricketers, critics and enthusiasts should pay tribute to its finest exponent has no parallel in any other branch of sport. In itself this presents a noble monument of what W. G. Grace was, a testimony to his prowess and to his personality.

The W. G. Grace Memorial Gates were erected at the St John's Wood Road entrance to Lord's. They were designed by Sir Herbert Baker and the opening ceremony in 1923 was performed by Sir Stanley Jackson, who had suggested the inclusion of the words The Great Cricketer in the dedication. On 12 September 2009, Grace was posthumously inducted into the ICC Cricket Hall of Fame at Lord's—two of his direct descendants attended the ceremony.

British commemorative postage stamps issued on 16 May 1973 for the County Cricket Centenary featured three sketches of Grace by Harry Furniss. The values were threepence (then first-class post); seven pence halfpenny; and ninepence. Grace's fame has endured and his large beard in particular remains familiar. For example, Monty Python and the Holy Grail (1975) used his image as the "face of God".

Many of the tributes paid to Grace referred to him as "The Great Cricketer". Harry Altham, for one, described him as "the greatest of all cricketers". John Arlott summarised him as "timeless" and "the greatest (cricketer) of them all". The anti-Stalinist Trinidadian writer C. L. R. James, in his Beyond a Boundary, included a section "W. G.: Pre-Eminent Victorian", containing four chapters and covering some sixty pages. He declared Grace "the best-known Englishman of his time" and aligned him with Thomas Arnold and Thomas Hughes as "the three most eminent Victorians". James wrote of cricket as "the game he (Grace) transformed into a national institution". Simon Rae also commented upon Grace's eminence in Victorian England by saying that his public recognition was equalled by only Queen Victoria herself and William Ewart Gladstone.

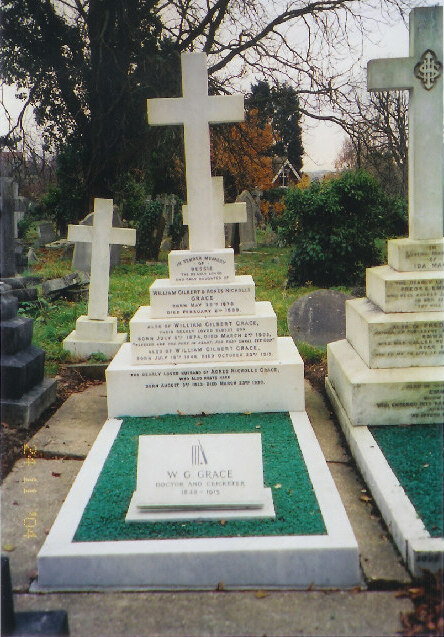
Grace's grave in Beckenham Cemetery

The inaugural edition of Playfair Cricket Annual in 1948 coincided with the centenary of Grace's birth and carried a tribute which spoke of Grace as "King in his own domain" and his "Olympian personality". Playfair went on to say how Grace had "pulverised fast bowling on chancy pitches" and had then "astonished the world" by his deeds during his 1895 "Indian Summer". In the foreword of the same edition, C. B. Fry insisted that Grace would not have started the 1948 season with any notion of being beaten by that season's Australian touring team, for he was "sanguine" and would have put everything he could muster into the task of beating them with no acceptance of defeat "till after it happened". As mentioned in Playfair, both MCC and Gloucestershire arranged special matches on Grace's birthday to commemorate his centenary.

For the 1963 edition of Wisden Cricketers' Almanack, Grace was selected by Neville Cardus as one of the Six Giants of the Wisden Century. This was a special commemorative selection requested by Wisden for its 100th edition. The other five players chosen were Sydney Barnes, Don Bradman, Jack Hobbs, Tom Richardson and Victor Trumper. To mark 150 years of the Almanack, Wisden named him in an all-time Test World XI.

Derek Birley, who devoted whole passages of his book to criticism of Grace's gamesmanship and moneymaking, wrote that the "bleakness (of the war) was exemplified in November (sic) 1915 by the death of Grace, which seemed depressingly emblematic of the end of an era". Rowland Bowen wrote that "many of Grace's achievements would be rated extremely good by our standards" but "by the standards of his day they were phenomenal: nothing like them had ever been done before".

David Frith summed up Grace's legacy to cricket by writing that "his influence lasted long after his final appearance in first-class cricket in 1908 and his death in 1915". "For decades", wrote Frith, "Grace had been arguably the most famous man in England", easily recognisable because of "his beard and his bulk", and revered because of "his batsmanship". Frith added a view that even though Grace's records had been overtaken, "his pre-eminence" had not, and so Grace "remains the most famous cricketer of them all, the one who elevated the game in public esteem".

== Bibliography ==
- ACS (1982). A Guide to First-class Cricket Matches Played in the British Isles. Nottingham: ACS. OCLC 10586869.
- Altham, H. S.; Swanton, E. W. (1962). A History of Cricket, Volume 1 (to 1914) (5th ed.). London: George Allen & Unwin. OCLC 894274808.
- Arlott, John (1984). Arlott on Cricket. London: Harper Collins. ISBN 978-00-02180-82-5.
- Barclays (1986). Swanton, E. W.; Plumptre, George; Woodcock, John (eds.). Barclays World of Cricket. London: HarperCollins. ISBN 978-00-02181-93-8.
- Birley, Derek (1999). A Social History of English Cricket. London: Aurum Press. ISBN 978-18-54107-10-7 – via Internet Archive.
- Bowen, Rowland (1970). Cricket: A History of its Growth and Development. London: Eyre & Spottiswoode. ISBN 978-04-13278-60-9.
- Darwin, Bernard (1981) [1934]. W. G. Grace (Great Lives Series). London: Duckworth Books. ISBN 978-07-15615-40-9.
- Frith, David (1978). The Golden Age of Cricket. Cambridge: The Lutterworth Press. ISBN 978-07-18870-22-5.
- Gibson, Alan (1989). The Cricket Captains of England. London: Cassell. ISBN 978-0-3042-9779-5.
- Grace, W. G. (1891). Cricket. Bristol: J. W. Arrowsmith Ltd. OCLC 6588887. Ghost-written by W. Methven Brownlee.
- Grace, W. G. (1980) [1899]. Cricketing Reminiscences and Personal Recollections. London: Hambledon Press. ISBN 978-0-9506-8820-6. Ghost-written by Arthur Porritt.
- Harte, Chris (1993). A History of Australian Cricket. London: André Deutsch. ISBN 978-02-33988-25-2.
- James, C. L. R. (2005) [1963]. Beyond A Boundary. London: Yellow Jersey Press. ISBN 978-02-24074-27-8 – via Internet Archive.
- Major, John (2007). More Than A Game. London: HarperCollins. ISBN 978-00-07183-64-7 – via Internet Archive.
- Midwinter, Eric (1981). W. G. Grace: His Life and Times. London: George Allen & Unwin. ISBN 978-00-47960-54-3.
- Morrah, Patrick (1967). The Golden Age of Cricket. Eyre & Spottiswoode. OCLC 955515.
- Playfair (1948). West, Peter (ed.). Playfair Cricket Annual. London: Playfair Books Ltd. OCLC 504053943.
- Rae, Simon (1998). W. G. Grace: A Life. London: Faber & Faber. ISBN 978-05-71178-55-1.
- Ranjitsinhji, K. S. (1897). The Jubilee Book of Cricket. Edinburgh: William Blackwood & Sons. OCLC 504432811.
- Webber, Roy (1958). The County Cricket Championship. London: Sportsman's Book Club. OCLC 962487854.
- Webber, Roy (1951). The Playfair Book of Cricket Records. London: Playfair Books Ltd. OCLC 753176177.

Sporting positions
Preceded by Walter Read	English national cricket captain 1888	Succeeded by Aubrey Smith
Preceded by Aubrey Smith	English national cricket captain 1890-1891/2	Succeeded by Walter Read
Preceded by Walter Read	English national cricket captain 1893	Succeeded by Andrew Stoddart
Preceded by Lord Hawke	English national cricket captain 1896	Succeeded by Andrew Stoddart
Records
Preceded by William Ward	Highest individual score in first-class cricket 344; MCC v Kent at Canterbury 1876	Succeeded by Archie MacLaren
