= Grace family =

English cricketing family

The Grace family was an English cricketing family. Fourteen members of the family played first-class cricket, with brothers W. G., E. M. and Fred Grace (sometimes called the "three Graces") all going on to play Test cricket for England

== Members ==
=== Grace family ===
- Henry Mills Grace (1808–71), played for West Gloucestershire and South Wales in 1855.
  - Henry Grace (1833–95), played three first-class matches during the 1871 season.
  - Alfred Grace (1840–1916), played for Gentlemen of Gloucestershire and two matches for a United South of England XI in 1877 and 1879.
    - Alfred Henry Grace (1866–1929), played two first-class matches for Gloucestershire in 1886 and 1891.
  - E. M. Grace (1841–1911), played 314 first-class matches, including one Test for England.
    - Edward Grace (1873–1953), played for Thornbury Castle, a South Gloucestershire side, in 1894.
    - Edgar Grace (1886–1974), played for Gloucestershire Gypsies between 1930 and 1933.
    - Norman Grace (1894–1975), played three first-class matches for the Royal Navy between 1920 and 1927.
  - W. G. Grace (1848–1915), played 880 first-class matches, including 22 Tests for England.
    - W. G. Grace Jr (1874–1905), played 57 first-class matches.
    - Henry Grace (1876-1937), Naval officer and Chief of the Submarine Service
    - Charles Grace (1882–1938), played four first-class matches for London County Cricket Club and WG Grace's XI in 1900.
  - Fred Grace (1850–80), played 195 first-class matches, including one Test for England.

=== Gilbert family ===
George and Walter Gilbert were nephew and great-nephew respectively of Henry Mills Grace:

- George Gilbert (1829–1906), played 18 first-class matches. Later emigrated to New South Wales.
- Walter Gilbert (1853–1924), played 157 first-class matches from 1871 to 1886.

=== Pocock family ===
Alfred and William Pocock were brother and nephew respectively of Martha Grace, the mother of W. G. Grace:

- Alfred Pocock (1814–97), played for Gentlemen of Gloucestershire and South Wales between 1854 and 1863.
- William Pocock (1848–1928), played eight first-class matches for New South Wales and Canterbury after emigrating to Australia. Also umpired a first-class match in 1882.

NOTE: Some sources suggest that New Zealand cricketer Blair Pocock is related to Alfred and William, but documentary evidence has yet to be shown supporting this claim.

=== Rees family ===
William L. Rees married Martha Grace's niece, Mary Pocock. The Rees family later emigrated to Australasia:

- William Gilbert Rees (1827–98), played one first-class match for New South Wales in 1856.
- William Lee Rees (1836–1912), played four first-class matches in Australia and New Zealand.
  - Annie Rees (1864–1949) was a New Zealand writer, teacher and lawyer.
  - Arthur Rees (1866–1921), played six first-class matches in New Zealand.
  - Elizabeth Rees (1868–1933) was a New Zealand romance novelist.
  - Rosemary Rees (c.1875–1963) was a New Zealand actress, playwright and novelist.
