= Eichardt's Hotel =

Hotel in Queenstown, New Zealand

Coordinates: 45°01′58″S 168°39′38″E

General information
- Town or city: Queenstown, New Zealand
- Country: New Zealand
- Opened: 1866

Website
- https://eichardts.com/

Eichardt‘s Private Hotel is located on the corner of Marine Parade and Ballarat Street, Queenstown, New Zealand, on the shores of Lake Wakatipu. Eichardt’s is a significant local landmark, and is listed as a Category Two historic place by the Historic Places Trust.

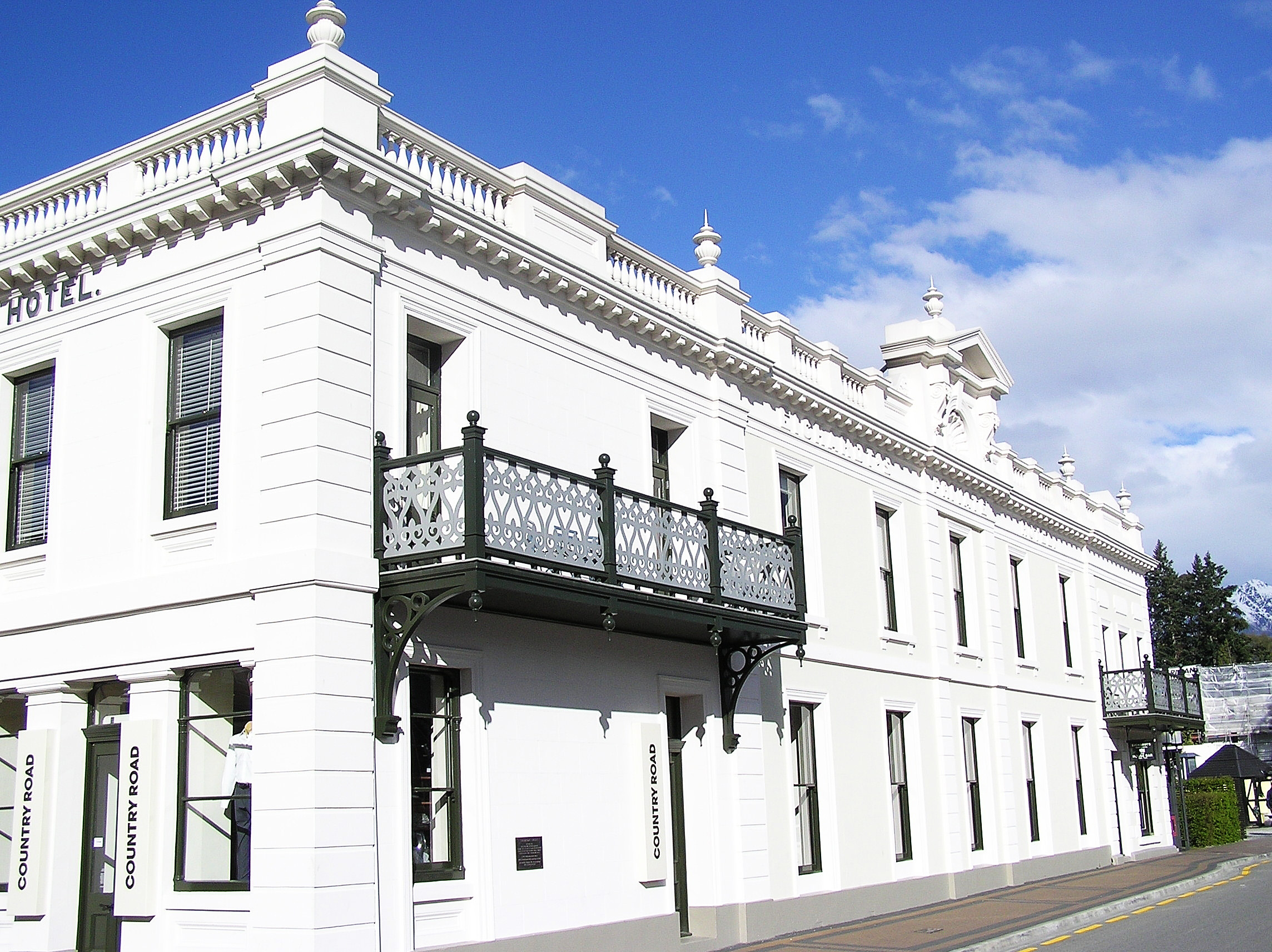
Eichardt's building in Queenstown

== History ==
William Gilbert Rees, one of the first Europeans to settle the Queenstown area, arrived at the shores of Lake Wakatipu in 1859, seeking pastoral land. Rees built a large hotel down on present day Frankton Road, a homestead on the lakefront and erected a woolshed on the site now occupied by Eichardt's Private Hotel.

When gold was discovered in the nearby Shotover River in 1862, Rees found his high country station at the centre of a gold rush - his homestead was declared an official goldfield and the main business area of Queenstown developed around his station. An entrepreneurial Rees quickly turned to the hotel keeping business, his woolshed was given a wooden facade and turned into a hotel named the Queen's Arms.

In early 1866, Rees entered into partnership with Albert Eichardt, who went on to become the sole proprietor of the hotel by 1869. Eichardt renamed the hotel Eichardt's Queen's Arms Hotel, it was renamed Eichardt's Hotel during his time.

The Eichardt's building was significantly affected by the Queenstown floods in November 1999. Following the floods, the owners undertook alterations and renovations to restore the building and reinvent Eichardt's as a luxury boutique hotel.

Eichardt's reopened as Eichardt's Private Hotel in December 2001. A member of Small Luxury Hotels of the World, the property is owned by Andrew and Sarah Cox of Melbourne. The property is also a member of the exclusive Virtuoso network and has been recommended by Andrew Harper's Hideaway Report since 2002.

== See also ==
- Otago Gold Rush
