= Hugh Lusk (cricketer) =

New Zealand cricketer

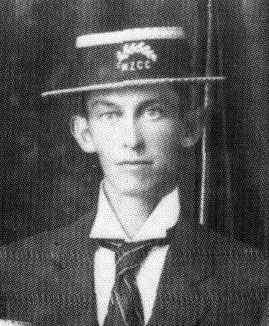
- Hugh Lusk, 1898–99

Personal information
- Full name: Hugh Butler Lusk
- Born: 12 January 1866; Mangonui, Northland, New Zealand
- Died: 26 February 1944 (aged 78); Napier, New Zealand
- Batting: Right-handed
- Relatives: Hugh Lusk (father); Harold Lusk (brother); Elizabeth Lusk (wife); William Lee Rees (father-in-law)

Domestic team information
- Years: Team
- 1889/90: Auckland
- 1891/92–1908/09: Hawke's Bay

Career statistics
Competition	First-class
Matches	38
Runs scored	1,688
Batting average	25.19
100s/50s	3/8
Top score	120
Balls bowled	2,519
Wickets	51
Bowling average	21.80
5 wickets in innings	2
10 wickets in match	1
Best bowling	7/53
Catches/stumpings	14/–
- Source: CricketArchive, 3 October 2014

Hugh Butler Lusk (12 January 1866 – 26 February 1944) was a New Zealand cricketer and lawyer.

== Life and career ==
After attending Auckland Grammar School, Lusk studied law. He was admitted to the Bar in 1890.

Lusk married Bessie Rees, a daughter of William Lee Rees and a niece of W. G. Grace, in Auckland in March 1891. He became Crown Solicitor for Hawke's Bay in 1902, succeeding another cricketer, Arthur Cotterill. He retained the position until his death. He practised law in Napier for more than 50 years and was a member of the council of the New Zealand Law Society for 30 years.

=== Cricket ===
Lusk made his first-class cricket debut for Auckland in 1889-90, playing five matches as a middle-order batsman and opening bowler. He had little success with the bat, but took eight wickets in two matches against the touring New South Wales team, including figures of 5 for 35 in the first match.

He moved to Napier, and began playing for Hawke's Bay in 1891-92. In his first match he top-scored with 62 in an innings victory over Taranaki. He was selected for North Island against New South Wales in 1893-94, second-top-scoring in each innings with 39 and 21. Now captaining Hawke's Bay, he played a leading part in the match against Wellington in 1895-96, making 14 and 41 and taking 4 for 18 and 7 for 53.

He made his debut for New Zealand in 1896-97, making 59 and 23 in a victory over Queensland. He was the only Hawke's Bay player to represent New Zealand during Hawke's Bay's period as a first-class side (1884 to 1921). With 250 runs at an average of 31.25, he was the highest-scoring New Zealand batsman of the season.

In the first match the next season Lusk scored his and Hawke's Bay's first century, 119 in a loss to Canterbury. It was the highest score of the season, and again he topped the national run tally, this time with 280 runs at 40.00. He went on New Zealand's short tour of Australia in 1898-99, but had little success in the two first-class games. In 1900-01 he scored his second century, 120, when he led Hawke's Bay to an innings victory over Auckland. He played for New Zealand against Lord Hawke's XI in 1902-03. He scored his third and final century against Wellington in 1907-08.

Lusk played his last first-class match, still as captain of Hawke's Bay, in 1909, just before his 43rd birthday. In 28 first-class matches for Hawke's Bay he scored 1395 runs at 28.46. He served as President of the New Zealand Cricket Council in the 1930s.
