= Von River =

River in New Zealand

Coordinates: 45°05′S 168°26′E

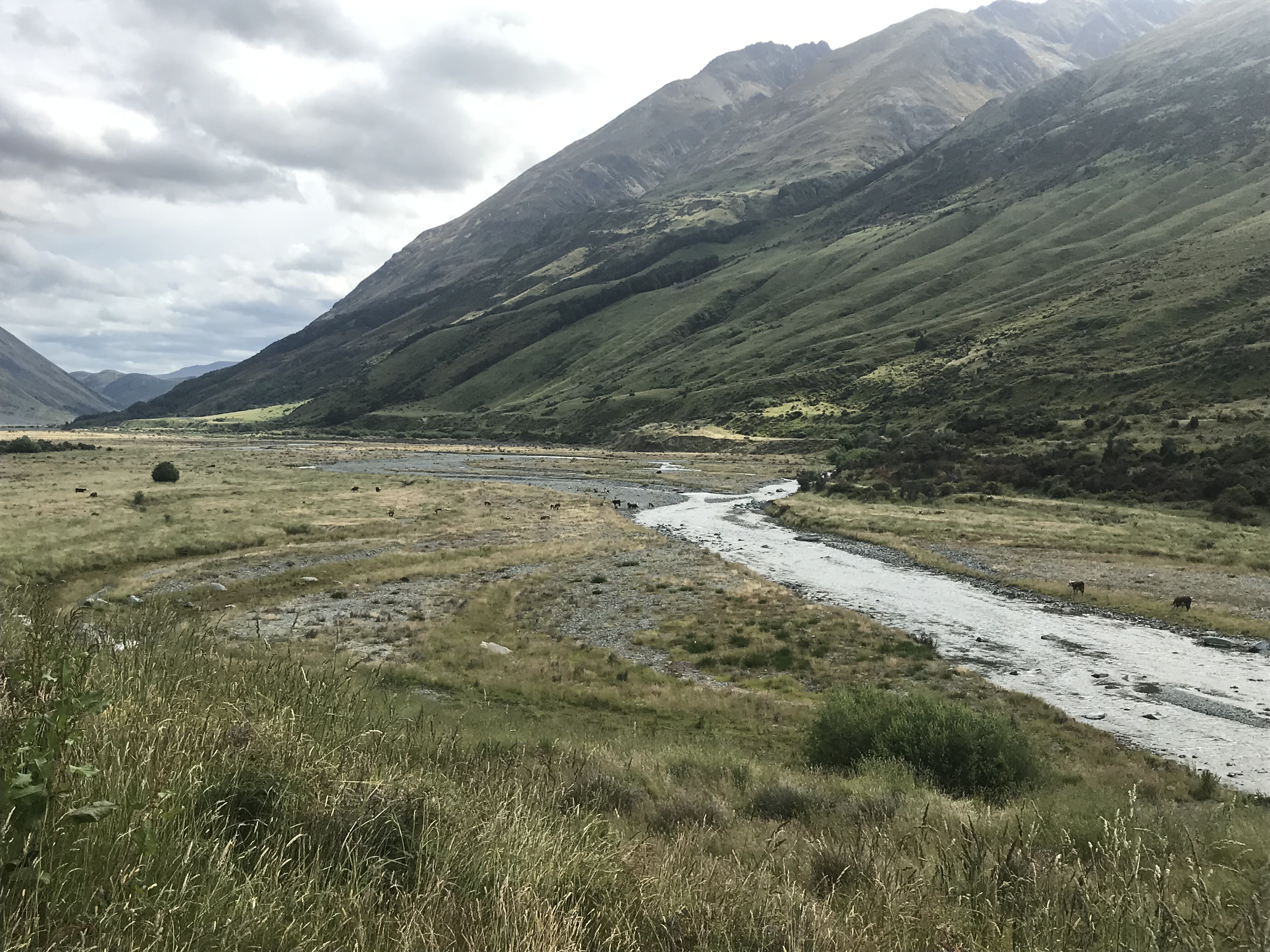
- Braided section of the Von River, with cows having unimpeded access

Location
- Country: New Zealand

The Von River is a river in New Zealand, flowing into Lake Wakatipu. It was named after explorer Nicholas von Tunzelmann.

== See also ==
- List of rivers of New Zealand
