= Scoparia vulpecula =

Scientific classification
- Kingdom: Animalia
- Phylum: Arthropoda
- Class: Insecta
- Order: Lepidoptera
- Family: Crambidae
- Genus: Scoparia
- Species: S. vulpecula

Binomial name
- Scoparia vulpecula Meyrick, 1927

Species of moth

Scoparia vulpecula is a species of moth in the family Crambidae. It is endemic to New Zealand.

== Taxonomy ==
This species was described by Edward Meyrick in 1927 from a female specimen collected by George Hudson at Bold Peak at Lake Wakatipu. However the placement of this species within the genus Scoparia is in doubt. As a result, this species has also been referred to as Scoparia (s.l.) vulpecula.

== Description ==
The wingspan is about 18 mm. The forewings are light fuscous with a few scattered whitish scales. The discal spot is cloudy and darker fuscous. The hindwings are whitish-grey, greyer near the termen. Adults have been recorded on wing in January.
