= Cecil Peak =

Mountain in New Zealand

Coordinates: 45.108831°S 168.628463°E

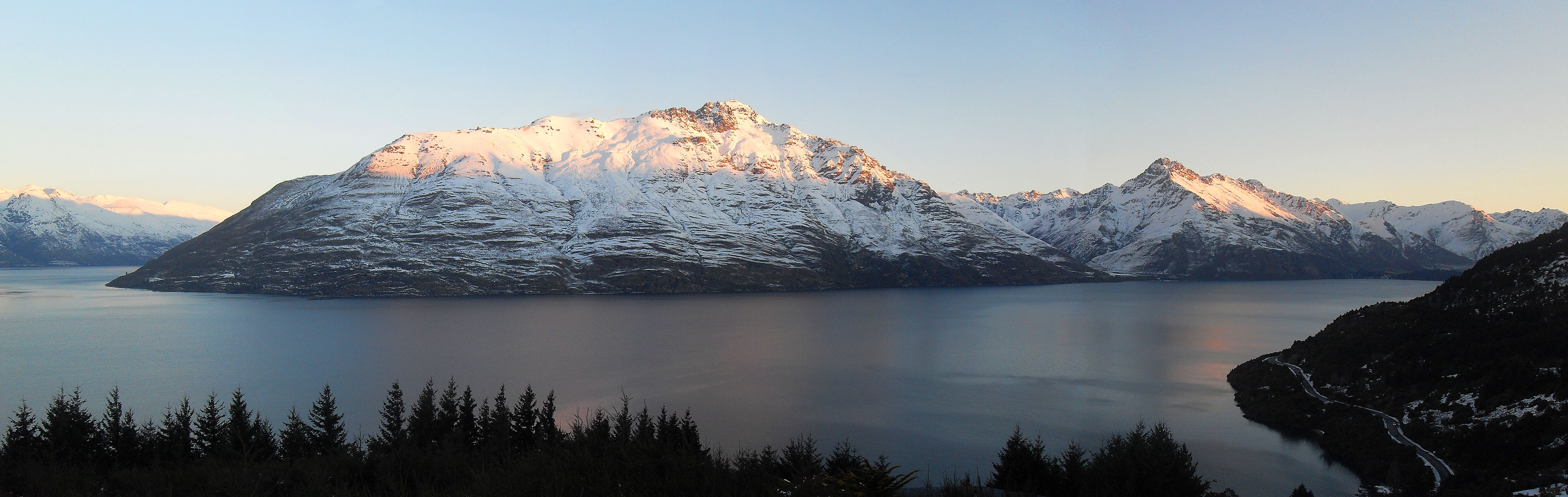
View from Fernhill of Cecil Peak (Walter Peak on right). Kā Kamu-a-Hakitekura is the Māori name for both mountains.

Cecil Peak is a mountain in the Wakatipu Basin, New Zealand and reaches a height of 1,978 metres. It is on the south side of Lake Wakatipu south-southwest of Queenstown, and is prominent within the area.

Vegetation is mainly grass and tussock (as it is under a pastoral lease), with trees near the waterline. Hidden Island is one of four islands in Lake Wakatipu and sits very close to the shoreline of Cecil Peak. On 27 March 2010 a local band performed an outdoor concert in a natural amphitheatre on the peak playing songs from the band Pink Floyd.

== Name ==
Both Cecil Peak and the nearby mountain of Walter Peak were named after William Rees' eldest son, Cecil Walter Rees, first given names by the surveyor James McKerrow in 1862.

== See also ==
- List of mountains of New Zealand by height
- Walter Peak
