= Arthur Rees (cricketer) =

New Zealand cricketer

Personal information
- Full name: Arthur Westland Rees
- Born: 9 September 1866; Hokitika, New Zealand
- Died: 1 January 1921 (aged 54); Gisborne, New Zealand
- Bowling: Slow left-arm orthodox
- Role: Bowler
- Relatives: William Lee Rees (father); Grace family

Domestic team information
- Years: Team
- 1889/90: Auckland
- 1896/97: Hawke's Bay

Career statistics
Competition	First-class
Matches	6
Runs scored	13
Batting average	1.85
100s/50s	0/0
Top score	6
Balls bowled	1400
Wickets	41
Bowling average	13.02
5 wickets in innings	4
10 wickets in match	2
Best bowling	8/36
Catches/stumpings	5/–
- Source: ESPNcricinfo, 6 May 2022

Arthur Westland Rees (9 September 1866 – 1 January 1921) was a New Zealand cricketer. He played first-class cricket for Auckland and Hawke's Bay between 1889 and 1897. In his first two first-class matches he took 25 wickets.

== Life and career ==
Rees' father, William Lee Rees, was a cousin of W. G. Grace and other members of the Grace and Gilbert families. Arthur Rees was born in Hokitika and educated at Auckland Grammar School before going to Caius College, Cambridge. He returned to New Zealand in 1889 and was admitted as a barrister and solicitor in 1890. He established a law practice in Gisborne in 1893.

A left-arm slow bowler, Rees took 32 wickets for 226 runs in the three matches of Auckland's southern tour in 1889–90. He began with 6 for 27 and 8 for 36 against Otago, bowling unchanged on his first-class debut, and a few days later took 7 for 35 and 4 for 63 against Canterbury. He was the leading bowler in New Zealand that season, with 38 wickets at an average of 10.94.

Rees married Mabel Margaret Crawford in Gisborne in May 1893. He died at his home in Gisborne early on New Year's Day 1921 after a short illness. His wife, a son and three daughters survived him.
