= 1884 East Coast by-election =

New Zealand by-election

The 1884 East Coast by-election was a by-election held on 16 June 1884 in the East Coast electorate during the 8th New Zealand Parliament.

The by-election was caused by the resignation of the incumbent MP Allan McDonald.

He was replaced by Samuel Locke. A show of hands had preferred Rees, who said he was opposed by the government.

Rees subsequently accused Locke of "corrupt practices" during the by-election. Michael Gannon decided to stand for the Bay of Islands in the 1884 election (general election) held on 22 July, and came second.

== Results ==
The following table gives the election result:

1884 East Coast by-election
Party	Candidate	Votes	%	±%
Independent	Samuel Locke	509	45.49	
Independent	Michael Gannon	315	28.15	
Independent	William Lee Rees	295	26.36	
Turnout		1119		
Majority		194	17.34	
