= 1889 East Coast by-election =

New Zealand by-election

- 13 December 1889
- Turnout: 1,300

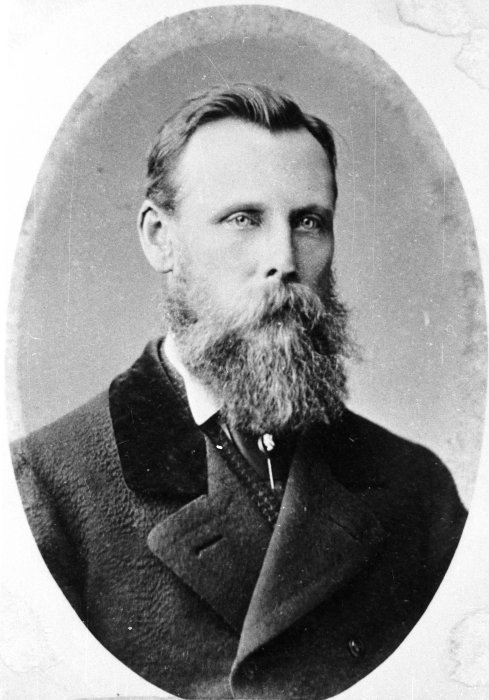
Candidate	Alexander Arthur	William Lee Rees
Party	Independent	Liberal
Popular vote	676	624
Percentage	52.00%	48.00%
MP before election
Andrew Graham
Independent
Elected MP
Alexander Arthur
Independent

The 1889 East Coast by-election was a by-election held on 13 December 1889 in the East Coast electorate during the 10th New Zealand Parliament.

== Background ==
The by-election was caused by the resignation of the incumbent MP Andrew Graham on 21 October 1889. Graham was in financial difficulty and was later declared bankrupt, which he ascribed to mismanagement of his business whilst he was on a trip to Scotland.

== Campaign ==
He was replaced by Alexander Creighton Arthur, a local runholder. Lawyer William Lee Rees, who contested the seat twice before unsuccessfully, again stood and came second. Rees was the Liberal Party's selected candidate.

== Results ==
The following table gives the election result:

1889 East Coast by-election
Party	Candidate	Votes	%	±%
Independent	Alexander Creighton Arthur	676	52.00	
Liberal	William Lee Rees	624	48.00	
Majority		52	4.00	
Turnout		1,300		

== Aftermath ==
Arthur served as MP for East Coast for only one year and was defeated in 1890 by William Kelly. Rees did not recontest the seat in 1890 and instead stood in the City of Auckland electorate and was successful.
