= Alexander Arthur (disambiguation) =

Alexander Arthur (1846–1912) was a Scottish-born engineer and entrepreneur in the United States.

Alexander or Alex Arthur may also refer to:

- Alexander Creighton Arthur, 19th century Member of Parliament in New Zealand
- Alex Arthur (born 1978), Scottish boxer
