= Hidden Island (New Zealand) =

Island in New Zealand

Coordinates: 45.070091°S 168.649298°E

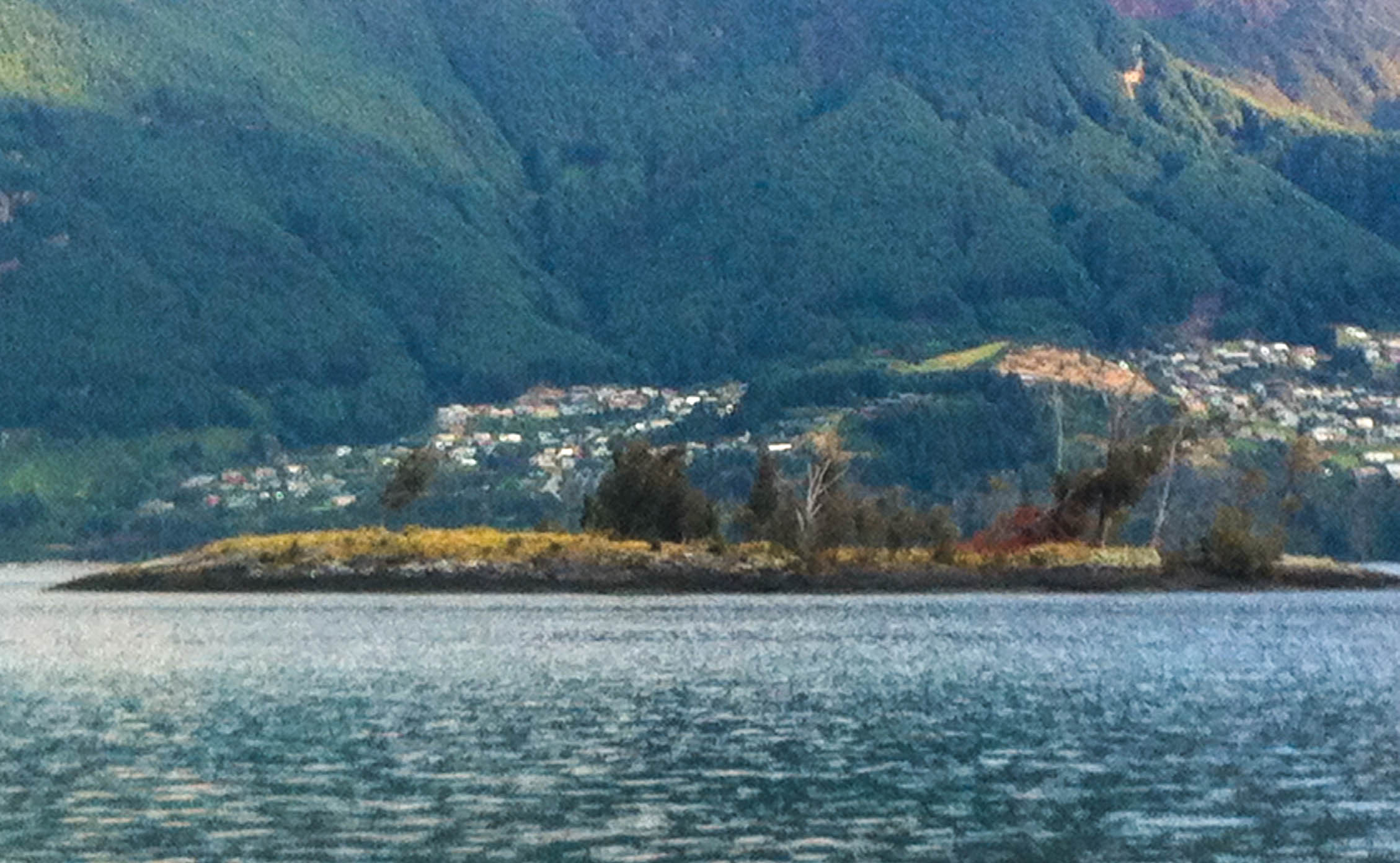
- Hidden Island when viewed from Cecil Peak
- Interactive map of Hidden Island

Geography
- Total islands: 1

Administration
- New Zealand

Demographics
- Population: 0

Hidden Island is located in the middle of Lake Wakatipu in New Zealand and is very close to Cecil Peak. Its name is because from many parts of Queenstown the island is invisible.

A local kayak company has a trip that takes you to the island from Queenstown. In 2010 two kayakers died near Hidden Island.

== See also ==
- Desert island
- List of islands
