= Andrew Graham (politician) =

New Zealand politician

New Zealand Parliament
Years	Term	Electorate	Party
1887–1889	10th	East Coast	Independent

Andrew Graham (1843 – 17 April 1926) was a 19th-century Member of Parliament from the Gisborne Region of New Zealand.

He represented the East Coast electorate from 1887 to 1889, when he resigned, shortly before his bankruptcy, which he ascribed to mismanagement of his business, whilst he was on a trip to Scotland,

He was born at East Kilbride in Scotland on 28 July 1843 to John and Elizabeth Graham. His education was at Glasgow High School and Glasgow University.

In 1864 he emigrated to Napier, where he worked for a merchant. In 1868 he joined the Poverty Bay volunteers to fight against Te Kooti. In 1873 he married Elizabeth Williams. From 1873 he was a merchant in the firm of Kinross and Graham at Gisborne. His businesses were hit by the 1878 City of Glasgow Bank collapse, as was the Poverty Bay Herald, of which he was a director. He was the first chairman of Gisborne Harbour Board, chairman of Gisborne Hospital Board and Cook County Council and session clerk at St Andrew's Presbyterian Church in Gisborne, where he was buried.

His children were Mrs. Todd (Wellington), Mrs. Dobson (Kaiti), Mrs. Burnett; (Whanganui), J. C. Graham (Waimata), A. D. Graham (Ruakituri), P. H. Graham (Wellington), William Graham (Wharekahika), Stanley Graham (Detroit), Malcolm Graham (Tolaga Bay), and J. G. Graham (Gisborne).

New Zealand Parliament
Preceded by Samuel Locke	Member of Parliament for East Coast; 1887–1889	Succeeded by Alexander Creighton Arthur
