= Nicholas von Tunzelmann =

New Zealand settler (1828–1900)

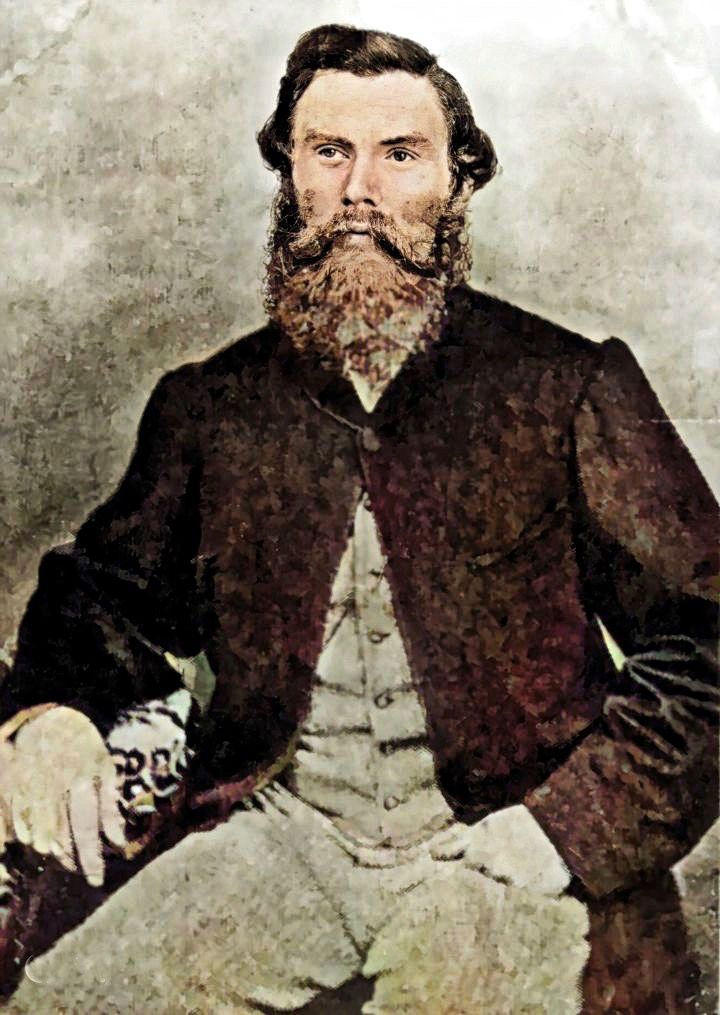
Undated portrait of Tunzelmann

Nicholas von Tunzelmann (24 August 1828 – 31 July 1900), whose full name has been recorded as Nicholas Paul Balthasar Tunzelmann von Adlerflug or Paul Nicholai Balthasar Tunzelmann von Adlerflug, with his surname often Anglicised as Tunzelman, is famous as one of the first two Europeans to explore Lake Wakatipu and the site of the future town of Queenstown, New Zealand in 1860. He and fellow explorer William Gilbert Rees were the first Europeans to settle the Wakatipu Basin.

Tunzelmann, of Prussian descent, was born in 1828 on the Baltic island of Ösel (present-day Saaremaa, Estonia), at the time part of the Russian Governorate of Livonia. He studied in Germany, Switzerland, and England. He studied medicine in Canada then London, but decided to go to India in the cavalry service as a veterinary surgeon, and studied at the Royal Veterinary College. He was naturalised in England at the age of 21.

Tunzelmann came to New Zealand in 1858. He married Gertrude Rose Gilbert. She was the sister of Frances Rebecca Gilbert, who married William Rees.

He established a high country farm at Mount Nicholas on the western side of Lake Wakatipu (i.e. opposite Queenstown). Business partners were his brother-in-law (Pickett) and a Wellington sheep farmer (Edward Pharazyn, a son of Charles Johnson Pharazyn). Pharazyn pulled out of the partnership when 1,500 of the 2,000 sheep bought by him in Melbourne died on the journey. Tunzelmann had bad luck over land regulations and lost all his capital. Encouraged by his sister, he tried fruit farming in New South Wales, Australia for five years before returning when he heard his 100-acre section at Lake Wakatipu might be lost.

Tunzelmann died in Frankton Hospital, Queenstown on 31 July 1900. His wife died on 21 April 1918. The Von River, Von Valley, and Mount Nicholas—all located on his station adjacent to Lake Wakatipu—are named after him.
