= Elizabeth Lusk =

New Zealand writer (1868–1933)

Elizabeth Lusk (1868 – 30 November 1933) was a New Zealand writer who wrote six romance novels under the pen-name Elizabeth Milton. She was the sister of novelist Rosemary Rees.

Lusk was born in Hokitika in 1868 to William Lee Rees, a barrister and MP. In March 1891 she married Hugh Butler Lusk, a lawyer and cricketer. They had three daughters and a son.

Lusk wrote her first novel, Love and Chiffon, in 1929, and sent it to Mills & Boon under the pen-name of "Elizabeth Milton". This was followed by a further five novels. Her last three novels formed a series set in the early days of New Zealand. Her novels were commercially successful.

She died after a short illness in Napier in November 1933, shortly after her final novel, Strange Horizon, was accepted.

== Works ==
- Love and Chiffon (1929)
- Wand'ring Wood (1930)
- Desert Quest (1931)
- They Called Her Faith (1932)
- Waimana (1934)
- Strange Horizon (1934)
