= East Coast (electorate) =

Electoral district

- Single-member general constituency for the New Zealand House of Representatives
- Formation: 1871, 1999
- Region: Gisborne; Bay of Plenty
- Character: Urban and rural
- Term: 3 years

Member for East Coast

East Coast was a New Zealand parliamentary electorate, returning one Member of Parliament to the New Zealand House of Representatives. The electorate first existed from 1871 to 1893, and was recreated in 1999. The current MP for East Coast is Dana Kirkpatrick of the National Party, who has held office since 2023.

== Population centres ==
The electorate's main centres are Gisborne (32,529) and Tolaga Bay in the Gisborne Region; and Ōpōtiki and Whakatane (18,800) in the eastern part of the Bay of Plenty Region. Smaller communities in the electorate include Maketu, Kawerau, Murupara, Minginui and Edgecumbe. Wairoa, the northernmost town in the Hawke's Bay region, was excluded by the 2007 boundary changes.

== History ==
The East Coast electorate was first established for the 5th Parliament in 1871. William Kelly was the first elected representative; he held the seat until the end of the term in 1875.

The "most sensational electoral contest ever held in the East Coast" electorate was held in January 1876, when mysterious pieces of cardboard were distributed by supporters of George Read in Gisborne, which hotel bars accepted as legal tender. Read, George Morris and Kelly received 215, 206 and 185 votes, with another candidate coming a distant fourth. Morris petitioned against Read's election. A parliamentary committee of enquiry determined that Read had not broken any laws by approving the initiative, but the House of Representatives resolved that Read was to be unseated in favour of Morris, which happened later in 1876. This was the last election enquiry held by a parliamentary committee. Subsequently, these enquiries were held by the courts.

At the next election in 1879, Morris was defeated by Allan McDonald, who held the electorate until he resigned in 1884.

Samuel Locke won the resulting by-election and was confirmed a few months later at the 1884 general election. He served until the end of the term of the 9th Parliament in 1887.

William Lee Rees stood unsuccessfully in this and subsequent by-elections and elections.

Andrew Graham won the 1887 general election. He resigned in 1889 before the end of the term. Alexander Creighton Arthur won the resulting 1889 by-election. Arthur and Kelly (the electorate's first representative in 1871) contested the 1890 general election, and Kelly was successful by a small margin, with 1022 to 1008 votes in his favour. He served until the end of the term in 1893, after which the electorate was abolished, and was replaced by the Bay of Plenty and Waiapu electorates.

The electorate was renamed to East Cape for the 2026 general election.

=== Members of Parliament ===
From 1871 to 1893, the electorate was represented by seven Members of Parliament. When the electorate was abolished the then current MP, William Kelly contested and won the new seat of Bay of Plenty. In 1999, the electorate was recreated from most of the Mahia, and part of the Bay of Plenty electorates. Since 1999 it has been represented by two MPs.

Key

Independent Liberal Labour National United Future Green

Election	Winner
1871 election	William Kelly
1876 election	George Read
1876 election	George Morris^{1}
1879 election	Allan McDonald
1881 election	Allan McDonald
1884 by-election	Samuel Locke
1884 election	Samuel Locke
1887 election	Andrew Graham
1889 by-election	Alexander Creighton Arthur
1890 election	William Kelly
electorate abolished, 1893–1999
1999 election	Janet Mackey
2002 election	Janet Mackey
2005 election	Anne Tolley
2008 election	Anne Tolley
2011 election	Anne Tolley
2014 election	Anne Tolley
2017 election	Anne Tolley
2020 election	Kiri Allan
2023 election	Dana Kirkpatrick
(Electorate abolished in 2026; see East Cape)

^{1} See History section above.

=== List MPs ===
The following table lists Members of Parliament elected from party lists in elections where that person also unsuccessfully contested the East Coast electorate. Unless otherwise stated, all MPs terms began and ended at general elections.

Election	List Member
2002 election	Judy Turner
2005 election	Moana Mackey
2005 election	Judy Turner
2008 election	Catherine Delahunty
2008 election	Moana Mackey
2011 election	Moana Mackey
2017 election	Kiri Allan
2017 election	Gareth Hughes

== Election results ==
=== 2023 election ===
2023 general election: East Coast
Notes:	Blue background denotes the winner of the electorate vote. Pink background denotes a candidate elected from their party list. Yellow background denotes an electorate win by a list member, or other incumbent. A ✓ or ✗ denotes status of any incumbent, win or lose respectively.						
Party	Candidate	Votes	%	±%	Party votes	%	±%
National	Dana Kirkpatrick	17,007	42.57	+6.15	14,908	36.70	+9.74
Labour	Tāmati Coffey	13,808	34.56	−17.14	12,054	29.68	−20.72
NZ First	Craig Sinclair	2,517	6.30	–	3,896	9.59	+6.15
ACT	Michael Howe	1,923	4.81	+1.56	3,599	8.86	+1.08
Green	Jordan Walker	1,765	4.42	−0.63	3,015	7.42	+1.89
Te Pāti Māori	Fallyn Flavell	1,235	3.09	–	915	2.25	+1.50
DemocracyNZ	Chris Robinson	625	1.56	–	199	0.49	–
Vision New Zealand	Leighton Packer	323	0.81	—			
Independent	Don Richards	104	0.26	—			
Independent	Monaco Caracas	68	0.17	—			
Independent	Gordon Dickson	66	0.17	—			
NZ Loyal					546	1.34	—
Opportunities					460	1.13	+0.22
NewZeal					247	0.61	+0.10 (Note: Compared to ONE Party)
Freedoms NZ					178	0.44	—
Legalise Cannabis					164	0.40	−0.03
New Conservatives					56	0.14	−0.95
Animal Justice					43	0.11	–
Leighton Baker Party					29	0.07	–
Women's Rights					25	0.06	–
New Nation					20	0.05	–
Informal votes		509			264		
Total valid votes		39,950			40,618		
National gain from Labour	Majority	3,199	8.01	−7.27			

=== 2020 election ===
2020 general election: East Coast
Notes:	Blue background denotes the winner of the electorate vote. Pink background denotes a candidate elected from their party list. Yellow background denotes an electorate win by a list member, or other incumbent. A ✓ or ✗ denotes status of any incumbent, win or lose respectively.						
Party	Candidate	Votes	%	±%	Party votes	%	±%
Labour	Kiri Allan	21,420	51.70	+18.19	21,412	50.40	+13.78
National	Tania Tapsell	15,089	36.42	−9.76	11,452	26.96	−17.07
Green	Meredith Akuhata-Brown	2,091	5.05	−2.08	2,351	5.53	+0.95
ACT	Blake Webb	1,345	3.25	–	3,305	7.78	+7.51
Advance NZ	Jennie Brown	832	2.01	–	734	1.73	–
New Conservative	Helena Nickerson	380	0.92	–	463	1.09	+0.92
ONE	Veronica King	274	0.66	–	217	0.51	–
NZ First					1,462	3.44	−6.45
Opportunities					387	0.91	−1.43
Māori Party					320	0.75	±0.00
Legalise Cannabis					183	0.43	+0.11
Vision NZ					109	0.26	–
Outdoors					55	0.13	+0.03
Social Credit					13	0.03	+0.02
Sustainable NZ					9	0.02	–
TEA					6	0.01	–
Heartland					5	0.01	–
Informal votes		838			288		
Total valid votes		41,431			42,483		
Turnout		42,771	81.53	+2.11			
Labour gain from National	Majority	6,331	15.28	+2.61			

=== 2017 election ===
2017 general election: East Coast
Notes:	Blue background denotes the winner of the electorate vote. Pink background denotes a candidate elected from their party list. Yellow background denotes an electorate win by a list member, or other incumbent. A ✓ or ✗ denotes status of any incumbent, win or lose respectively.						
Party	Candidate	Votes	%	±%	Party votes	%	±%
National	✓ Anne Tolley	17,517	46.18	−5.74	17,011	44.03	−4.39
Labour	Kiri Allan	12,710	33.51	+4.38	14,150	36.62	+13.98
NZ First	Julian Tilley	2,916	7.69	+0.55	3,820	9.89	−1.90
Green	Gareth Hughes	2,705	7.13	−0.57	1,770	4.58	−4.59
Opportunities	Lesley Immink	1,142	3.01	—	905	2.34	—
Māori Party	Rihi Vercoe	468	1.23	—	290	0.75	−0.19
Independent	Tekawe Terence Ratu	52	0.14	—			
Legalise Cannabis					124	0.32	−0.10
ACT					106	0.27	+0.04
Ban 1080					89	0.23	−0.11
Conservative					67	0.17	−3.89
Outdoors					37	0.10	—
United Future					32	0.08	−0.14
Mana Party					20	0.05	—
People's Party					15	0.04	—
Internet					7	0.02	—
Democrats					4	0.01	−0.07
Informal votes		422			188		
Total valid votes		37,932			38,636		
National hold	Majority	4,807	12.67	−10.12			

=== 2014 election ===
2014 general election: East Coast
Notes:	Blue background denotes the winner of the electorate vote. Pink background denotes a candidate elected from their party list. Yellow background denotes an electorate win by a list member, or other incumbent. A ✓ or ✗ denotes status of any incumbent, win or lose respectively.						
Party	Candidate	Votes	%	±%	Party votes	%	±%
National	✓ Anne Tolley	18,074	51.92	+3.65	17,152	48.42	−1.35
Labour	Moana Mackey	10,140	29.13	−2.69	8,022	22.64	−1.23
Green	Gavin Maclean	2,679	7.70	−0.75	3,248	9.17	−1.43
NZ First	Mere Takoko	2,485	7.14	+3.06	4,176	11.79	+3.26
Conservative	Rick Drayson	784	2.25	−2.41	1,438	4.06	+1.04
Internet	Patrick Salmon	259	0.74	+0.74			
Democrats	Harry Alchin Smith	86	0.25	+0.25	30	0.08	+0.05
Internet Mana					413	1.17	+0.42 (Note: 2014 Internet Mana swing is relative to the votes for Mana in 2011; it shared a party list with Internet in the 2014 election.)
Māori Party					334	0.94	−0.11
Legalise Cannabis					150	0.42	−0.03
Ban 1080					122	0.34	+0.34
ACT					82	0.23	−0.71
United Future					78	0.22	−0.69
Independent Coalition					17	0.05	+0.05
Civilian					13	0.04	+0.04
Focus					4	0.01	+0.01
Informal votes		305			148		
Total valid votes		34,812			35,427		
Turnout		35,575	76.69	+2.16			
National hold	Majority	7,934	22.79	+6.33			

=== 2011 election ===
2011 general election: East Coast
Notes:	Blue background denotes the winner of the electorate vote. Pink background denotes a candidate elected from their party list. Yellow background denotes an electorate win by a list member, or other incumbent. A ✓ or ✗ denotes status of any incumbent, win or lose respectively.						
Party	Candidate	Votes	%	±%	Party votes	%	±%
National	✓ Anne Tolley	14,003	48.27	−4.18	14,804	49.77	+2.15
Labour	Moana Mackey	9,229	31.82	−0.21	7,101	23.87	−7.78
Green	Darryl Monteith	2,452	8.45	+3.09	3,154	10.60	+4.24
Conservative	Kathy Sheldrake	1,352	4.66	+4.66	898	3.02	+3.02
NZ First	Tamati Reid	1,184	4.08	−2.76	2,538	8.53	+2.68
United Future	Martin Gibson	392	1.35	−1.96	271	0.91	−1.28
Mana	Val Irwin	256	0.88	+0.88	224	0.75	+0.75
ACT	John Norvill	140	0.48	+0.48	280	0.94	−1.62
Legalise Cannabis					133	0.45	+0.14
Māori Party					313	1.05	−0.38
Alliance					10	0.03	−0.03
Democrats					10	0.03	-0.004
Libertarianz					9	0.03	−0.01
Informal votes		616			233		
Total valid votes		29,008			29,976		
National hold	Majority	4,774	16.46	−3.98			

Electorate (as at 21 October 2011): 40,533

=== 2008 election ===
2008 general election: East Coast
Notes:	Blue background denotes the winner of the electorate vote. Pink background denotes a candidate elected from their party list. Yellow background denotes an electorate win by a list member, or other incumbent. A ✓ or ✗ denotes status of any incumbent, win or lose respectively.						
Party	Candidate	Votes	%	±%	Party votes	%	±%
National	✓ Anne Tolley	16,463	52.46	+7.65	15,160	47.63	+5.43
Labour	Moana Mackey	10,050	32.02	−8.78	10,075	31.65	−7.34
NZ First	Brendan Horan	2,147	6.84	+3.35	1,862	5.85	−0.92
Green	Catherine Delahunty	1,684	5.37	+1.75	2,025	6.36	+2.11
United Future	Judy Turner	1,040	3.31	−0.57	698	2.19	−0.76
ACT					816	2.56	+1.87
Māori Party					457	1.44	−0.16
Progressive					199	0.63	−0.37
Bill and Ben					175	0.55	–
Kiwi					115	0.36	–
Legalise Cannabis					99	0.31	+0.12
Family Party					83	0.26	–
Alliance					19	0.06	+0.00
Libertarianz					13	0.04	+0.02
Democrats					12	0.04	−0.03
Workers Party					10	0.03	–
Pacific					7	0.02	–
RONZ					5	0.02	+0.01
RAM					2	0.01	–
Informal votes		246			130		
Total valid votes		31,384			31,832		
National hold	Majority	6,413	20.43	+16.44			

=== 2005 election ===
2005 general election: East Coast
Notes:	Blue background denotes the winner of the electorate vote. Pink background denotes a candidate elected from their party list. Yellow background denotes an electorate win by a list member, or other incumbent. A ✓ or ✗ denotes status of any incumbent, win or lose respectively.						
Party	Candidate	Votes	%	±%	Party votes	%	±%
National	Anne Tolley	13,666	44.80	+12.17	13,070	42.20	+20.43
Labour	Moana Mackey	12,447	40.81	−10.83	12,076	38.99	−1.68
United Future	Judy Turner	1,186	3.89	−1.70	916	2.96	−3.51
Green	Catherine Delahunty	1,104	3.62	−1.35	1,316	4.25	−1.45
NZ First	Joe Glen	1,064	3.49	—	2,098	6.77	−7.11
Māori Party	John Harré	589	1.93	—	494	1.59	—
ACT	Bill Sadler	446	1.46	−0.57	214	0.69	−4.17
Destiny					336	1.08	—
Progressive					309	1.00	−0.68
Legalise Cannabis					60	0.19	−0.32
Christian Heritage					20	0.06	−1.01
Democrats					20	0.06	—
Alliance					17	0.05	−1.12
Family Rights					8	0.03	—
Libertarianz					6	0.02	—
99 MP					5	0.02	—
One NZ					3	0.01	—
Direct Democracy					2	0.01	—
RONZ					2	0.01	—
Informal votes		266			125		
Total valid votes		30,502			30,972		
Turnout		31,097					
National gain from Labour	Majority	1,219	3.99	−15.02			

=== 2002 election ===
2002 general election: East Coast
Notes:	Blue background denotes the winner of the electorate vote. Pink background denotes a candidate elected from their party list. Yellow background denotes an electorate win by a list member, or other incumbent. A ✓ or ✗ denotes status of any incumbent, win or lose respectively.						
Party	Candidate	Votes	%	±%	Party votes	%	±%
Labour	✓ Janet Mackey	14,519	51.64	+1.91	11,687	40.67	+2.79
National	Leanne Jensen-Daines	9,176	32.63		6,255	21.77	−9.77
United Future	Judy Turner	1,573	5.59		1,859	6.47	
Green	Catherine Delahunty	1,398	4.97		1,638	5.70	+1.44
ACT	Ian Swan	571	2.03	−0.21	1,396	4.86	−1.68
Alliance	Gavin MacLean	388	1.38	−5.21	336	1.17	−7.92
Christian Heritage	Tania Maria Maukau-Teare-Shelford	269	0.96		308	1.07	−1.40
One NZ	David Moat	224	0.80		83	0.29	
NZ First					3,989	13.88	+8.88
ORNZ					521	1.81	
Progressive					484	1.68	
Legalise Cannabis					147	0.51	−0.42
Mana Māori					29	0.10	−0.07
NMP					3	0.01	+0.01
Informal votes		541			122		
Total valid votes		28,118			28,735		
Labour hold	Majority	5,343	19.01	+4.73			

=== 1999 election ===
1999 general election: East Coast
Notes:	Blue background denotes the winner of the electorate vote. Pink background denotes a candidate elected from their party list. Yellow background denotes an electorate win by a list member, or other incumbent. A ✓ or ✗ denotes status of any incumbent, win or lose respectively.						
Party	Candidate	Votes	%	±%	Party votes	%	±%
Labour	Janet Mackey	13,391	49.73		10,348	37.91	
National	Matthew Parkinson	9,546	35.45		8,608	31.54	
Alliance	Gavin MacLean	1,775	6.59		2,481	9.09	
NZ First	Gray Eatwell	844	3.13		1,366	5.00	
Christian Heritage	Richard Rangihuna	645	2.40		675	2.47	
ACT	Ian Swan	604	2.24		1,784	6.54	
Mana Wahine	Harangi Manaena-Biddle	76	0.28				
Te Tawharau	Anton Kerekere	46	0.17				
Green					1,164	4.26	
Legalise Cannabis					253	0.93	
Christian Democrats					225	0.82	
Libertarianz					98	0.36	
United NZ					74	0.27	
Animals First					50	0.18	
Mana Māori					47	0.17	
McGillicuddy Serious					33	0.12	
Mauri Pacific					24	0.09	
Natural Law					23	0.08	
One NZ					23	0.08	
Republican					8	0.03	
Freedom Movement					7	0.03	
The People's Choice					3	0.01	
NMP					1	0.00	
South Island					1	0.00	
Informal votes		642			273		
Total valid votes		26,927			27,296		
Labour win new seat	Majority	3845	14.28				

=== 1890 election ===
1890 general election: East Coast
Party	Candidate	Votes	%	±%
Liberal	William Kelly	1,022	50.34	
Conservative	Alexander Creighton Arthur	1,008	49.65	
Majority		14	0.68	
Turnout		2,030	68.65	
Registered electors		2,957		

=== 1889 by-election ===
1889 East Coast by-election
Party	Candidate	Votes	%	±%
Independent	Alexander Creighton Arthur	676	52.00	
Liberal	William Lee Rees	624	48.00	
Majority		52	4.00	
Turnout		1,300		

=== 1887 election ===
1887 general election: East Coast
Party	Candidate	Votes	%	±%
Independent	Andrew Graham	744	45.17	
Independent	Allan McDonald	583	35.40	
Independent	Michael Gannon	320	19.43	
Majority		161	9.78	
Turnout		1647		
Registered electors		2,271		

=== 1884 by-election ===
1884 East Coast by-election
Party	Candidate	Votes	%	±%
Independent	Samuel Locke	509	45.49	
Independent	Michael Gannon	315	28.15	
Independent	William Lee Rees	295	26.36	
Turnout		1119		
Majority		194	17.34	

=== 1881 election ===
1881 general election: East Coast
Party	Candidate	Votes	%	±%
Independent	Allan McDonald	441	37.25	
Independent	Samuel Locke	422	35.64	
Independent	Captain Thomas William Porter	180	15.20	
Independent	Michael Gannon	141	11.91	
Majority		19	1.60	
Turnout		1184		
Registered electors		1,524		
