= William Pocock (cricketer) =

English cricketer

Personal information
- Born: c. 1848; Bristol, England
- Died: 27 September 1928 (aged 79–80); East Brighton, Victoria, Australia
- Relatives: W. G. Grace (cousin); Grace family
- Source: ESPNcricinfo, 15 January 2017

William Pocock (c. 1848 – 27 September 1928) was an English cricketer. He played eight first-class matches for New South Wales and Canterbury between 1872/73 and 1883/84. He was a cousin of W. G. Grace.

== See also ==
- List of New South Wales representative cricketers
