= Alfred Grace =

English medic, cricketer and horseman (1840–1916)

Alfred Grace (born Downend 17 May 1840, died Bristol 24 May 1916) (Note: Cricinfo gives spurious birth and death dates of 10 March 1866 and 16 September 1929. Multiple sources (some cited here) make clear that Alfred died less than a year after WG Grace. It seems Cricinfo may be referring to Alfred Henry Grace, Alfred Grace's nephew.) was an English medic and noted horseman. He was also a cricketer, one of the Grace family, a famous family of cricketers.

== Cricket ==
Alfred was one of the five Grace brothers, all of whom played cricket: his younger brothers EM Grace, WG Grace and Fred Grace all played in the first-ever Test match in 1880. All five boys were doctors like their father, but the eldest (Henry) and Alfred "took it more seriously than the others". Donald Trelford notes that "although Alfred was the least talented at cricket, he scored several centuries at club level."

Wisden's assessment of Grace's skills was pithy, summing him up as "a very useful cricketer" who didn't ever appear at Lord's. It found space to mention his "usual post" in the field was "long stop", before adding "as a player, he at no time ranked with his brothers". The British Medical Journal noted that Alfred's renown was less than his brothers', but that he played cricket "fairly", an apparent reference to controversies that surrounded WG Grace.

== Horsemanship ==
Grace's passion and skill as a horseman led him to a passion for hunting, at which he was "famous for his flair and daring", including a claim that he once jumped a stream that was 30 feet wide, and that he didn't have to buy a hunting horse for 30 years, as friends would give him horses they found difficult. As such, it appears he was known as "the hunting doctor". His skill was such that in 1872, Baily's Magazine of Sports and Pastimes described him as "decidedly one of the best men to hounds in England". He "was a brilliant horseman", according to Trelford.

== Medical career ==
The British Medical Journal's obituary of Alfred noted that he survived his younger (and hugely famous) brother WG, noted the highlights of his medical career. Alfred studied in Bristol and received MRCS in 1863 and Licenciate of the Society of Apothecaries (LSA) in 1864. He was a member of the British Medical Association and was Surgeon Lieutenant Colonel of the Royal Gloucestershire Hussars Yeoman Cavalry.

Grace's medical career was based around Chipping Sodbury. It was a busy practice, and "he attended to one hundred and fifty confinements [births] a year". As well as his military appointment, other sinecures he achieved included appointments to the local workhouse, factories, collieries and as a vaccinator. He also enjoyed boxing. During his practice, he noticed apparent benefits of dosing women who were suffering from seizures during labour with morphine, and wrote a letter about his findings, published in The British Medical Journal in 1889.

== Personal life ==
Of the five Grace brothers, his lifespan (75 years) was the longest; this despite him being the only one who smoked.

Alfred had at least two sons, one of whom (Gerald) was also a doctor. The other was also a doctor, Dr Alfred Henry Grace, who like many of his family played cricket for Gloucestershire.
