= Walter Peak (New Zealand) =

Mountain in New Zealand

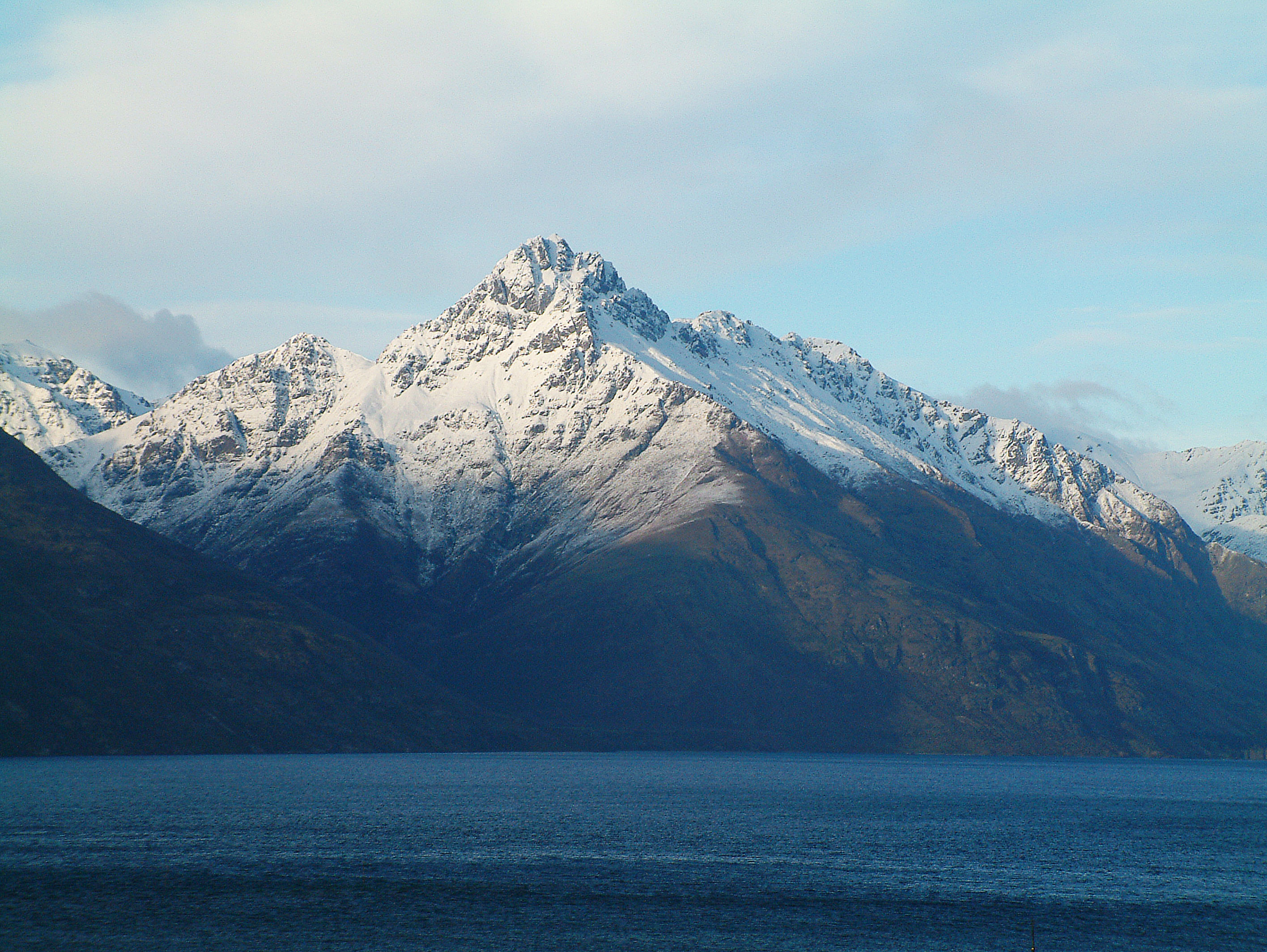
- Walter Peak as viewed from Queenstown

Highest point
- Elevation: 1,800 m (5,900 ft)
- Coordinates: 45°07′44″S 168°33′36″E

Naming
- Native name: Kā Kamu-a-Hakitekura (Māori)

Geography

Walter Peak is a mountain located near Queenstown, New Zealand. It has a height of 1,800 metres (5,906 ft).

It is regularly visited by the TSS Earnslaw steamship, which takes passengers to the base of the mountain to visit the Walter Peak High Country Farm. The Colonel's homestead, close to the steamships destination, is also popular and serves lunch and dinner.

== Name ==
Walter Peak and the nearby Cecil Peak were named after Cecil Walter Rees, the eldest son of Queenstown founder William Rees, and were named by the surveyor James McKerrow in 1862.

== See also ==
- List of mountains of New Zealand by height
