= Samuel Locke (politician) =

New Zealand politician and surveyor (1836–1890)

New Zealand Parliament
Years	Term	Electorate	Party
1884	8th	East Coast	Independent
1884–1887	9th	East Coast	Independent

Samuel Locke (1836 – 13 April 1890) was a 19th-century Member of Parliament from the Gisborne Region of New Zealand.

Locke was born in West Norfolk, England in 1836. He moved to Auckland, New Zealand in 1853 and took up work surveying. During the course of his work he became proficient in te reo Māori, being described by an Auckland newspaper as "essentially a Māori man". After losing to the incumbent Allan McDonald by 19 votes in the 1881 election, which was attributed to his broken leg preventing him from canvassing widely, he succeeded him to represent the East Coast electorate in the 1884 by-election following McDonald's resignation. In the 1884 general election, he defeated William Lee Rees. He retired in 1887 due to poor health. He was found dead in his bed on 13 April 1890, and was deemed to have died of apoplexy.

New Zealand Parliament
Preceded by Allan McDonald	Member of Parliament for East Coast; 1884–1887	Succeeded by Andrew Graham
