= William Gilbert Rees =

Founder of Queenstown, New Zealand (1827–1898)

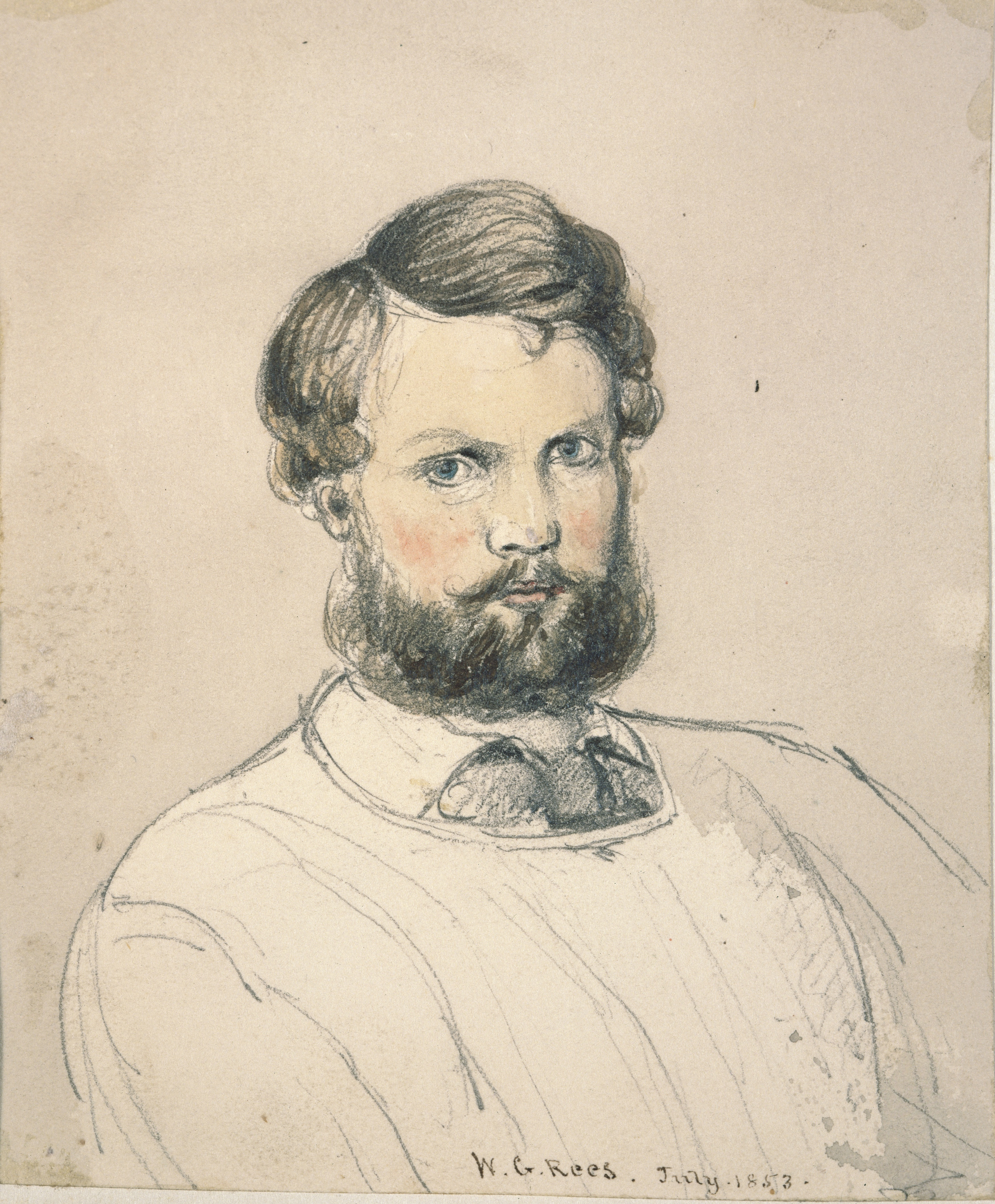
- Self-portrait from July 1853

Personal information
- Born: 6 April 1827; Haroldston St. Issell's, Pembrokeshire, Wales
- Died: 31 October 1898 (aged 71); Blenheim, New Zealand
- Batting: Right-handed
- Relatives: George Pocock (grandfather); George Gilbert (cousin); Walter Gilbert (cousin); W. G. Grace (cousin); E. M. Grace (cousin); Fred Grace (cousin); William Lee Rees (cousin)

Domestic team information
- Years: Team
- 1856/57: New South Wales
- Only FC: 14 January 1857 New South Wales v Victoria

Career statistics
| Competition | First-class |
|---|---|
| Matches | 1 |
| Runs scored | 31 |
| Batting average | 15.50 |
| 100s/50s | 0/0 |
| Top score | 28 |
| Catches/stumpings | 0/– |
- Source: CricketArchive, 21 April 2023

William Gilbert Rees (6 April 1827 – 31 October 1898) was an explorer, surveyor, and early settler in Central Otago, New Zealand. He and fellow explorer Nicholas von Tunzelmann were the first Europeans to settle the Wakatipu basin. Rees is regarded as the founder of Queenstown.

== Biography ==
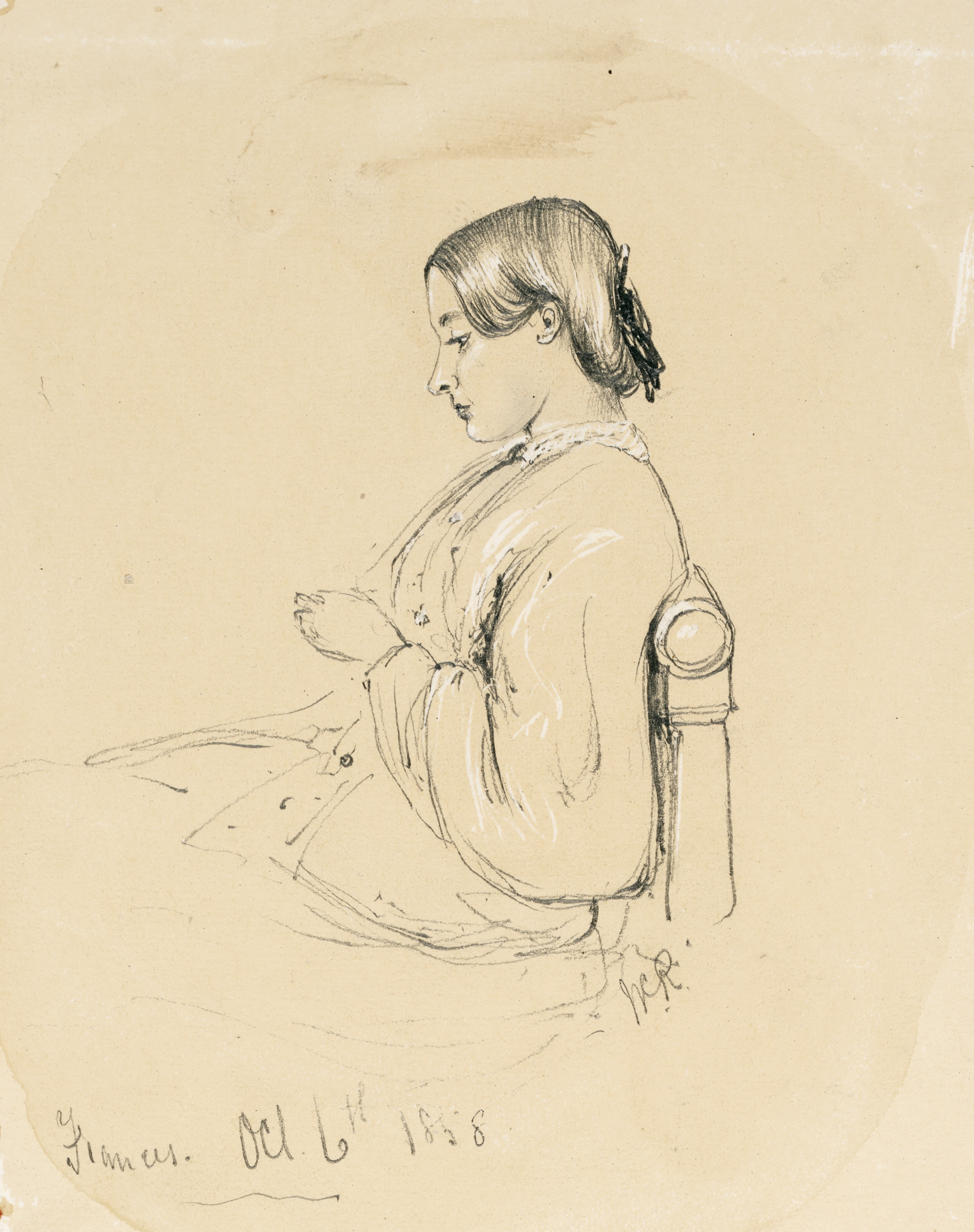
Frances Rees in 1858

Rees was born in Haroldston St. Issell's, Pembrokeshire, Wales in 1827. His father was a commander with the Royal Navy. Rees was educated at the Royal Naval School.

In 1852, Rees emigrated to New South Wales, where he became a sheep farmer. He returned to England in 1858 to marry his childhood sweetheart and cousin Frances Rebecca Gilbert (born November 1838).

He established a high-country farm in 1860 close to the current location of Queenstown's town centre. His homestead was located near the mouth of the Kawarau River, at the site of the present-day Hilton Hotel. Some historic buildings have been preserved.

The Queenstown suburb of Frankton was named after his wife Frances. Cecil Peak and Walter Peak were named after the first given names of their son, Cecil Walter Rees.

Gold was discovered not far to the northeast two years later, at which point Rees converted his wool shed into a hotel named the Queen's Arms, now known as Eichardt's. Today, Rees is considered the founding father of Queenstown.

Rees was an early New Zealand exponent of the sport of cricket, having been born into a family with prominent links to the sport. He was a member of the Grace family, and related as a cousin to W. G. Grace, an early star of the game. He appeared in one first-class match for New South Wales in 1857; his cousin William Lee Rees played for Victoria in the same match.

Rees was a devout Anglican and helped with the building of St Peter's Church in central Queenstown, which was completed in 1863. The Rees River in Central Otago is named after Rees, and his statue stands on Rees Street, Queenstown, near the town pier. There is a hotel called "The Rees" on Frankton Road in Queenstown which bears his name and a bridge on State Highway 6 named in his honour.

Rees died in Blenheim, New Zealand, on 31 October 1898, and was buried at Omaka Cemetery.

== Gallery ==
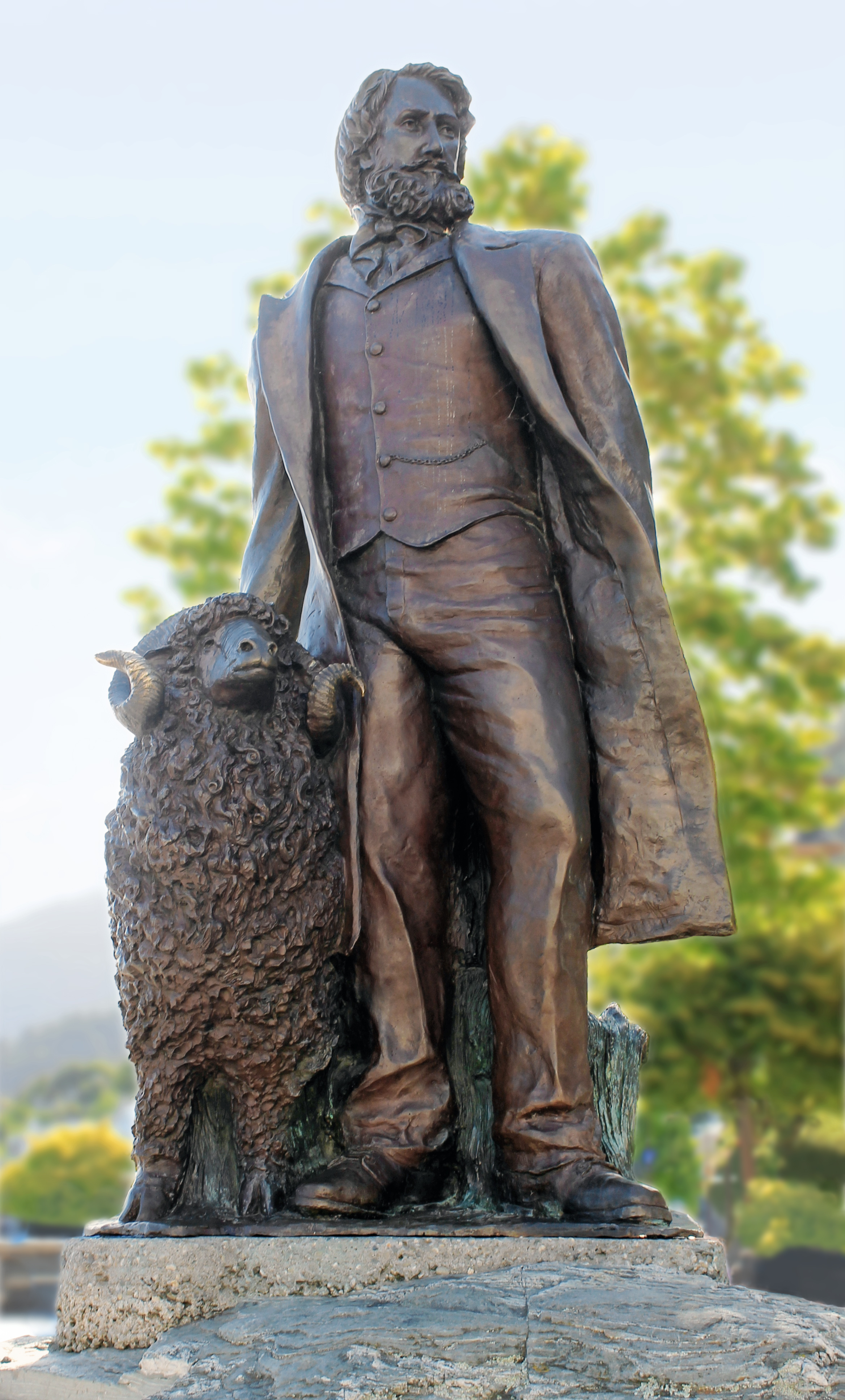
Statue of William Gilbert Rees by Minhal Al-Halabi

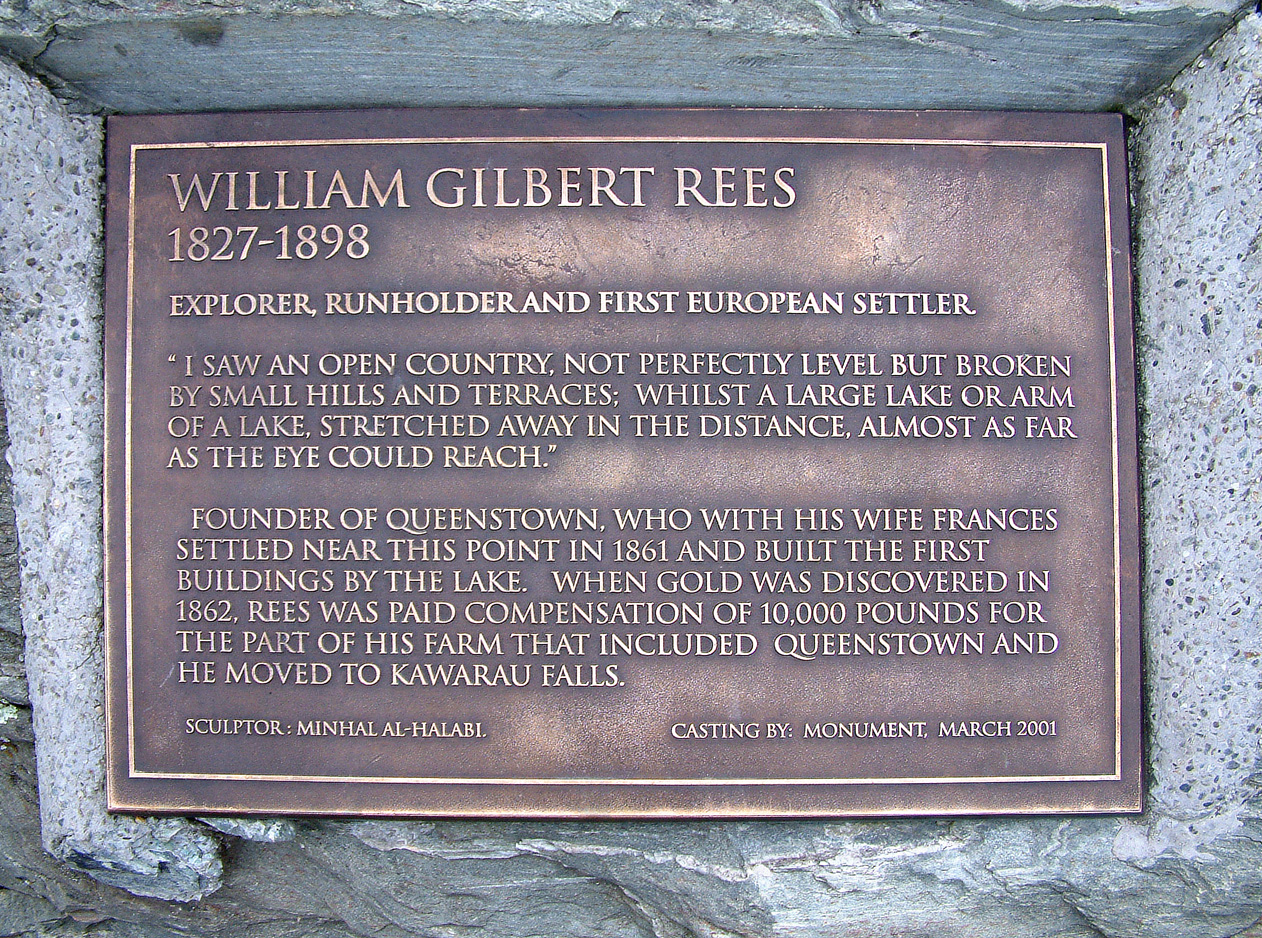
Plaque on statue of William Gilbert Rees

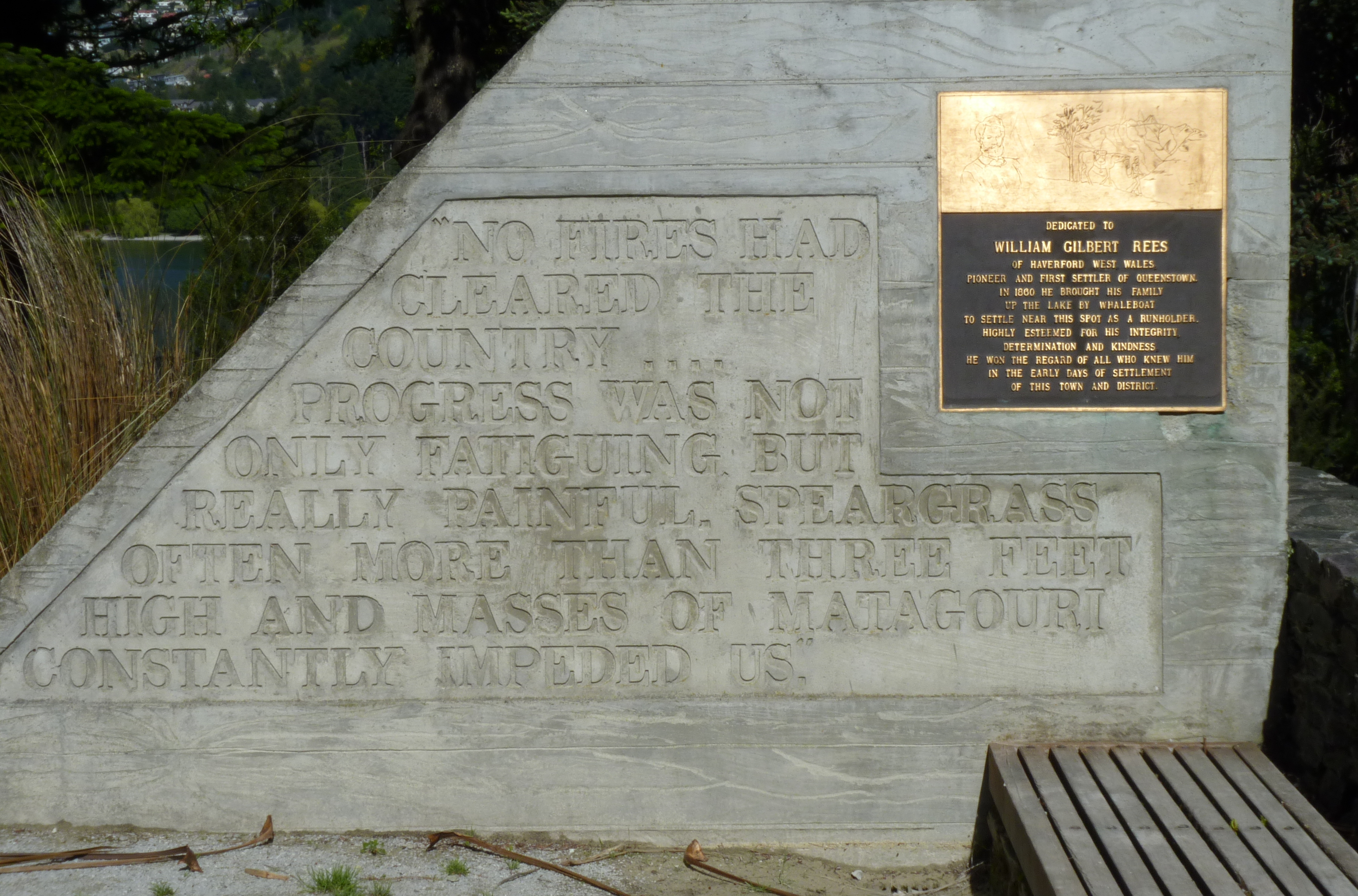
Rees Memorial in the Queenstown Gardens
