= Waimata =

Waimata or Waimatā in New Zealand may refer to:

- Waimatā, Gisborne District
- Waimata, Hauraki District
- Waimata River in the Gisborne District
