= William Lee Rees =

New Zealand cricketer and politician

William Rees
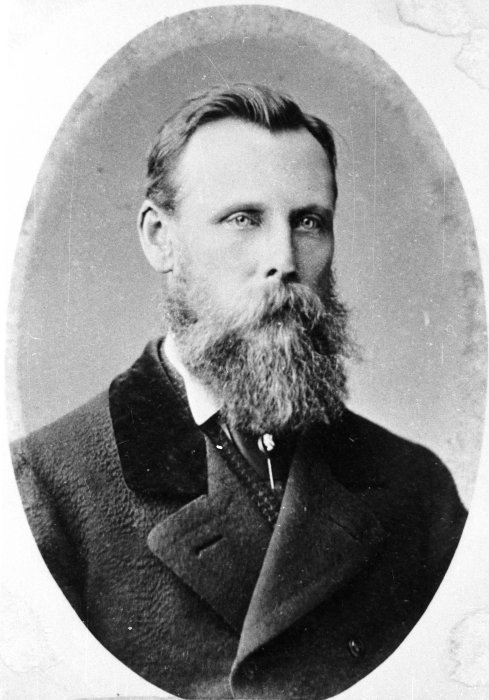
- Rees in about 1878

Personal information
- Full name: William Lee Rees
- Born: 16 December 1836; Bristol, England
- Died: 18 May 1912 (aged 75); Gisborne, New Zealand
- Relatives: William Gilbert Rees (cousin); Grace family

Domestic team information
- Years: Team
- 1856/57–1865/66: Victoria
- 1877/78: Auckland

Career statistics
Competition	First-class
Matches	4
Runs scored	65
Batting average	9.28
100s/50s	0/0
Top score	37
Balls bowled	46
Wickets	1
Bowling average	28.00
5 wickets in innings	0
10 wickets in match	0
Best bowling	1/16
Catches/stumpings	2/0
- Source: CricketArchive, 31 July 2011

William Lee Rees (16 December 1836 – 18 May 1912) was an English-born New Zealand cricketer, politician and lawyer.

== Early years ==
Rees was born in Bristol in 1836, the son of James Rees, a surgeon, and Elizabeth Pocock. Rees' father died when he was young, and he was brought up by his mother and uncle. Rees was a member of the famous cricketing Grace family, with his mother's sister, Martha Pocock, the mother of WG Grace.

He emigrated to Melbourne, with his mother, in 1851, at the start of the Victorian gold rush. He began studying law at the University of Melbourne, but was also interested in religion, training as a Congregationalist minister. He was ordained in 1861, and served as minister to the parish of Beechworth from 1861 to 1865, which included a lecture on "scepticism, credulity & faith" delivered at the Beechworth Town Hall in June 1863. He married Hannah Elizabeth "Annie" Staite in Melbourne on 8 July 1863, with whom he had seven children, including Annie Lee "Lily" Rees (1864–1949), a writer, teacher and lawyer; Elizabeth Lusk (1868–1934), a writer; and Rosemary Frances Rees (1875–1963), an author, actress, theatre producer and playwright, who founded one of the first theatre companies in New Zealand.

== Cricket career ==
Rees played four first-class matches during the early part of cricket in Australia and New Zealand. He made his first-class debut for Victoria against New South Wales in January 1857 at The Domain, Sydney, scoring two runs batting at number three. He was run out for a duck in the second innings. His cousin, William Gilbert Rees, playing in the same match, made 28 in the first innings before being dismissed leg before wicket by Tom Wills. Inter-colonial matches were sporadic at the time due to travelling distances, and Rees did not play again until October 1857, when he appeared for Gentlemen of Victoria against Players of Victoria, although the match was not awarded first-class status. Rees was dismissed for a duck in each innings. Rees' next match was against New South Wales in January 1858, where he made one and three in either innings. The New South Wales team was captained by George Gilbert, a cousin, who took 11 wickets for the match, including Rees in the first innings.

== Politics ==
New Zealand Parliament
Years	Term	Electorate	Party
1875–1879	6th	Auckland City East	Independent
1890–1893	11th	Auckland	Liberal

Rees moved from Otago to Hokitika, where he stayed for three years before moving to Auckland. He represented the Kanieri riding on the Westland County from December 1868 to November 1869.

He was elected to the Auckland City East electorate in the 1875 election, defeating James Clark 300 votes to 266. At the 1879 election, he was defeated for Auckland North. He supported Sir George Grey, and with Wi Pere set up a Trust for dealing with Maori land.

In the 1884 by-election and the subsequent 1884 election, he contested the East Coast electorate and was defeated both times by Samuel Locke. He was defeated in the 1889 by-election for East Coast, by Alexander Creighton Arthur.

He was elected to the multi-member City of Auckland electorate in 1890 election and resigned shortly before the end of the term of the 11th Parliament in July 1893. He supported the Liberal Government and was Chairman of Committees from 1891 to 1893.

== Retirement and death ==
In 1893, Rees accused Alfred Cadman, the Member for Thames, of using his position as Minister for Native Affairs for personal gain. Cadman inconclusively sued Rees for libel, and challenged him to a by-election contest for Rees' seat, City of Auckland, which Rees lost. Rees then retired from parliamentary politics, returning to Gisborne, where most of his family lived and where he had business interests. He lived at Te Hapara for most of the rest of his life, participating in several philanthropic gestures, including the installation of the first cricket pitch and tennis courts in Gisborne. He died at Gisborne on 18 May 1912 and was buried at Makaraka Cemetery.

== Books by William Rees ==
- The Coming Crisis: A sketch of the financial and political condition of New Zealand with the causes and probable results of that condition (1874).
- Sir Gilbert Leigh, or, Pages from the History of an Eventful Life, with an appendix, The Great Pro-consul (1878) (a novel).
- Co-operation of Land, Labour and Capital (1885).
- From Poverty to Plenty, or, the Labour Question Solved (1888).
- The Life and Times of Sir George Grey, K.C.B. (1892) (written with Lily Rees).

== Sources ==
- Scholefield, Guy (1950) [First published in 1913]. New Zealand Parliamentary Record, 1840–1949 (3rd ed.). Wellington: Govt. Printer.
- Wilson, Jim (1985) [First ed. published 1913]. New Zealand Parliamentary Record, 1840–1984 (4th ed.). Wellington: V.R. Ward, Govt. Printer. OCLC 154283103.

Political offices
Preceded by Westby Perceval	Chairman of Committees of the House of Representatives; 1891–1893	Succeeded by Arthur Guinness
New Zealand Parliament
Preceded by Julius Vogel	Member of Parliament for Auckland City East; 1875–1879	Succeeded by William Speight
