= Allan McDonald (New Zealand politician) =

New Zealand politician

New Zealand Parliament
Years	Term	Electorate	Party
1879–1881	7th	East Coast	Independent
1881–1884	8th	East Coast	Independent

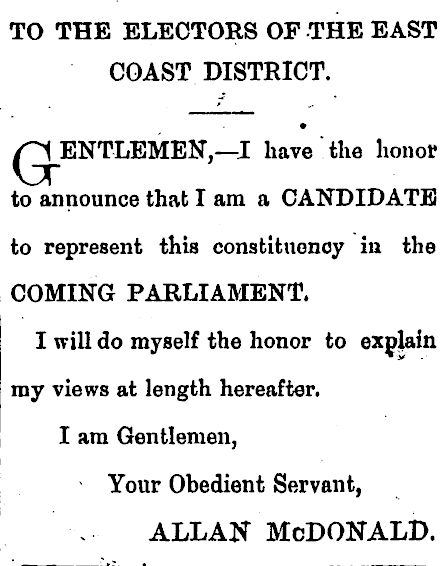
1879 election advert placed by McDonald in The Poverty Bay Herald

Allan McDonald was a 19th-century Member of Parliament from the Gisborne Region of New Zealand.

He represented the East Coast electorate from 1879 to 1884, when he resigned. The next year he was elected mayor of Gisborne unopposed, but resigned before the 1886 election due to the death of his property manager. He went missing on 24 May 1893, last being seen at a hotel on Flinders Street in Melbourne.

== See also ==
- List of people who disappeared mysteriously (pre-1910)

New Zealand Parliament
Preceded by George Morris	Member of Parliament for East Coast; 1879–1884	Succeeded by Samuel Locke
