= Andrew Harper's Hideaway Report =

Andrew Harper's Hideaway Report is a membership-based editorial travel publisher that reviews luxury hotels and resorts around the world. The first issue appeared in 1979. "Andrew Harper" was the pen name of the original editor-in-chief. The publisher is Andrew Harper, which is part of the Global Travel Collection, a division of Internova.

Concerned about the influence of commercial considerations on travel reviews, he traveled anonymously and paid his own expenses. The editorial team continues that tradition today, visiting hotels incognito and reporting back to members what they find. The publication releases its Editors' Choice Awards each year, highlighting the hotels that stood out as the best over the past 12 months.

Members of Andrew Harper receive a monthly newsletter, regional guidebooks, travel planning with Andrew Harper travel advisors and exclusive amenities and special offers.
