= Annie Lee Rees =

New Zealand writer, teacher, lawyer, community leader

- Born: 24 April 1864; Beechworth, Australia
- Died: 20 August 1949 (aged 85); Gisborne, New Zealand
- Other name: Lily Rees
- Education: University of Otago
- Occupations: Writer, teacher, lawyer and community leader
- Parents: William Lee Rees (father); Hannah (Annie) Elizabeth Staite (mother)

Annie Lee Rees (24 April 1864 – 20 August 1949) was a New Zealand writer, teacher, lawyer and community leader. She earned a law degree and was admitted to the Bar in September 1910.

== Life and work ==
Rees was born in Beechworth, Victoria, Australia, the eldest of seven children of Hannah (Annie) Elizabeth Staite and her husband, William Lee Rees, who became a congregational minister, lawyer and Liberal politician. The family emigrated to Dunedin, New Zealand in 1866 and later lived at Hokitika, Auckland, Napier and Gisborne where Annie Rees died.

Widely known as Lily Rees, she helped father write political pamphlets during her 20s and published articles on historical and current topics.

In 1898 she leased a college in Dunedin, Obern Lodge Private School, a secondary school for young women, and while principal there she passed her first law exams but in spite of her leadership, the school failed to attract future pupils. In April 1902, along with 19 other women from New Zealand, Rees was selected to teach children in the Boer concentration camps of South Africa. From her experience there as part of the 'Learned Eleventh,’ as the cadre of teachers was called, she published accounts of the camps in the New Zealand press. With the dissolution of the camps in 1906, Lily stayed on in South Africa to teach at Pietersburg high school.

Back in New Zealand, Rees gained an LLB from the University of Otago and was admitted to the Bar in September 1910. She briefly practiced law with her father at his firm before opening a school for girls, Cook County College, in 1912 in Gisborne, which she ran until 1923. After her father's death, Lily gave up law entirely.

Lily Rees never married, and died in Gisborne on 20 August 1949, at the age 85.

== Honors and distinctions ==
- Received New Zealand's Coronation Medal (1937).
