= Rosemary Rees (New Zealand writer) =

New Zealand actress, theatre producer and novelist

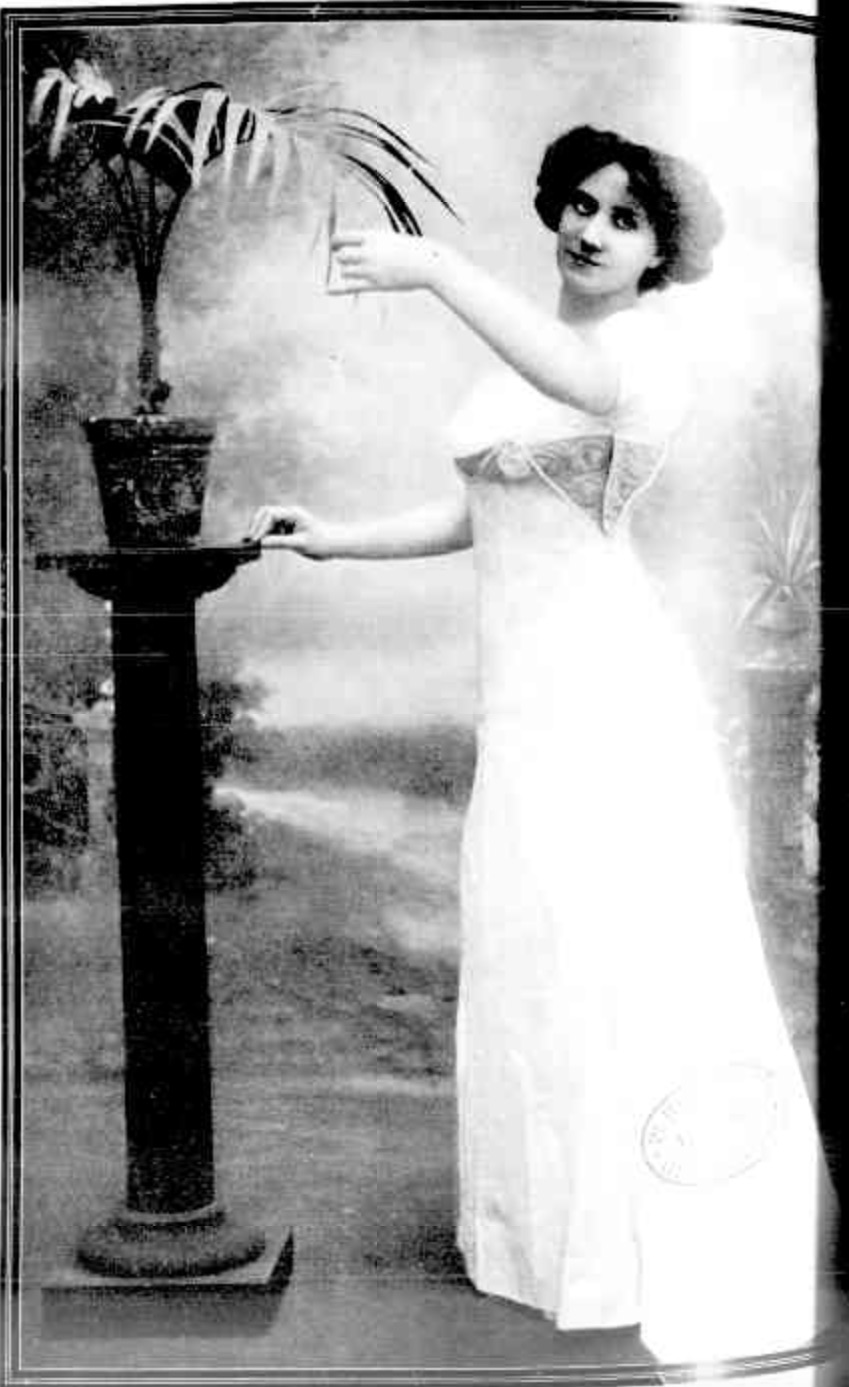
Rosemary Rees in 1910

Rosemary Frances Rees (c.1875 – 19 August 1963) was a New Zealand actress, playwright, theatre producer and novelist. She worked in New Zealand, Australia and England. After her career in theatre she became a romantic novelist.

== Early life ==
Rosemary Rees was born in Auckland, New Zealand in 1875 or 1876 to William Lee Rees, a barrister and MP. From a young age she was determined to become an actress.

== Career ==
Rees worked as an actress in New Zealand before moving to England in about 1900 or 1901. In 1901 she joined Fanny Brough's theatre company becoming Brough's understudy after one month. Her first one act play The New Gun was performed as a curtain raiser to Uncles and Aunts, by William Lestocq and Walter Everard, in 1902. She also toured with the companies of Mr and Mrs Lewis Waller, Fred Ash, Walter Melville and Mr Van Biene among others. She wrote articles and short stories for the magazines Madame, The King and M.A.P. Several of her one act plays were produced in this period: in 1907 A Judicial Separation in Manchester and Her Dearest Friend in London; A Desperate Marriage in Brighton in 1908; The Happiest Woman in the World in Bournemouth in 1909.

In 1908 she returned to New Zealand. In 1909 she presented, at His Majesty's Theatre in Gisborne, an evening's entertainment which included three of her own one act plays: the comedy A Judicial Separation, the drama The New Gun and the comedietta Her Dearest Friend.

Rees returned to England in 1911 where she continued to act, write and produce plays. In 1913 she produced and acted in her comedy sketch, Uncle Bill, at the Grand Theatre, Clapham. It was also produced at The Globe Theatre in London and The Vaudeville Theatre in The Strand, London (as a curtain raiser to Jerome K. Jerome's play Robina in Search of a Husband). In 1915 she acted in her own one act play Will You Walk into my Parlour at the Artillery in Woolwich; it was a curtain raiser for H. A. Vachell's play Searchlights'. She had a starring role in Searchlights'.

In 1914 Rees took an injunction (Rees vs. Robbins) against theatre managers Walter and Frederick Robbins, better known as Walter and Frederick Melville, for infringement of copyright. Rees sought to prevent performances of the Melville's play The Beggar Girl's Wedding on the grounds that it had great similarities to a play she had written in 1906 called A Beggar Bride and which had been read by the Melvilles; she had changed the title of the play to A Desperate Marriage and it was performed in Brighton in 1908. The playwright and actress Cecily Hamilton gave evidence in the case. The court found there had been no infringement of copyright because as melodramas they would have many similarities in their plots and stock characters.

During World War I Rees decided to dedicate herself to the war effort. Initially she worked on the New Zealand War Contingent Association's Entertainment Committee entertaining New Zealand soldiers in England; she gave out 20,000 tickets to New Zealand soldiers which she obtained from her contacts in the theatre world. By 1917 her health had deteriorated from overwork on the Entertainments Committee and, ordered to rest, she was offered a free trip to New Zealand by the military authorities. Instead, in early 1918, she joined one of Lena Ashwell's touring theatrical companies (the Lena Ashwell Dramatic Party), based in Rouen, entertaining the troops. She did this for 14 months; after the Armistice the Dramatic Party entertained the wounded at Ypres in Belgium and at Arras and Douai in Northern France.

After recovering in London from a breakdown in 1919 she returned to New Zealand where she managed her own touring theatre company; one of the actors was the writer Ngaio Marsh. In 1921 her theatre company, The Rosemary Rees English Comedy Company, performed The Mollusc by Hubert Henry Davies in Wellington, Christchurch and Dunedin, and other small towns. It also performed Rees's own plays Will You Walk into my Parlour and the comedy The Amateur Adventuress. The company foundered after three to five months because Rees was unable to pay salaries and she moved to Australia to find work in the theatre there, though she returned to New Zealand to tour with the J. C. Williamson company in 1922.

While in Australia Rees had begun to write romantic novels, giving up acting to become a successful writer. Her novels were published in England and the United States. She made an important contribution to the development of light romance writing in New Zealand. The reviewer for the Dunedin Evening Star said of her first novel, April's Sowing: "Few New Zealand novels are convincing, but this one is. Miss Rees has a story to tell, and she gets it in the right setting. Her descriptions of the back-blocks township and of the country are very apt, and the characters are real and true to type. It is one of the best New Zealand novels that we have ever read." The critic Bart Sutherland, writing in 1931 in The New Zealand Herald, defended Rees against her more dismissive critics: "although her books have been dubbed 'pleasant and sentimental, with too much local colour for true artistry', I must confess (with a fitting sense of being possessed of an inferior mentality) that I read Lake of Enchantment with real pleasure."

During the 1920s and 1930 Rees travelled and worked in Australia, England and America. In 1938 she was living in London and was sometimes mistaken for an airwoman with the same name. During World War II she lived in London with her sister May. There, she worked as an air-raid warden and in an aircraft factory. They returned to New Zealand in 1955. Rees died in Chelsea Private Hospital in Gisborne on 19 August 1963.

Rosemary Rees was well known in New Zealand, Australia and England as a writer and actor. She attempted to create a permanent theatre in New Zealand, but competition from cinema and radio plus the country's small population and high cost of touring made touring theatre unviable. She is most remembered for her success as a romantic novelist.

== Works ==
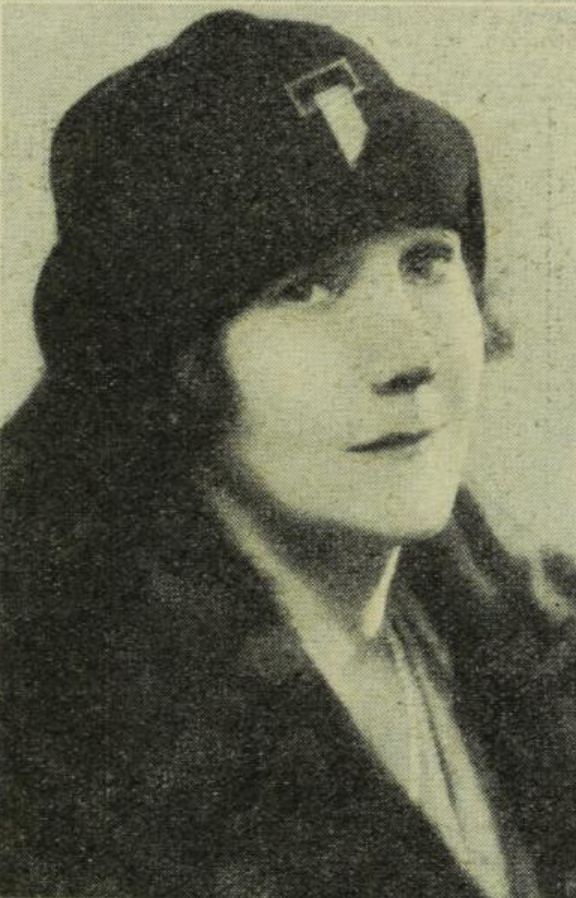
Rosemary Rees in 1928

=== Novels ===
- April's Sowing (1923)
- Lake of Enchantment (1925)
- Dear Acquaintance (1929)
- Heather of the South (1930?)
- Wild, Wild Heart (1932)
- Local Colour (1933)
- Sane Jane (1933)
- Concealed Turning (1934)
- Hetty Looks for Local Color (1935?)
- "Life's What you Make It" (1936)
- Turn the Hour (1937)
- Home's Where the Heart Is (1937)
- Sing a Song of Sydney (1938)
- Miss Tiverton's Shipwreck (1939)
- Sackcloth for Susan (1941)
- You'll Never Fail Me (1946)
- Penelope Waits (1947)
- I Can Take Care of Myself (1947?)
- The Mended Citadel (1949)
- Displaced Person (1951)
- She Who Loves (1952)
- The Five Miss Willoughbys (1955)
- Better to Trust (1956)
- Love in a Lonely Land (1958)
- The Proud Diana (1962)

=== Non-fiction ===
- New Zealand Holiday (1936)

=== Plays ===
- The New Gun (1902)
- A Judicial Separation (1907)
- Her Dearest Friend (1907)
- A Desperate Marriage (1908)
- The Happiest Woman in the World (1909)
- Uncle Bill (1913)
- Will You Walk into My Parlour (1915)
- The Amateur Adventuress (?1921)
