= Alexander Creighton Arthur =

New Zealand politician

New Zealand Parliament
| Years | Term | Electorate | Party |
|---|---|---|---|
| 1889–1890 | 10th | East Coast | Independent |

Alexander Creighton Arthur (1851–9 January 1914) was a 19th-century Member of Parliament and runholder from the Gisborne Region of New Zealand.

== Biography ==
Arthur, known as "A.C.", was one of Gisborne's earliest settlers, arriving in the 1870s. He was a owned the Willows estate at Matahero. He also owned the Tokomaru Bay and Whatatutu stations.

He represented the East Coast electorate from December 1889 to 1890, when he was defeated.

In the mid-1890s Arthur moved to England. He died on 9 January 1914 in London. He was survived by his wife, two sons and two daughters.

New Zealand Parliament
| Preceded by Andrew Graham | Member of Parliament for East Coast; 1889–1890 | Succeeded by William Kelly |
