= Lake Wakatipu =

Lake in the South Island of New Zealand

- Whakatipu Waimāori (Māori)
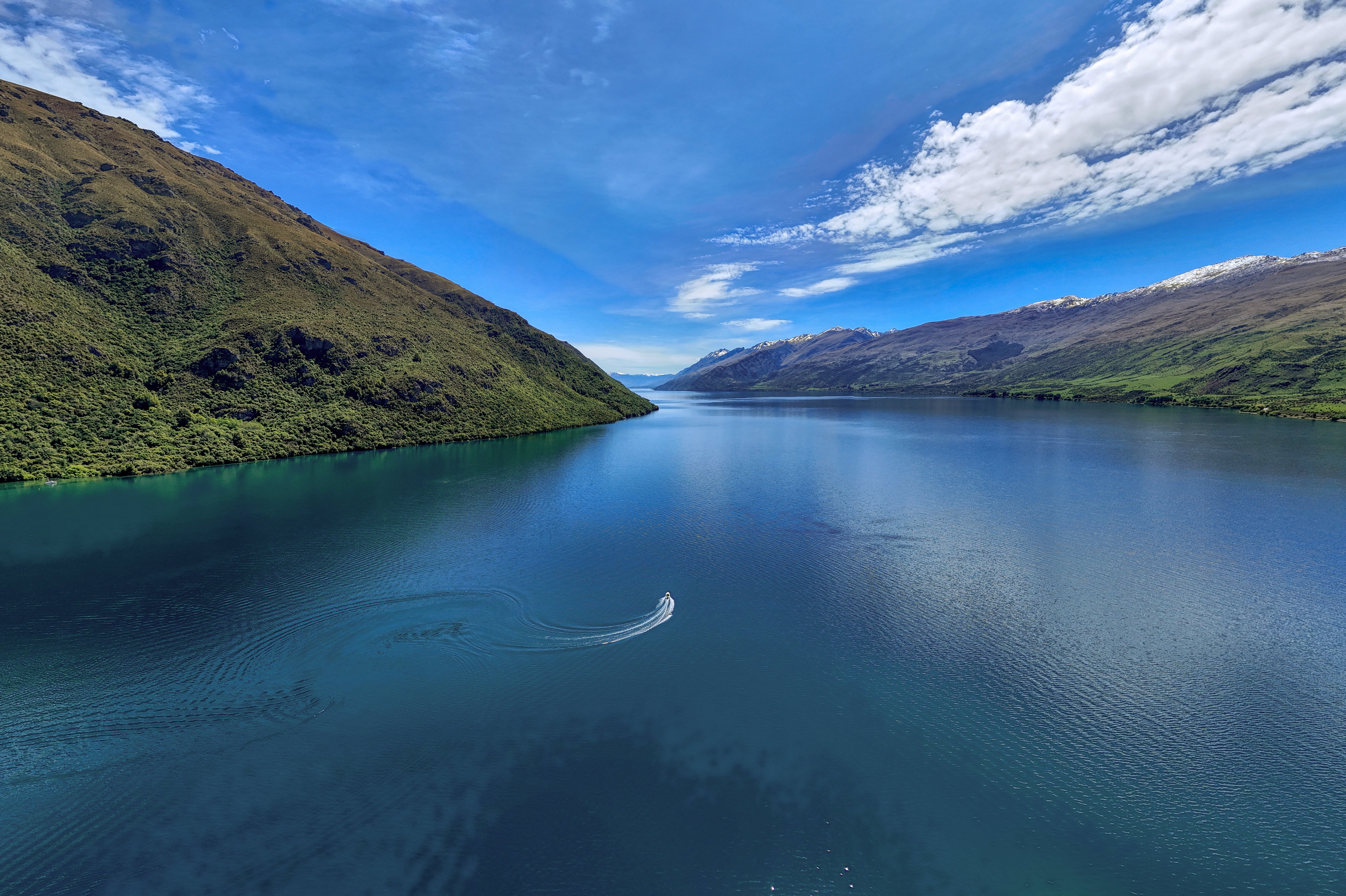
- View of Lake Wakatipu from Kingston

- Lake Wakatipu is in the Otago Region of the South Island.
- Interactive map of Lake Wakatipu
- Location: Queenstown-Lakes District, Otago Region, South Island
- Coordinates: 45°3′S 168°30′E
- Lake type: Glacial lake
- Primary inflows: Dart River / Te Awa Whakatipu, Rees River
- Primary outflows: Kawarau River
- Catchment area: 2,674 km^{2} (1,032 sq mi)
- Basin countries: New Zealand
- Max. length: 80 km (50 mi)
- Max. width: 5 km (3.1 mi)
- Surface area: 295.4 km^{2} (114.1 sq mi)
- Average depth: ~217 m (712 ft)
- Max. depth: 420 m (1,380 ft)
- Water volume: 64.2 km^{3} (15.4 cu mi)
- Residence time: c. 12 years
- Surface elevation: 309 m (1,014 ft)
- Islands: Pig Island, Pigeon Island, Tree Island & Hidden Island.
- Settlements: Kingston, Queenstown, Glenorchy

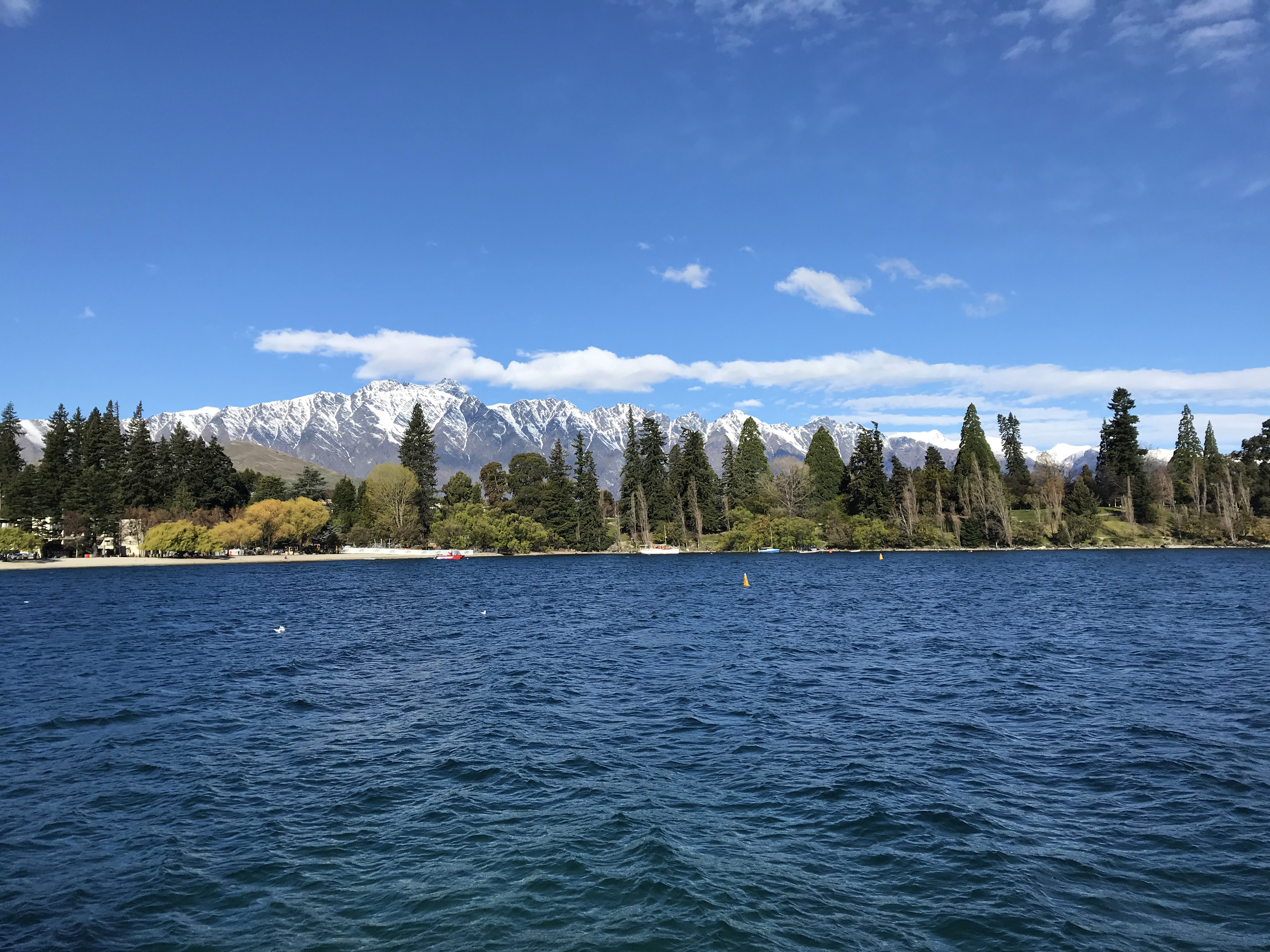
Lake Wakatipu and The Remarkables

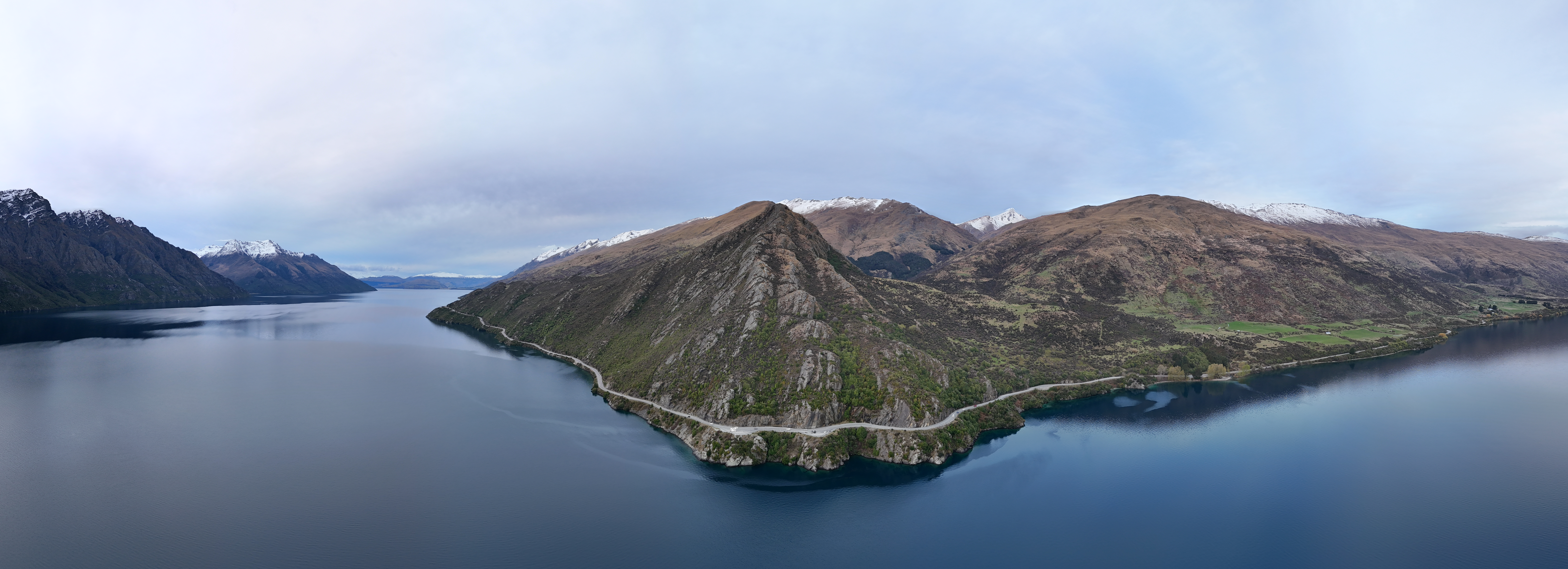
Devil's Staircase at Lake Wakatipu aerial panorama

Lake Wakatipu (Māori: Whakatipu Waimāori) is an inland lake (finger lake) in the South Island of New Zealand. It is in the southwest corner of the Otago region, near its boundary with Southland. The name Wakatipu comes from the Māori name of the lake; there are two different etymologies as to the origin of the name.

With a length of 80 kilometres (50 mi), it is New Zealand's longest lake, and, at 295 km^{2} (114 sq mi), its third largest. The lake is also very deep, its floor being below sea level (−111 metres, or 364 feet), with a maximum depth of 420 metres (1,380 ft). It is at an altitude of 309 m (1,014 ft), towards the southern end of the Southern Alps. The general topography is a reversed "N" shape or "dog leg". The Dart River flows into the northern end, the lake then runs south for 30 kilometres before turning abruptly to the east. Twenty kilometres (12 miles) further along, it turns sharply to the south, reaching its southern end 30 kilometres (19 mi) further south, near Kingston. At the north end of the lake is the settlement of Glenorchy, in the north-east corner, and the smaller isolated locality of Kinloch in the north-west corner.

The lake is drained by the Kawarau River, which flows out from the lake's only arm, the Frankton Arm, 8 km (5.0 mi) east of Queenstown. Until about 18,000 years ago the Mataura River drained Lake Wakatipu. The Kingston Flyer follows part of the former river bed now blocked by glacial moraine. Queenstown is on the northern shore of the lake close to the eastern end of its middle section. It has a seiche period of 26.7 minutes which, in Queenstown Bay, causes the water level to rise and fall some 200 millimetres (8 in).

Lake Wakatipu is known for its scenery and is surrounded by mountains. Two mountain ranges, the Remarkables and the Tapuae-o-Uenuku / Hector Mountains, lie along its southeastern edge. It is a common venue for adventure tourism, with skifields, paragliding, bungy jumping and tramping tracks within easy reach. A vintage steamboat, the TSS Earnslaw regularly plies its waters. Several vineyards are nearby in Gibbston.

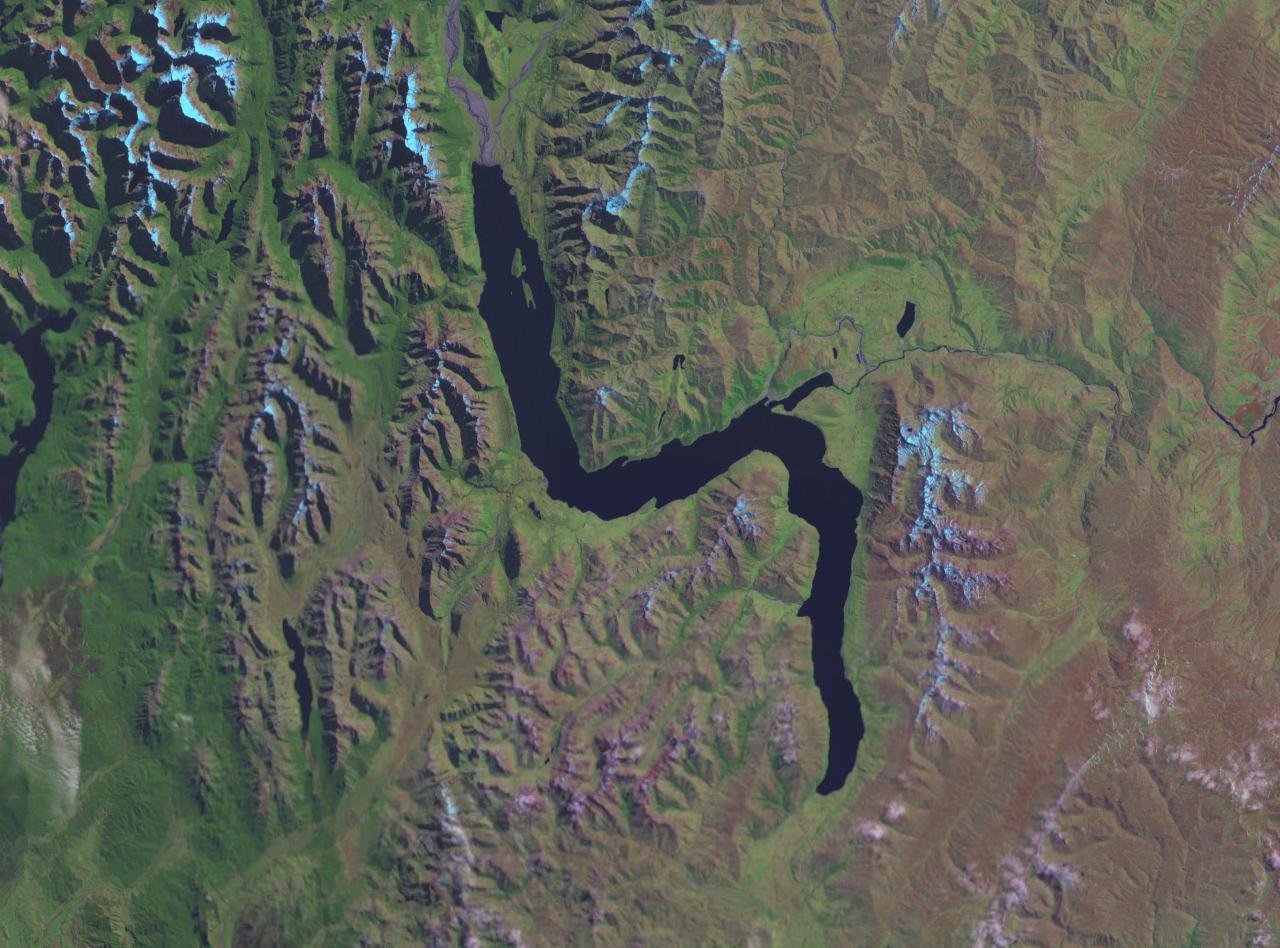
NASA false-colour satellite image

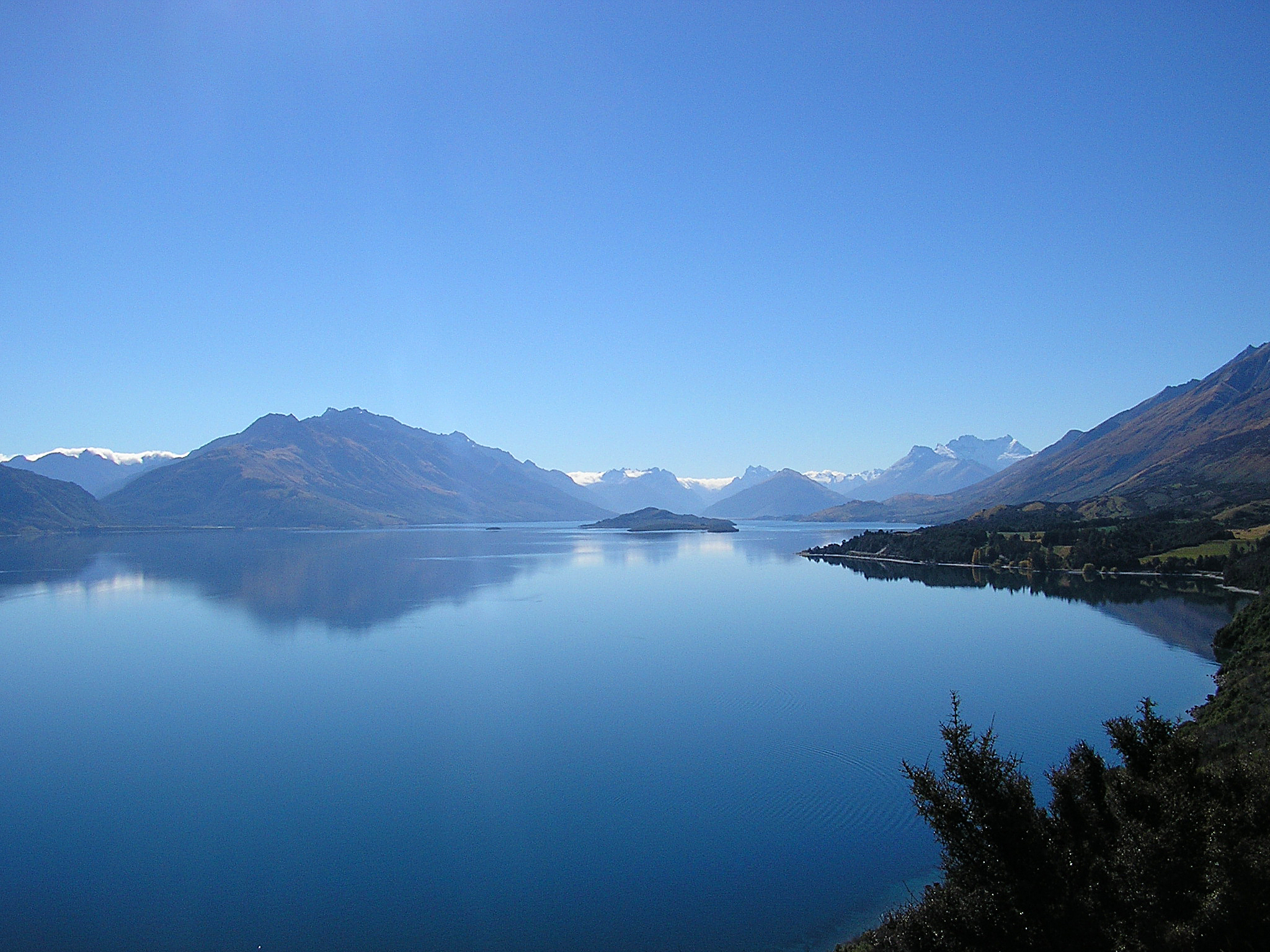
View of Lake Wakatipu from the Queenstown-Glenorchy Road

== Etymology ==
The name Wakatipu is either a contraction of Waka-tipua-wai-maori or derived from Whakatipu.

Waka-tipua-wai-maori means 'trough of fresh water where the giant lies' and comes from a legend that a giant created the lake when he died with the giant's inhalations and exhalations explaining the changing water levels. Whakatipu means 'to create' or 'to cause to grow'. The name is believed to come from a story about how the remainder of a Māori tribe sought refuge around the lake to rebuild their numbers.

Wakatipu could mean "growing bay" if the original was Whakatipu and the h elided as a result of the Southern Māori dialect. The dialect is also known for dropping final vowels. Waka can also mean 'hollow'.

Another proposed etymology is that the name is derived from the name of a Māori canoe (called a waka in the Māori language).

== History ==
Lake Wakatipu was first recorded on a map in 1843, it was not actually surveyed at the time and its position was based on details given by Māori; in September 1853 Nathaniel Chalmers became the first European to view the lake being guided to the lake by Reko, a chief of Tuturau. Chalmers had only viewed the lake from a distance and the first Europeans to reach the lake were a party of three men in January 1856, who were shown a crude map drawn in the ground by Reko. One of the three men accidentally started a large scrub fire when discarding a match beside the lake. More men made the rough trip to see the lake and this led to settlement of the Wakatipu District with the Staircase and Nokomai Stations being established in 1859.

William Gilbert Rees and Nicholas von Tunzelmann visited the lake in 1860 and were later granted run holdings surrounding the lake. In 1862 gold was found at Dunstan leading to the start of the Otago gold rush. Prospectors came to the lake in search of gold and an influx of people followed after news of gold being found by the lake had spread.

Soon gold was discovered on Rees' land, which lead to the creation of Queenstown.

== Flooding ==
Lake Wakatipu has experienced periodic flooding affecting the lakeside communities of Kingston, Glenorchy and Queenstown. Notable flooding events include the 1878 Queenstown floods, which affected a large part of the outlying Queenstown and Otago areas, the 1995 Queenstown floods, and most notably the 1999 Queenstown floods, which significantly damaged the Queenstown CBD and road infrastructure resulting in approximately $50 million worth of damage.

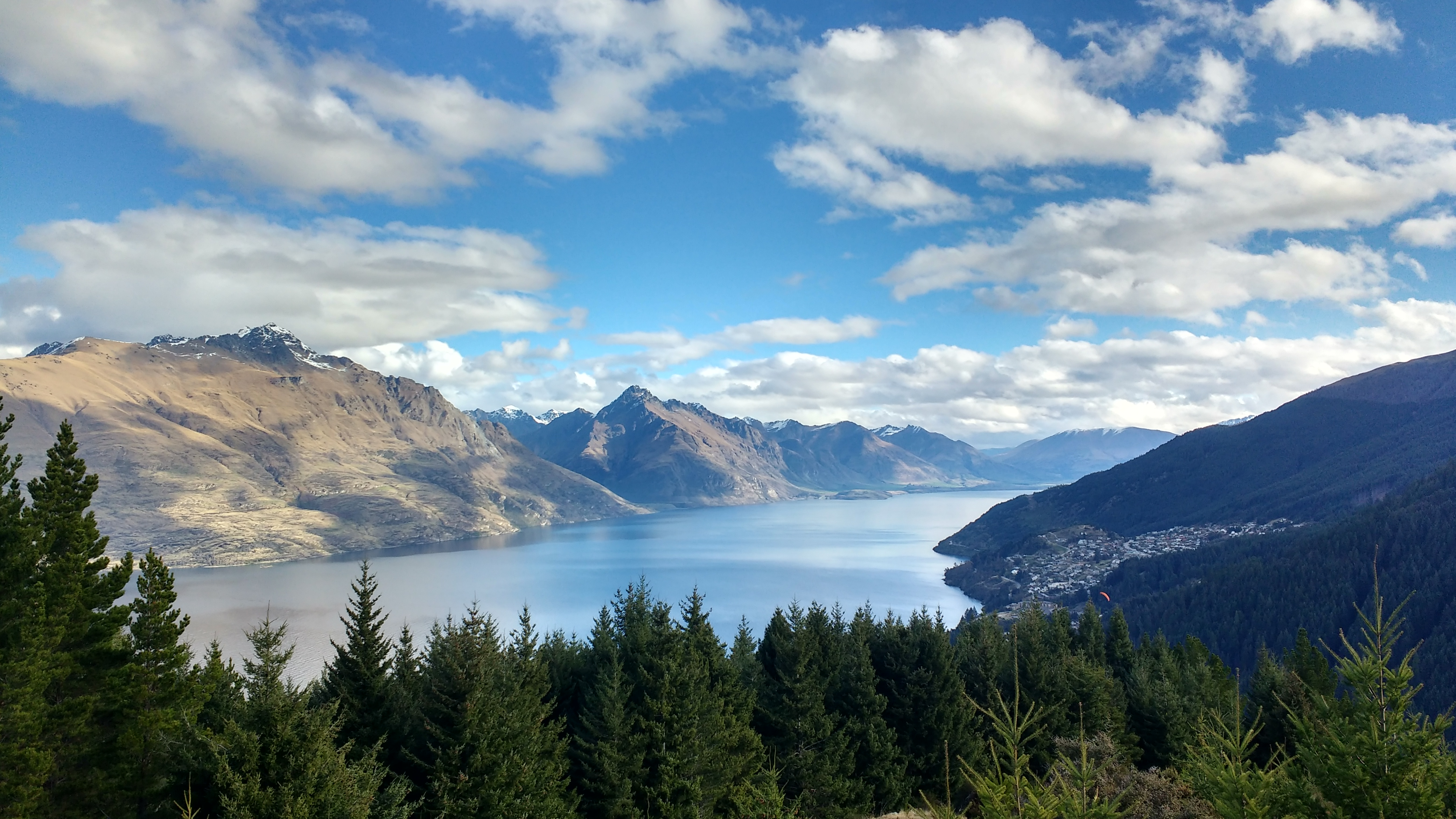
Lake Wakatipu from Queenstown Hill

== Wildlife ==
Lake Wakatipu is a habitat for the longfin eel (a specimen caught in 1886 is the largest known of this species), and for introduced brown trout, salmon and rainbow trout. These and other fish support predators such as the pied shag. The black-billed gull is often found around the lake while the most common birds are the black-billed gull and the introduced mallard. A smaller bird often not noticed because of its size is the New Zealand scaup.

== In popular culture ==
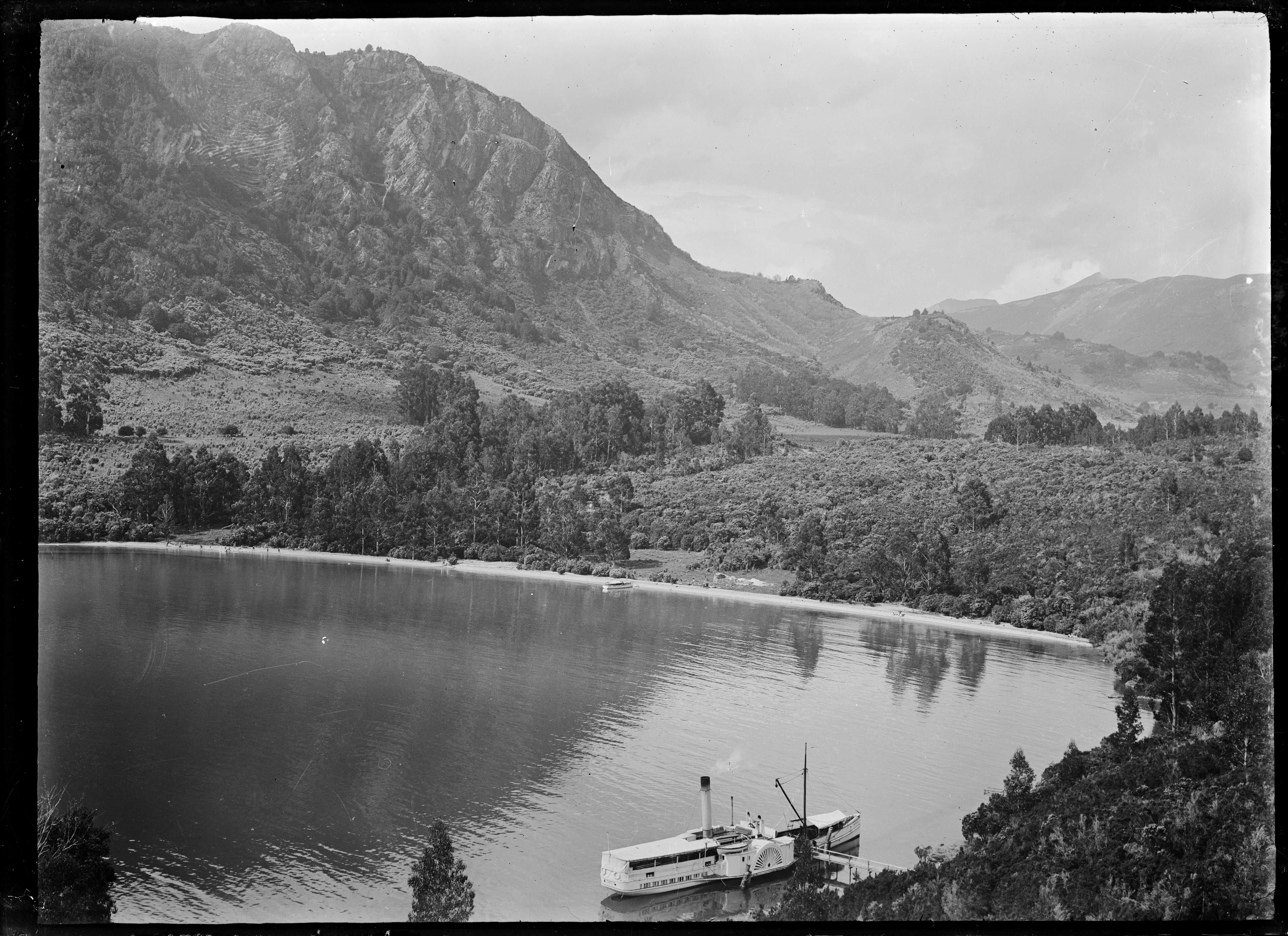
Paddle steamer Mountaineer at Bob's Cove jetty on Lake Wakatipu

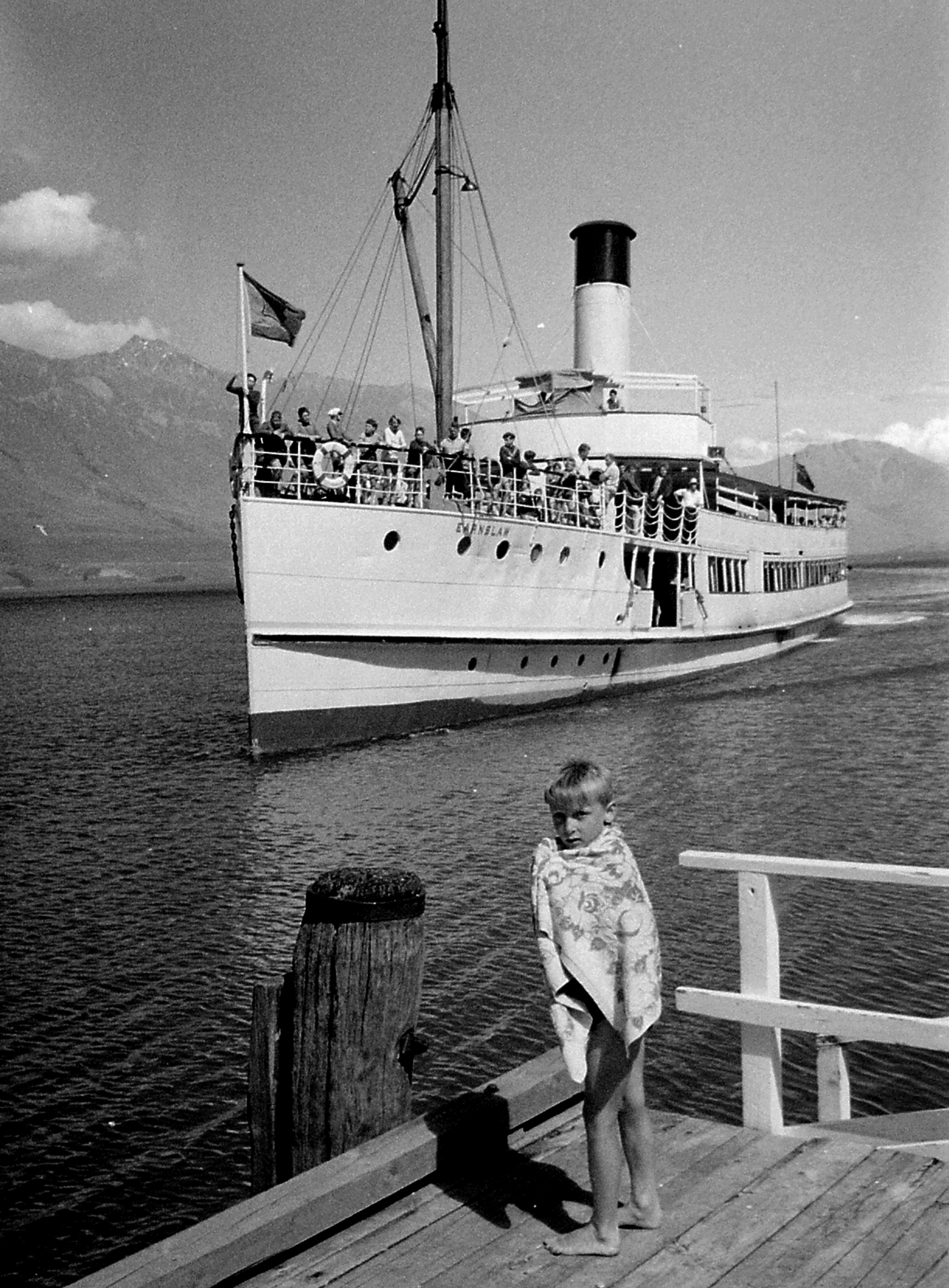
The Earnslaw approaching the wharf at Kinloch in 1967

=== Film ===
Lake Wakatipu doubled as the Scottish Loch Ness in the 2007 film The Water Horse: Legend of the Deep.

The lake was a backdrop for several scenes in The Lord of the Rings: The Fellowship of the Ring, including Amon Hen.

=== Television ===
Lake Wakatipu is the titular lake in the murder mystery television series Top of the Lake (2013).

== Sports ==
=== Swimming ===
The first person to swim the length of the lake was Ben Campbell-Macdonald in 2012. The 81 km solo wetsuit swim from Kingston on the lake's southern point to Glenorchy took 18.5 hours.

== See also ==
- List of lakes in New Zealand
