= Peter Townsend (cricketer) =

English cricketer and clergyman

Personal information
- Full name: Peter Norton Townsend
- Born: 15 February 1910; Norton, County Durham, England
- Died: 9 May 1995 (aged 85); Bromley, Kent, England
- Batting: Right-handed
- Bowling: Leg break
- Relatives: Charlie Townsend (father); David Townsend (brother); Frank Townsend (grandfather); Jonathan Townsend (nephew); Frank Townsend (uncle); Miles Townsend (uncle)

Domestic team information
- Years: Team
- 1929: Oxford University

Career statistics
Competition	First-class
Matches	2
Runs scored	16
Batting average	5.33
100s/50s	0/0
Top score	12
Balls bowled	192
Wickets	3
Bowling average	50.66
5 wickets in innings	0
10 wickets in match	0
Best bowling	2/18
Catches/stumpings	1/–
- Source: Cricinfo, 4 April 2020

Peter Norton Townsend (15 February 1910 – 9 May 1995) was an English first-class cricketer.

The son of the cricketer Charlie Townsend, he was born in February 1910 at Norton, County Durham. He was educated at Winchester College, before going up to New College, Oxford. While studying at Oxford, he played first-class cricket for Oxford University in 1929, making two appearances against the touring South Africans and Nottinghamshire. He scored 16 runs in his two matches, while with his leg break bowling he took 3 wickets. After graduating from Oxford, he became a solicitor. Townsend died at Bromley in May 1995. Coming from a large cricketing family, several relatives played cricket at first-class level, with his father and brother, David, playing Test cricket for England.
