= Frank Townsend =

Frank Townsend may refer to:

- Frank Townsend (cricketer, born 1847), cricketer born 1847
- Frank Townsend (cricketer, born 1875), cricketer born 1875
- Frank Townsend (rugby league) (1925–1946), English rugby league footballer who played in the 1940s
- Frank Townsend (wrestler) (1933–1965), American professional wrestler
