= Greatham, County Durham =

Village and civil parish in Hartlepool, County Durham, England

Coordinates: 54.641°N 1.238°W

Greatham /ˈɡriːtəm/ is a village and civil parish in the borough of Hartlepool, County Durham, England. The population of the civil parish (including Newton Bewley) was taken in the 2011 census was 2,132. Greatham village is located approximately three miles south of Hartlepool town centre.

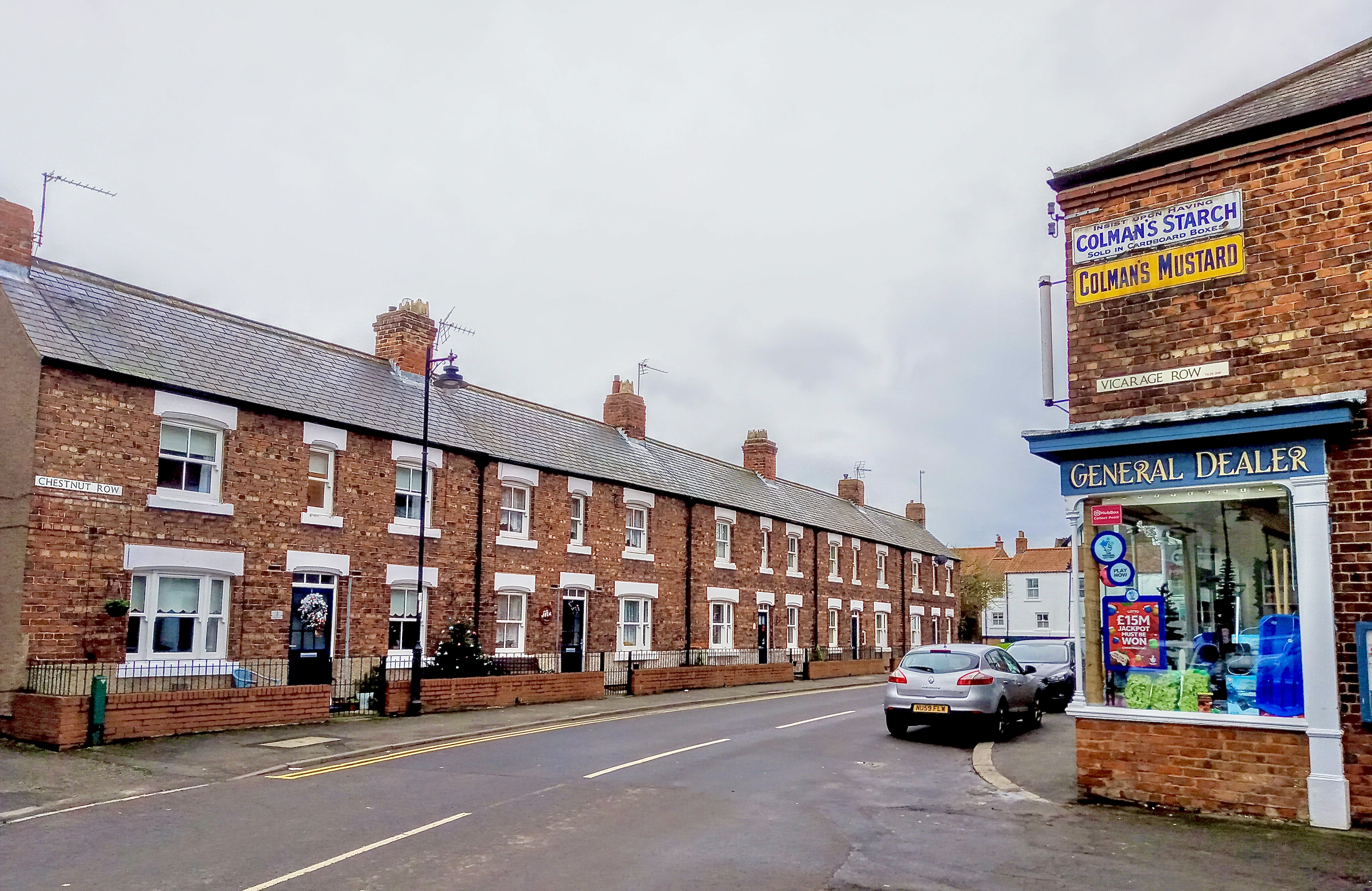
Greatham village near Hartlepool, County Durham.

== History ==
As it is situated within the former County Palatine of Durham Greatham village is not mentioned in the Domesday Book of 1086. It appears first in written sources as Gretham in 1196.

Greatham is the site of the Hospital of God, founded in 1273 by the then Bishop of Durham, Robert de Stichell. Greatham Hospital was originally a foundation to aid poor people. By the 16th century the foundation was used more as a "house of entertainment for gentlemen" and it was not well used for helping the poor. After 1610 there were reforms, and its original mission was resumed.

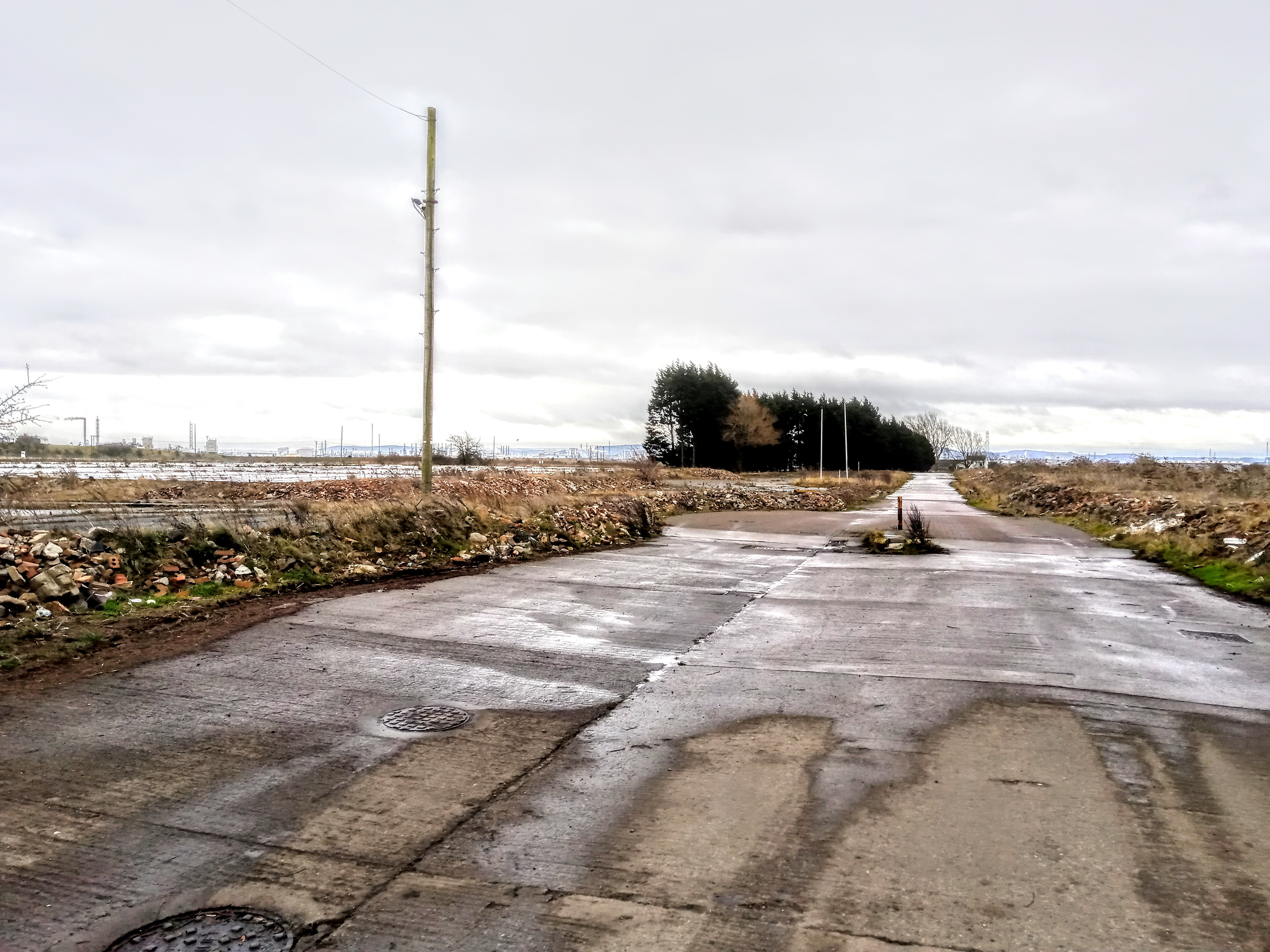
The site of the demolished Cerebos salt works at Greatham, County Durham during 2019.

During World War II it was the site of the short-lived RAF Greatham base.

In May 2021, the parish council of Greatham, alongside the parish councils of the villages of Elwick, Hart, and Dalton Piercy, all issued individual votes of no confidence in Hartlepool Borough Council, and expressed their desire to re-join County Durham.

== Landmarks ==
At present the village has around a thousand occupants, separated into varying areas, Saltaire Terrace, Hillview, The Grove, The Drive, The Green, Front Street and Ashfield Close, with some village residents living in the houses located at the extremes of the village parish. A new estate is currently being built near Hill View, next door to the school and will be known as Station Manor.

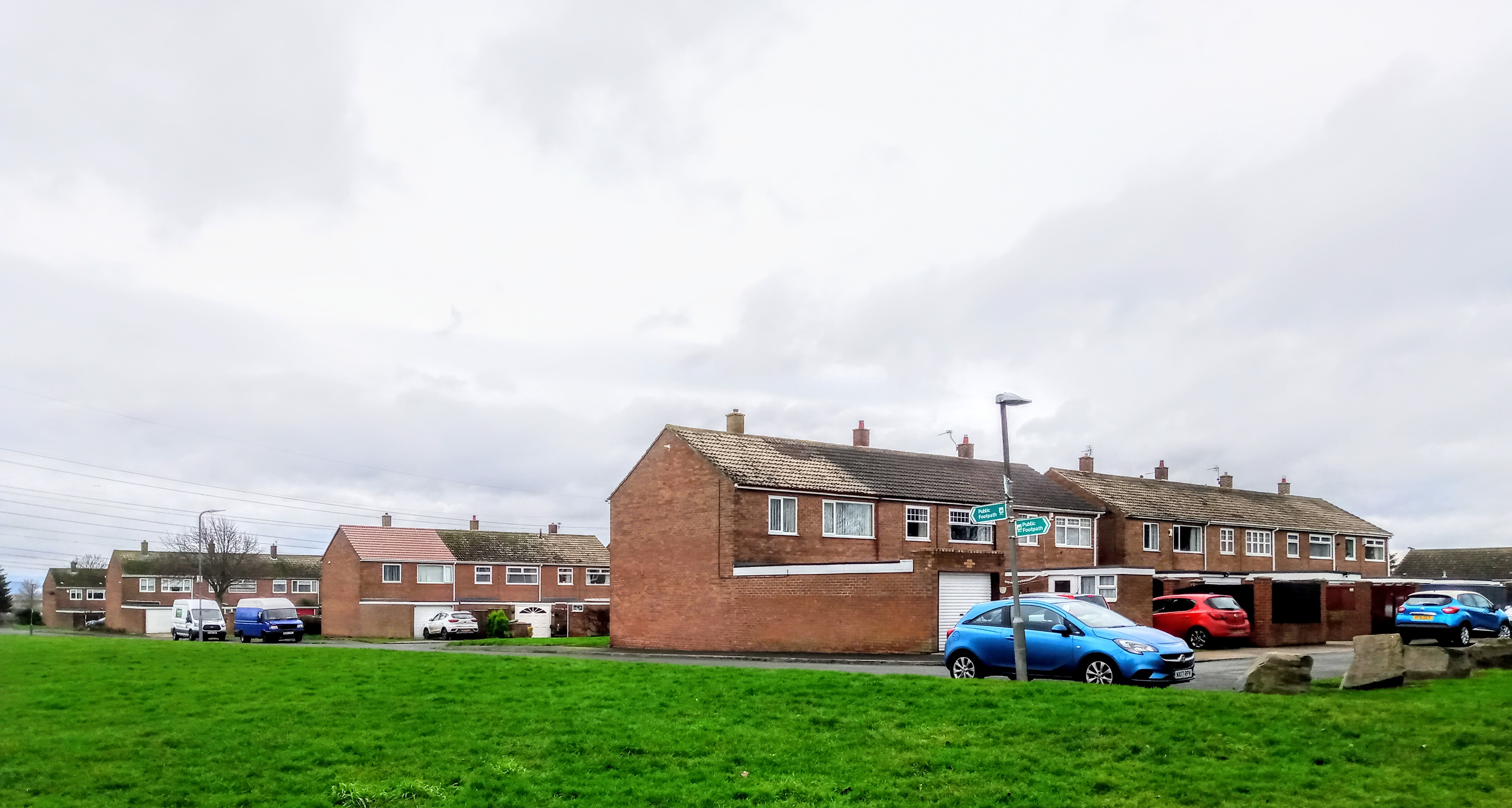
Modern housing in Greatham village near Hartlepool.

There is a long history of salt works nearby, but this declined in the 18th and 19th centuries. In the middle of the 20th century, Cerebos salt works had a factory there, which was later taken over by Sharwood's. The factory has now closed and has been demolished. The site now consists of large areas of hardstanding and rubble.

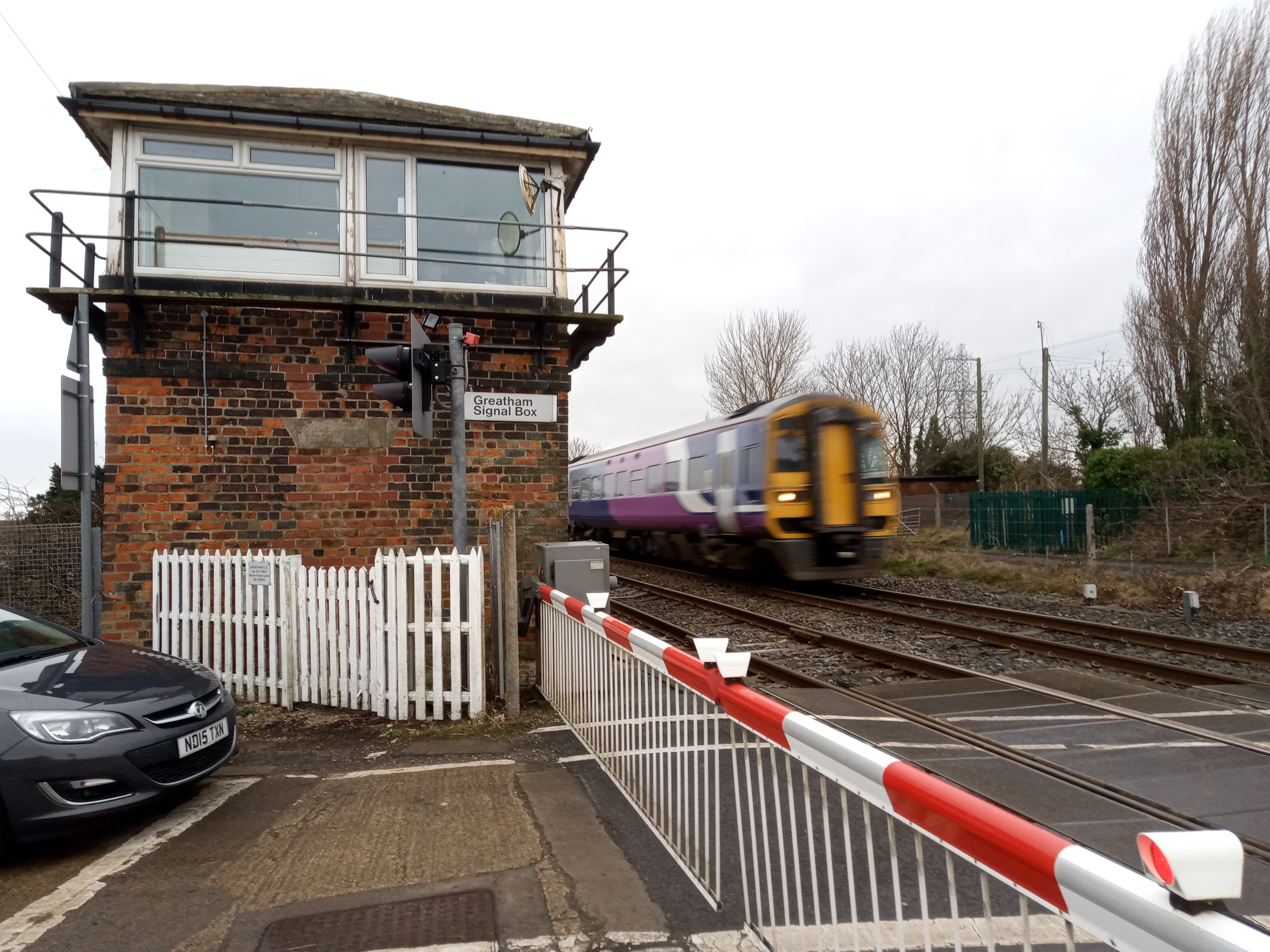
The signal box at Greatham, County Durham.

Greatham railway station was positioned near the old Cerebos factory, away from the majority of the village. It survived the Beeching cuts but was later downgraded to a halt before eventually closing on 24 November 1991 due to lack of use. The station was part of the Durham Coast Line.

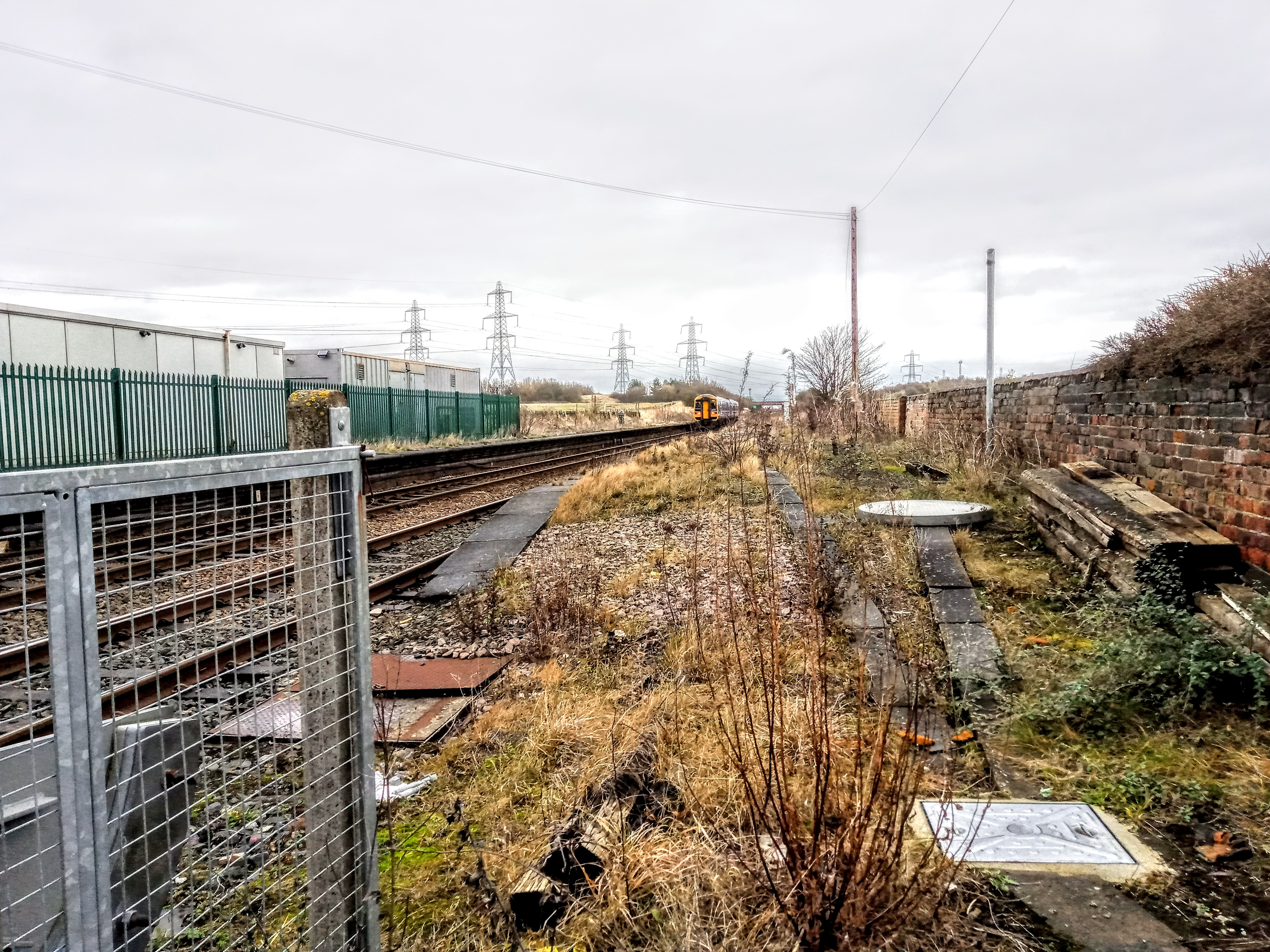
The remains of Greatham Station at Greatham, County Durham in 2019.

== Amenities ==
Greatham is a separate village from Hartlepool, with two pubs and a village green. Other amenities include:

- Hadj's Village Store
- Pigeon Post Emporium (Crafts shop)
- Greatham Sports field, a large field with various sports facilities including tennis courts and a small adventure playground.

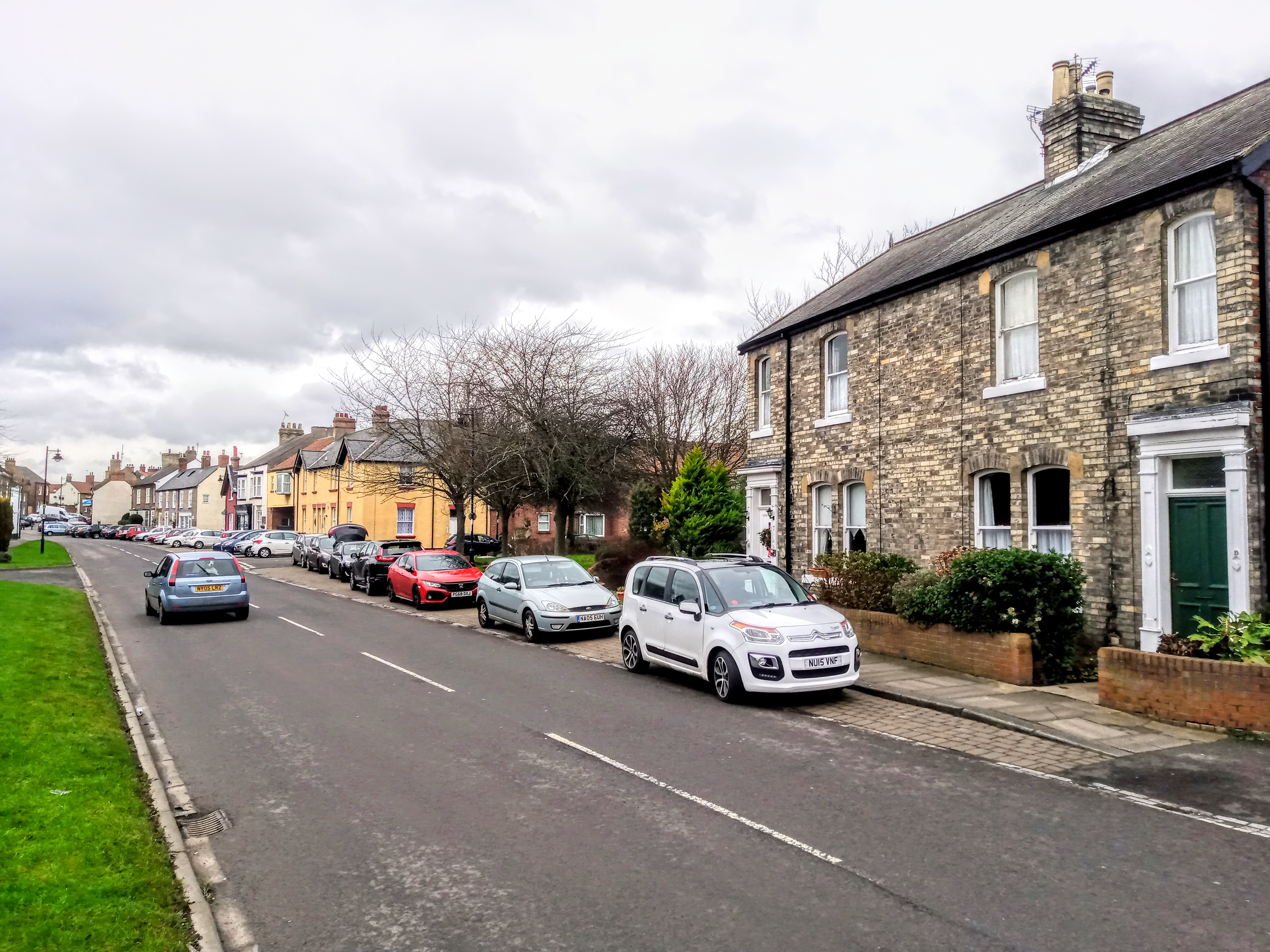
Greatham village, Hartlepool, County Durham 2019.

Greatham also has a small Church of England primary school. The school is open to children of all faiths. It is well equipped, with four classrooms, a large multi-purpose school hall with gym equipment, a kitchen and a dedicated nursery area. The school grounds include a nature garden, which is looked after by the pupils, a formal garden and a large playing field.

The Church, dedicated to St. John the Baptist, was erected over the foundations of an early Saxon building, by Bishop Stichell of Durham, in 1270. It was rebuilt in 1792, a clerestory added by the Rev. H. B. Tristram in 1869, and a new vestry and organ, at a cost of £650, by the present vicar in 1881. It consists of nave, aisles, chancel, and a square western tower of modest dimensions. The exterior of the church is neat and attractive; the recent additions, especially the clerestory, which is lighted by elegant quatrefoils, have been well carried out, and add much to the general appearance of the structure.

[From History, Topography and Directory of Durham, Whellan, London, 1894]

== Transport ==
A bus service is operated by Stagecoach. The number 36 bus route comes every 15 minutes, heading towards Middlesbrough via Stockton, Billingham and Norton and to Hartlepool via the Fens. There was also the 527 Service, operated by Arriva, which came every 60 minutes, and headed into Hartlepool, terminating at Maritime Avenue on the Marina. This service was axed in 2011 due to the withdrawal of financial support from Hartlepool Borough Council. A petition was signed by residents to encourage this decision to be re-evaluated but has not had the service reinstated.

There was once an operating railway station at the bottom of the village, but this is now disused and derelict. However the Middlesbrough to Carlisle trains still pass through the village.

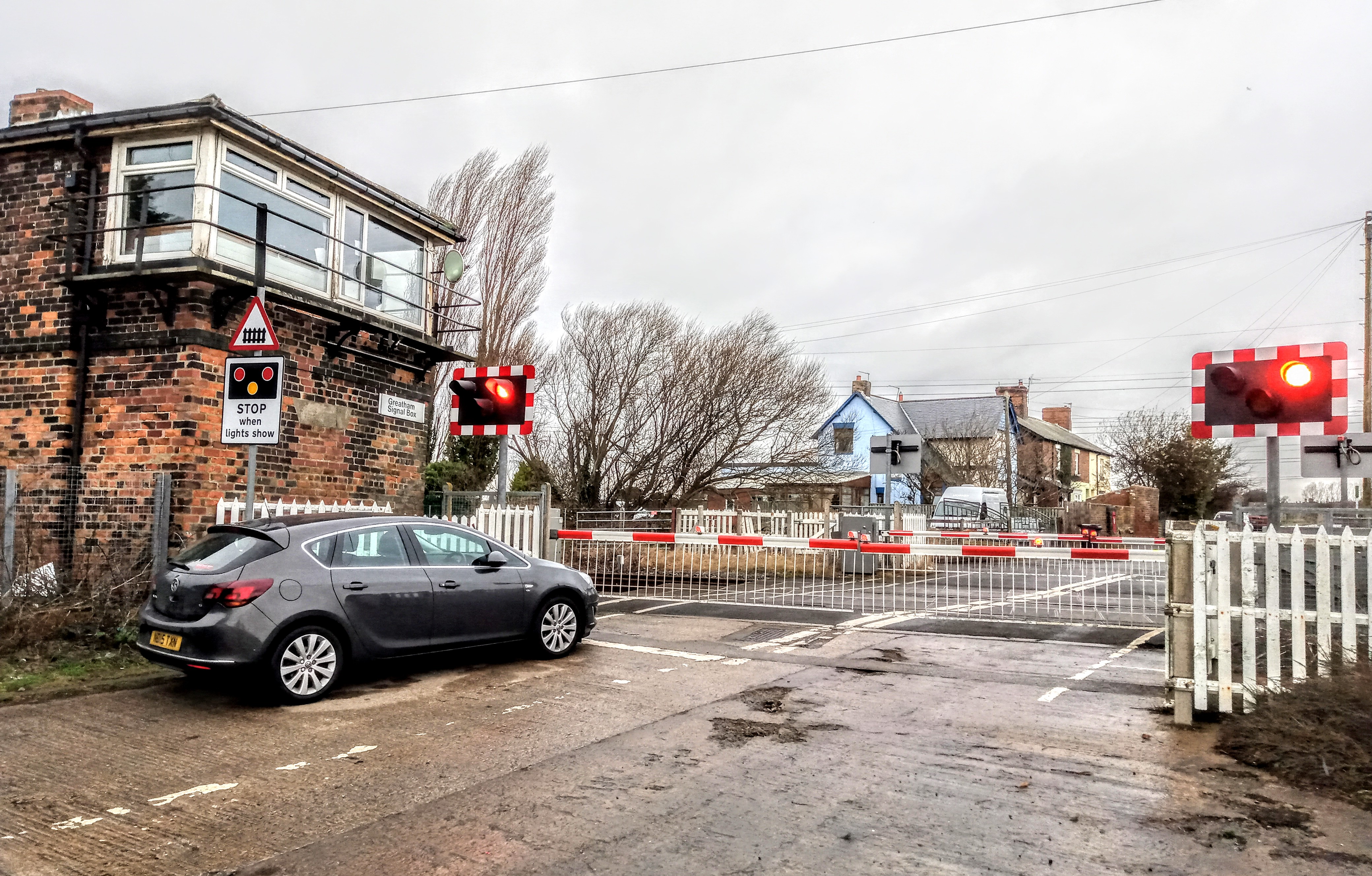
Greatham signal box, Greatham 2019.
