= Peter Townsend =

Peter Townsend may refer to:

- Peter Townsend (cricketer) (1910–1995), English cricket player
- Peter Townsend (golfer) (born 1946), British golf player
- Peter Townsend (RAF officer) (1914–1995), British military pilot linked to Princess Margaret
- Peter Townsend (sociologist) (1928–2009), British academic
- Peter Townsend (journalist) (1919–2006), Art Monthly Australasia editor
- Peter Townsend, American owner of the Sterling Iron Works

== See also ==
- Pete Townshend (born 1945), British guitarist of The Who
- Peter Townsend Barlow (1857–1921), American jurist
- Peter Townend (disambiguation)
