= Deehan =

Deehan is a surname. Notable people with the surname include:

- Geoff Deehan (born 1952), British film and television producer
- John Deehan (born 1957), English footballer and manager
