= Billingham railway station =

Railway station in County Durham, England

Billingham
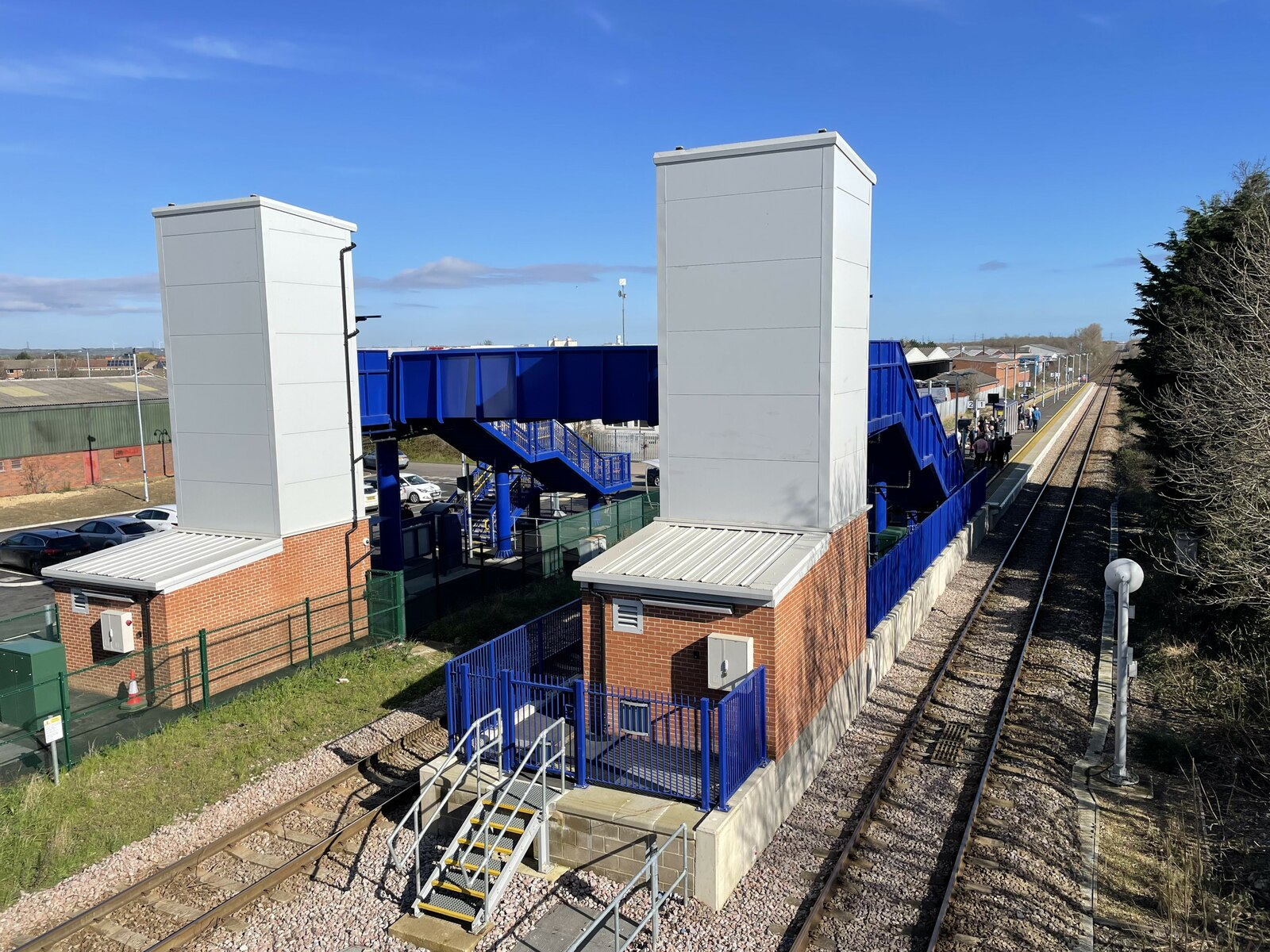

General information
- Location: Billingham, Borough of Stockton-on-Tees; England
- Coordinates: 54°36′21″N 1°16′46″W
- Grid reference: NZ466236
- Owner: Network Rail
- Manager: Northern Trains
- Platforms: 2
- Tracks: 2

Other information
- Station code: BIL
- Classification: DfT category F2

History
- Original company: Stockton and Hartlepool Railway
- Pre-grouping: North Eastern Railway
- Post-grouping: London and North Eastern Railway; British Rail (North Eastern Region)

Key dates
- 10 February 1841: Opened as Billingham
- 1 March 1870: Renamed Billingham Junction
- 1 May 1893: Renamed Billingham
- 1 October 1926: Renamed Billingham-on-Tees
- 7 November 1966: Resited and renamed Billingham

Passengers
- 2020/21: ▼23,126
- 2021/22: ▲75,062
- 2022/23: ▲77,234
- 2023/24: ▲98,006
- 2024/25: ▲0.118 million
Location
- Location within County Durham
Notes
- Passenger statistics from the Office of Rail and Road

Billingham is a railway station on the Durham Coast Line, which runs between Newcastle and Middlesbrough via Hartlepool. The station, situated 10 miles 8 chains (16.3 km) north-west of Middlesbrough, serves the town of Billingham, Borough of Stockton-on-Tees in County Durham, England. It is owned by Network Rail and managed by Northern Trains.

== History ==
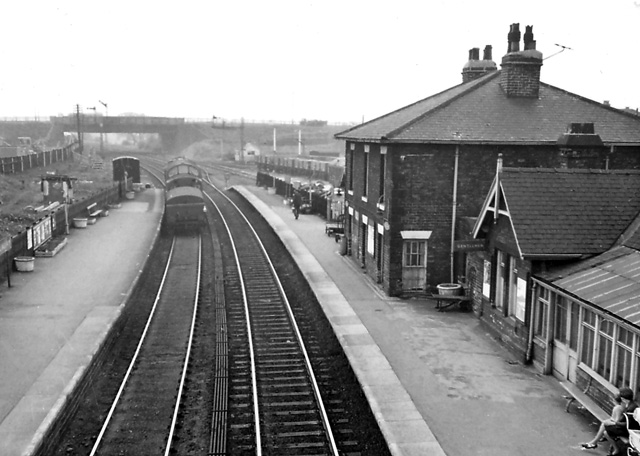
Looking south-west from the former station at Billingham, photographed in May 1965.

The station is a modern-style halt on the line and was opened on Monday 7 November 1966 to replace the town's original grander station located further west towards Norton; this closed the previous day and was subsequently demolished in the early 1970s. It was located to the west of the junction between the Durham Coast Line and the earlier Port Clarence Branch of the Clarence Railway, adjacent to the level crossing carrying the old route of the A19 across the railway. The signal box and footbridge were demolished between 2018 and 2023.

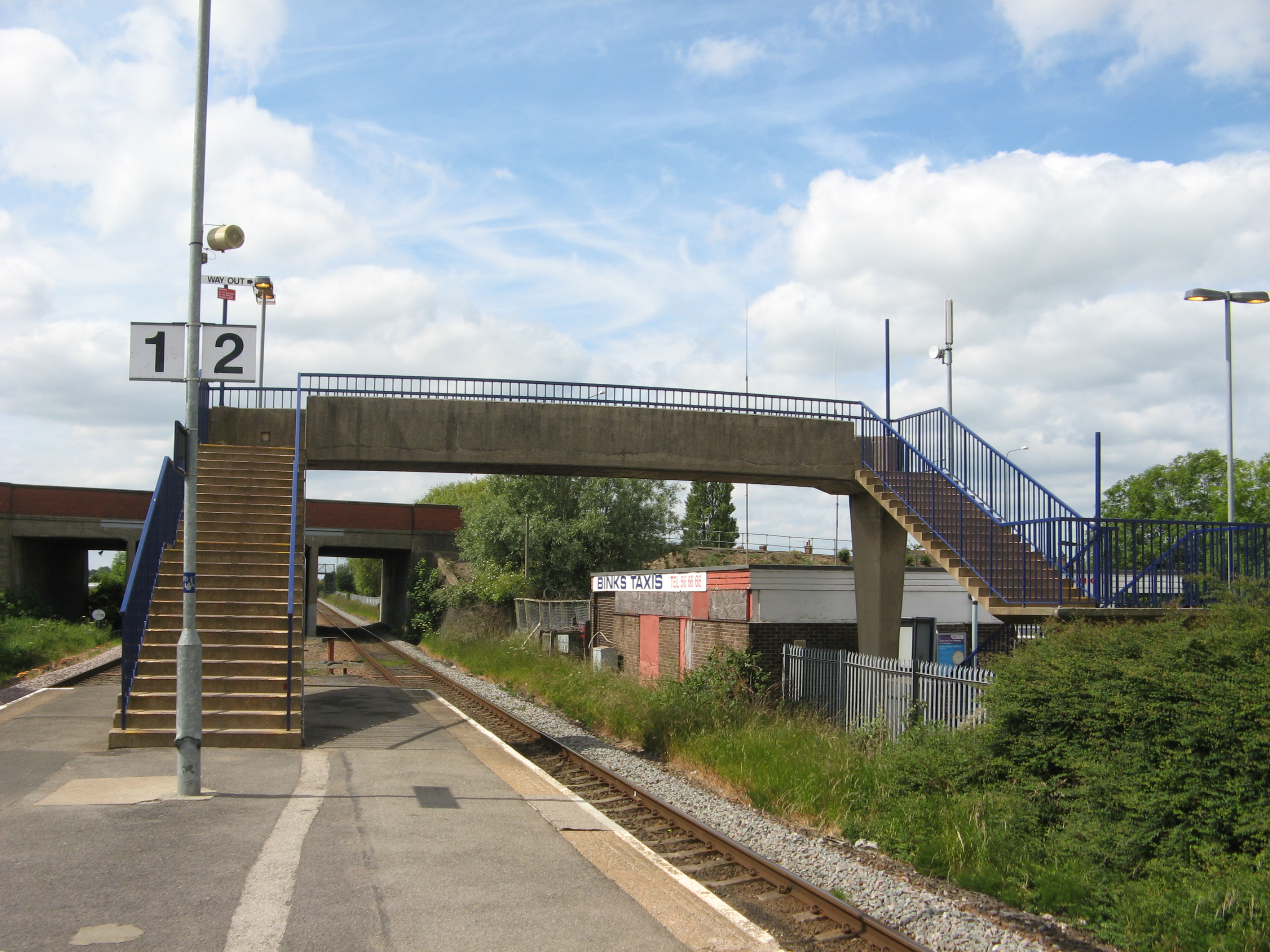
The station in 2011

The new Billingham station, built by the Eastern Region of British Rail, was provided with a booking hall, waiting room, parcels office and lavatories. These facilities were lost when the station was reduced to unstaffed halt status towards the end of the 1960s. The station building of 1966 was demolished in 2023 to make way for the construction of a new footbridge and lifts.

The Tees Valley Rail Strategy calls for the re-opening of the original station as 'Old Billingham' as a new additional station on the Durham Coast Line. However, the plans have yet to come to fruition.

=== Tees Valley Metro ===
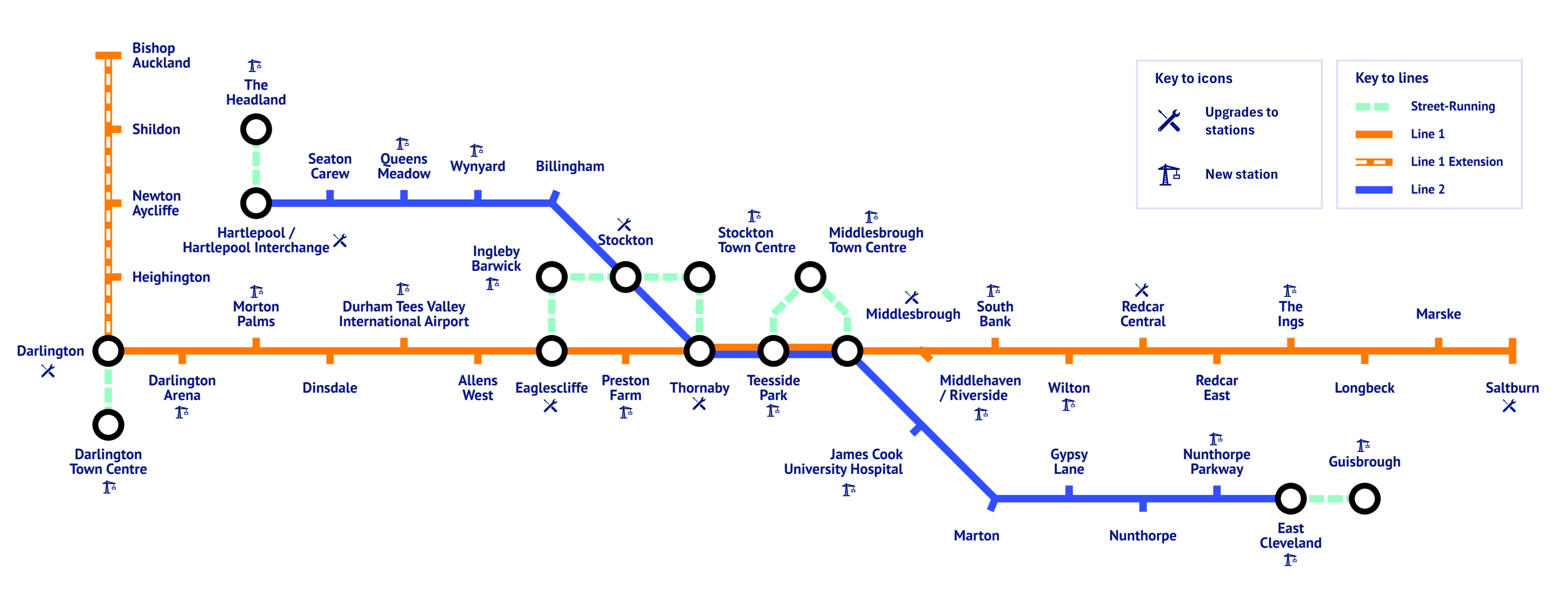
Transit diagram showcasing all discussed or mentioned ideas for the Tees Valley Metro.

Starting in 2006, Billingham was mentioned within the Tees Valley Metro scheme. This was a plan to upgrade the Tees Valley Line and sections of the Esk Valley Line and Durham Coast Line to provide a faster and more frequent service across the North East of England. In the initial phases the services would have been heavy rail mostly along existing alignments with new additional infrastructure and rollingstock. The later phase would have introduced tram-trains to allow street running and further heavy rail extensions.

As part of the scheme, Billingham station would have received improved service to Nunthorpe and Hartlepool, possibly a street-running link to Guisborough and the Headland, as well as new rollingstock.

However, due to a change in government in 2010 and the 2008 financial crisis, the project was ultimately shelved. Several stations eventually got their improvements and there is a possibility of improved rollingstock and services in the future which may affect Billingham.

== Accidents and incidents ==
- On 2 December 1953, a train, hauled by Ex-WD Austerity 2-8-0 No. 90048, ran off the end of the loop and was derailed. An express freight train, hauled by Ex-LNER Class V2 2-6-2 No. 60891, then ran into the wreckage, and was also derailed.

== Facilities ==
The station is unstaffed but has a ticket machine. A lit, unenclosed waiting shelter, digital information screens and CCTV cameras were installed in 2023, along with improvements to the long-line public address (PA) system for service announcements. Train running information can also be obtained by telephone, a customer help point and timetable poster boards. Access to the island platform is via a stepped footbridge and lifts.

== Services ==
As of the winter 2023 timetable change, the station is served by an hourly service between Newcastle and Middlesbrough. Most trains continue to Hexham (or Carlisle on Sunday) and Nunthorpe beyond Middlesbrough. Two trains per day (three on Sunday) continue to Whitby. Two direct trains operate between Hartlepool and Darlington on Sundays. All services are operated by Northern Trains.

Rolling stock used: Class 156 Super Sprinter and Class 158 Express Sprinter

Preceding station	National Rail	Following station
Stockton	Northern Trains; Durham Coast Line	Seaton Carew
	Historical railways	
Stockton-on-Tees; Line and station open	British Rail (Eastern Region); Durham Coast Line	Greatham; Line open; station closed
Norton-on-Tees; Line open; station closed	London and North Eastern Railway; Durham Coast Line	Greatham; Line open; station closed
Norton-on-Tees; Line open; station closed	London and North Eastern Railway; Clarence Railway (Port Clarence Branch)	Belasis Lane; Line open; station closed
