= RAF Greatham =

RAF Greatham
- Near Greatham, County Durham in England

Site information
- Type: Royal Air Force satellite station
- Owner: Air Ministry
- Operator: Royal Air Force
- Controlled by: RAF Flying Training Command

Location
- Shown within County Durham RAF Greatham (the United Kingdom)
- Coordinates: 54°38′58″N 001°12′46″W

Site history
- Built: 1933
- In use: 1933 - 1958
- Battles/wars: European theatre of World War II

Airfield information
Runways
Direction	Length and surface
00/00	Grass
00/00	Grass

Royal Air Force Greatham or more simply RAF Greatham is a former Royal Air Force satellite station located in Greatham, County Durham, England.

It was also known as RAF West Hartlepool and was located at Hartlepool and was little more than a grass airstrip, a satellite station of RAF Thornaby.

== History ==
It was home to four Supermarine Spitfires of No. 403 Squadron RCAF from 19 June 1942 to 22 January 1943; operating forward from RAF Catterick.

The airfield was once home to No. 645 Volunteer Gliding School, who operate Grob Vigilant Motor Gliders for the Air Training Corps. They are now located at RAF Topcliffe in Yorkshire.

The following units were also here at some point:

- 'N' Flight of No. 1 Anti-Aircraft Co-operation Unit RAF
- Satellite for No. 6 (Coastal) OTU RAF from 8 September 1941
- No. 26 Gliding School RAF
- No. 32 Elementary and Reserve Flying Training School RAF
- No. 243 Squadron RAF
- No. 1613 (Anti-Aircraft Co-operation) Flight RAF
- No. 2782 Squadron RAF Regiment
- No. 4054 Anti-Aircraft Flight RAF Regiment

== Current use ==
Little now remains, as the site was developed after the war by British Steel Corporation.

== See also ==
- List of former Royal Air Force stations
