= Belasis Lane railway station =

Disused railway station in Billingham, Stockton-on-Tees

Belasis Lane
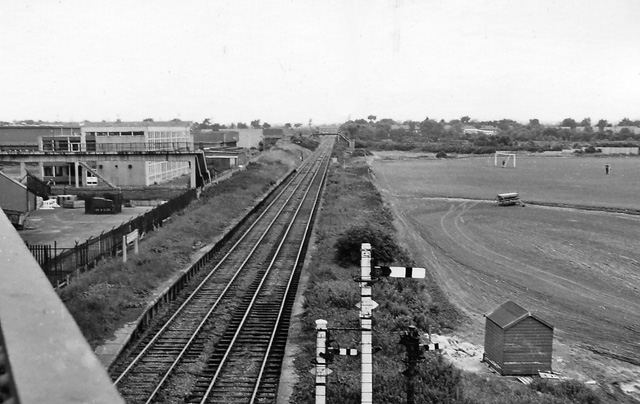
- The remains of the station in 1970

General information
- Location: Billingham, Stockton-on-Tees; England
- Coordinates: 54.6°N 1.274°W
- Grid reference: NZ470230
- Platforms: 2

Other information
- Status: Disused

History
- Original company: London and North Eastern Railway
- Post-grouping: London and North Eastern Railway; British Rail (North Eastern)

Key dates
- May 1928: Opened
- 14 June 1954: Closed to regular passenger services
- 6 November 1961: Closed to all passengers
- 2 November 1964: Closed completely
Location

Belasis Lane railway station served the ICI Billingham Manufacturing Plant in the town of Billingham, County Durham, England from 1928 to 1964 on the Port Clarence branch of the former Clarence Railway which had become part of the London and North Eastern Railway by the time the station opened.

== History ==
The station was opened in May 1928 by the London and North Eastern Railway (LNER) on its branch to Port Clarence which had been opened by the Clarence Railway (a predecessor of the LNER) in 1833. It was situated a short distance to the east of the junction between the former Clarence Railway and the former Stockton and Hartlepool Railway (now part of the Durham Coast Line).

Regular passenger services on the Port Clarence branch (which had only run as far as Haverton Hill since 1939) were withdrawn completely on 14 June 1954 but due to its location being close to the ICI plant, Belasis Lane station remained open to the services for workmen until 6 November 1961 and goods traffic until 2 November 1964. The line through the station remains open to freight traffic and provides access to the oil terminal and storage facilities at Seal Sands.

Preceding station	Disused railways	Following station
Billingham-on-Tees; Line open; station closed	London and North Eastern Railway: Clarence Railway; (Port Clarence Branch)	Haverton Hill; Line open; station closed
