= Miles Townsend =

English cricketer

Arthur Fenton Miles Townsend (1 August 1885 – 24 August 1948) was an English cricketer for Essex and Gloucestershire County Cricket Clubs between 1903 and 1910. A right-hand batsman and occasional underarm bowler, Townsend player 10 first class cricket matches, scoring 200 runs and taking three wickets.

Born near Bristol, Somerset, he died in Kensington, London. His family was strongly linked to cricket, with nephew David playing Test cricket for England while his father, brother, and two great-nephews all made first class or List-A appearances.
