= Greatham railway station =

Disused railway station in County Durham, England

Greatham
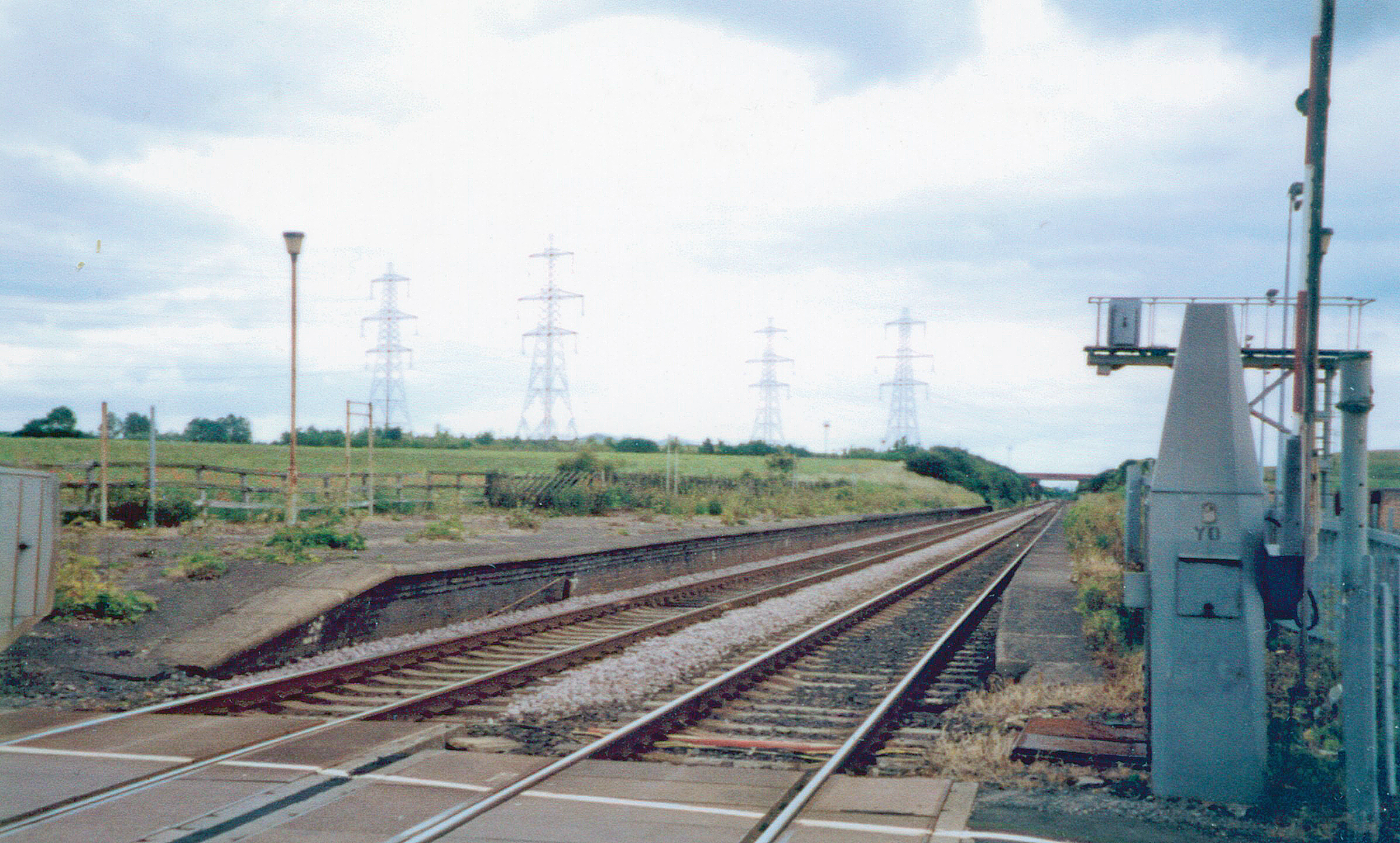
- The remains of the station in 2002

General information
- Location: Greatham, Hartlepool; England
- Coordinates: 54.6342°N 1.2289°W
- Grid reference: NZ498268
- Platforms: 2

Other information
- Status: Disused

History
- Original company: Stockton and Hartlepool Railway
- Pre-grouping: North Eastern Railway
- Post-grouping: London and North Eastern Railway; British Railways (North Eastern Region); British Rail (Eastern Region)

Key dates
- 10 February 1841: Opened
- 24 November 1991: Closed
Location

Greatham railway station served the village of Greatham in the Borough of Hartlepool, North East England, from 1841 to 1991 on what became the Durham Coast Line.

== History ==
The station was opened on 10 February 1841 as a stop on the Stockton and Hartlepool Railway, originally a branch line linking West Hartlepool to main line of the Clarence Railway near Billingham. Under the direction of the North Eastern Railway, a successor to the S&HR, a new line was constructed at Hartlepool in 1877 to provide a direct connection to the former Hartlepool Dock and Railway network operating northwards from the town, thus allowing through running towards Sunderland and beginning the process of integrating the S&HR into what would become the Durham Coast Line.

The station survived the Beeching cuts but was later downgraded to an unstaffed halt. It was ultimately closed to all traffic on 24 November 1991, after having its service reduced to minimal levels for much of the previous decade.

The disused station platforms remain at the site, but all the station buildings have been demolished except the signal box. It has been decommissioned and was due to be demolished in October 2020, but was still standing in January 2025.

Preceding station	Historical railways	Following station
Billingham-on-Tees; Line open; station closed	North Eastern Railway; Durham Coast Line	Seaton Carew; Line and station open
Billingham; Line and station open	British Rail (Eastern Region); Durham Coast Line	Seaton Carew; Line and station open
