= David Townsend (cricketer, born 1912) =

English cricketer

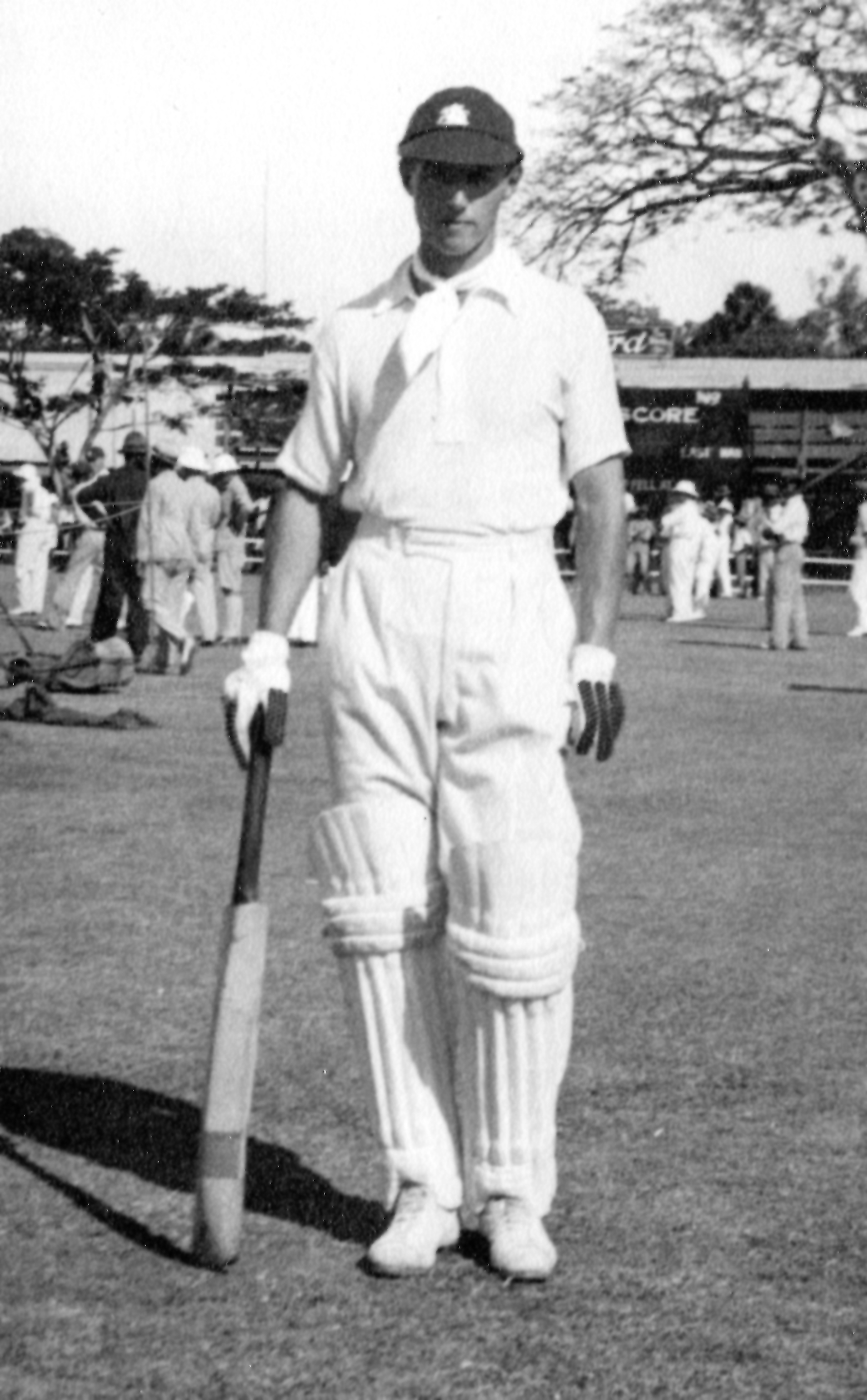

Personal information
- Full name: David Charles Humphery Townsend
- Born: 20 April 1912; Norton, County Durham, England
- Died: 27 January 1997 (aged 84); Norton, County Durham, England
- Batting: Right-handed
- Bowling: Right-arm medium
- Role: Batsman
- Relatives: Charlie Townsend (father); Peter Townsend (brother); Jonathan Townsend (son)

International information
- National side: England (1935)
- Test debut (cap 282): 24 January 1935 v West Indies
- Last Test: 14 March 1935 v West Indies

Domestic team information
- Years: Team
- 1933–1934: Oxford University
- 1935–1950: Durham

Career statistics
Competition	Test	First-class
Matches	3	37
Runs scored	77	1,801
Batting average	12.83	29.04
100s/50s	0/0	4/6
Top score	36	195
Balls bowled	6	1142
Wickets	0	6
Bowling average	–	83.50
5 wickets in innings	–	0
10 wickets in match	–	0
Best bowling	–	2/31
Catches/stumpings	1/–	16/–
- Source: Cricinfo, 3 September 2026

David Charles Humphrey Townsend (20 April 1912 – 27 January 1997) was an English cricketer who played in three Test matches in 1935.

Born in Norton, County Durham, Townsend was educated at Winchester College and New College, Oxford. He was a right-handed batsman, sometimes used as an opener, who holds the record of being the last cricketer to play Test cricket for England without playing for one of the first-class English counties. Townsend's first-class cricket was principally for Oxford University and he won his Blue in the University match in 1933 and 1934. His other cricket was mainly for Durham, which was at that time one of the Minor Counties.

After two good university seasons, Townsend was picked for a rather makeshift Marylebone Cricket Club (MCC) side that toured the West Indies in 1934–35 under Bob Wyatt. He opened in three of the four Tests but was not a success, and the series was won by the West Indian cricket team, the side's first series victory. Townsend played little first-class cricket after this tour, though his final match was not until 1948.

Townsend was the son of Charles Townsend, also an England Test player, and his own son, Jonathan, played first-class cricket for Oxford University in the 1960s. David Townsend died in January 1997, aged 84, in Norton, County Durham.
