= Seaton Carew railway station =

Railway station in County Durham, England

Seaton Carew
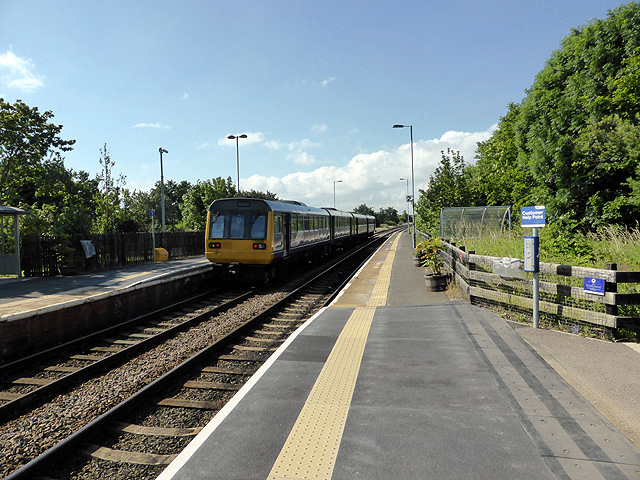

General information
- Location: Seaton Carew, Borough of Hartlepool; England
- Coordinates: 54°39′29″N 1°12′02″W
- Grid reference: NZ516295
- Owner: Network Rail
- Manager: Northern Trains
- Platforms: 2
- Tracks: 2

Other information
- Station code: SEC
- Classification: DfT category F2

History
- Original company: Stockton and Hartlepool Railway
- Pre-grouping: North Eastern Railway
- Post-grouping: London and North Eastern Railway; British Rail (North Eastern Region)

Key dates
- 10 February 1841: Opened as Seaton
- 1872: Renamed Seaton Carew

Passengers
- 2020/21: ▼19,300
- 2021/22: ▲61,076
- 2022/23: ▲65,054
- 2023/24: ▲75,728
- 2024/25: ▲98,362
Location
- Location within County Durham
Notes
- Passenger statistics from the Office of Rail and Road

Seaton Carew is a railway station on the Durham Coast Line, which runs between Newcastle and Middlesbrough via Hartlepool. The station, situated 14 miles 77 chains (24.1 km) north-east of Middlesbrough, serves the seaside village of Seaton Carew, Hartlepool in County Durham, England. It is owned by Network Rail and managed by Northern Trains.

== Facilities ==
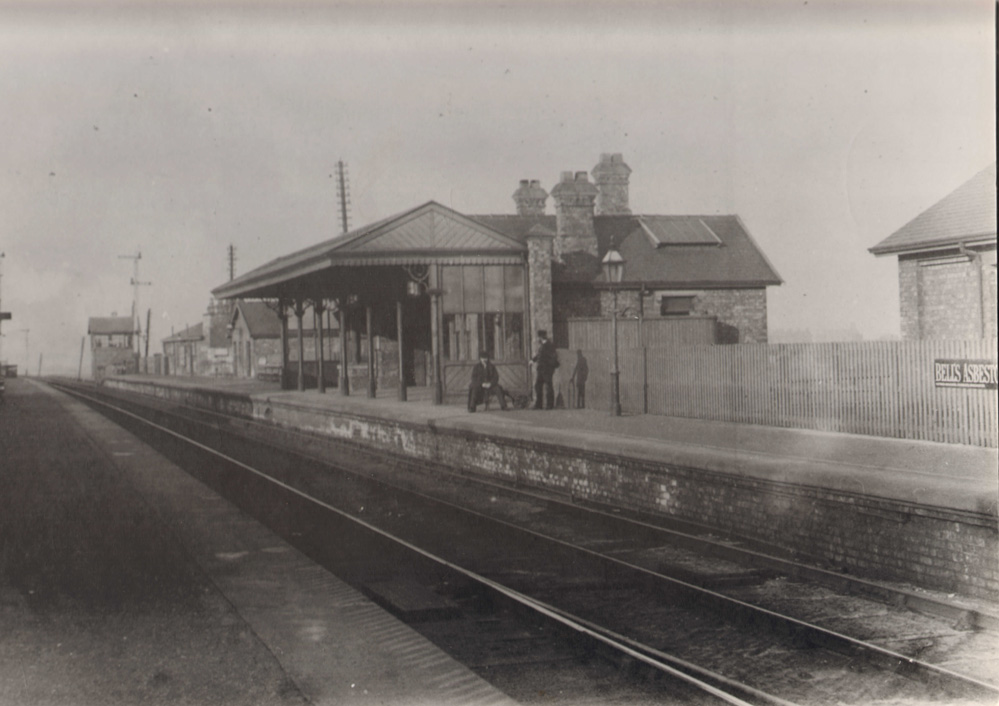
The earlier station buildings, constructed by the North Eastern Railway, seen around the turn of the twentieth century.

The station is unstaffed and has no permanent buildings (the old NER buildings on the southbound side were demolished back in the 1970s). As with other stations on this line, new fully lit waiting shelters, digital information screens and CCTV cameras have been installed (the former replacing the old brick structures), whilst the long-line Public Address system (PA) has been renewed and upgraded with pre-recorded train announcements (running information can also be obtained by telephone and timetable poster boards). Tickets can be bought on board the train (or prior to travel), or at the station at a digital ticket machine operated by Northern Rail. Two Harrington Humps have been installed at the station to raise platform heights at specific points on the platforms and so improve access to trains. Step-free access is also available to each platform via ramps from the nearby road.

In 2009 the station underwent maintenance work to re-develop the station and its looks. The station has already seen the cutting down of trees to allow more natural light.

=== Tees Valley Metro ===
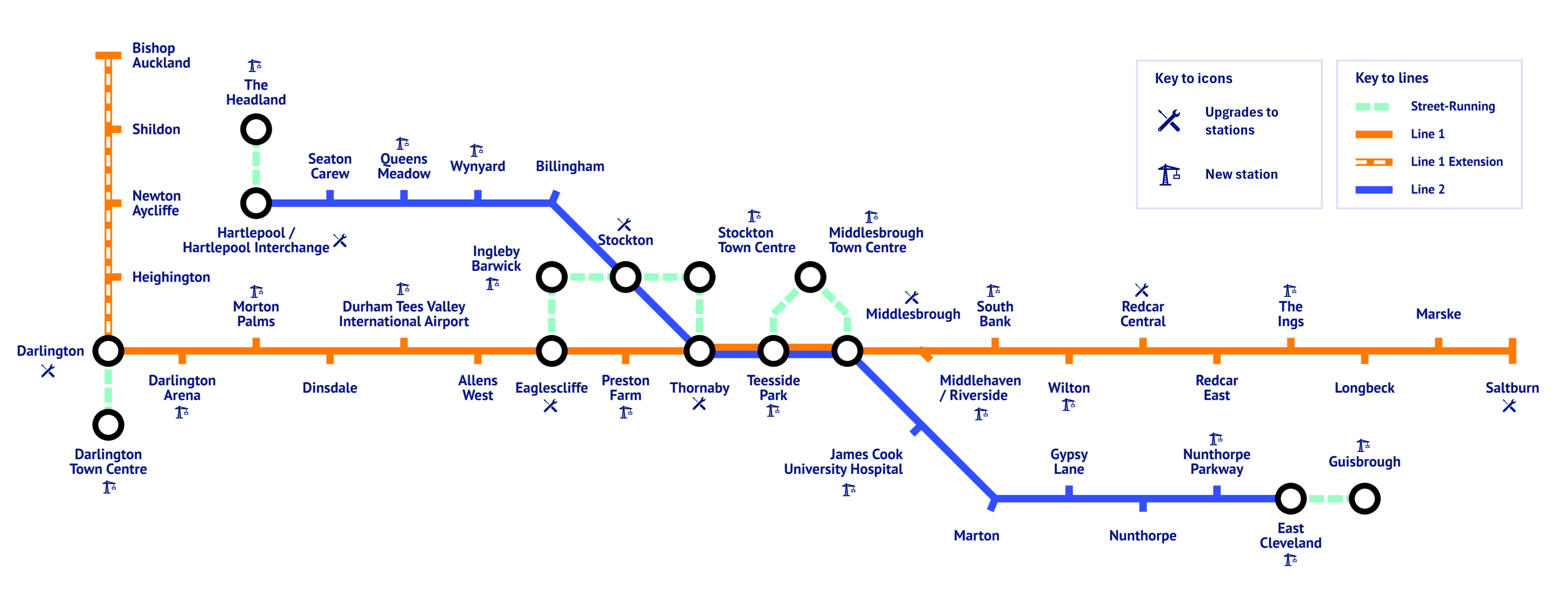
Transit diagram showcasing all discussed or mentioned ideas for the Tees Valley Metro.

Starting in 2006, Seaton Carew was mentioned within the Tees Valley Metro scheme. This was a plan to upgrade the Tees Valley Line and sections of the Esk Valley Line and Durham Coast Line to provide a faster and more frequent service across the North East of England. In the initial phases the services would have been heavy rail mostly along existing alignments with new additional infrastructure and rollingstock. The later phase would have introduced tram-trains to allow street running and further heavy rail extensions.

As part of the scheme, Seaton Carew station would have received improved service to Nunthorpe and Hartlepool, possibly a street-running link to Guisborough and the Headland, as well as new rollingstock.

However, due to a change in government in 2010 and the 2008 financial crisis, the project was ultimately shelved. Several stations eventually got their improvements and there is a possibility of improved rollingstock and services in the future which may affect Seaton Carew.

== Services ==
As of the winter 2023 timetable change, the station is served by an hourly service between Newcastle and Middlesbrough. Most trains continue to Hexham (or Carlisle on Sunday) and Nunthorpe. Two trains per day (three on Sunday) continue to Whitby. Two trains operate directly between Hartlepool and Darlington on Sunday. All services are operated by Northern Trains.

Rolling stock used: Class 156 Super Sprinter and Class 158 Express Sprinter

Preceding station	National Rail	Following station
Billingham	Northern Trains; Durham Coast Line	Hartlepool
	Historical railways	
Greatham; Line open; station closed	North Eastern Railway; Durham Coast Line	West Hartlepool; Line and station open
