= Hospital of God =

Irish hospital in Greatham, County Durham

Coordinates: 54.640°N 1.240°W

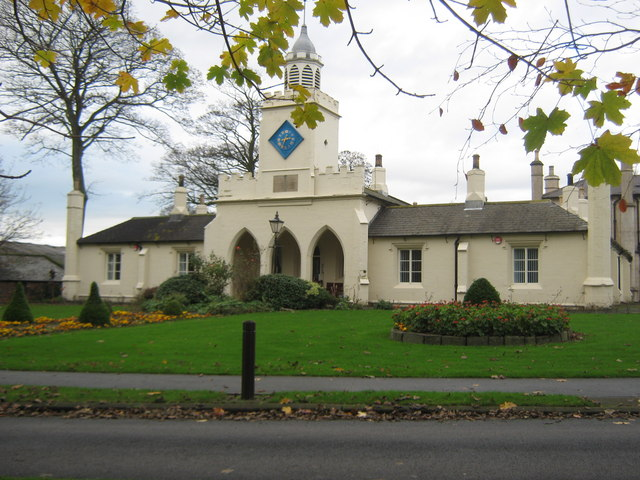
The Hospital of God

The Hospital of God, Greatham, County Durham, was founded in 1273 by the then Bishop of Durham, Robert de Stichell. It was originally a foundation to aid poor people. By the sixteenth century the foundation was used more as a "house of entertainment for gentlemen" and it was not well used for helping the poor. After 1610 there were reforms, and its original mission was resumed.

It now runs day centres and home visiting services for patients, many of whom have dementia, in Greatham, Horden, Seaham and Wheatley Hill.

The Redcar Sword Dancers have performed outside the hospital every year since 1967.
