= Hartlepool railway station =

Railway station in County Durham, England

Hartlepool
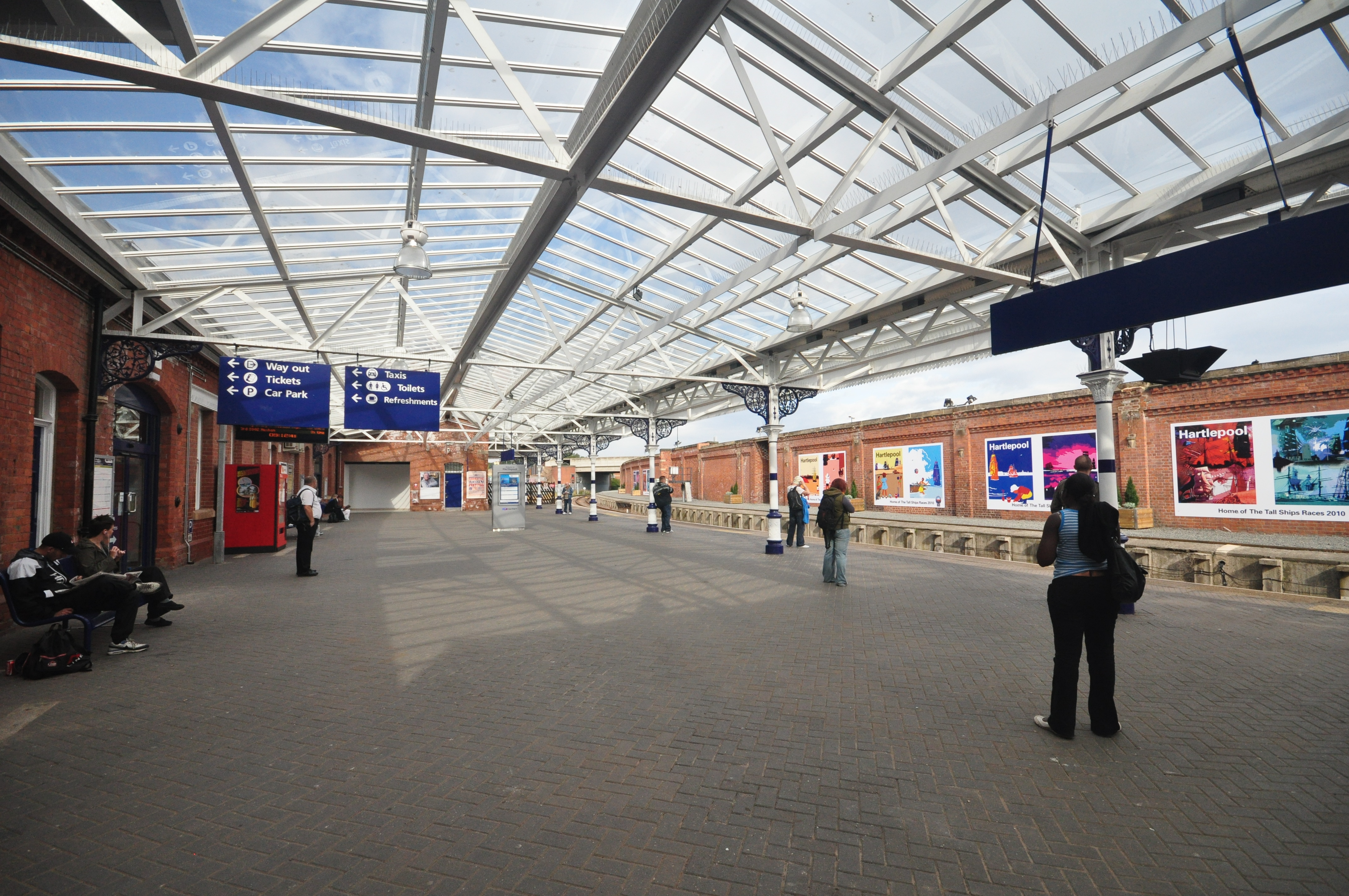

General information
- Location: Hartlepool, Borough of Hartlepool, England
- Coordinates: 54°41′13″N 1°12′28″W
- Grid reference: NZ512327
- Owner: Network Rail
- Manager: Northern Trains
- Platforms: 3 (1 & 2 are an island platform and 3 is its own entity)
- Tracks: 3 (two through lines with a siding)

Other information
- Station code: HPL
- Classification: DfT category D

History
- Original company: Stockton and Hartlepool Railway
- Pre-grouping: North Eastern Railway
- Post-grouping: London and North Eastern Railway, British Rail (North Eastern Region)

Key dates
- 9 February 1841: Opened as Hartlepool West
- February 1848: Renamed West Hartlepool
- 3 May 1880: Resited
- 26 April 1967: Renamed Hartlepool

Passengers
- 2020/21: ▼0.169 million
- 2021/22: ▲0.530 million
- 2022/23: ▲0.553 million
- 2023/24: ▲0.627 million
- 2024–25: ▲0.714 million
- Interchange: 3,344
Location
- Location within County Durham
Notes
- Passenger statistics from the Office of Rail and Road

Hartlepool is a railway station on the Durham Coast Line, which runs between Newcastle and Middlesbrough. The station serves the port town of Hartlepool, in County Durham, England; it is situated 18 miles 5 chains (29 km) south-east of Sunderland. It is owned by Network Rail and managed by Northern Trains.

== History ==
The Stockton and Hartlepool Railway, which connected the town of West Hartlepool with the Clarence Railway near Billingham, was opened for goods on 12 November 1839 and to passengers on 1 December 1839. A station named Hartlepool West was opened on 9 February 1841; this was renamed West Hartlepool in February 1848, and closed on 3 May 1880 when it was replaced by a new West Hartlepool station. This, in turn, was renamed Hartlepool on 26 April 1967 when West Hartlepool was merged with Hartlepool and following the complete closure of the former Hartlepool Dock and Railway station in the Headland, previously known as Hartlepool, in 1964.

The station has two platforms currently in use: a bi-directionally signalled through platform (the original down platform), used by almost all timetabled services, and a south-facing bay platform with only one weekly booked departure. The former up platform 3 was long disused since the footbridge linking the platforms was removed in the late 1990s; however, there was a scheme to reopen the platform which was completed in 2024.

=== Tees Valley Metro ===
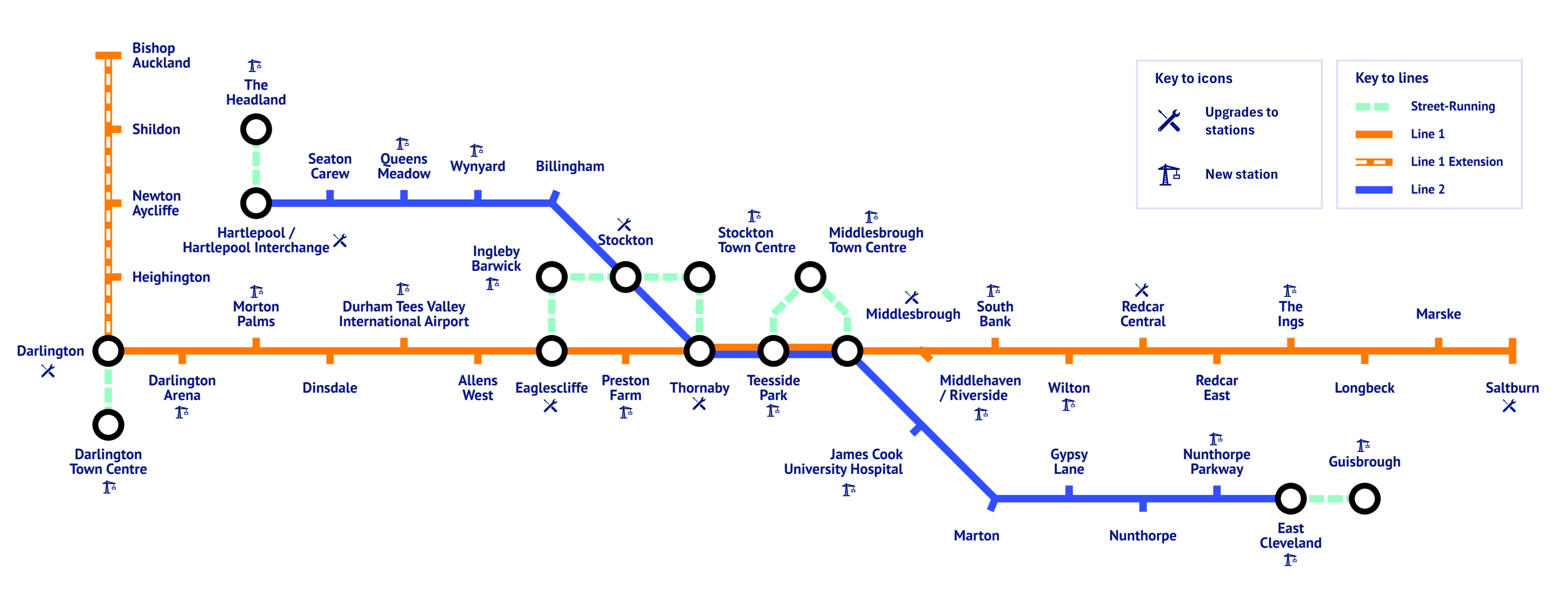
A Transit diagram showcasing all discussed or mentioned ideas for the Tees Valley Metro

Starting in 2006, Hartlepool was mentioned within the Tees Valley Metro scheme. This was a plan to upgrade the Tees Valley Line and sections of the Esk Valley Line and Durham Coast Line to provide a faster and more frequent service across the North East of England. In the initial phases, the services would have been heavy rail mostly along existing alignments with new additional infrastructure and rollingstock. The later phase would have introduced tram-trains to allow street running and further heavy rail extensions.

As part of the scheme, Hartlepool station would have received improved service to Nunthorpe, possibly a street-running link to Guisborough and the Headland, as well as new rolling stock. Furthermore, the station would have received a new glazed waiting area on the main platform. The existing bay platform would have been repaved and new waiting shelters provided and the north side platform would have been resurfaced and had new artwork installed. New electronic information screens were also mentioned, as well as a new bus/rail interchange.

However, due to a change in government in 2010 and the 2008 financial crisis, the project was ultimately shelved. Several stations eventually got their improvements, including Hartlepool, and there is a possibility of improved rolling stock and services in the future.

=== Redevelopment ===
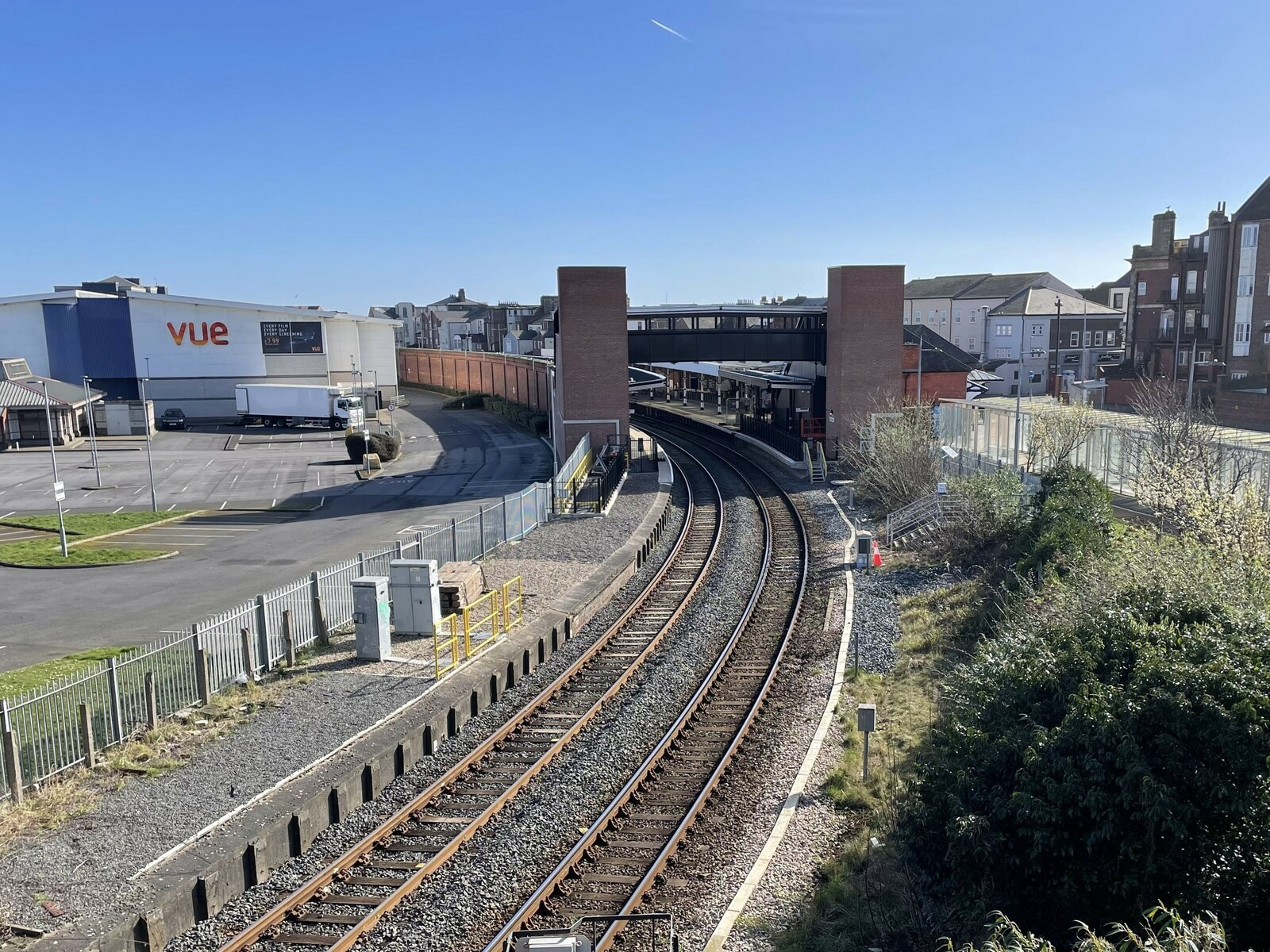
The station in 2024 with rebuilt platform, lifts added and rebuilt footbridge

Between November 2009 and August 2010 (ahead of the town hosting the Tall Ships' Races), the station was extensively refurbished as part of a £4 million scheme to improve station facilities and integrate it into the new Hartlepool Interchange; works which were originally planned under the Tees Valley Metro project. The line through the station was also resignalled in spring 2010, as part of the Durham Coast modernisation scheme, with the consequent loss of three manual signal boxes in and around the station. A new waiting room was also added to the station in 2011.

In August 2013, Grand Central proposed reopening the disused third platform as part of its track access application extension, although they never implemented this proposal. In September 2020, Tees Valley Combined Authority launched a £1.5 million study to investigate the feasibility of a similar scheme to reopen the former up platform so as to improve capacity through the station. In March 2022, it was announced that funding had been secured to bring the old platform back into use, with a new footbridge and lifts installed, by June 2023. It was planned that the new platform would open in the spring of 2024, after delays in the work to install the new lifts and bridge. Platform 3 was placed back into use in June 2024.

== Facilities ==
The station has a staffed ticket office, which is open from 07:30 to 18:30 Mondays through Saturdays; it is closed on Sundays. A self-service ticket machine is also provided near the station entrance. Ticket barriers have been operation at the station since September 2017.

Train running information is offered via automatic announcements, dot matrix display screens and timetable posters. There are toilets in the ticket office and a waiting room on the concourse, along with vending machines dispensing snacks and cold drinks. Step-free access is available from the entrance to the platforms.

== Services ==
The station is served by two train operating companies:

=== Grand Central ===
There are four trains per day heading south towards London King's Cross via York. Heading north towards Sunderland, there are five trains per day on weekdays, with four and three trains per day on Saturday and Sunday respectively.

=== Northern Trains ===
There is an hourly service between Newcastle and Middlesbrough. Most trains continue to Hexham northbound (or Carlisle on Sunday) and Nunthorpe southbound. Two trains per day (three on Sunday) continue to Whitby. Two trains operate directly between Hartlepool and Darlington on Sundays.

Preceding station	National Rail	Following station
Seaton Carew	Northern Trains; Durham Coast Line	Horden
Eaglescliffe	Grand Central; North Eastern	Seaham
	Historical railways	
Seaton Carew; Line and station open	London and North Eastern Railway; Durham Coast Line	Hart; Line open; station closed
Terminus	London and North Eastern Railway; Hartlepool–Ferryhill	Hart; Line and station closed
Terminus	London and North Eastern Railway; Hartlepool–Sunderland via Haswell	Hart; Line and station closed
Terminus	London and North Eastern Railway; Hartlepool–West Hartlepool	Hartlepool (HD&R); Line and station closed
