= Peter Townend =

Peter Townend may refer to:

- Peter Townend (novelist) (1935–1999), British novelist, thriller writer, photographer and journalist
- Peter Townend (surfer) (born 1953), Australian surfer
- Peter Townend (editor) (1921–2001), social editor and genealogist

== See also ==
- Pete Townshend (born 1945), British rock guitarist of the band The Who
- Peter Townsend (disambiguation)
