= William Hylton Dyer Longstaffe =

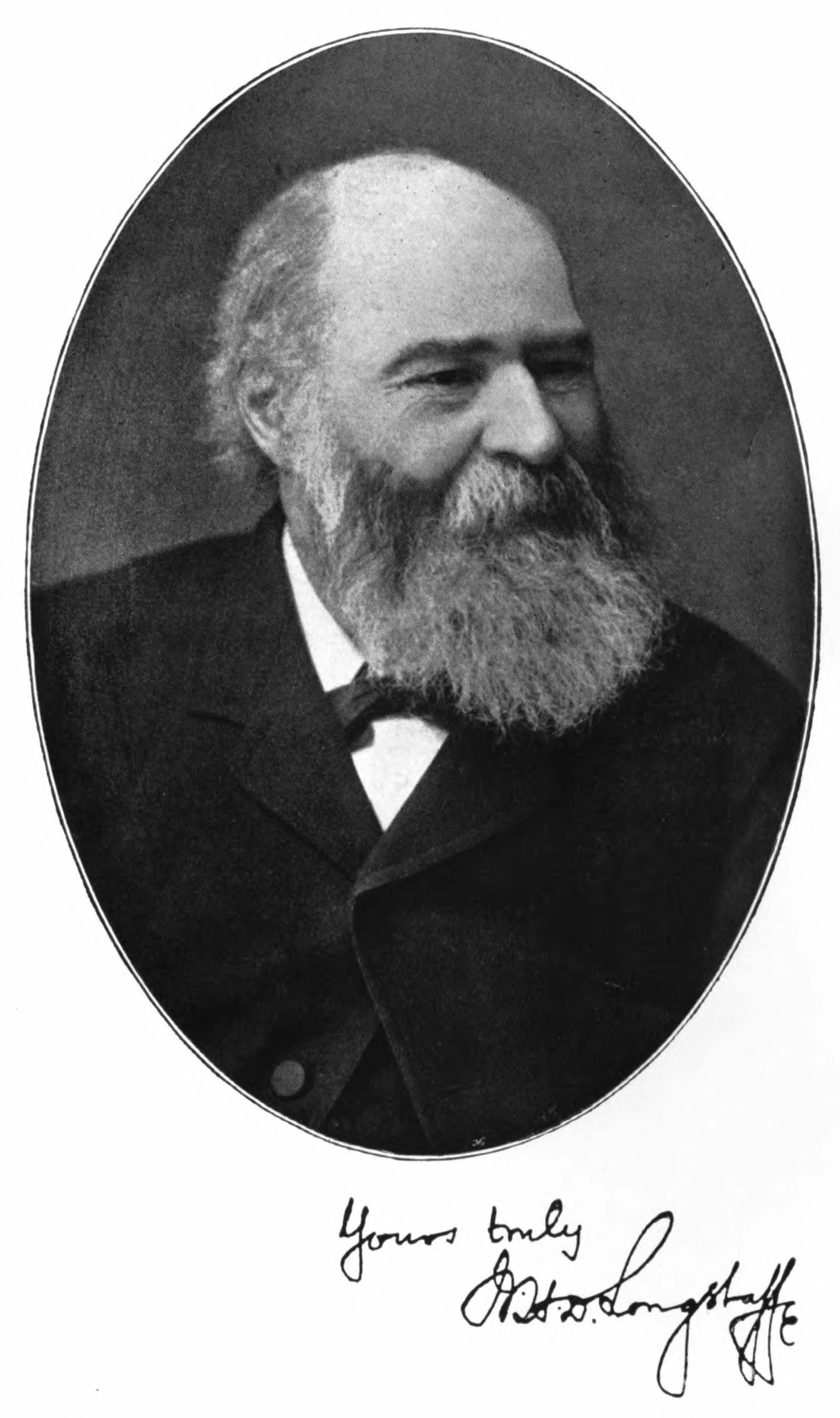
- Born: 2 September 1826; Norton, Stockton-on-Tees
- Died: 4 February 1898 (aged 71)
- Burial place: Jesmond Old Cemetery, Newcastle upon Tyne
- Occupation: Solicitor
- Known for: Numismatics, church history, journal editor
- Spouse: Margaret Thompson

William Hylton Dyer Longstaffe (2 September 1826 – 4 February 1898) was an antiquarian, historian and solicitor from Norton, North East England. He is best known for his antiquarian research, particularly into the fields of numismatics, church history and archaeology, and the history of the town of Darlington. He was vice-president of the Society of Antiquaries of Newcastle upon Tyne as well an editor of the journal Archaeologia Aeliana and editor for the Surtees Society.

== Early life ==
Longstaffe was born in Norton, near Stockton-on-Tees on 2 September 1826. His father, William Hilton Longstaffe (1792–1842), was a surgeon. His mother was Elizabeth Dyer Franks (1802–1881), and through his mother he was the a descendant of the poet John Dyer (1699–1757). Upon the death of his father on 1 November 1842 he left school and was apprenticed in York to a law stationer, later moving to Thirsk, and in 1845 to Darlington under the supervision of John Shields Peacock.

== Research ==
One of the first public lectures given by Longstaffe was at the Sun Inn, Darlington, in January 1848. The success of the lecture would later prompt him to undertaken his book History of Darlington (completed in 1854). In 1850 Longstaffe moved to Gateshead and joined the Society of Antiquaries of Newcastle upon Tyne. In 1861 he was a co-founder of the Architectural and Archaeological Society of Durham and Northumberland. He was a member of the Surtees Society in 1855, and was elected vice-president until his death. He acted as editor for three of their volumes.

== Professional work ==
When Longstaffe moved to Gateshead he worked as a managing clerk for the law firm Messers. Kell & Apedaile. He signed the roll of attorneys in January 1857. Upon the retirement of Apedaile, Longstaffe became a joint partner of Kell & Longstaff. In 1862, after the death of William Kell, Longstaffe became the sole owner of the business. He was active in a number of local Gateshead institutions, including Gateshead Mechanics Institute for which he was secretary from 1864-1868, and honorary secretary of Gateshead Dispensary from 1862-1875.

== Bibliography ==
Longstaffe published in a variety of outlets, including the newspaper The Gateshead Observer, and the journals Archaeologia Aeliana, Proceedings of the Archaeological Institute and Numismatic Chronicle.

- Longstaffe, W H D, 1854 The History and Antiquities of the Parish of Darlington in the Bishoprick. Darlington and Stockton Times, Darlington.
- Longstaffe, W H D 1857 Frances Radclyffe, First Earl Derwentwater: Chiefly from papers presented by WJ Forster and others in possession of John Fenwick Esq, FSA, Archaeologia Aeliana, Ser. 2, i, 95-130.
- Longstaffe, W H D . 1858 Early Mention of Coffee in Durham, Archaeologia Aeliana, Ser. 2, ii,136.
- Longstaffe, W. H. D. 1858b Is the Cathedral within the City of Durham? Archaeologia Aeliana. Ser. 2, ii, 203-215.
- Longstaffe, W. H. D. 1859 The Church of Guyzance, Archaeologia Aeliana, Ser.2, iii,129-145.
- Longstaffe, W. H. D. 1860a The New Castle upon Tyne (with illustrations), Archaeologia Aeliana, Ser. 2, iv, 45-139.
- Longstaffe, W. H. D. 1860b, Whickham Church, Archaeologia Aeliana, Ser. 2, iv, 63-66.
- Longstaffe, W. H. D. 1865, Stained glass from Durham Cathedral, Archaeologia Aeliana, Ser. 2, vii, 125-141,
- Longstaffe, W H D, 1867 Memoirs of the life of Mr. Ambrose Barnes, Late Merchant and Sometimes Alderman of Newcastle upon Tyne. Publications of the Surtees Society, 50. Andrews and Co., Durham City.
- Longstaffe, W. H. D. 1880, Escombe Church, Archaeologia Aeliana, Ser. 2, viii, 281-286.
- Longstaffe, W. H. D. 1880b, The Northern Stations of the Notitia, Archaeologia Aeliana, Ser. 2, viii, 287-292.
- Longstaffe, W.H.D., Booth, J. eds., 1886. Halmota prioratus Dunelmensis. Extracts from the Halmote Court of Manor Rolls of the Prior and Convent of Durham, Surtees Society, Andrews and Co., Durham, 82.
- Longstaffe, W. H. D. 1892. ‘Norton’. Archaeologia Aeliana, Ser. 2, 15, 1-13.
