= Jonathan Townsend =

English cricketer

Personal information
- Full name: Jonathan Richard Arthur Townsend
- Born: 30 November 1942 (age 83); Filkins, Oxfordshire, England
- Batting: Right-handed
- Relatives: Charlie Townsend (grandfather); David Townsend (father)

Domestic team information
- Years: Team
- 1964–1965: Oxford University
- 1964: Durham
- 1967–1968: Wiltshire
- 1973–1975: Suffolk

Career statistics
Competition	First-class
Matches	10
Runs scored	245
Batting average	13.61
100s/50s	0/1
Top score	64
Catches/stumpings	1/–
- Source: Cricinfo, 4 June 2019

Jonathan Richard Arthur Townsend (born 30 November 1942) is a former first-class cricketer who played for Oxford University in 1964 and 1965.

Jonathan Townsend was educated at Winchester College before attending Corpus Christi College, Oxford. A batsman, he played a few matches for Oxford without gaining a Blue. His highest score was 64, batting at number three against the touring Australians in 1964, when he was "the only University batsman to show any confidence in the first innings", and no one else in his team scored more than 34.

Townsend also played 20 games of Minor Counties cricket between 1964 and 1975 for Durham, Wiltshire, and Suffolk. His grandfather, Charlie Townsend, and his father, David Townsend, played Test cricket for England.
