= 442oons =

YouTube channel (born 1981)

- Born: Dean Stobbart; 1981 (age 44–45); Stockton-on-Tees, England

YouTube information
- Channel: 442oons
- Years active: 2013–present
- Genres: Football; comedy; parody
- Subscribers: 4.72 million
- Views: 4.1 billion
- Last updated: 8 August 2026

442oons is an English-language YouTube channel set up by Dean Stobbart that focuses on animated parodies of various football topics. The channel has accumulated over 4.5 million subscribers and more than 4 billion views over its twelve years of activity. He is known for his comedic football animations and songs, one of his most popular works is "The Frontmen" which includes many footballers such as Cristiano Ronaldo, Lionel Messi, Neymar, Luis Suárez, Kylian Mbappé, Erling Haaland and Lamine Yamal. He is regarded as one of the greatest football creators on YouTube. He also makes parody versions of footballers, for example, Chewy Suarez. Another great work made by him was "MSN Song", which is a song based off of the MSN Barcelona trio in their game against Bayern Munich in the 14/15 season. Sometimes in videos, Dean appears as his own character, for example, the Man City 3 - 1 Man Utd video in 2018, which is a song sung by the parody version of Jose Mourinho.

Stobbart has worked with OneFootball, Bundesliga, and many other football brands to make videos on their channels.

== History ==
The channel's creator, Dean Stobbart, originally a teacher from Norton, County Durham, had in the past been a part-time voice actor who also did some animation for his lessons. He said he saw a gap in the market that "no one had really done football cartoons before", so he made his first animated video, a parody of Uruguayan footballer Luis Suárez and then-Arsenal manager Arsène Wenger in a cartoon parody of a scene from The Silence of the Lambs in August 2013. Since then, he has worked with organisations such as Talksport and Sky Sports on animations. His videos have also been featured on Metro and the Spanish Marca. He also has a Facebook account with 1.8 million followers, a TikTok account with 774.6 thousand followers and a Twitter account with 149.6 thousand followers.

Although Stobbart had originally created his videos by himself, he hired three animators, Sam Dunscombe, Mike Myler and James Williams. In 442oons' 3-million-subscribers video in July 2020, Sam confirmed his departure from the channel. Currently with 4 animators, Lauren Bagstaff and Karl Hargreaves are the additional two animators with Myler and Williams.

He also has been in partnership with the Bundesliga YouTube channel (English), OneFootball, The Football Republic (most notably the fictional tabloid talk show: 'The Roy Keane Show'), FREEbets and other YouTube channels.

== Awards and nominations ==
=== Football Content Awards ===
Year	Category	Work	Result	Ref.
2015	Best Video Football Blog (Fans' Choice)	442oons	Won	
2016	Best Video Football Blog (Fans' Choice)	442oons	Won	
2018	Best Football Video Creator (Fans' Award)	442oons	Won	
