= Frank Townsend (cricketer, born 1847) =

English cricketer

Frank Townsend (17 October 1847 – 25 October 1920) was an English amateur cricketer who played first-class cricket from 1870 to 1891 for Gloucestershire County Cricket Club. Townsend represented the Gentlemen on a number of occasions between 1874 and 1885. He was a right-handed batsman and an underarm right arm slow bowler who made 179 career appearances. Townsend scored 5,110 runs including two centuries with a highest score of 136. He held 131 catches and took 101 wickets with a best bowling analysis of 6/31.

His son Frank Norton Townsend (born on 16 September 1875) was also a Gloucestershire cricketer.
