= Geoff Deehan =

English film & TV producer

- Born: Geoff Deehan; 14 June 1952; Norton, County Durham, England
- Occupations: Producer, writer, director
- Children: 2

Geoff Deehan (born 14 June 1952) is a film and television producer who has worked on projects such as The Heist and Equinox. He is also the creator and producer of the The Plane Crash documentary on Channel Four.

== Early life ==
Geoff Deehan was born on 14 June 1952 in Norton, County Durham. He left in 1970 to study electronics engineering at the University of Sussex.

== Career ==
Deehan spent 15 years working for the BBC as a television and radio producer and Head of Science Programmes during which time he developed such strands as Science Now and Medicine Now. In his role as Head of Factual Programmes with Union Pictures, which he joined in 1990, he produced a string of successful television documentaries for Horizon and Equinox at the BBC and Channel Four respectively. He produced a four-part series on the exotic people, places and animals of the Indonesian Archipelago which was aired on Sky and is the producer of The Plane Crash, a documentary about the 2012 Boeing 727 crash experiment in which an international team of scientists, experts and elite pilots deliberately crash landed a 170-seat passenger jet to study the mechanics of a plane crash in real time. The Plane Crash received viewer figures of over 4 million and was nominated for a BAFTA in the Specialist Factual category in 2013.

Deehan is a former 'Science Writer of the Year' and a Sony Award winner for his BBC Radio programme, Medicine Now. As Executive Producer, he also won a Royal Television Society Award for his documentary, Losing It about the effect of mental attitude upon sports performance.

Deehan is the successful author of two books, The Descent of Mind and The Keys to Creativity, considered by many to be the seminal publication on the subject. He is also the founder of The Media Training Company, a training organisation which coaches people to get the best out of media encounters and PR crises.

== Personal life ==
Deehan lives in Cheshire with his wife, Amanda.
