= Norton, County Durham =

Town and civil parish in County Durham, England

Coordinates: 54.589°N 1.3157°W

Norton
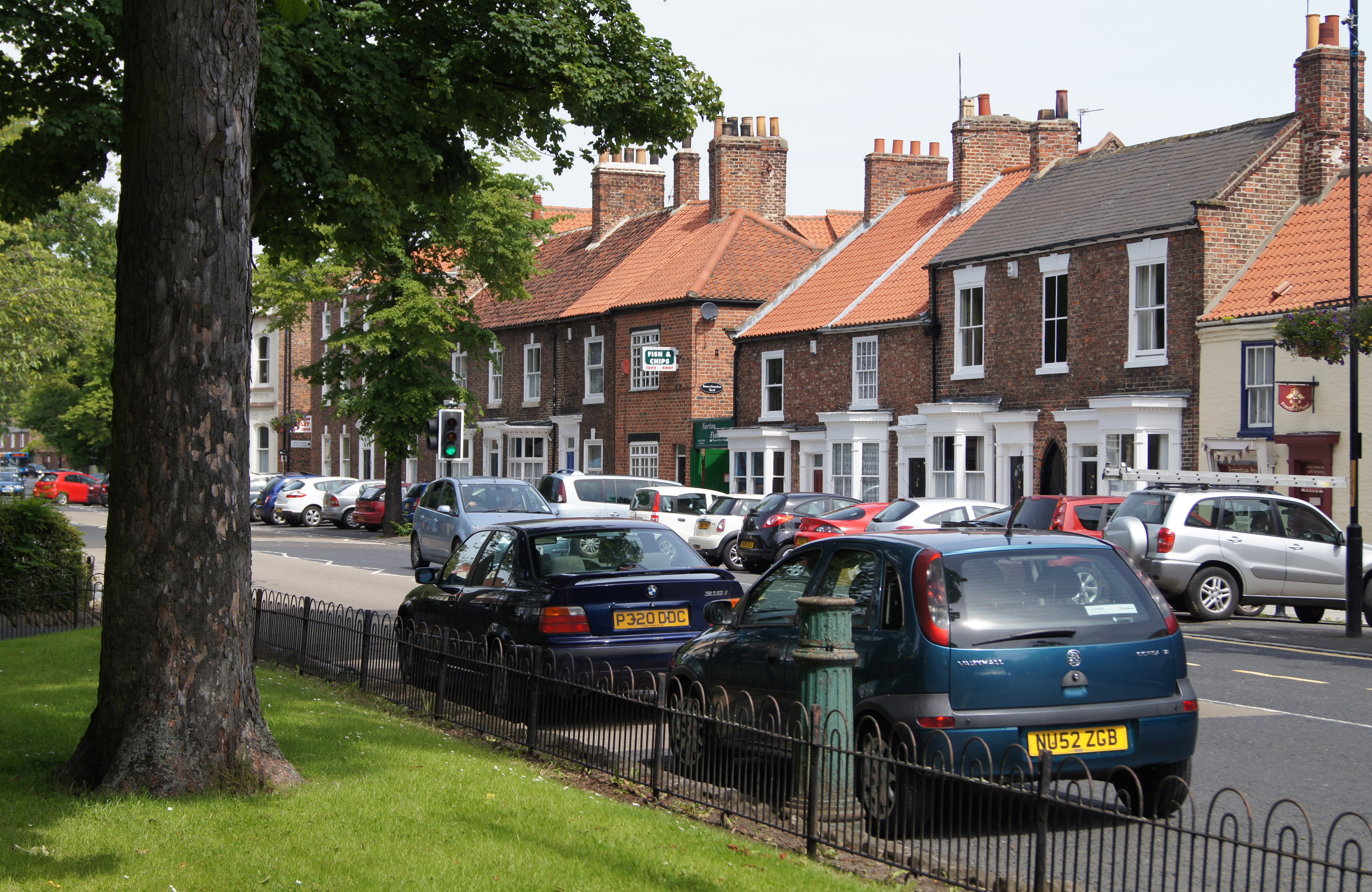
- High Street, Norton

- Location within County Durham
- Population: 20,829
- OS grid reference: NZ443217
- Unitary authority: Stockton-on-Tees
- Ceremonial county: County Durham
- Region: North East
- Country: England
- Sovereign state: United Kingdom
- Places: List: Roseworth
- Post town: STOCKTON-ON-TEES
- Postcode district: TS20
- Dialling code: 01642
- Police: Cleveland
- Fire: Cleveland
- Ambulance: North East
- UK Parliament: Stockton North

Norton, also known as Norton-on-Tees, is a town and civil parish in the Borough of Stockton-on-Tees in County Durham, England. The town includes the wards of Wolviston, Wynyard, Ragworth and Roseworth. The town had a population of 20,829 in the 2011 Census.

The area's centre dates back to at least the Anglo-Saxon period. It was the centre of an ancient parish that once included the chapelry of Stockton, which became a separate parish in 1713.

== History ==
In 1982, the chance discovery of human bones by school children playing on a rope swing near the Mill Lane area of the town, led to the unearthing of an Anglo-Saxon pagan cemetery. Excavations in 1984 revealed 120 burials (117 inhumations and 3 cremations) in graves that contained assorted personal items such as spears, belt buckles and brooches. The remains and objects collected suggest the site was dated to around AD 540–610.

To the south end of High Street, the Victoria Jubilee Memorial Cross stands where the market place was once situated. The red sandstone Anglian style cross commemorates Queen Victoria's Diamond Jubilee in 1897. Further along, and on the opposite side of the High Street are the Fox almshouses, also founded in 1897 at the bequest of local brewer John Henry Fox.

Norton was an ancient parish, which also included the chapelry of Stockton, which became a separate parish in 1713. Most of the parish of Norton, including the main built-up area, was absorbed into the municipal borough and parish of Stockton in 1913. A residual civil parish of Norton, covering just the more rural western part of the old parish, continued to exist until 1 April 1968 when it was abolished and absorbed into the County Borough of Teesside along with Stockton and other areas. In 1961 the parish had a population of 416. It is now in the unparished area of Stockton-on-Tees.

== Geography ==
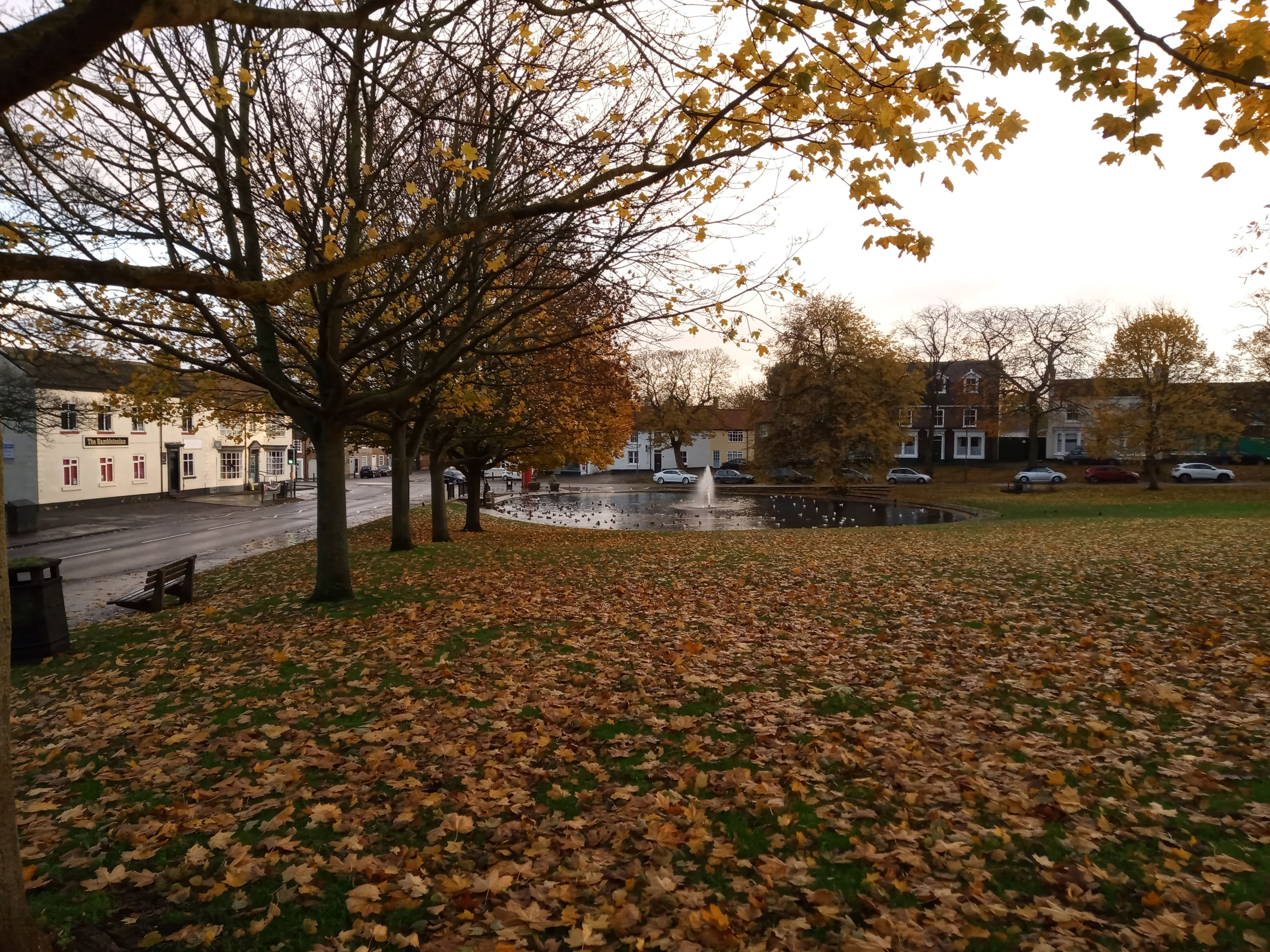
The Green

At the north end of Norton centre there is a large village green with a duckpond, surrounded by mostly Georgian houses and cottages. The ancient parish church of St. Mary the Virgin stands on the west side of the village Green.

Norton's wide and tree-lined High Street has a number of shops, hairdressers, boutiques, cafés, a library, photographic studio and a traditional fish & chips shop, as well as a mixture of 18th century and 19th century townhouses, cottages and modern apartments. Away from the village lie the housing estates of Albany, Glebe, Crooksbarn and Norton Grange (originally Blue Hall).

== St Mary's Church ==
St Mary the Virgin, the ancient parish church that stands on the village green, is the only cruciform Anglo-Saxon church in northern England. Its crossing tower with eight triangular head windows has a battlemented top of later date, and there is a 14th-century effigy of a knight in chainmail. Residing under the church floor there is claimed to be an escape tunnel used by the Saxons and priests when in danger, though it is more probably a drainage culvert. The tunnel leads under the church floor and Norton Green, eventually surfacing in the Albany housing estate. The church floor was recently renovated and Saxon remains and artefacts were discovered in the tunnel entrance. St Mary's was until the Reformation a Catholic church – which is true of all English churches pre-dating the Reformation.

The grave of John Walker, the inventor of friction matches, is located in the churchyard.

Norton's Catholic population now worship at St Joseph's in Darlington Lane. The church opened in 1933 and is part of the St Hilda Partnership within the Hexham and Newcastle Diocese.

== Red House School ==
Located in the town is Red House School, an independent school established in 1929. Adjacent to St. Mary's Church is Red House Nursery & Infant School, which combines state of the art modern buildings with classrooms in the former Old Vicarage. On the opposite side of the village green resides Red House Preparatory and Main School. In May 2012, the school announced its intention to relocate to nearby Wynyard Park stating that it had outgrown its existing site in Norton. This, however, did not occur as the school decided to improve the existing site.

== Sport ==
The Norton (Teesside) Sports Complex is situated on Station Road and dates back to 1847 when it was the home of Norton Cricket Club. At the club's Centenary Dinner in 1947, the members decided to buy the ground (and a further twelve acres surrounding it) with a view to developing it into one of the finest sports complexes in the north of England. During the past few decades further land was acquired and now as well as being home to Norton Cricket Club (which play in the NYSD cricket premier league).

The complex is also home to the Billingham Synthonia Football Club and is now again home to Norton & Stockton Ancients Football Club, reinstated in 2019 having folded 3 years previously in 2016.

== Notable events ==
6 August 1856, John Warner and Sons cast the first bell for Big Ben, but it cracked beyond repair while being tested at Westminster. Another bell was later recast at the Whitechapel Bell Foundry in London.

14 July 1977, Queen Elizabeth II passed through Norton by car, in front of spectators during her Silver Jubilee royal visit to the region.

11 November 2006, Dragon's Den businessman Duncan Bannatyne (who owned a house on the High Street at the time, later moving to nearby Wynyard) was married at St Mary's Church in Norton. Celebrities at the ceremony included Anna Ryder Richardson, Cherie Lunghi, Gary McCausland, Dragons' Den presenter Evan Davis and fellow Dragons Theo Paphitis, Richard Farleigh, Simon Woodroffe and Deborah Meaden

== Image gallery ==
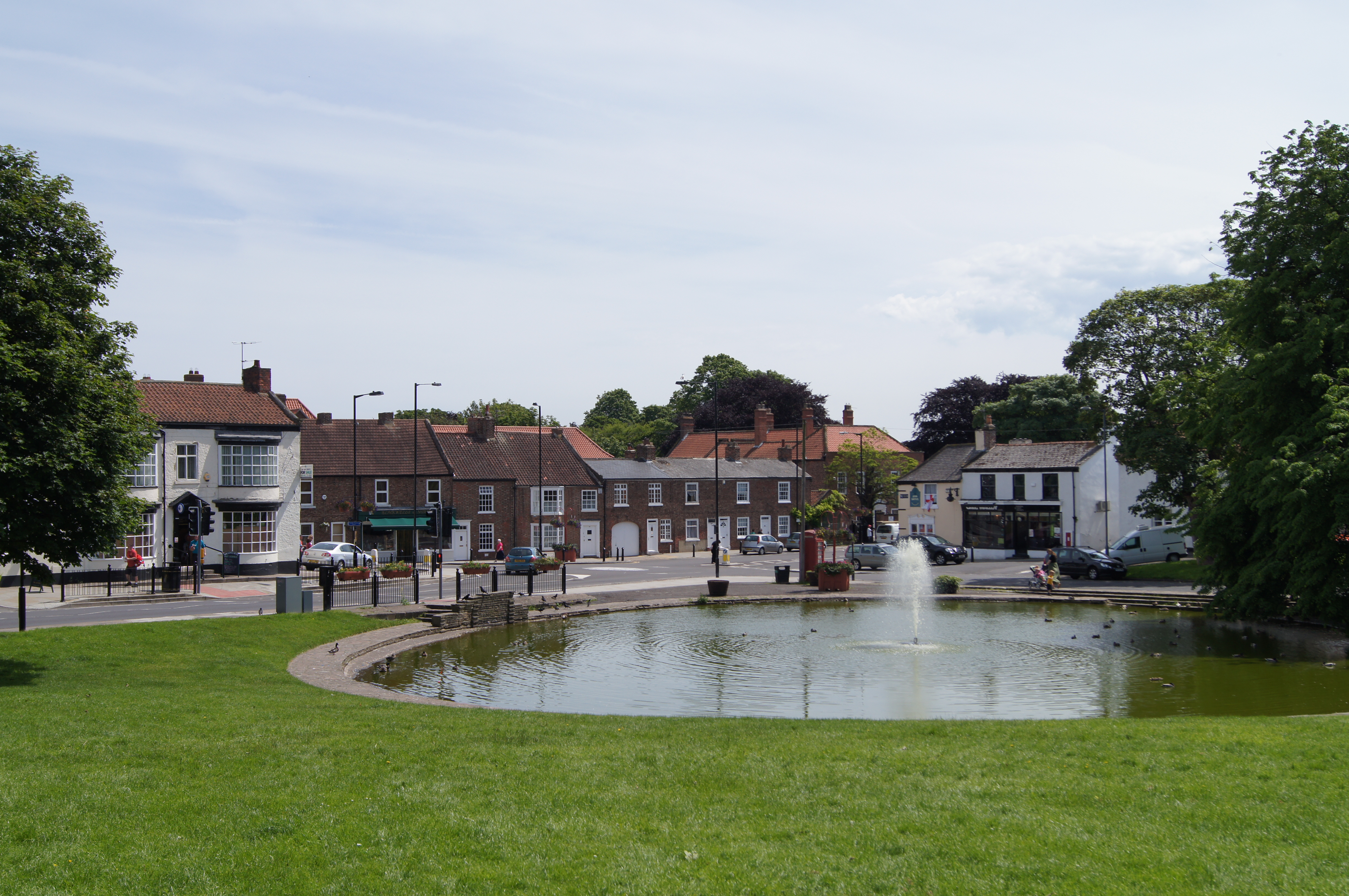
Village Green

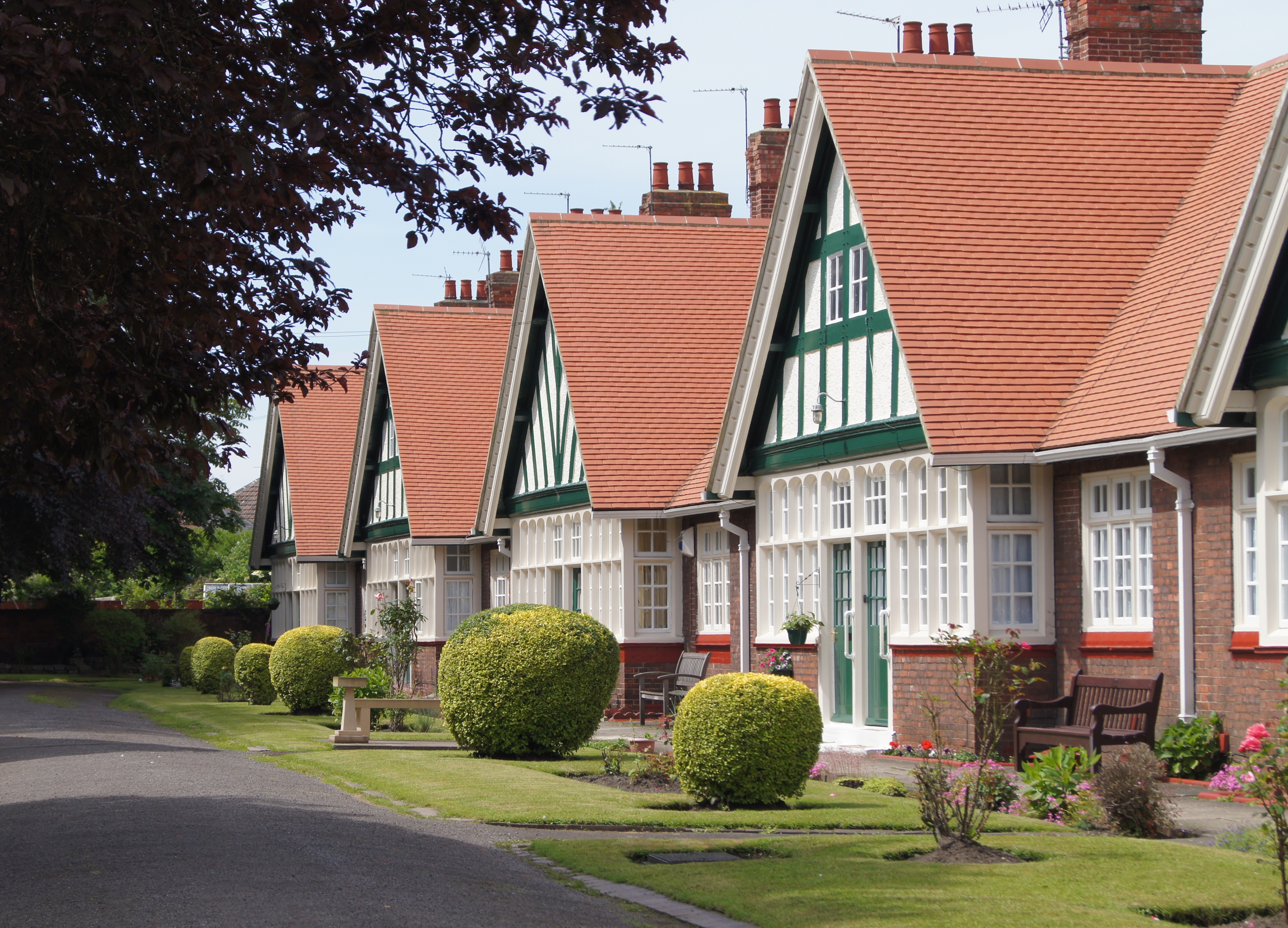
Fox Almshouses

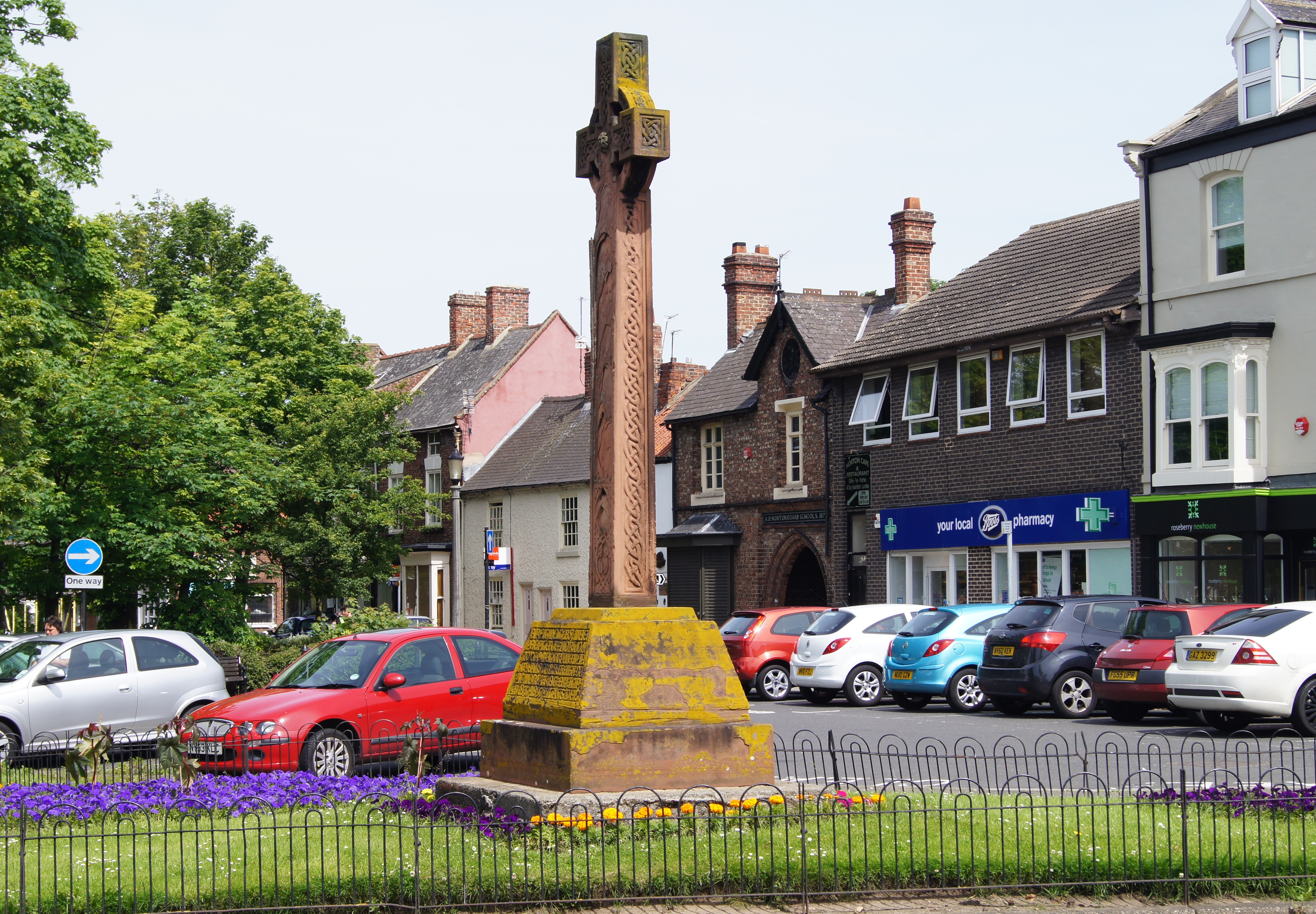
1897 Jubilee Memorial Cross

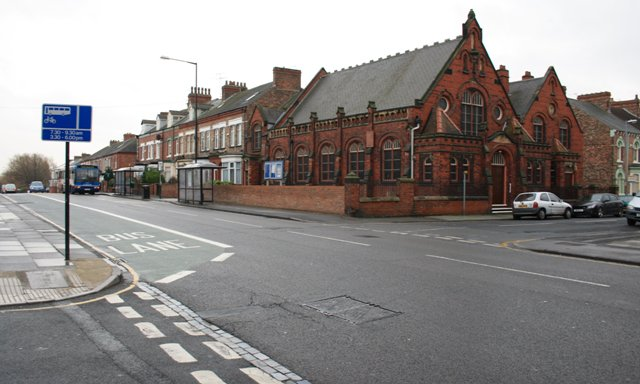
Methodist Church

== Notable people from Norton ==
- Geoff Deehan – television and film producer
- Thomas Jefferson Hogg – barrister and writer
- Stevie Lynn – professional wrestler
- Christopher Middleton – navigator
- Gary Pallister – professional footballer with Middlesbrough, Manchester United, and England
- Franc Roddam – film director
- Dean Stobbart – creator of the YouTube football cartoon channel 442oons
- Rear-Admiral Polycarpus Taylor
- David Townsend – Test cricketer
- Peter Townsend – cricketer
- John Walker (1781–1859) – inventor of the friction match, buried in the grounds of St Mary's Church, Norton
- Macaulay Langstaff – footballer for Notts County FC and National League (division) record goal scorer
- William Hylton Dyer Longstaffe (1826–1898) – antiquarian researcher and historian
- James Minto - Durham and England Under 19 cricketer
