= Frank Townsend (cricketer, born 1875) =

English cricketer

Personal information
- Full name: Frank Norton Townsend
- Born: 16 September 1875; Bristol, England
- Died: 25 May 1901 (aged 25); Cape Colony, South Africa
- Batting: Right-handed

Domestic team information
- Years: Team
- 1896-1899: Gloucestershire
- Source: Cricinfo, 30 March 2014

Frank Norton Townsend (16 September 1875 – 25 May 1901) was an English cricketer. He played for Gloucestershire between 1896 and 1899. He was a British officer in the Second Boer War and was killed in Cape Colony in 1901.
