= Charlie Townsend =

English cricketer

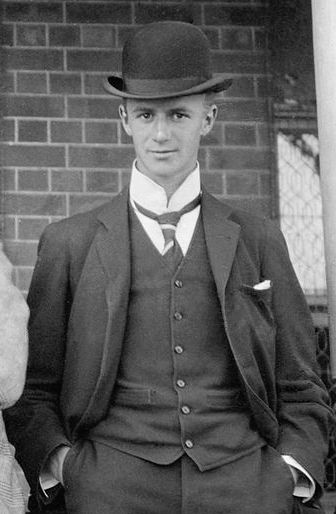
- Townsend in 1898

Personal information
- Born: 7 November 1876; Bristol, England
- Died: 17 October 1958 (aged 81); Stockton-on-Tees, Durham, England
- Batting: Left-handed
- Bowling: Leg Break

International information
- National side: England
- Test debut: 15 June 1899 v Australia
- Last Test: 16 August 1899 v Australia

Career statistics
Competition	Test	First-class
Matches	2	199
Runs scored	51	9,512
Batting average	17.00	30.29
100s/50s	0/0	21/40
Top score	38	224*
Balls bowled	140	29,791
Wickets	3	725
Bowling average	25.00	23.11
5 wickets in innings	0	68
10 wickets in match	0	18
Best bowling	3/50	9/48
Catches/stumpings	0/–	193/–
- Source: CricInfo, 30 December 2021

Charles Lucas Townsend (7 November 1876 – 17 October 1958) was a Gloucestershire cricketer. An all-round cricketer, Townsend was classically stylish, left-handed batsman, who was able to hit well despite his slender build. His off-side strokes were particularly effective, and his driving allowed him to score at a consistent pace throughout his major innings. In his younger days Townsend was also a spin bowler, who relied chiefly on a big break from leg but could also turn the ball the other way. He was often extremely difficult on sticky wickets but very rarely effective on good ones.

== Career ==
Townsend first emerged as a leg break bowler from Clifton College at the age of 16 in 1893. He took 21 wickets in four games and showed, despite his very slight build, the ability to get through a lot of bowling and spin the ball prodigiously from leg. In one innings against Middlesex, he bowled 70 five-ball overs (equivalent to 58 six-ball overs). In that season, his county's wicket-keeper, William Brain, completed the only instance in first-class cricket of a hat-trick of stumpings, taken off Townsend's bowling. The following year, Townsend's record was modest though Grace gave him a good deal of bowling on soft pitches, and he was seen as not physically strong enough for county cricket by most critics of the day.

It was in 1895 that the sensation of Townsend's career occurred. Schoolwork meant he played only one match up to 21 July – taking only two wickets for 94 – yet in Gloucestershire's remaining 11 matches he took 122 wickets. With increased physical strength, Townsend spun the ball so much on the treacherous pitches upon which almost all these games were played that, though he was often freely hit, batsmen eventually fell to his turning balls. During this period, Townsend was so successful that he was kept on by Grace for all but thirty of 659 five-ball overs bowled by Gloucestershire from one end. (Note: His full analysis for these eleven County Championship games was: 630 overs and one ball 151 maidens 1467 runs 122 wickets (average 12.02))

During May, June and July 1896, when the weather was consistently dry, Townsend proved extremely ineffective. Though when the rain came he took 38 wickets in the last four matches, it was clear he was an easy bowler to play on firm pitches. The following year, Townsend's bowling was expensive even on the few rain-affected pitches because he was sacrificing accuracy to gain spin, but his batting developed so much that he attained the status of an all-rounder, scoring a maiden century against Yorkshire and winning a critical match against Nottinghamshire.

In May 1898, Townsend started his season poorly, although his nought for 150 against a powerful Surrey batting side on a soft Oval wicket was affected by several dropped catches. However, in early June after two weeks of rain he took nine for 48 (fifteen for 134 in the match) to defeat Middlesex on a sticky wicket at Lord's, despite bowling many loose balls. In that innings Townsend also took a brilliant running catch to dismiss the tenth man. Although on the hard pitches which ensued in late June and July his bowling was largely harmless, Townsend's skill as a batsman reached far beyond that of previous years and he hit five centuries, including four in six innings. The highest and most skilful was 159 against Lancashire on a wicket where Arthur Mold’s fast bowling kicked up dangerously. When the rain returned in August, Townsend lost his batting, but his bowling was – remarkably – even more irresistible than in 1895. Across five matches he bowled 1,533 balls with 65 maidens, taking 64 wickets for 715 runs and a bowling average of 11.17 runs per wicket.

Townsend was rewarded for these feats with selection as a Wisden Cricketer of the Year, and his jump to the front rank of batsmen continued in the dry summer of 1899, when he made nine centuries, including 224 against Essex. Although his bowling had become expensive even when the pitches helped him, Townsend was chosen for his only Tests against Australia. He did very modestly in these matches, but toured the United States with a team led by K.S. Ranjitsinhji that winter. In 1900, though he only took 57 first-class wickets, Townsend again batted well despite playing no really large innings, showing greater ability than before to counter the spinning ball on treacherous pitches, notably late in the season at Cheltenham.

However, from 1901 Townsend began devoting most of the summer to studying law and later practising as a solicitor. This meant that he could only play a handful of matches each season until 1906. Though he hardly bowled at all in these games, his batting continued to find success. He scored 147 on a fairly difficult pitch against Sussex in 1902, and 214 against Worcestershire in 1906. From 1907 he was appointed as Official Receiver at Stockton-on-Tees and could play only exceptionally rarely (though he would have played in the Cheltenham festival in 1908 but for a strain). Innings of 61 against a formidable Yorkshire attack in his only appearance for 1907, 126 against the Australians in 1909 and 84 (after Gloucestershire at been dismissed for a record low 22 in their first innings) to beat Somerset in 1920 followed. His last appearances in 1921 and 1922 yielded little success, and Townsend was never involved in the game after that.
