= Ted Barratt =

English cricketer (1844–1891)

Ted Barrett
Personal information
- Full name: Edward D'Oyley Barratt
- Born: 21 April 1844; Stockton-on-Tees, County Durham, England
- Died: 27 February 1891 (aged 46); Kennington, London, England
- Batting: Left-handed
- Bowling: Slow left-arm orthodox
- Role: Bowler

Domestic team information
- Years: Team
- 1872: North
- 1872: MCC
- 1876–1885: Surrey
- 1886: CI Thornton's XI

Career statistics
Competition	First-class
Matches	153
Runs scored	1,595
Batting average	8.48
100s/50s	0/1
Top score	67
Balls bowled	32,827
Wickets	790
Bowling average	17.54
5 wickets in innings	69
10 wickets in match	18
Best bowling	10/43
Catches/stumpings	75/–
- Source: CricketArchive, 10 May 2008

Edward D'Oyley Barratt (21 April 1844 – 27 February 1891) was an English cricketer who primarily played for Surrey in a first-class career that lasted from 1872 to 1886. A left-arm slow roundarm bowler with a remarkable capacity for drift, his most famous achievement was taking all ten wickets in an innings for the Players against the Australians in 1878. On three occasions, he took over 100 wickets in a season. His Wisden obituarist wrote of his bowling, "At his best Barratt was certainly a very fine slow bowler, being able on certain wickets to get more work on the ball than almost any other cricketers of his generation."

== Bowling style ==
Standing 5'8" tall and weighing 11 st. 4 lbs, he spun a long way from leg and was especially effective against batsmen reluctant to use their feet. He had a deadly quicker ball, which went on with the arm, but his primary proclivity lay in floating the ball up to the bat, about a foot to the offside, and turning it a few inches away. WG Grace saw many "an impatient or thoughtless batsman 'spooned' in trying to hit"; indeed, even the "good" ones were prone to slashing wildly at it and often fell foul of the extra offside fieldsman that Barratt had in play. Grace gave Barratt little credit: "It was all owing to the eagerness of the batsman, who could not resist the temptation to hit out at everything off the wicket. A little thought would have shown that stepping back and cutting it, instead of hitting it on the rise, was the right way to treat it; or that quickness in running out and hitting before it pitched would have been equally effective." It is a mark of Barratt's respect for Grace and his brother EM that he never bothered with this ruse against them; indeed, he was often completely at their mercy, especially in the case of EM, who habitually destroyed his confidence.

== Playing career season by season ==
A plumber by trade, Barratt's first engagement as a professional cricketer was at the Longsight club in Manchester in 1870 and 1871. He was taken on the Lord's ground staff in 1872 and made his first-class debut that same year with great success, taking 8/60 for the North against the South at Prince's Cricket Ground in a fixture beginning on 16 May. He played twice more that season for North v. South, as well as in four games for Marylebone Cricket Club (MCC), to whom Grace, taking a keen interest in his progress after first encountering him at Swindon, had recommended him. In seven matches, he took 25 wickets at an average of 13.48, with five or more wickets in an innings three times. In spite of this success, his next first-class match was not until 1876.

In 1873, he was employed at Prince's Cricket Ground and, in 1874, moved to the Surrey ground staff. In both 1874 and 1875, he also played for his native Durham. He qualified for Surrey by residence in 1876, and played for them until 1885.

In 13 first-class matches in 1876, he took 36 wickets at an average of 19.38, not particularly good given the generally poor pitches of the time. He had few pretensions as a batsman—although strong on the slog, he had a weak defence—but that season made his highest score of 67, the only time that he reached fifty.

He played in 18 matches in 1877 and was given more bowling, so that he finished with 92 wickets. His average, however was similar to the previous season—20.02.

He did much better in 1878. 20 matches brought him 135 wickets at 14.04. He took five or more wickets in an innings on 15 occasions and five times took 10 or more in a match. He appeared to take a particular liking to the touring Australians. Playing for Surrey against them, he returned innings figures of 8/58, at last improving on the 8/60 he had taken on debut back in 1872. But, later that season, he surpassed this. Appearing for the Players at The Oval, on 2 September he returned innings figures of 10/43. The Australians nevertheless won by eight runs in a low-scoring affair: none of the four innings reached 100. The feat of taking 10 wickets in an innings against an Australian touring side was not repeated until Jim Laker did so twice, once for Surrey and once for England, in 1956.

He lost form in 1879, taking only 10 wickets at 31.50 in seven matches, and never represented the Players again, kept out by the likes of Alfred Shaw and James Southerton. He played only six times the following season, but his figures were much better: 29 wickets at 17.65.

The next four seasons were productive ones. In 1881, 14 matches brought him 82 wickets at 19.57. The following year was slightly better, with 15 matches producing 94 wickets at 16.93. 1883 was his most productive season: 21 matches, 148 wickets at an average of 15.90, with 18 five-wicket innings and six 10-wicket matches. He was not quite so effective in 1884: the same number of matches as the previous year yielded him 121 wickets at 18.17.

1885 proved to be his final season with Surrey. In 10 matches, he managed only 15 wickets at 26.40 and was not selected for any fixtures after the middle of July.

"It was rather hard luck on Barratt," wrote Grace, "that when he represented Surrey the eleven was not only weak, but had very little fast bowling. In many matches he was kept on too long because there was no one good enough to relieve him, and the consequence was that the batsmen got set and hit him. Nothing disheartens a bowler so much; and these circumstances must be taken into consideration in forming an estimate of the good work he did for his county."

Barratt played only one further first-class match after leaving Surrey, turning out in July 1886 for CI Thornton's XI against the Australians. Although he was no longer playing for Surrey, the county granted him a benefit match at The Oval in 1887, the fixture against Yorkshire.

== Later life ==
He occasionally umpired during his playing career as this was part of the duties of senior professionals on the Oval staff. He was one of the umpires used in major matches during 1889 and 1890, standing in seventeen first-class matches.

In January 1889, Barratt became the landlord of the Duchy Arms, a public house not far from The Oval. Two years later, he died there from consumption at the early age of 46 and was buried at West Norwood Cemetery.
