= William Game =

English cricketer and rugby union footballer

Personal information
- Born: 2 October 1853; Stoke Newington, Middlesex, England
- Died: 11 August 1932 (aged 78); Brancaster, Norfolk, England
- Batting: Right-handed
- Bowling: Right-arm slow

Career statistics
Competition	First-class
Matches	59
Runs scored	1,862
Batting average	18.80
100s/50s	2/8
Top score	141
Balls bowled	555
Wickets	5
Bowling average	61.60
5 wickets in innings	0
10 wickets in match	0
Best bowling	1/5
Catches/stumpings	33/–
- Source: CricketArchive, 9 May 2022

William Henry Game (2 October 1853 – 11 August 1932) was a cricketer for Sherborne School, Oxford University and Surrey. He also played rugby union as an outside back for Oxford University in 1873.

Game was a dangerous hard-hitting batsman who had a major weakness in lacking defensive skill – something critical against the shooters prevalent on unrolled pitches when he began playing. He was also a strong-throwing outfield who threw a cricket ball over 127 yards (116 m) at Oxford's Magdalen Ground in 1873. At Sherborne in 1871, Game caused a sensation when he scored 281 against Motcombe in just 270 minutes at a time when this was the fourth highest innings played in any grade of cricket and the first known double century in a public school game. With three other centuries for Sherbourne, Game stepped into an extremely weak Surrey eleven at the end of the season in the hope of reducing their reliance on Jupp and Pooley for runs, but scored only 33 runs in four innings and looked uncomfortable against the speed of Hill and Emmett.

In 1872, Game left Sherborne but was available for only three of Surrey's fifteen first-class matches, and when available he again failed to live up to the promise of his school record, scoring only 58 runs in six innings, but in 1873 he went up to Oriel College, Oxford, and scored 54 against Marylebone Cricket Club (MCC) and 48 at Lord's against Cambridge; however with only 123 runs in seventeen other first-class innings Game clearly had not established himself as a top-class batsman, a fact confirmed during 1874 when he failed to pass thirty in any of his thirteen first-class innings.

1875, however, showed Game give evidence of his ability as a dangerous hitter, averaging 22 – regarded as impressive in a period when shooters had not been eliminated by the heavy roller as they were to be soon afterwards – but it was in 1876 when Game rose to his greatest heights in his last year at Oxford. At the soon to be built on Prince's Cricket Ground, Game hit his highest score of 141 out of the first total of six hundred in first-class cricket and more significantly became the first Oxonian to score a century against Cambridge when he made 109 a week later. Although Game again failed for Surrey with only 23 in three innings (two ducks), the following season he spared time for six of Surrey's fourteen games and achieved an average of 31 in a wet summer, forming with Walter Read and Bunny Lucas a formidable trio of amateur batsmen who rose Surrey to only its second season with more wins than losses since 1865. Game could however spare time from business for only three games in 1878, one against Middlesex in 1879 and none at all in 1880, though he did play several times for the Esher club.

Game did return to the Surrey eleven for two games in late 1881, but disappointed against such bowlers as Peate and Crossland on wickets rendered very difficult by a wet August. However, in 1882, Game showed with innings of 62 against Kent and especially 84 not out against Alfred Shaw and Flowers at their best that he remained a very dangerous hitter. Game averaged 25.75 in nine innings for Surrey that year, but after that business commitments prevented him playing any more county cricket apart from one game in 1883. In his last first-class match, however, Game played an innings of 92 against his old University.
