= 1871 English cricket season =

Cricket season review

The 1871 English cricket season was the eighth since the legalisation of overarm bowling. Derbyshire County Cricket Club became a first-class club and the last matches were played by Cambridgeshire, who in the days of Bob Carpenter, the first Tom Hayward and George Tarrant had been one of the leading cricket counties.

W. G. Grace surpassed his previous season's record of 1,808 runs and his 1869 average of 57.39 by scoring 2,739 at the outstanding average of 78.25 at a time when most pitches were still unrolled and very dangerous to batsmen – though the heavy roller was already producing major improvements to Lord's and eliminating the bottom-of-the-stump shooters. These records were not beaten until Arthur Shrewsbury averaged 78.71 in 1887 and Ranjitsinhji scored 2,780 runs in 1896. (Note: Some eleven-a-side matches played from 1772 to 1863 have been rated "first-class" by certain sources. However, the term only came into common use around 1864, when overarm bowling was legalised. It was formally defined as a standard by a meeting at Lord's, in May 1894, of Marylebone Cricket Club (MCC) and the county clubs which were then competing in the County Championship. The ruling was effective from the beginning of the 1895 season, but pre-1895 matches of the same standard have no official definition of status because the ruling is not retrospective. Matches of a similar standard since the beginning of the 1864 season are generally considered to have an unofficial first-class status. Pre-1864 matches which are included in the ACS' "Important Match Guide" may generally be regarded as top-class or, at least, historically significant. For further information, see First-class cricket.)

== Playing record (by county) ==
County	Played	Won	Lost	Drawn
Cambridgeshire	1	0	0	1
Derbyshire	2	1	1	0
Gloucestershire	4	2	1	1
Kent	6	2	3	1
Lancashire	6	4	2	0
Middlesex	2	1	0	1
Nottinghamshire	6	4	1	1
Surrey	13	0	9	4
Sussex	4	4	0	0
Yorkshire	6	2	3	1
^{[a]}

== Leading batsmen (qualification 15 innings) ==
1871 English season leading batsmen
Name	Team	Matches	Innings	Not outs	Runs	Highest score	Average	100s	50s
WG Grace	Gloucestershire; Marylebone Cricket Club (MCC)	25	39	4	2739	268	78.25	10	9
Richard Daft	Nottinghamshire; All England Eleven	12	19	4	565	92	37.66	0	6
Robert Carpenter	All England Eleven; Cambridgeshire	9	16	4	446	87 not out	37.16	0	3
Fred Grace	Gloucestershire	14	24	4	716	98	35.80	0	6
Walter Hadow	Oxford University; Marylebone Cricket Club (MCC); Middlesex	14	22	2	694	217	34.70	1	4

== Leading bowlers (qualification 800 balls) ==
1871 English season leading bowlers
Name	Team	Balls bowled	Runs conceded	Wickets taken	Average	Best bowling	5 wickets in innings	10 wickets in match
George Freeman	Yorkshire	1060	330	29	11.37	7/30	2	0
Samuel Butler	Oxford University	1136	446	37	12.05	10/38	4	2
Tom Emmett	Yorkshire; All England Eleven	1502	625	50	12.50	8/31	5	3
E. M. Grace	Gloucestershire	930	286	22	13.00	6/36	1	0
Edgar Willsher	Kent	3025	935	70	13.35	7/46	7	2

== Events ==
- Cambridgeshire County Cricket Club played one match in the 1871 season and ceased to be a first-class county thereafter. This was blamed on the reluctance of the leading players in the county to appear for the Cambridgeshire team, preferring to play for the touring elevens.
- In Derbyshire's opening season the club played its initial first-class match v. Lancashire at Old Trafford on 26 and 27 May.
- Middlesex County Cricket Club, after being threatened with disbanding due to lack of a ground, acquired the Lillie Bridge ground in West Brompton as a "home" venue, but played only one match there.
- Prince's Cricket Ground was opened on former market gardens in Chelsea by two brothers dissatisfied with the condition of the Lord's pitch – ironically Lord's improved markedly this very season. Prince's was a major ground in the middle 1870s but was built-on between 1877 and 1886.
- 28 June: William Game, with 281 for Sherborne against Motcombe, hit the first double century in a public school game
- W. G. Grace caused a sensation by scoring 2,739 runs – this being the first time 2,000 was exceeded. He was to repeat the feat in 1876 and 1887, but no other player was to equal Grace until Andrew Stoddart and William Gunn did so in 1893. Grace's dominance is shown by comparing his figures for the season with the next best. Richard Daft had the next highest average among batsmen playing 10 innings or more, with 37.66, less than half Grace's figure. Harry Jupp had the next highest runs aggregate, with 1068.
- With ten centuries, Grace beat his 1869 record of six in one season. This was not equalled until Ranjitsinhji in 1896 and beaten by Ranji in 1900. No other batsman made more than a single hundred.
- Surrey played thirteen county games without a single win, an ignominy not surpassed until Derbyshire in 1897 played sixteen winless games. Surrey were not to fail to win a single county game again until 2008.

== Labels ==
^{a} Hampshire, though regarded until 1885 as first-class, played no inter-county matches between 1868 and 1869 or 1871 and 1874

== Bibliography ==
- ACS (1981). A Guide to Important Cricket Matches Played in the British Isles 1709–1863. Nottingham: ACS. OCLC 85045528.
- ACS (1982). A Guide to First-class Cricket Matches Played in the British Isles. Nottingham: ACS. OCLC 10586869.
- Warner, Pelham (1946). Lords: 1787–1945. London: Harrap. OCLC 877106024.

== Annual reviews ==
- John Lillywhite's Cricketer's Companion (Green Lilly), Lillywhite, 1872
- James Lillywhite's Cricketers' Annual (Red Lilly), Lillywhite, 1872
- Wisden Cricketers' Almanack, 1872
