= David Buchanan (cricketer) =

English cricketer (1830–1900)

Personal information
- Born: 16 January 1830; Edinburgh, Midlothian, Scotland
- Died: 30 May 1900 (aged 70); Rugby, Warwickshire, England
- Batting: Left-handed
- Bowling: Left-arm slow-medium Left-arm fast

Career statistics
Competition	First-class
Matches	62
Runs scored	257
Batting average	3.83
100s/50s	0/0
Top score	27
Balls bowled	15,611
Wickets	408
Bowling average	15.92
5 wickets in innings	40
10 wickets in match	11
Best bowling	9/82
Catches/stumpings	17/0
- Source: CricketArchive, 21 August 2019

David Buchanan (16 January 1830 – 30 May 1900) was an English amateur cricketer who played mainly as a bowler and who had two careers separated in an unusual manner by a long period out of the first-class game. He was born at Edinburgh, Midlothian, Scotland, and died at Rugby, Warwickshire, England.

== Biography ==
Buchanan, despite his very short stature (compared by a later review to Tich Freeman) played as a round-arm fast bowler, for Rugby and Cambridge University, where he was at Clare College, but his results were considered unsatisfactory and his quickly-acquired reputation among the historically worst “rabbits” with the bat caused him to be dropped before the 1851 University match.

For the following twelve years, Buchanan worked as secretary and treasurer of the Rugby Club and bowled with moderate success in club cricket until an unusual incident at Old Trafford (then a new ground) caused him to develop the spin bowling that gave him, like contemporary professional James Southerton, belated fame. Buchanan was captaining Rugby against Manchester and the two stock Rugby "trundlers" were failing to beat batsmen which was normal with unrolled pitches and frequent shooters, so Buchanan tried bowling spinners and rapidly caused the dismissal of his opponents. In the few following years, Buchanan developed the art of his slow-medium spinners with such dedication that by 1867 when playing for Southgate club – so strong as to be regarded as first-class – Buchanan was too much for Oxford University with an analysis of fourteen for 126, whilst for Gentlemen of the North he took six for 99 against Gentlemen of the South.

It was in 1868, however, that Buchanan's spin bowling achieved genuine fame, as on an Oval wicket invariably the best in the country before the heavy roller, Buchanan took nine for 82 in the Players’ second innings as his pitched-up slow-medium balls spun out batsmen with the skill of Jupp, Charlwood and Pooley. By this time, Buchanan had a delivery described by a critic as a “high round-arm trundle” and it was said that his sharply spun balls wide of the off-stump could tempt batsmen on wickets free of shooters in a manner that the previously orthodox straight, shortish and fast bowling could never do – with the result that the best professional batsmen constantly fell before Buchanan.

The following year, Buchanan was not quite so successful but still his eight wickets were critical to a seventeen run Gentlemen victory in a match totalling 915 runs. In 1870, he played no first-class cricket after May but the following season Buchanan took seventeen wickets in three innings and won the Gentlemen another game at the Oval, before going one wicket better at Lord's in 1872 and taking a total of twenty wickets for 225 runs in two innings wins in 1873. During this period Buchanan was clearly the best amateur bowler in the game, and after W. G. Grace’s incomparable batting was the most important factor behind the Gentlemen's dominance of the Players. Although the Players broke a sequence of Gentlemen wins at Lord's in 1874, Buchanan with seven wickets in each match took his total for ten games in six seasons to eighty-seven wickets for 14.88 – to illustrate how bad his batting was Buchanan scored only sixteen runs in those games!

1875, however, saw Buchanan bowl so poorly in the annual matches against Oxford and Cambridge that he was omitted from the Gentlemen's eleven – never to be selected again even when he recovered form somewhat in the corresponding games of 1876. Buchanan was never the same bowler as between 1867 and 1874, but he was still though good enough to receive an invitation to tour Australia with Lord Harris‘ team for the 1878–79 tour. Buchanan declined, feeling that at forty-eight he would not be equal to a tour in the hot Australian climate.

However, from 1877 onwards Buchanan, as a resident in Rugby, played a critical role in the establishment of a Warwickshire County Club, which was officially founded in its present form for the 1882 season. Buchanan was at this stage fifty-two, but captained the club's for its initial four years with considerable success and continued as treasurer of the club until 1889. By this time Warwickshire was well on the way to achieving the status of a first-class team with players like Henry Pallett, the Quaife brothers, Dick Lilley and Ludford Docker.

During the rest of his life Buchanan continued as treasurer to the Rugby club and wrote extensively about the spin bowling he had developed in his thirties, with his major work being "Hints on Slow Bowling" (1894). Around that time he also wrote a book about the rise of the Warwickshire County Club as it was becoming first-class.

== Family ==
David Buchanan married Anna Wyndham Penruddocke on 29 September 1853 in St. Peter, Milton Lilbourne, Wiltshire
Children of David Buchanan & Anna Wyndham Penruddocke

- Annie Letitia Buchanan b: 1854
- Adeline Wyndham Buchanan b: 1855
- Helen Rokeby Buchanan b: 1857
- John Penruddock Buchanan b: 1864
- David Penruddocke Buchanan b: 1866 d: 1866
- Gertrude L Buchanan b: 1866
- Margaret Henrietta Buchanan b: 1869
- Jessie Lowther Buchanan b: 1872
- Florence Beresford Buchanan b: 1874
- George Penruddocke Buchanan b: 1877
