= Alfred Brooks (cricketer) =

English cricketer

Personal information
- Full name: Alfred James Brooks
- Born: 24 March 1846; Sutton-in-Ashfield, Nottinghamshire, England
- Died: 20 November 1911 (aged 65); Sutton-in-Ashfield, Nottinghamshire, England
- Batting: Right-handed
- Bowling: Right-arm fast-medium

Domestic team information
- Years: Team
- 1877: Nottinghamshire

Career statistics
Competition	First-class
Matches	2
Runs scored	10
Batting average	3.33
100s/50s	–/–
Top score	6
Balls bowled	282
Wickets	5
Bowling average	17.00
5 wickets in innings	–
10 wickets in match	–
Best bowling	2/10
Catches/stumpings	–/–
- Source: Cricinfo, 20 May 2012

Alfred James Brooks (24 March 1846 – 20 November 1911) was an English cricketer. Brooks was a right-handed batsman who bowled right-arm fast-medium. He was born at Sutton-in-Ashfield, Nottinghamshire.

Brooks made two first-class appearances for Nottinghamshire in 1877, both against Surrey. In his first match at Trent Bridge, Nottinghamshire won the toss and elected to bat first, making 150 all out, with Brooks scoring 6 runs before he was dismissed by James Southerton. In response, Surrey made 103 all out in their first-innings, with Brooks taking the wickets of George Elliott and Allen Chandler to finish with figures of 2/10 from twelve overs. Responding in their second-innings, Nottinghamshire made 120 all out, with Brooks being dismissed for 3 runs by George Strachan. In their second-innings, Surrey made 149 all out, with Brooks taking the wickets of Harry Jupp and Chandler, to finish with figures of 2/30 from 26.1 overs. Nottinghamshire won the match by 18 runs. In the return fixture at The Oval, Surrey won the toss and elected to bat, making 250 all out in their first-innings, during which Brooks took the wicket of George Jones to finish with figures of 1/45 from 32.1 overs. Nottinghamshire could then only manage just 97 all out in their first-innings, with him ending the innings not out on 1. Forced to follow-on in their second-innings, Nottinghamshire were dismissed for 247, with Brooks himself dismissed for a duck by Ted Barratt. Requiring 95 for victory, Surrey reached their target with three wickets to spare.

He died at the town of his birth on 20 November 1911.
