= Allen Chandler =

English cricketer

Cricket information
- Batting: Right-handed

Career statistics
Competition	First-class
Matches	29
Runs scored	716
Batting average	14.61
100s/50s	0/3
Top score	74
Catches/stumpings	17/0
- Source: CricketArchive, 3 June 2023

Allen Chandler (5 December 1849 – 25 December 1926) was a batsman for Surrey in the 1870s. He was born at Kensington in London in 1849.

Chandler played 29 first-class matches between 1873 and 1877, scoring a total of 716 runs. He recorded his highest score of 74 against Cambridge University at The Oval in 1875. He captained the Surrey team during the 1876 season.

Chandler died at Haslemere in Surrey in 1926. He was aged 77.
