= James Cranston =

English cricketer

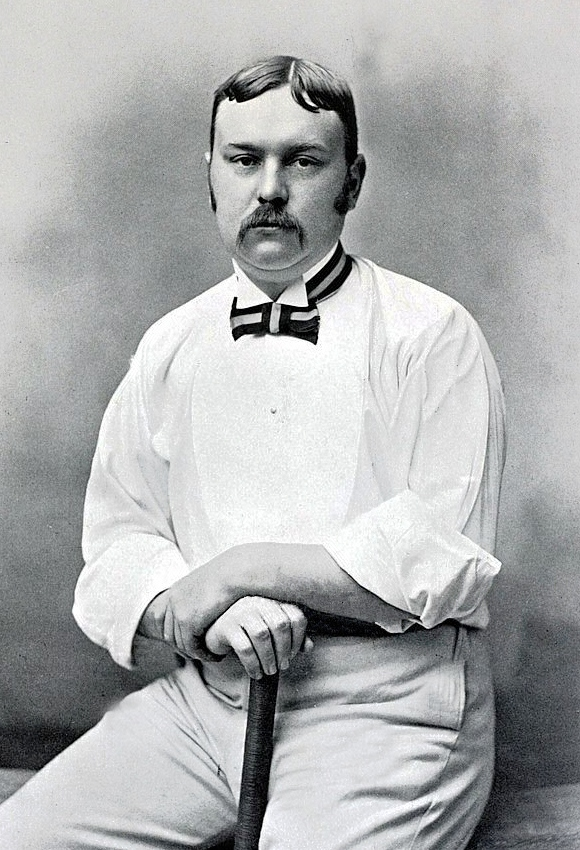

Personal information
- Born: 9 January 1859; Bordesley, Birmingham
- Died: 10 December 1904 (aged 45); Bristol, England
- Batting: Left-handed
- Bowling: Left-arm

International information
- National side: England
- Only Test: 11 August 1890 v Australia

Career statistics
Competition	Test	First-class
Matches	1	118
Runs scored	31	3,450
Batting average	15.50	19.71
100s/50s	0/0	5/14
Top score	16	152
Catches/stumpings	1/0	49/0
- Source: CricketArchive, 16 August 2022

James Cranston (9 January 1859 – 10 December 1904) was an amateur cricketer who was educated at Taunton College in Somerset and went on to play 103 first-class cricket matches for Gloucestershire County Cricket Club between 1876 and 1899 as a left-handed middle-order batsman. He also played for Warwickshire County Cricket Club in 1886 and 1887, which was before Warwickshire gained first-class status. He also played one Test match for England against Australia in 1890.

Although he only played in that one Test, at the Oval at the end of the 1890 season, it was a low-scoring match, and his innings were important in England's two wicket victory, which saw them win the Ashes. Wisden Cricketers' Almanack said of his innings that "his defence under very trying conditions against the bowling of Turner and Ferris was masterly". Cranston played no more Test cricket, and his career all but came to an end a year later after suffering a fit whilst playing the game, although he was able to return briefly eight years later.
