= International cricket in 1884–85 =

International cricket season

The 1884–85 international cricket season was from September 1884 to March 1885. The tour was generally known as Alfred Shaw's XI after its main organiser.

== Season overview ==
International tours
Start date	Home team	Away team	Results [Matches]			
Start date	Home team	Away team	Test	ODI	FC	LA
12 December 1884	Australia	England	2–3 [5]	—	—	—

== January ==
=== England in Australia ===
The Ashes Test match series
No.	Date	Home captain	Away captain	Venue	Result
Test 17	12–16 December	Billy Murdoch	Arthur Shrewsbury	Adelaide Oval, Adelaide	England by 8 wickets
Test 18	1–5 January	Tom Horan	Arthur Shrewsbury	Melbourne Cricket Ground, Melbourne	England by 10 wickets
Test 19	20–24 February	Hugh Massie	Arthur Shrewsbury	Sydney Cricket Ground, Sydney	Australia by 6 runs
Test 20	14–17 March	Jack Blackham	Arthur Shrewsbury	Sydney Cricket Ground, Sydney	Australia by 8 wickets
Test 21	21–25 March	Tom Horan	Arthur Shrewsbury	Melbourne Cricket Ground, Melbourne	England by an innings and 98 runs
