= 1872 English cricket season =

Cricket season review

The 1872 English cricket season was the ninth since the legalisation of overarm bowling.

The first experiment in pitch covering was carried out. Prince's Cricket Ground opened in Chelsea, London. (Note: Some eleven-a-side matches played from 1772 to 1863 have been rated "first-class" by certain sources. However, the term only came into common use around 1864, when overarm bowling was legalised. It was formally defined as a standard by a meeting at Lord's, in May 1894, of Marylebone Cricket Club (MCC) and the county clubs which were then competing in the County Championship. The ruling was effective from the beginning of the 1895 season, but pre-1895 matches of the same standard have no official definition of status because the ruling is not retrospective. Matches of a similar standard since the beginning of the 1864 season are generally considered to have an unofficial first-class status. Pre-1864 matches which are included in the ACS' "Important Match Guide" may generally be regarded as top-class or, at least, historically significant. For further information, see First-class cricket.)

== Playing record (by county) ==
County	Played	Won	Lost	Drawn
Derbyshire	2	0	2	0
Gloucestershire	7	3	1	3
Kent	4	0	4	0
Lancashire	4	4	0	0
Middlesex	3	0	3	0
Nottinghamshire^{[a]}	7	2	0	5
Surrey	12	7	3	2
Sussex	6	3	2	1
Yorkshire^{[a]}	9	2	6	1
^{[b]}

== Leading batsmen (qualification 15 innings) ==
1872 English season leading batsmen
Name	Team	Matches	Innings	Not outs	Runs	Highest score	Average	100s	50s
WG Grace	Gloucestershire; Marylebone Cricket Club (MCC)	20	32	7	1485	170 not out	57.11	6	6
Richard Daft	Nottinghamshire	13	20	3	589	102	34.64	1	4
William Yardley	Cambridge University; Marylebone Cricket Club (MCC)	11	19	3	529	130	33.06	1	2
Henry Charlwood	Sussex	16	27	4	651	80	28.30	0	5
Frederick Fryer	Cambridge University	9	15	0	405	91	27.00	0	3

== Leading bowlers (qualification 800 balls) ==
1872 English season leading bowlers
Name	Team	Balls bowled	Runs conceded	Wickets taken	Average	Best bowling	5 wickets in innings	10 wickets in match
William McIntyre	Lancashire	857	232	41	5.65	7/23	7	3
George Wootton	Marylebone Cricket Club (MCC)	1239	359	37	9.70	7/14	5	2
David Buchanan	Gentlemen	1210	374	35	10.68	7/78	4	1
Arthur Ridley	Oxford University	844	332	31	10.70	6/23	3	0
George Howitt	Marylebone Cricket Club (MCC); Middlesex	1238	427	38	11.23	6/36	4	0

== Events ==
- An experiment took place at Lord's to study the effects of covering the pitch before the start of a match, the first time this is known to have been tried. Unlike the recently introduced heavy roller which became universally used by 1880 and produced significant changes in the game by eliminating previously ubiquitous shooters, covering was for a long time severely rejected in England: it was the wet summer of 1924 before covering as regular practice was even considered and 1959 before it was considered "acceptable".
- 14 May: Marylebone Cricket Club (MCC) lose seven wickets before their first run is scored on a sticky wicket at Lord's against James Southerton and William Marten of Surrey. Their ninth wicket falls at 8 - which would have been the lowest score in an important match for sixty-two years - but the last wicket doubles the score
- Prince's Cricket Ground hosted its first first-class match being between North and South on 16 May. Before being built on, it was generally praised for its wickets and the scenery surrounding the ground.

== Labels ==
^{a} Nottinghamshire and Yorkshire played a third match at the short-lived Prince's Cricket Ground, Chelsea
^{b} Hampshire, though regarded until 1885 as first-class, played no inter-county matches between 1868 and 1869 or 1871 and 1874

== Bibliography ==
- ACS (1981). A Guide to Important Cricket Matches Played in the British Isles 1709–1863. Nottingham: ACS. OCLC 85045528.
- ACS (1982). A Guide to First-class Cricket Matches Played in the British Isles. Nottingham: ACS. OCLC 10586869.
- Warner, Pelham (1946). Lords: 1787–1945. London: Harrap. OCLC 877106024.

== Annual reviews ==
- John Lillywhite's Cricketer's Companion (Green Lilly), Lillywhite, 1873
- James Lillywhite's Cricketers' Annual (Red Lilly), Lillywhite, 1873
- Wisden Cricketers' Almanack, 1873
