= 1880 English cricket season =

Cricket season review

The 1880 English cricket season was the 17th since the legalisation of overarm bowling. The second tour by a representative Australian team was undertaken and they took part in the (retrospective) first Test match to be played in England. County cricket was dominated by the Nottinghamshire bowlers Alfred Shaw and Fred Morley. (Note: Some eleven-a-side matches played from 1772 to 1863 have been rated "first-class" by certain sources. However, the term only came into common use around 1864, when overarm bowling was legalised. It was formally defined as a standard by a meeting at Lord's, in May 1894, of Marylebone Cricket Club (MCC) and the county clubs which were then competing in the County Championship. The ruling was effective from the beginning of the 1895 season, but pre-1895 matches of the same standard have no official definition of status because the ruling is not retrospective. Matches of a similar standard since the beginning of the 1864 season are generally considered to have an unofficial first-class status. Pre-1864 matches which are included in the ACS' "Important Match Guide" may generally be regarded as top-class or, at least, historically significant. For further information, see First-class cricket.)

== Champion County ==
^{[a]}

- Nottinghamshire

=== Playing record (by county) ===
| County | Played | Won | Lost | Drawn |
|---|---|---|---|---|
| Derbyshire | 8 | 2 | 5 | 1 |
| Gloucestershire | 10 | 4 | 1 | 5 |
| Hampshire | 2 | 0 | 2 | 0 |
| Kent | 10 | 5 | 3 | 2 |
| Lancashire | 12 | 6 | 3 | 3 |
| Middlesex | 8 | 2 | 4 | 2 |
| Nottinghamshire | 10 | 6 | 1 | 3 |
| Surrey | 14 | 2 | 7 | 5 |
| Sussex | 8 | 2 | 4 | 2 |
| Yorkshire | 14 | 5 | 4 | 5 |

== Leading batsmen (qualification 20 innings) ==
1880 English season leading batsmen
| Name | Team(s) | Matches | Innings | Not outs | Runs | Highest score | Average | 100s | 50s |
|---|---|---|---|---|---|---|---|---|---|
| WG Grace | Gloucestershire; England | 16 | 27 | 3 | 951 | 152 | 39.62 | 2 | 5 |
| Lord Harris | Kent; Marylebone Cricket Club (MCC); England | 16 | 26 | 2 | 772 | 123 | 32.16 | 1 | 5 |
| Alexander Webbe | Middlesex; England | 14 | 24 | 1 | 708 | 142 | 30.78 | 1 | 2 |
| Ivo Bligh | Cambridge University; Kent | 21 | 38 | 5 | 1013 | 105 | 30.69 | 1 | 8 |
| Billy Barnes | Nottinghamshire; Marylebone Cricket Club (MCC); England | 28 | 47 | 4 | 1220 | 143 | 28.37 | 2 | 5 |

== Leading bowlers (qualification 1,000 balls) ==
1880 English season leading bowlers
| Name | Team | Balls bowled | Runs conceded | Wickets taken | Average | Best bowling | 5 wickets in innings | 10 wickets in match |
|---|---|---|---|---|---|---|---|---|
| Alfred Shaw | Nottinghamshire; Marylebone Cricket Club (MCC); England | 8532 | 1589 | 186 | 8.54 | 8/31 | 14 | 5 |
| Frederick Jellicoe | Oxford University; Hampshire | 1045 | 301 | 32 | 9.40 | 7/23 | 3 | 1 |
| George Nash | Lancashire | 1501 | 471 | 49 | 9.61 | 8/31 | 4 | 2 |
| Arnold Rylott | Marylebone Cricket Club (MCC) | 1162 | 394 | 39 | 10.10 | 7/43 | 6 | 1 |
| Dick Barlow | Lancashire | 2439 | 639 | 62 | 10.30 | 7/16 | 4 | 1 |

== Notable events ==
- The first Test match in England was played at The Oval from 6 to 8 September and England won by five wickets.
- Alfred Shaw achieved the lowest-ever average by any bowler taking over 100 first-class wickets. No bowler has had a single-figure average for over 100 wickets since.

== Labels ==
^{a} An unofficial seasonal title sometimes proclaimed by consensus of media and historians prior to December 1889 when the official County Championship was constituted. Although there are ante-dated claims prior to 1873, when residence qualifications were introduced, it is only since that ruling that any quasi-official status can be ascribed.

== Bibliography ==
- ACS (1981). A Guide to Important Cricket Matches Played in the British Isles 1709–1863. Nottingham: ACS. OCLC 85045528.
- ACS (1982). A Guide to First-class Cricket Matches Played in the British Isles. Nottingham: ACS. OCLC 10586869.
- Warner, Pelham (1946). Lords: 1787–1945. London: Harrap. OCLC 877106024.

== Annual reviews ==
- John Lillywhite's Cricketer's Companion (Green Lilly), Lillywhite, 1881
- James Lillywhite's Cricketers' Annual (Red Lilly), Lillywhite, 1881
- Wisden Cricketers' Almanack, 1881
