= 1885 English cricket season =

Cricket season review

The 1885 English cricket season was the 22nd since the legalisation of overarm bowling. It was the third in succession in which Nottinghamshire was proclaimed the champion county. (Note: Some eleven-a-side matches played from 1772 to 1863 have been rated "first-class" by certain sources. However, the term only came into common use around 1864, when overarm bowling was legalised. It was formally defined as a standard by a meeting at Lord's, in May 1894, of Marylebone Cricket Club (MCC) and the county clubs which were then competing in the County Championship. The ruling was effective from the beginning of the 1895 season, but pre-1895 matches of the same standard have no official definition of status because the ruling is not retrospective. Matches of a similar standard since the beginning of the 1864 season are generally considered to have an unofficial first-class status. Pre-1864 matches which are included in the ACS' "Important Match Guide" may generally be regarded as top-class or, at least, historically significant. For further information, see First-class cricket.)

== Champion County ==
^{[a]}

- Nottinghamshire

== Playing record (by county) ==
County	Played	Won	Lost	Drawn
Derbyshire	9	3	4	2
Gloucestershire	14	6	7	1
Hampshire	10	2	8	0
Kent	11^{[b]}	6	3	2
Lancashire	11^{[b]}	6	3	2
Middlesex	10	2	7	1
Nottinghamshire	12	6	1	5
Somerset	6	1	5	0
Surrey	20	12	4	4
Sussex	14	3	9	2
Yorkshire	16	7	2	7

=== Leading batsmen (qualification 20 innings) ===
1885 English season
Name	Team	Matches	Innings	Not outs	Runs	Highest score	Average	100s	50s
Arthur Shrewsbury	Nottinghamshire	16	24	4	1130	224 not out	56.50	4	3
Walter Read	Surrey	27	42	0	1880	163	44.76	6	9
WG Grace	Gloucestershire	25	42	3	1688	221 not out	43.28	4	10
William Gunn	Nottinghamshire; Marylebone Cricket Club (MCC)	27	43	3	1451	203	36.27	1	9
Maurice Read	Surrey	24	35	2	1137	186 not out	34.45	1	6

=== Leading bowlers (qualification 1,000 balls) ===
1885 English season
Name	Team	Balls bowled	Runs conceded	Wickets taken	Average	Best bowling	5 wickets in innings	10 wickets in match
Johnny Briggs	Lancashire	2596	921	67	13.74	9/29	8	2
William Attewell	Nottinghamshire; Marylebone Cricket Club (MCC)	5204	1218	87	14.00	6/27	6	1
George Lohmann	Surrey	5069	2037	142	14.34	8/18	9	3
Alec Hearne	Kent	2574	928	64	14.50	8/35	4	1
William Roller	Surrey	1666	537	37	14.51	5/34	1	0

== Notable events ==
- 1 June – Kent captain Lord Harris writes a letter to Lancashire concerning the "unfair" bowling of Nash and Crossland and decides not to play Lancashire unless they refrain from employing those two bowlers – the refusal is maintained even when the pair drop out.
- On 17 July, Johnny Briggs and Dick Pilling playing for Lancashire against Surrey set a record stand for the tenth wicket of 173, which stands until 1899.

== Labels ==
^{a} An unofficial seasonal title sometimes proclaimed by consensus of media and historians prior to December 1889 when the official County Championship was constituted. Although there are ante-dated claims prior to 1873, when residence qualifications were introduced, it is only since that ruling that any quasi-official status can be ascribed.
^{b} The return match between Kent and Lancashire was cancelled because Lord Harris objected to the bowling of two Lancashire players

== Bibliography ==
- ACS (1981). A Guide to Important Cricket Matches Played in the British Isles 1709–1863. Nottingham: ACS. OCLC 85045528.
- ACS (1982). A Guide to First-class Cricket Matches Played in the British Isles. Nottingham: ACS. OCLC 10586869.
- Warner, Pelham (1946). Lords: 1787–1945. London: Harrap. OCLC 877106024.

== Annual reviews ==
- James Lillywhite's Cricketers' Annual (Red Lilly), Lillywhite, 1887
- Wisden Cricketers' Almanack, 1887
