= 1884 English cricket season =

Cricket season review

The 1884 English cricket season was the 21st since the legalisation of overarm bowling. Australia toured England to compete for the Ashes. It was the seventh test series between the two teams. Fred Spofforth, an overseas bowler, took the most wickets, but England avenged its loss to the touring Australians in 1882 winning 1 test to 0. (Note: Some eleven-a-side matches played from 1772 to 1863 have been rated "first-class" by certain sources. However, the term only came into common use around 1864, when overarm bowling was legalised. It was formally defined as a standard by a meeting at Lord's, in May 1894, of Marylebone Cricket Club (MCC) and the county clubs which were then competing in the County Championship. The ruling was effective from the beginning of the 1895 season, but pre-1895 matches of the same standard have no official definition of status because the ruling is not retrospective. Matches of a similar standard since the beginning of the 1864 season are generally considered to have an unofficial first-class status. Pre-1864 matches which are included in the ACS' "Important Match Guide" may generally be regarded as top-class or, at least, historically significant. For further information, see First-class cricket.)

== Ashes tour ==
Cumulative record - Test wins	1876–1884
England	5
Australia	7
Drawn	4

== Champion County ==
^{[a]}

- Nottinghamshire

=== Playing record (by county) ===
County	Played	Won	Lost	Drawn
Derbyshire	10	0	10	0
Gloucestershire	12	1	8	3^{[b]}
Hampshire	8	2	6	0
Kent	16	7	7	2
Lancashire	12	7	4	1^{[b]}
Middlesex	10	4	3	3
Nottinghamshire	10	9	0	1
Somerset	6	1	5	0
Surrey	18	9	4	5
Sussex	14	8	5	1
Yorkshire	16	8	4	4

Derbyshire's ignominy of losing every game has been repeated since in county cricket only by the same club in 1920.

== Leading batsmen (qualification 20 innings) ==
1884 English season leading batsmen
Name	Team	Matches	Innings	Not outs	Runs	Highest score	Average	100s	50s
Allan Steel	Lancashire; England; Marylebone Cricket Club (MCC)	16	28	3	967	148	38.68	2	2
William Scotton	Nottinghamshire; England; Marylebone Cricket Club (MCC)	19	31	5	897	134	34.50	2	3
WG Grace	Gloucestershire; England; Marylebone Cricket Club (MCC)	26	45	5	1361	116	34.02	3	2
Lord Harris	Kent; England; Marylebone Cricket Club (MCC)	25	47	5	1417	112 not out	33.73	3	6
Billy Newham	Sussex	12	23	0	741	137	32.21	2	5

== Leading bowlers (qualification 1,000 balls) ==
1884 English season leading bowlers
Name	Team	Balls bowled	Runs conceded	Wickets taken	Average	Best bowling	5 wickets in innings	10 wickets in match
Alfred Shaw	Nottinghamshire	2968	744	71	10.47	8/28	7	2
Tom Emmett	Yorkshire; England	4128	1250	107	11.68	8/32	10	3
William Attewell	Nottinghamshire	4600	1217	101	12.04	8/22	8	3
John Crossland	Lancashire	2100	893	71	12.57	7/35	6	3
Fred Spofforth	Australians	6308	2654	207	12.82	8/62	22	10

== Notable events ==
- 31 July and 1 August: Alfred Shaw achieved the notable feat of doing the hat-trick in each innings against Gloucestershire.

== Labels ==
^{a} An unofficial seasonal title sometimes proclaimed by consensus of media and historians prior to December 1889 when the official County Championship was constituted. Although there are ante-dated claims prior to 1873, when residence qualifications were introduced, it is only since that ruling that any quasi-official status can be ascribed.
^{b} The match between Lancashire and Gloucestershire scheduled for 24 to 26 July was abandoned on the announcement of the death of Mrs Grace, mother of WG and EM Grace. It is shown as a draw.

== Bibliography ==
- ACS (1981). A Guide to Important Cricket Matches Played in the British Isles 1709–1863. Nottingham: ACS. OCLC 85045528.
- ACS (1982). A Guide to First-class Cricket Matches Played in the British Isles. Nottingham: ACS. OCLC 10586869.
- Warner, Pelham (1946). Lords: 1787–1945. London: Harrap. OCLC 877106024.

== Annual reviews ==
- John Lillywhite's Cricketer's Companion (Green Lilly), Lillywhite, 1885
- James Lillywhite's Cricketers' Annual (Red Lilly), Lillywhite, 1885
- Wisden Cricketers' Almanack, 1885
