= 1881 English cricket season =

Cricket season review

The 1881 English cricket season was the 18th since the legalisation of overarm bowling. There was a first outright title win by Lancashire and a strike by the Nottinghamshire professionals, led by their main bowler Alfred Shaw, over benefits and terms. (Note: Some eleven-a-side matches played from 1772 to 1863 have been rated "first-class" by certain sources. However, the term only came into common use around 1864, when overarm bowling was legalised. It was formally defined as a standard by a meeting at Lord's, in May 1894, of Marylebone Cricket Club (MCC) and the county clubs which were then competing in the County Championship. The ruling was effective from the beginning of the 1895 season, but pre-1895 matches of the same standard have no official definition of status because the ruling is not retrospective. Matches of a similar standard since the beginning of the 1864 season are generally considered to have an unofficial first-class status. Pre-1864 matches which are included in the ACS' "Important Match Guide" may generally be regarded as top-class or, at least, historically significant. For further information, see First-class cricket.)

== Champion County ==
^{[a]}

- Lancashire

=== Playing record (by county) ===
County	Played	Won	Lost	Drawn
Derbyshire	8	2	5	1
Gloucestershire	10	4	2	4
Hampshire	2	0	2	0
Kent	10	3	7	0
Lancashire	13^{[b]}	10	0	3
Middlesex	9^{[b]}	3	3	3
Nottinghamshire	12	4	4	4
Surrey	14	4	9	1
Sussex	12	3	8	1
Yorkshire	16	10	3	3

== Leading batsmen (qualification 20 innings) ==
1881 English season leading batsmen
Name	Team	Matches	Innings	Not outs	Runs	Highest score	Average	100s	50s
A. N. Hornby	Lancashire; Marylebone Cricket Club (MCC)	25	38	0	1534	188	40.36	3	7
W. G. Grace	Gloucestershire	13	22	1	792	182	37.71	2	4
Charles Leslie	Oxford University; Middlesex	13	23	2	741	111 not out	35.28	2	5
George Ulyett	Yorkshire	24	40	2	1243	112	32.71	1	9
Walter Read	Surrey	16	30	1	931	160	32.10	1	6

== Leading bowlers (qualification 1,000 balls) ==
1881 English season leading bowlers
Name	Team	Balls bowled	Runs conceded	Wickets taken	Average	Best bowling	5 wickets in innings	10 wickets in match
Allen Hill	Yorkshire	1345	437	43	10.16	6/18	2	0
George Nash	Lancashire	1826	557	52	10.71	7/22	4	1
Alec Watson	Lancashire	3504	816	69	11.82	7/37	5	2
Dick Barlow	Lancashire	2988	940	79	11.89	8/29	5	2
Tom Emmett	Yorkshire	2438	919	76	12.09	8/22	6	1

== Nottinghamshire strike ==
Nottinghamshire's professionals, led by Alfred Shaw, held a strike over playing contracts agreed by the MCC and secretary Captain Henry Holden. The players demanded security of contract for all games during the season and the right to organise their own terms rather than those set by the MCC, which during the 1870s as county cricket grew established a strong grip on terms for professional players.

The dispute meant that seven of Nottinghamshire's top players did not play for the first half of the season, and leading batsman Arthur Shrewsbury played only three first-class games all year. Shaw and Shrewsbury used the dispute to organise an eight-month tour of Australia and New Zealand during the winter.

== Notable events ==
- The scheduled 18 to 20 July county match between Lancashire and Middlesex was cancelled because Harrow Wanderers booked Lord's ground and no alternative arrangement could be made to play the game.
- Frederick Randon Sr was struck by a delivery that resulted in his death two years later in 1883.

== See also ==
- Derbyshire County Cricket Club in 1881

== Labels ==
^{a} An unofficial seasonal title sometimes proclaimed by consensus of media and historians prior to December 1889 when the official County Championship was constituted. Although there are ante-dated claims prior to 1873, when residence qualifications were introduced, it is only since that ruling that any quasi-official status can be ascribed.
^{b} The match between Middlesex and Lancashire at Lord's was cancelled because Harrow Wanderers had booked the ground on the same day.

== Bibliography ==
- ACS (1981). A Guide to Important Cricket Matches Played in the British Isles 1709–1863. Nottingham: ACS. OCLC 85045528.
- ACS (1982). A Guide to First-class Cricket Matches Played in the British Isles. Nottingham: ACS. OCLC 10586869.
- Warner, Pelham (1946). Lords: 1787–1945. London: Harrap. OCLC 877106024.

== Annual reviews ==
- John Lillywhite's Cricketer's Companion (Green Lilly), Lillywhite, 1882
- James Lillywhite's Cricketers' Annual (Red Lilly), Lillywhite, 1882
- Wisden Cricketers' Almanack, 1882
