= 1877 English cricket season =

Cricket season review

The 1877 English cricket season was the 14th since the legalisation of overarm bowling. (Note: Some eleven-a-side matches played from 1772 to 1863 have been rated "first-class" by certain sources. However, the term only came into common use around 1864, when overarm bowling was legalised. It was formally defined as a standard by a meeting at Lord's, in May 1894, of Marylebone Cricket Club (MCC) and the county clubs which were then competing in the County Championship. The ruling was effective from the beginning of the 1895 season, but pre-1895 matches of the same standard have no official definition of status because the ruling is not retrospective. Matches of a similar standard since the beginning of the 1864 season are generally considered to have an unofficial first-class status. Pre-1864 matches which are included in the ACS' "Important Match Guide" may generally be regarded as top-class or, at least, historically significant. For further information, see First-class cricket.)

== Champion County ==
^{[a]}

- Gloucestershire

=== Playing record (by county) ===
County	Played	Won	Lost	Drawn
Derbyshire	8	5	2	1
Gloucestershire	8	7	0	1
Hampshire	4	0	4	0
Kent	12	7	4	1
Lancashire	10	6	4	0
Middlesex	6	0	4	2
Nottinghamshire	12	5	5	2
Surrey	12	6	3	3
Sussex	8	0	7	1
Yorkshire	12	2	5	5

== Leading batsmen (qualification 20 innings) ==
1877 English season leading batsmen
Name	Team	Matches	Innings	Not outs	Runs	Highest score	Average	100s	50s
W. G. Grace	Gloucestershire; Marylebone Cricket Club (MCC)	24	40	3	1477	261	39.83	2	9
Bunny Lucas	Cambridge University; Surrey	17	28	4	832	115	34.66	2	4
Frank Penn	Kent; Marylebone Cricket Club (MCC)	19	33	3	930	148 not out	31.00	2	3
A. N. Hornby	Lancashire; Marylebone Cricket Club (MCC)	18	29	3	787	144	30.26	2	3
Isaac Walker	Middlesex; Marylebone Cricket Club (MCC)	17	29	2	788	95	29.18	0	5

== Leading bowlers (qualification 1,000 balls) ==
1877 English season leading bowlers
Name	Team	Balls bowled	Runs conceded	Wickets taken	Average	Best bowling	5 wickets in innings	10 wickets in match
William McIntyre	Lancashire	2796	949	85	11.16	8/31	11	3
Robert Miles	Gloucestershire	1054	258	23	11.21	5/88	1	0
Tom Armitage	Yorkshire	1424	490	42	11.66	7/58	6	1
George Gibbons Hearne	Kent; Marylebone Cricket Club (MCC)	3596	1281	108	11.86	8/78	11	5
William Mycroft	Derbyshire; Marylebone Cricket Club (MCC)	5496	1927	157	12.27	8/47	19	5

== Events ==
15 - 19 March. Australia v. England at Melbourne Cricket Ground. Afterwards recognised as the first-ever Test Match. Australia won by 45 runs with Charles Bannerman scoring 165*: the first Test century. William Midwinter, with 5–78 in England's first innings, was the first bowler to take five wickets in a Test innings.

31 March - 4 April. Australia v. England: Second Test, also at MCG. England won by 4 wickets.

27 July - 28 July. Gloucestershire beats an "unrepresentative" (Wisden) England team by five wickets. Since 1877 only Yorkshire in 1905 and 1935 has equalled this feat.

10 & 12 November. South Australia v. Tasmania at Adelaide was the earliest first class match played by South Australia. They won by an innings and 13 runs, their team including George Giffen.

== Labels ==
^{a} An unofficial seasonal title sometimes proclaimed by consensus of media and historians prior to December 1889 when the official County Championship was constituted. Although there are ante-dated claims prior to 1873, when residence qualifications were introduced, it is only since that ruling that any quasi-official status can be ascribed.

== Bibliography ==
- ACS (1981). A Guide to Important Cricket Matches Played in the British Isles 1709–1863. Nottingham: ACS. OCLC 85045528.
- ACS (1982). A Guide to First-class Cricket Matches Played in the British Isles. Nottingham: ACS. OCLC 10586869.
- Warner, Pelham (1946). Lords: 1787–1945. London: Harrap. OCLC 877106024.

== Annual reviews ==
- John Lillywhite's Cricketer's Companion (Green Lilly), Lillywhite, 1878
- James Lillywhite's Cricketers' Annual (Red Lilly), Lillywhite, 1878
- Wisden Cricketers' Almanack, 1878
