= 1865 English cricket season =

Cricket season review

The 1865 English cricket season was the second since the legalisation of overarm bowling. W. G. Grace made his debut as a first-class player and the new Lancashire County Cricket Club played its first match. (Note: Some eleven-a-side matches played from 1772 to 1863 have been rated "first-class" by certain sources. However, the term only came into common use around 1864, when overarm bowling was legalised. It was formally defined as a standard by a meeting at Lord's, in May 1894, of Marylebone Cricket Club (MCC) and the county clubs which were then competing in the County Championship. The ruling was effective from the beginning of the 1895 season, but pre-1895 matches of the same standard have no official definition of status because the ruling is not retrospective. Matches of a similar standard since the beginning of the 1864 season are generally considered to have an unofficial first-class status. Pre-1864 matches which are included in the ACS' "Important Match Guide" may generally be regarded as top-class or, at least, historically significant. For further information, see First-class cricket.)

== Events ==
- 15 & 16 February: Earliest inter-colonial match in the West Indies was Barbados v. Demerara (now Guyana) at Bridgetown. This is recognised as the start of West Indian first-class cricket.
- 3 March: Formation of Worcestershire County Cricket Club, which became first-class in 1899.
- 22 June: W. G. Grace made his first-class debut playing for Gentlemen of the South v. Players of the South. This was a two-day match which his team won by an innings and 58 runs. Amazingly, he began his career with a duck: st HH Stephenson b G Bennett. However, he made up for this disappointment by taking 5-44 and 8-40 when aged just 16! Grace played in five matches during his debut season but he was still not attached to a first-class county (Gloucestershire did not become a first-class team until 1870). His other games in 1865 were for Gentlemen v. Players (twice), England v. Surrey and Gentlemen of England v. Gentlemen of Middlesex. Grace played until 1908, and remains peerless as a player and became known to history as "The Great Cricketer". A massive personality who was the sport's supreme all-rounder, but best remembered as a master batsman who conquered the uncertain pitch conditions of his early years before the heavy roller and motor mower eliminated deadly shooters and "bumping" or "flying" balls on the head. His superiority over his contemporaries is astounding and only Don Bradman has a similar stature in the game's history.
- 18 July: The All England Eleven beat the three-year-old record for the highest first-class team total by scoring 524 against Yorkshire, with all eleven batsmen reaching double figures.
- 20 July: Lancashire County Cricket Club joined the list of teams generally accepted in the unofficial County Championship and played its initial first-class match against Middlesex at Old Trafford.
- 23 July:
  - Edward Walker becomes the first bowler to twice take all ten wickets in an innings (having done so in 1859 for England against Surrey), but despite this Lancashire win their inaugural first-class match (they would not win again until 1868)
  - For the only time until 1895, multiple cases of all ten wickets in a first-class innings occur
- 10 August: Tom Humphrey becomes the first batsman to score 1,000 first-class runs in a season. With the improvement of pitches this feat has been achieved every season since 1869 except the exceptionally cool and wet 1879 season.
- For the last time until 1972, no bowler took 100 first-class wickets, with James Lillywhite having the highest aggregate of 87

== Playing record (by county) ==
County	Played	Won	Lost	Drawn
Cambridgeshire	3	1	1	1
Hampshire	3	1	2	0
Kent	7	2	3	2
Lancashire	2	1	1	0
Middlesex	5	3	1	1
Nottinghamshire	7	6	1	0
Surrey	12	7	3	2
Sussex	7	1	4	2
Yorkshire	8	0	6	2

== Leading batsmen (qualification 10 innings) ==
1865 English season leading batsmen
Name	Team	Matches	Innings	Not outs	Runs	Highest score	Average	100s	50s
William Oscroft	Nottinghamshire	9	13	1	518	107	43.16	1	4
Richard Mitchell	Oxford University	7	11	1	390	80	39.00	0	3
Lord Cobham	Marylebone Cricket Club (MCC); Southgate	7	11	0	418	129	38.00	1	2
Richard Daft	Nottinghamshire; All England Eleven	7	12	1	359	78	32.63	0	4
George Parr	Nottinghamshire; All England Eleven	8	11	0	353	78	32.09	0	3

== Leading bowlers (qualification 800 balls) ==
1865 English season leading bowlers
Name	Team	Balls bowled	Runs conceded	Wickets taken	Average	Best bowling	5 wickets in innings	10 wickets in match
Jem Shaw	Nottinghamshire	1495	476	44	10.81	8/32	3	2
John Jackson	Nottinghamshire; All England Eleven	1105	340	29	11.72	7/25	3	0
George Wootton	Marylebone Cricket Club (MCC); Nottinghamshire; All England Eleven	2527	977	84	11.91	10/54	8	5
Thomas Hearne	Marylebone Cricket Club (MCC); Middlesex	1072	370	30	12.33	5/31	3	1
James Lillywhite	Sussex	3959	1147	87	13.18	7/30	8	2

== Bibliography ==
- ACS (1981). A Guide to Important Cricket Matches Played in the British Isles 1709–1863. Nottingham: ACS. OCLC 85045528.
- ACS (1982). A Guide to First-class Cricket Matches Played in the British Isles. Nottingham: ACS. OCLC 10586869.
- Warner, Pelham (1946). Lords: 1787–1945. London: Harrap. OCLC 877106024.

== Annual reviews ==
- Fred Lillywhite, The Guide to Cricketers, Lillywhite, 1866
- John Lillywhite's Cricketer's Companion (Green Lilly), Lillywhite, 1866
- Wisden Cricketers' Almanack, 1866
