= 1866 English cricket season =

Cricket season review

The 1866 English cricket season was the third since the legalisation of overarm bowling. The highlight was the emergence of W. G. Grace as the game's leading batsman with the highest first-class score since William Ward's innings in 1820. James Southerton emerged as an outstanding bowler and the first known "century before lunch" was scored.

== Events ==
- 30–31 July: W. G. Grace at the age of eighteen played an innings of 224 not out which was the highest first-class score since William Ward's record 278 for MCC against Norfolk in 1820.
- 21 August: John Sewell was the first batsman to score a century before the luncheon interval when he advanced from 29 not out to 166 for Middlesex against Surrey at The Oval.

== Playing record (by county) ==
County	Played	Won	Lost	Drawn
Cambridgeshire	5	2	2	1
Hampshire	2	1	1	0
Kent	5	1	1	3
Lancashire	4	0	3	1
Middlesex	8	6	1	1
Nottinghamshire	6	2	1	3
Surrey	10	4	5	1
Sussex	5	1	1	3
Yorkshire	3	0	2	1

== Leading batsmen (qualification 10 innings) ==
1866 English season leading batsmen
Name	Team	Matches	Innings	Not outs	Runs	Highest score	Average	100s	50s
Bob Carpenter	Cambridgeshire	7	10	4	367	97 not out	61.16	0	2
W. G. Grace	Gentlemen; South of England	8	13	2	581	224 not out	52.81	2	1
Edward Walker	Marylebone Cricket Club (MCC); Middlesex	14	18	4	550	79	39.28	0	6
Orlando Spencer-Smith	Oxford University; Hampshire	6	10	1	288	86	32.00	0	2
Charles Payne	Kent; Sussex	10	16	2	471	135 not out	33.64	1	2

== Leading bowlers (qualification 800 balls) ==
1866 English season leading bowlers
Name	Team	Balls bowled	Runs conceded	Wickets taken	Average	Best bowling	5 wickets in innings	10 wickets in match
Jem Shaw	Nottinghamshire; All England Eleven	1446	430	40	10.75	6/36	4	1
James Lillywhite	Sussex	3366	910	71	12.81	7/98	6	1
Edgar Willsher	Kent	2313	688	52	13.23	7/24	3	1
George Tarrant	Cambridgeshire; All England Eleven	2173	809	61	13.26	7/47	6	2
James Southerton	Hampshire	1012	435	32	13.59	7/49	5	2

== Bibliography ==
- ACS (1981). A Guide to Important Cricket Matches Played in the British Isles 1709–1863. Nottingham: ACS. OCLC 85045528.
- ACS (1982). A Guide to First-class Cricket Matches Played in the British Isles. Nottingham: ACS. OCLC 10586869.
- Warner, Pelham (1946). Lords: 1787–1945. London: Harrap. OCLC 877106024.

== Annual reviews ==
- John Lillywhite's Cricketer's Companion (Green Lilly), Lillywhite, 1867
- Wisden Cricketers' Almanack, 1867
