= 1873 English cricket season =

Cricket season review

The 1873 English cricket season was the tenth since the legalisation of overarm bowling. In only their fourth season as a first-class team, Gloucestershire was proclaimed joint Champion County by the media and went on to claim the still unofficial title four times in five seasons (1873, 1874, 1876 and 1877). (Note: Some eleven-a-side matches played from 1772 to 1863 have been rated "first-class" by certain sources. However, the term only came into common use around 1864, when overarm bowling was legalised. It was formally defined as a standard by a meeting at Lord's, in May 1894, of Marylebone Cricket Club (MCC) and the county clubs which were then competing in the County Championship. The ruling was effective from the beginning of the 1895 season, but pre-1895 matches of the same standard have no official definition of status because the ruling is not retrospective. Matches of a similar standard since the beginning of the 1864 season are generally considered to have an unofficial first-class status. Pre-1864 matches which are included in the ACS' "Important Match Guide" may generally be regarded as top-class or, at least, historically significant. For further information, see First-class cricket.)

Player qualification rules came into force, with players having to decide at the start of a season whether they would play for the county of their birth or the county of residence. Before this, it was quite common for a player to play for two counties during the course of a single season, with by far the best-known case being star slow bowler James Southerton who played for his birth county Sussex when they had a match on and otherwise for Surrey. It is only since the residence qualifications were introduced that any quasi-official status can be ascribed to the oft-claimed Champion County title.

== Champion County ==
^{[a]}

- Gloucestershire, Nottinghamshire (shared)

=== Playing record (by county) ===
County	Played	Won	Lost	Drawn
Derbyshire	2	0	2	0
Gloucestershire	6	4	0	2
Kent^{[b]}	5	3	2	0
Lancashire	7	4	3	0
Middlesex	3	2	1	0
Nottinghamshire^{[c]}	7	5	1	1
Surrey	14	2	10	2
Sussex^{[b]}	10	2	6	2
Yorkshire^{[c]}	12	7	4	1
^{[d]}

== Leading batsmen (qualification 15 innings) ==
1873 English season leading batsmen
Name	Team	Matches	Innings	Not outs	Runs	Highest score	Average	100s	50s
WG Grace	Gloucestershire; Marylebone Cricket Club (MCC)	20	32	7	1805	192 not out	72.20	6	8
Isaac Walker	Marylebone Cricket Club (MCC); Middlesex	11	20	3	587	64	34.52	0	2
Fred Grace	Gloucestershire	15	22	3	593	165 not out	31.21	1	3
William Oscroft	Nottinghamshire	17	30	1	758	96	26.13	0	5
Harry Jupp	Surrey	24	45	3	1052	94	25.04	0	8

== Leading bowlers (qualification 800 balls) ==
1873 English season leading bowlers
Name	Team	Balls bowled	Runs conceded	Wickets taken	Average	Best bowling	5 wickets in innings	10 wickets in match
William McIntyre	Lancashire	1517	528	63	8.38	7/37	7	4
Alec Watson	Lancashire	1119	445	48	9.27	6/38	5	1
Arnold Rylott	Marylebone Cricket Club (MCC)	1772	664	69	9.62	9/30	6	4
Fred Morley	Nottinghamshire	1235	375	35	10.71	6/62	3	1
John Maude	Marylebone Cricket Club (MCC); Oxford University	844	255	23	11.08	6/14	2	0

== Labels ==
^{a} An unofficial seasonal title sometimes proclaimed by consensus of media and historians prior to December 1889 when the official County Championship was constituted. Although there are ante-dated claims prior to 1873, when residence qualifications were introduced, it is only since that ruling that any quasi-official status can be ascribed.
^{b} Includes the "County Cup" match at Lord's between Kent and Sussex
^{c} Includes a third Nottinghamshire v Yorkshire match organised privately by Nottinghamshire captain Richard Daft
^{d} Hampshire, though regarded until 1885 as first-class, played no inter-county matches between 1868 and 1869 or 1871 and 1874

== Bibliography ==
- ACS (1981). A Guide to Important Cricket Matches Played in the British Isles 1709–1863. Nottingham: ACS. OCLC 85045528.
- ACS (1982). A Guide to First-class Cricket Matches Played in the British Isles. Nottingham: ACS. OCLC 10586869.
- Warner, Pelham (1946). Lords: 1787–1945. London: Harrap. OCLC 877106024.

== Annual reviews ==
- John Lillywhite's Cricketer's Companion (Green Lilly), Lillywhite, 1874
- James Lillywhite's Cricketers' Annual (Red Lilly), Lillywhite, 1874
- Wisden Cricketers' Almanack, 1874
