= William Shrewsbury (cricketer) =

English cricketer

William Shrewsbury (30 April 1854 – 14 November 1931) was an English first-class cricketer active from 1875 to 1879 who played for Nottinghamshire. He was born in New Lenton and died in Fiskerton, Nottinghamshire.

He was the elder brother of Nottinghamshire and England cricketer Arthur Shrewsbury. His son, Arthur, also played for the county.
