= 1887 English cricket season =

Cricket season review

The 1887 English cricket season was the 24th since the legalisation of overarm bowling. Surrey was the leading county for the first time in over twenty years, a status they would retain until 1892. (Note: Some eleven-a-side matches played from 1772 to 1863 have been rated "first-class" by certain sources. However, the term only came into common use around 1864, when overarm bowling was legalised. It was formally defined as a standard by a meeting at Lord's, in May 1894, of Marylebone Cricket Club (MCC) and the county clubs which were then competing in the County Championship. The ruling was effective from the beginning of the 1895 season, but pre-1895 matches of the same standard have no official definition of status because the ruling is not retrospective. Matches of a similar standard since the beginning of the 1864 season are generally considered to have an unofficial first-class status. Pre-1864 matches which are included in the ACS' "Important Match Guide" may generally be regarded as top-class or, at least, historically significant. For further information, see First-class cricket.)

== Champion County ==
^{[a]}

- Surrey

=== Playing record (by county) ===
| County | Played | Won | Lost | Drawn | Points^{[b]} |
|---|---|---|---|---|---|
| Derbyshire | 6 | 0 | 6 | 0 | 0.0 |
| Gloucestershire | 14 | 1 | 9 | 4 | 3.0 |
| Kent | 14 | 1 | 8 | 5 | 3.5 |
| Lancashire | 14 | 10 | 3 | 1 | 10.5 |
| Middlesex | 10 | 4 | 2 | 4 | 6.0 |
| Nottinghamshire | 14 | 8 | 3 | 3 | 9.5 |
| Surrey | 16 | 12 | 2 | 2 | 13.0 |
| Sussex | 12 | 2 | 8 | 2 | 3.0 |
| Yorkshire | 16 | 6 | 3 | 7 | 9.5 |

== Leading batsmen (qualification 20 innings) ==
1887 English season leading batsmen
| Name | Team | Matches | Innings | Not outs | Runs | Highest score | Average | 100s | 50s |
|---|---|---|---|---|---|---|---|---|---|
| Arthur Shrewsbury | Nottinghamshire | 17 | 23 | 6 | 1653 | 267 | 78.71 | 8 | 5 |
| WG Grace | Gloucestershire; Marylebone Cricket Club (MCC) | 24 | 46 | 8 | 2062 | 183 not out | 54.26 | 6 | 8 |
| Alexander Webbe | Middlesex; Marylebone Cricket Club (MCC) | 18 | 31 | 5 | 1244 | 243 not out | 47.84 | 3 | 3 |
| Walter Read | Surrey | 23 | 36 | 2 | 1615 | 247 | 47.50 | 5 | 5 |
| Kingsmill Key | Oxford University; Surrey | 24 | 44 | 5 | 1684 | 281 | 43.17 | 2 | 10 |

== Leading bowlers (qualification 1,000 balls) ==
1887 English season leading bowlers
| Name | Team | Balls bowled | Runs conceded | Wickets taken | Average | Best bowling | 5 wickets in innings | 10 wickets in match |
|---|---|---|---|---|---|---|---|---|
| Henry Richardson | Nottinghamshire | 2322 | 613 | 45 | 13.62 | 6/58 | 3 | 0 |
| William Attewell | Nottinghamshire | 5361 | 1238 | 89 | 13.91 | 6/24 | 6 | 1 |
| Alec Watson | Lancashire | 6130 | 1482 | 100 | 14.82 | 7/20 | 9 | 3 |
| John Rawlin | Marylebone Cricket Club (MCC) | 2152 | 675 | 45 | 15.00 | 7/47 | 3 | 1 |
| George Lohmann | Surrey | 6526 | 2404 | 154 | 15.61 | 8/36 | 16 | 6 |

== Notable events ==
The driest English cricket season since 1870, combined with improvements to pitches from the heavy roller, allowed for a large number of notable batting feats:

1. Five batsmen with twenty or more innings averaged over 40. Before 1887, no more than two had ever done so in one season.
2. W.G. Grace for the third time reached 2,000 runs; an aggregate not reached by any other batsman until 1893.
3. Arthur Shrewsbury averaged 78.71 for twenty-three innings, beating W.G. Grace's 1871 record of 78.25. This was not beaten until Robert Poore averaged 91.23 in 1899.
4. Shrewsbury's innings of 267 against Middlesex, at 615 minutes, remains the longest innings ever played in a county match.
5. Walter Read became the first batsman to play two consecutive innings of over 200, scoring 247 against Lancashire and 244 against Cambridge University
- For the last time until 1970, no bowler took nine wickets in an innings, with the best analysis being eight for 26 by Dick Barlow.
- As a result of some extremely bad results (only three wins and twenty-nine losses from thirty-five games) and financial trouble, Derbyshire were demoted from first-class status at the end of the season, not to return until 1895.
- An unofficial points system of one point for a win and half a point for a draw was devised by the "Cricket Reporting Agency" as a replacement for the former method of fewest matches lost to decide the "Champion County". Along with a more rigid schedule, it became the ancestor of the official County Championship from 1890 onwards.

== Labels ==
^{a} An unofficial seasonal title sometimes proclaimed by consensus of media and historians prior to December 1889 when the official County Championship was constituted. Although there are ante-dated claims prior to 1873, when residence qualifications were introduced, it is only since that ruling that any quasi-official status can be ascribed.
^{b} The 1887 season saw an unofficial point system of 1 point for a win and 0.5 points for a draw devised by the "Cricket Reporting Agency"

== Bibliography ==
- ACS (1981). A Guide to Important Cricket Matches Played in the British Isles 1709–1863. Nottingham: ACS. OCLC 85045528.
- ACS (1982). A Guide to First-class Cricket Matches Played in the British Isles. Nottingham: ACS. OCLC 10586869.
- Warner, Pelham (1946). Lords: 1787–1945. London: Harrap. OCLC 877106024.

== Annual reviews ==
- James Lillywhite's Cricketers' Annual (Red Lilly), Lillywhite, 1888
- Wisden Cricketers' Almanack, 1888
