= A. P. Lucas =

English first-class cricketer (1857–1923)

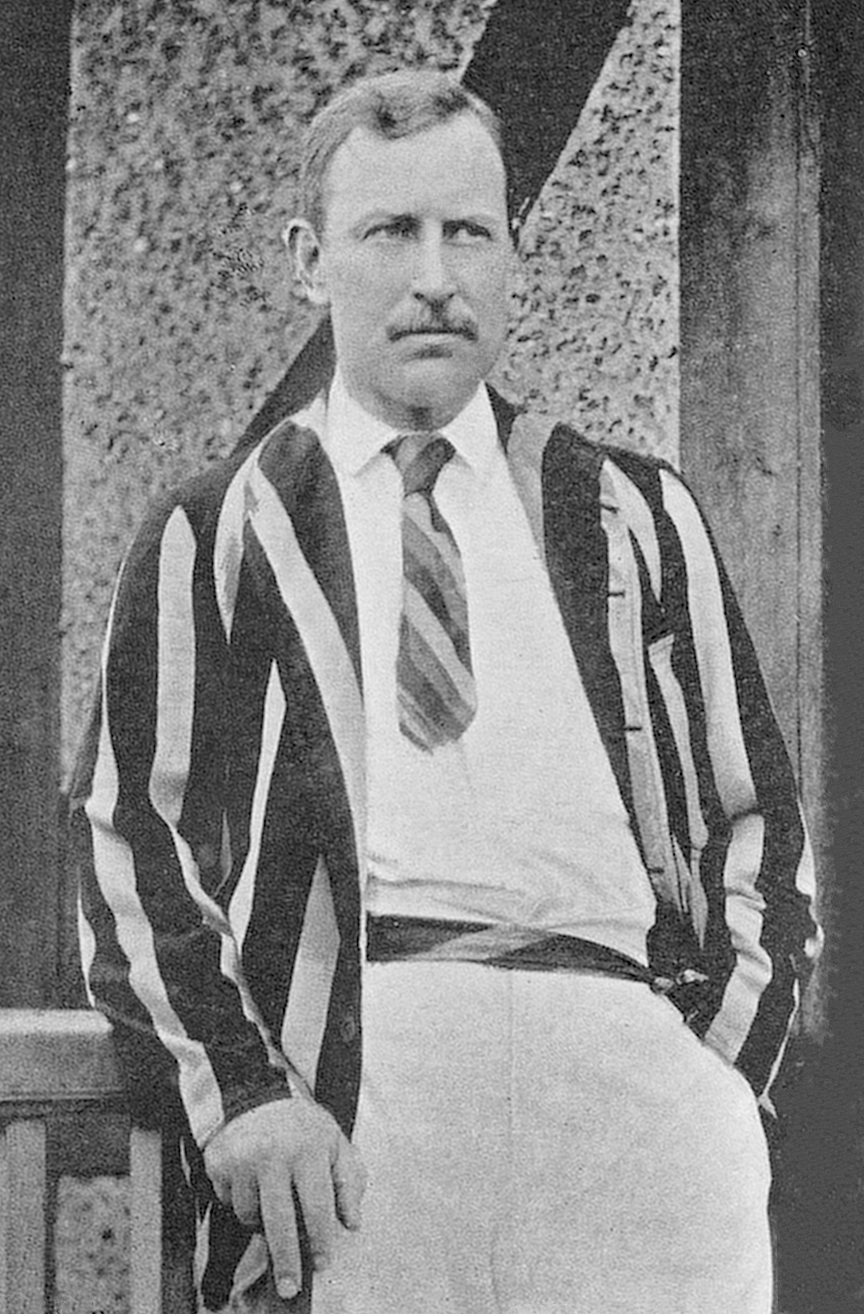

Personal information
- Born: 20 February 1857; Westminster, London
- Died: 12 October 1923 (aged 66); Great Waltham, Essex
- Batting: Right-handed
- Bowling: Right-arm slow
- Relatives: Charles Lucas (cousin)

International information
- National side: England
- Test debut (cap 16): 2 January 1879 v Australia
- Last Test: 23 July 1884 v Australia

Career statistics
| Competition | Test | First-class |
|---|---|---|
| Matches | 5 | 256 |
| Runs scored | 157 | 10,263 |
| Batting average | 19.62 | 26.38 |
| 100s/50s | 0/1 | 8/50 |
| Top score | 55 | 145 |
| Balls bowled | 120 | 7,824 |
| Wickets | 0 | 155 |
| Bowling average | – | 18.38 |
| 5 wickets in innings | – | 4 |
| 10 wickets in match | – | 0 |
| Best bowling | – | 6/10 |
| Catches/stumpings | 1/– | 152/– |
- Source: CricInfo, 6 November 2022

Alfred Perry "Bunny" Lucas (20 February 1857 – 12 October 1923) was an English first-class cricketer from 1874 to 1907, playing for Cambridge University, Surrey, Middlesex and Essex. He also played five Test matches for the England cricket team.

Lucas was educated at Uppingham School and Clare College, Cambridge. Even as a seventeen-year-old, Lucas proved himself an exceptional batsman with an innings of 136 against Marylebone Cricket Club and in a review when Greville Stevens was picked as a schoolboy for the Gentlemen in 1919, was described as good enough to be selected himself. Lucas did play twice for Surrey and caused a sensation at Prince's with an innings of 48 against Alfred Shaw and Fred Morley at their best.

His reputation established, Lucas, eighteen, went to Cambridge University in 1875 and solidified his reputation as a batsman with the rare gift of combining style with extremely solid defence for both the university and in the holidays for Surrey. 1876 saw Lucas advance into the top league of batsmen, with 818 runs at an average of thirty being exceptional for the time and placing him among the top batsmen in the game.

1877 saw Lucas make a further advance, being in average behind only the incomparable W.G. Grace and achieving his highest first-class aggregate for a season of 832 runs. He also showed himself a useful slow bowler, taking 34 wickets for less than fourteen each, and as late as 1882 achieved his best first-class bowling of six wickets for ten runs against his old University for the “Gentlemen of England” – Lucas also achieved his highest first-class score of 145 in the same match. However, opinions as to the quality of Lucas’ bowling were not positive even then and he almost never bowled after 1882. Still, Lucas’ batting in the middle to late 1870s was good enough for him to be a regular for the Gentlemen from 1876 and to play for “England” teams against a combined Kent and Gloucestershire team in 1876 and against Gloucestershire alone the following year. Business prevented Lucas touring Australia with the first Test-playing team in 1876/1877, but despite being rather disappointing in his last year at Cambridge Lucas made his only tour in 1878/1879 under Lord Harris, when he did much more bowling than he would ordinarily have done owing to the absence of any specialist bowler except Tom Emmett.

Although he played only ten first-class games in 1879 despite being the official captain of Surrey, Lucas returned to form under severely difficult conditions due to the abominable weather and was selected for the first Test team in England the following year, where he made 55, his only fifty in five Tests. At the end of 1882 Lucas moved away from Surrey and played for Middlesex under a birth qualification from 1883, when he remained near the top of the first-class batting averages. He achieved the rare feat of carrying his bat through an innings for the Gentlemen at the Oval, and played an innings of 72 at Lord's. Lucas played in the first two Tests of the 1884 season without doing anything worthy of his reputation apart from a dour 15 not out on a sticky wicket in the first match. Owing to his work for the London Stock Exchange, nothing more was seen of Lucas in first-class cricket until 1887, when despite an exceptional summer he was again disappointing.

In 1889, coming to the aid of his good friend C.E. Green, Lucas began to play for Essex, in which he had been residing since 1883, and captaining the side until 1894. However, he played only two first-class matches from 1890 to 1893 and when Essex joined the County Championship in 1895, his profession restricted Lucas to a few games in 1895 and 1896. He then played fairly regularly for Essex until 1901, and if not quite the outstanding batsman of twenty years beforehand, Lucas still was a model of soundness and style. His work as a banker again began to severely restrict his cricket from 1902, but whenever he could play Lucas remained valuable up to his last match at the age of fifty.

Although known to his chums as “Bunny”, he is referred to in all cricket sources, including contemporary reports, either by his surname or as “A. P. Lucas”. To the players under his leadership, he was simply “The Boss”. He is buried in the churchyard of St Mary's, Fryerning, Essex.
