= Henry Richardson (cricketer, born 1857) =

English cricketer

Henry Richardson (4 October 1857 – 20 March 1940) was an English cricketer who played in first-class cricket matches for Nottinghamshire, the Players, the Marylebone Cricket Club (MCC) and several other teams between 1887 and 1894. He was born and died at Bulwell, Nottinghamshire.
