= 1874 English cricket season =

Cricket season review

The 1874 English cricket season was the 11th since the legalisation of overarm bowling. W. G. Grace become the first player to perform the “double” in an English season. In 21 first-class matches, he scored 1,664 runs and took 140 wickets. (Note: Some eleven-a-side matches played from 1772 to 1863 have been rated "first-class" by certain sources. However, the term only came into common use around 1864, when overarm bowling was legalised. It was formally defined as a standard by a meeting at Lord's, in May 1894, of Marylebone Cricket Club (MCC) and the county clubs which were then competing in the County Championship. The ruling was effective from the beginning of the 1895 season, but pre-1895 matches of the same standard have no official definition of status because the ruling is not retrospective. Matches of a similar standard since the beginning of the 1864 season are generally considered to have an unofficial first-class status. Pre-1864 matches which are included in the ACS' "Important Match Guide" may generally be regarded as top-class or, at least, historically significant. For further information, see First-class cricket.)

== Champion County ==
^{[a]}

- Gloucestershire^{[b]}

=== Playing record (by county) ===
County	Played	Won	Lost	Drawn
Derbyshire	4	3	0	1
Gloucestershire	6	4	1	1
Kent	4	1	2	1
Lancashire	6	1	3	2
Middlesex	6	1	4	1
Nottinghamshire	8	5	3	0
Surrey	10	3	6	1
Sussex	8	1	5	2
Yorkshire	12	8	3	1
^{[c]}

== Leading batsmen (qualification 15 innings) ==
1874 English season leading batsmen
Name	Team	Matches	Innings	Not outs	Runs	Highest score	Average	100s	50s
W. G. Grace	Gloucestershire; Marylebone Cricket Club (MCC)	21	32	0	1664	179	52.00	8	2
Harry Jupp	Surrey	21	37	2	1275	154	36.42	3	7
A. N. Hornby	Lancashire; Marylebone Cricket Club (MCC)	8	15	2	365	72	28.07	0	3
Henry Charlwood	Sussex	16	30	5	701	100	28.04	1	2
Fred Grace	Gloucestershire	18	27	4	645	103	28.04	1	2

== Leading bowlers (qualification 800 balls) ==
1874 English season leading bowlers
Name	Team	Balls bowled	Runs conceded	Wickets taken	Average	Best bowling	5 wickets in innings	10 wickets in match
Thomas Lang	Oxford University; Gloucestershire	1351	395	35	11.28	6/27	4	1
Martin McIntyre	Nottinghamshire; All England Eleven	1002	408	36	11.33	6/18	3	0
Allen Hill	Yorkshire	3075	1156	105	11.44	8/48	10	5
Tom Emmett	Yorkshire	3790	1243	107	11.61	6/21	10	2
James Southerton	Surrey	4857	1576	128	12.31	8/70	13	4

== Labels ==
^{a} An unofficial seasonal title sometimes proclaimed by consensus of media and historians prior to December 1889 when the official County Championship was constituted. Although there are ante-dated claims prior to 1873, when residence qualifications were introduced, it is only since that ruling that any quasi-official status can be ascribed.
^{b} Some sources give Derbyshire and though this was once accepted in some publications, including Wisden on the basis of the "least matches lost" principle, it has been superseded.
^{c} Hampshire, though regarded until 1885 as first-class, played no inter-county matches between 1868 and 1869 or 1871 and 1874.

== Bibliography ==
- ACS (1981). A Guide to Important Cricket Matches Played in the British Isles 1709–1863. Nottingham: ACS. OCLC 85045528.
- ACS (1982). A Guide to First-class Cricket Matches Played in the British Isles. Nottingham: ACS. OCLC 10586869.
- Warner, Pelham (1946). Lords: 1787–1945. London: Harrap. OCLC 877106024.

== Annual reviews ==
- John Lillywhite's Cricketer's Companion (Green Lilly), Lillywhite, 1875
- James Lillywhite's Cricketers' Annual (Red Lilly), Lillywhite, 1875
- Wisden Cricketers' Almanack, 1875
