= 1882 English cricket season =

Cricket season review

The 1882 English cricket season was the 19th since the legalisation of overarm bowling. England lost to Australia in the match which gave rise to the Ashes. (Note: Some eleven-a-side matches played from 1772 to 1863 have been rated "first-class" by certain sources. However, the term only came into common use around 1864, when overarm bowling was legalised. It was formally defined as a standard by a meeting at Lord's, in May 1894, of Marylebone Cricket Club (MCC) and the county clubs which were then competing in the County Championship. The ruling was effective from the beginning of the 1895 season, but pre-1895 matches of the same standard have no official definition of status because the ruling is not retrospective. Matches of a similar standard since the beginning of the 1864 season are generally considered to have an unofficial first-class status. Pre-1864 matches which are included in the ACS' "Important Match Guide" may generally be regarded as top-class or, at least, historically significant. For further information, see First-class cricket.)

== Champion County ==
^{[a]}

- Lancashire, Nottinghamshire (shared)

=== Playing record (by county) ===
County	Played	Won	Lost	Drawn
Derbyshire	6	1	5	0
Gloucestershire	11	3	6	2
Hampshire	4	2	2	0
Kent	9	2	6	1
Lancashire	16	12	1	3
Middlesex	11	5	5	1
Nottinghamshire	12	8	1	3
Somerset	5	1	4	0
Surrey	14	4	7	3
Sussex	12	3	8	1
Yorkshire	16	9	5	2

== Leading batsmen (qualification 20 innings) ==
1882 English season leading batsmen
Name	Team(s)	Matches	Innings	Not outs	Runs	Highest score	Average	100s	50s
CT Studd	Middlesex; Marylebone Cricket Club (MCC); Cambridge University; England	25	43	5	1249	126 not out	41.13	4	2
Lord Harris	Kent; England	14	24	0	787	176	32.79	2	4
Bunny Lucas	Middlesex; Marylebone Cricket Club (MCC); England	15	25	3	707	145	32.13	2	3
Billy Murdoch	Australians	32	55	5	1582	286 not out	31.64	2	7
Alexander Webbe	Middlesex	16	28	6	660	108 not out	30.00	1	3

== Leading bowlers (qualification 1,000 balls) ==
1882 English season leading bowlers
Name	Team	Balls bowled	Runs conceded	Wickets taken	Average	Best bowling	5 wickets in innings	10 wickets in match
John Crossland	Lancashire	3184	1127	112	10.06	7/72	10	2
George Nash	Lancashire	1639	656	62	10.58	8/14	4	2
Dick Barlow	Lancashire; England	3576	1009	92	10.96	6/20	7	1
Tom Emmett	Yorkshire	2929	1044	95	10.98	8/52	8	3
Ted Peate	Yorkshire; England	7449	2466	214	11.52	8/32	21	8

== Events ==
- 8 April (approx.): Formation of Warwickshire County Cricket Club at a meeting in Coventry.
- 10 May: Formation of Durham County Cricket Club.
- Somerset County Cricket Club played its initial first-class match v. Lancashire at Old Trafford on 8, 9 & 10 June and joined the County Championship, but for only four seasons initially.
- 14 August: C.T. Studd became the second player after W.G. Grace to accomplish the "double" of 1,000 runs and 100 wickets, which he achieved by dismissing Grace.
- 28 & 29 August. England v. Australia at The Oval (only Test of the season). Australia won the most famous match in history by 7 runs with F R Spofforth, the original "Demon Bowler", taking seven for 46 and seven for 44. Soon afterwards, The Sporting Times printed its legendary obituary notice:

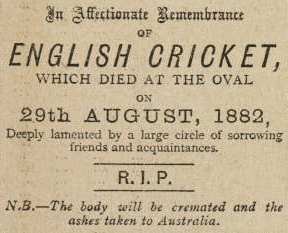
The death notice which first named the Ashes

In Affectionate Remembrance
of
ENGLISH CRICKET,
which died at the Oval
on
29th AUGUST, 1882,
Deeply lamented by a large circle of sorrowing
friends and acquaintances
----
R.I.P.
----
N.B.—The body will be cremated and the
ashes taken to Australia.

- 25 September: Ted Peate breaks the late James Southerton’s 1870 record by taking his 211th wicket of the season. His record stands until Charles Turner takes his 215th wicket on 23 August 1888.

Further details can be found in the articles History of Test cricket (to 1883) and The Ashes.

== Label ==
^{a} An unofficial seasonal title sometimes proclaimed by consensus of media and historians prior to December 1889 when the official County Championship was constituted. Although there are ante-dated claims prior to 1873, when residence qualifications were introduced, it is only since that ruling that any quasi-official status can be ascribed.

== Bibliography ==
- ACS (1981). A Guide to Important Cricket Matches Played in the British Isles 1709–1863. Nottingham: ACS. OCLC 85045528.
- ACS (1982). A Guide to First-class Cricket Matches Played in the British Isles. Nottingham: ACS. OCLC 10586869.
- Warner, Pelham (1946). Lords: 1787–1945. London: Harrap. OCLC 877106024.

== Annual reviews ==
- John Lillywhite's Cricketer's Companion (Green Lilly), Lillywhite, 1883
- James Lillywhite's Cricketers' Annual (Red Lilly), Lillywhite, 1883
- Wisden Cricketers' Almanack, 1883
