= 1878 English cricket season =

Cricket season review

The 1878 English cricket season was the 15th since the legalisation of overarm bowling. The first official tour by an Australian team was undertaken, although it played no Test matches. A match at Old Trafford inspired a famous poem. (Note: Some eleven-a-side matches played from 1772 to 1863 have been rated "first-class" by certain sources. However, the term only came into common use around 1864, when overarm bowling was legalised. It was formally defined as a standard by a meeting at Lord's, in May 1894, of Marylebone Cricket Club (MCC) and the county clubs which were then competing in the County Championship. The ruling was effective from the beginning of the 1895 season, but pre-1895 matches of the same standard have no official definition of status because the ruling is not retrospective. Matches of a similar standard since the beginning of the 1864 season are generally considered to have an unofficial first-class status. Pre-1864 matches which are included in the ACS' "Important Match Guide" may generally be regarded as top-class or, at least, historically significant. For further information, see First-class cricket.)

== Champion County ==
^{[a]}

- Undecided^{[b]}

=== Playing record (by county) ===
County	Played	Won	Lost	Drawn
Derbyshire	10	3	6	1
Gloucestershire	10	4	2	4
Hampshire	4	0	3	1
Kent	12	6	4	2
Lancashire	10	5	3	2
Middlesex	6	3	0	3
Nottinghamshire	14	7	3	4
Surrey	12	3	6	3
Sussex	8	1	7	0
Yorkshire	14	7	5	2

== Leading batsmen (qualification 20 innings) ==
1878 English season leading batsmen
Name	Team	Matches	Innings	Not outs	Runs	Highest score	Average	100s	50s
John Selby	Nottinghamshire	21	31	1	938	107	31.26	1	8
Edward Lyttelton	Cambridge University; Middlesex; Marylebone Cricket Club (MCC)	16	26	0	779	113	29.96	1	3
WG Grace	Gloucestershire; Marylebone Cricket Club (MCC)	24	42	2	1151	116	28.77	1	5
Frank Penn	Kent; Marylebone Cricket Club (MCC)	12	20	1	534	160	28.10	1	3
George Ulyett	Yorkshire	28	51	4	1270	109	27.02	1	9

== Leading bowlers (qualification 1,000 balls) ==
1878 English season leading bowlers
Name	Team	Balls bowled	Runs conceded	Wickets taken	Average	Best bowling	5 wickets in innings	10 wickets in match
Arnold Rylott	Marylebone Cricket Club (MCC)	1944	451	53	8.50	8/15	6	3
Allan Steel	Cambridge University; Lancashire	4493	1547	164	9.43	9/63	19	9
Harry Boyle	Australians	1443	483	51	9.47	7/48	4	0
Tom Garrett	Australians	1042	318	32	9.93	7/38	2	1
William Mycroft	Derbyshire; Marylebone Cricket Club (MCC)	4185	1196	116	10.31	8/36	11	5

== Notable events ==
- Australia made the inaugural first-class tour of England by an overseas team.
- 25 – 27 July: Lancashire versus Gloucestershire at Old Trafford. This was the first time Gloucestershire visited Old Trafford and it caused ground records to be established. The match was drawn after rain interruptions. It has a special place because it ultimately formed the nostalgic inspiration for the famous poem At Lord's by Francis Thompson. In the second innings, the famed "run-stealers" A. N. Hornby and Dick Barlow shared an opening stand of 108, with Hornby going on to score 100. He also became involved in a ferocious argument with WG when a contentious "run-out" was claimed after the batsmen had stopped running because the ball had crossed the boundary. The run-out was finally overruled after WG even went so far as to ask the (Lancashire home) crowd if it had been a four after all. He knew all along that a four had been scored.
- 4 July: Allan Steel becomes the first bowler to take 100 wickets in his first full season of first-class cricket. He played one match in 1877.
- 31 July: Official formation of Northants County Cricket Club at a meeting in the George Hotel, Kettering.
- Alfred Shaw and Fred Morley bowl unchanged through five matches during the season. No other pair has ever managed more than three.
- Shaw becomes the second bowler after James Southerton in 1870 to top 200 wickets in a season.

== Labels ==
^{a} An unofficial seasonal title sometimes proclaimed by consensus of media and historians prior to December 1889 when the official County Championship was constituted. Although there are ante-dated claims prior to 1873, when residence qualifications were introduced, it is only since that ruling that any quasi-official status can be ascribed.
^{b} Middlesex, Nottinghamshire and Yorkshire were all seen as having some claims to the "Championship", but the general consensus was that none of these teams could claim superiority

== Bibliography ==
- ACS (1981). A Guide to Important Cricket Matches Played in the British Isles 1709–1863. Nottingham: ACS. OCLC 85045528.
- ACS (1982). A Guide to First-class Cricket Matches Played in the British Isles. Nottingham: ACS. OCLC 10586869.
- Warner, Pelham (1946). Lords: 1787–1945. London: Harrap. OCLC 877106024.

== Annual reviews ==
- John Lillywhite's Cricketer's Companion (Green Lilly), Lillywhite, 1879
- James Lillywhite's Cricketers' Annual (Red Lilly), Lillywhite, 1879
- Wisden Cricketers' Almanack, 1879
