= Thomas Lang (cricketer) =

English cricketer

Thomas William Lang (22 June 1854 – 30 May 1902 (aged 47)) was an English first-class cricketer. He was a right-handed batsman and a roundarm right-arm medium pace bowler who played from 1872 to 1875 for Oxford University Cricket Club and Gloucestershire County Cricket Club. Lang was born at Selkirk, Scotland.

Lang made 18 first-class appearances, scoring 303 runs @ 13.17 with the highest innings of 54, his sole half-century. He held 9 catches and took 76 wickets at 14.52 with a best analysis of 6–27. He took 10 wickets in a match on one occasion and five wickets in an innings on five other occasions.

Lang was educated at Loretto School, Clifton College and Balliol College, Oxford. He became a stockbroker. He died at Virginia Water, Surrey on 26 December 1894.
