= 1879 English cricket season =

Cricket season review

The 1879 English cricket season was the 16th since the legalisation of overarm bowling. Lancashire claimed a share of the Champion County title for the first time. (Note: Some eleven-a-side matches played from 1772 to 1863 have been rated "first-class" by certain sources. However, the term only came into common use around 1864, when overarm bowling was legalised. It was formally defined as a standard by a meeting at Lord's, in May 1894, of Marylebone Cricket Club (MCC) and the county clubs which were then competing in the County Championship. The ruling was effective from the beginning of the 1895 season, but pre-1895 matches of the same standard have no official definition of status because the ruling is not retrospective. Matches of a similar standard since the beginning of the 1864 season are generally considered to have an unofficial first-class status. Pre-1864 matches which are included in the ACS' "Important Match Guide" may generally be regarded as top-class or, at least, historically significant. For further information, see First-class cricket.)

The summer was the coolest and wettest over the two-and-a-half centuries of climatic records in England, and during the early part of the twentieth century exceptionally wet seasons such as 1903, 1912, 1924 and 1927 were very frequently compared to 1879.

== Champion County ==
^{[a]}

- Lancashire, Nottinghamshire (shared)

=== Playing record (by county) ===
County	Played	Won	Lost	Drawn
Derbyshire	6	2	4	0
Gloucestershire	10	1	3	6
Kent	10	2	7	1
Lancashire	10	5	1	4
Middlesex	8	2	2	4
Nottinghamshire	12	5	1	6
Surrey	10	3	4	3
Sussex	4	1	2	1
Yorkshire	14	7	4	3
^{[b]}

== Leading batsmen (qualification 20 innings) ==
1879 English season leading batsmen
Name	Team	Matches	Innings	Not outs	Runs	Highest score	Average	100s	50s
WG Grace	Gloucestershire	18	28	3	880	123	35.20	2	5
A. N. Hornby	Lancashire; Marylebone Cricket Club (MCC)	17	22	2	606	64 not out	30.30	0	3
Alfred Lyttelton	Cambridge University; Middlesex	16	27	3	688	102	28.66	1	4
Allan Steel	Cambridge University; Lancashire	15	23	3	553	93	27.65	0	3
William Oscroft	Nottinghamshire	19	31	2	763	140	26.31	1	3

== Leading bowlers (qualification 1,000 balls) ==
1879 English season leading bowlers
Name	Team	Balls bowled	Runs conceded	Wickets taken	Average	Best bowling	5 wickets in innings	10 wickets in match
Arnold Rylott	Marylebone Cricket Club (MCC)	1234	291	37	7.86	6/67	1	1
William Mycroft	Derbyshire; Marylebone Cricket Club (MCC)	3052	738	88	8.38	8/32	7	3
Alfred Shaw	Nottinghamshire; Marylebone Cricket Club (MCC)	6381	1277	133	9.60	8/21	13	3
Tom Emmett	Yorkshire	1901	622	63	9.87	7/54	6	1
James Lillywhite	Sussex	1098	229	23	9.95	8/43	1	1

== Notable events ==
- 25 March: Formation of Leicestershire County Cricket Club.
- For the last time to date, no batsman reached 1,000 runs for the season.

== Labels ==
^{a} An unofficial seasonal title sometimes proclaimed by consensus of media and historians prior to December 1889 when the official County Championship was constituted. Although there are ante-dated claims prior to 1873, when residence qualifications were introduced, it is only since that ruling that any quasi-official status can be ascribed.
^{b} Hampshire, though regarded until 1885 as first-class, played no inter-county matches

== Bibliography ==
- ACS (1981). A Guide to Important Cricket Matches Played in the British Isles 1709–1863. Nottingham: ACS. OCLC 85045528.
- ACS (1982). A Guide to First-class Cricket Matches Played in the British Isles. Nottingham: ACS. OCLC 10586869.
- Warner, Pelham (1946). Lords: 1787–1945. London: Harrap. OCLC 877106024.

== Annual reviews ==
- John Lillywhite's Cricketer's Companion (Green Lilly), Lillywhite, 1880
- James Lillywhite's Cricketers' Annual (Red Lilly), Lillywhite, 1880
- Wisden Cricketers' Almanack, 1880
