= 1876 English cricket season =

Cricket season review

The 1876 English cricket season was the 13th since the legalisation of overarm bowling. Gloucestershire reclaimed the unofficial "Champion County" title. A relatively dry summer and improvements to pitches via the heavy roller saw several batting records broken. (Note: Some eleven-a-side matches played from 1772 to 1863 have been rated "first-class" by certain sources. However, the term only came into common use around 1864, when overarm bowling was legalised. It was formally defined as a standard by a meeting at Lord's, in May 1894, of Marylebone Cricket Club (MCC) and the county clubs which were then competing in the County Championship. The ruling was effective from the beginning of the 1895 season, but pre-1895 matches of the same standard have no official definition of status because the ruling is not retrospective. Matches of a similar standard since the beginning of the 1864 season are generally considered to have an unofficial first-class status. Pre-1864 matches which are included in the ACS' "Important Match Guide" may generally be regarded as top-class or, at least, historically significant. For further information, see First-class cricket.)

== Champion County ==
^{[a]}

- Gloucestershire

=== Playing record (by county) ===
County	Played	Won	Lost	Tied	Drawn
Derbyshire	6	2	4	0	0
Gloucestershire	8	5	0	0	3
Hampshire	4	3	1	0	0
Kent	10	4	6	0	0
Lancashire	10	5	5	0	0
Middlesex	6	1	1	1	3
Nottinghamshire	10	4	3	0	3
Surrey	12	2	8	1	1
Sussex	8	3	4	0	1
Yorkshire	10	5	2	0	3

== Leading batsmen (qualification 20 innings) ==
1876 English season leading batsmen
Name	Team	Matches	Innings	Not outs	Runs	Highest score	Average	100s	50s
WG Grace	Gloucestershire; Marylebone Cricket Club (MCC)	26	46	4	2622	344	62.42	7	10
Walter Gilbert	Gloucestershire	17	27	2	907	205 not out	36.28	2	1
Richard Daft	Nottinghamshire; All England Eleven	18	30	2	976	99	34.85	0	6
Ephraim Lockwood	Yorkshire; All England Eleven	25	44	5	1261	108 not out	32.33	1	9
Lord Harris	Kent; Marylebone Cricket Club (MCC)	17	30	1	916	154	31.58	1	4

== Leading bowlers (qualification 1,000 balls) ==
1876 English season leading bowlers
Name	Team	Balls bowled	Runs conceded	Wickets taken	Average	Best bowling	5 wickets in innings	10 wickets in match
William McIntyre	Lancashire	2752	1016	89	11.41	7/33	9	1
Alec Watson	Lancashire	2161	640	51	12.54	7/61	3	2
William Mycroft	Derbyshire; Marylebone Cricket Club (MCC); All England Eleven	3091	1211	95	12.74	9/25	9	2
Arthur Ridley	Hampshire; Marylebone Cricket Club (MCC)	1885	705	53	13.30	6/36	6	3
Alfred Shaw	Nottinghamshire; Marylebone Cricket Club (MCC); All England Eleven	10526	2601	191	13.61	8/37	21	8

== Events ==
- 14 January: Formation of Essex County Cricket Club at a meeting in the Shire Hall, Chelmsford. There had been previous county organisations in Essex going back to the 18th century, mainly around the famous Hornchurch club.
- 20 June: At the soon-to-be-built-on Prince's Cricket Ground, Oxford University made the first total of 600 in a first-class match when they scored 612 against Middlesex with William Game top scoring with 141.
- 27 June: Game became the first Oxonian to score a century against Cambridge, scoring 109
- In August, W.G. Grace made his highest first-class score of 344, for Marylebone Cricket Club (MCC) v Kent at Canterbury in August. Two days later he made 177 for Gloucestershire v Notts, and two days after that scored 318 not out for Gloucestershire v Yorkshire, the latter two innings against counties with exceptionally strong bowling attacks. Thus in three consecutive innings Grace scored 839 runs, and was only out twice. Grace's 344 was the first triple century scored in first class cricket. William Ward's 278 scored in 1820 had stood as a record for 56 years; within a week Grace had bettered it twice.
- Grace also become the first player to score 2000 runs and take 100 wickets in a season: 2622 runs and 130 wickets in 26 matches. His feat was not equalled until Charlie Townsend in 1899.
- Alfred Shaw became the first bowler to bowl 10,000 balls in a season, a feat he was to repeat in 1878 but was not equalled again until J.T. Hearne in 1896. His actual total of 10,526 balls was not bettered until Tich Freeman's record season in 1928.

== Labels ==
^{a} An unofficial seasonal title sometimes proclaimed by consensus of media and historians prior to December 1889 when the official County Championship was constituted. Although there are ante-dated claims prior to 1873, when residence qualifications were introduced, it is only since that ruling that any quasi-official status can be ascribed.

== Bibliography ==
- ACS (1981). A Guide to Important Cricket Matches Played in the British Isles 1709–1863. Nottingham: ACS. OCLC 85045528.
- ACS (1982). A Guide to First-class Cricket Matches Played in the British Isles. Nottingham: ACS. OCLC 10586869.
- Warner, Pelham (1946). Lords: 1787–1945. London: Harrap. OCLC 877106024.

== Annual reviews ==
- John Lillywhite's Cricketer's Companion (Green Lilly), Lillywhite, 1877
- James Lillywhite's Cricketers' Annual (Red Lilly), Lillywhite, 1877
- Wisden Cricketers' Almanack, 1877
