= 1875 English cricket season =

Cricket season review

The 1875 English cricket season was the 12th since the legalisation of overarm bowling. Nottinghamshire regained its place as the unofficial "Champion County". It was in many ways the last season before pitches began to improve and produce much heavier scoring: it was definitely the last season where "dead shooters" were frequently seen at Lord's before the heavy roller made for regular bounce there. (Note: Some eleven-a-side matches played from 1772 to 1863 have been rated "first-class" by certain sources. However, the term only came into common use around 1864, when overarm bowling was legalised. It was formally defined as a standard by a meeting at Lord's, in May 1894, of Marylebone Cricket Club (MCC) and the county clubs which were then competing in the County Championship. The ruling was effective from the beginning of the 1895 season, but pre-1895 matches of the same standard have no official definition of status because the ruling is not retrospective. Matches of a similar standard since the beginning of the 1864 season are generally considered to have an unofficial first-class status. Pre-1864 matches which are included in the ACS' "Important Match Guide" may generally be regarded as top-class or, at least, historically significant. For further information, see First-class cricket.)

== Champion County ==
^{[a]}

- Nottinghamshire

=== Playing record (by county) ===
County	Played	Won	Lost	Drawn
Derbyshire	6	2	3	1
Gloucestershire	8	3	4	1
Hampshire	4	1	3	0
Kent	8	2	6	0
Lancashire	6	4	1	1
Middlesex	6	0	4	2
Nottinghamshire	10	6	1	3
Surrey	10	3	5	2
Sussex	8	5	2	1
Yorkshire	10	6	3	1

== Leading batsmen (qualification 20 innings) ==
1875 English season leading batsmen
Name	Team	Matches	Innings	Not outs	Runs	Highest score	Average	100s	50s
Lord Harris	Kent; Marylebone Cricket Club (MCC)	13	22	3	682	92	35.89	0	5
W. G. Grace	Gloucestershire; Marylebone Cricket Club (MCC)	26	48	2	1498	152	32.56	3	5
A. N. Hornby	Lancashire; Marylebone Cricket Club (MCC)	13	22	1	646	78 not out	30.76	0	4
Fred Grace	Gloucestershire	22	39	4	978	180 not out	27.94	3	2
Ephraim Lockwood	Yorkshire	22	39	4	968	74	27.65	0	5

== Leading bowlers (qualification 800 balls) ==
1875 English season leading bowlers
Name	Team	Balls bowled	Runs conceded	Wickets taken	Average	Best bowling	5 wickets in innings	10 wickets in match
William Mycroft	Derbyshire	2284	664	90	7.37	9/80	13	6
Alfred Shaw	Nottinghamshire; Marylebone Cricket Club (MCC)	7021	1495	160	9.34	8/25	16	5
Alec Watson	Lancashire	893	331	28	11.82	5/57	1	0
William Clarke	Nottinghamshire	919	281	23	12.21	5/19	3	0
WG Grace	Gloucestershire; Marylebone Cricket Club (MCC)	6765	2473	191	12.94	9/48	22	8

== Events ==
- Hampshire County Cricket Club returned to first-class county cricket after four seasons absence.
- 18 August: formation of Somerset County Cricket Club by a team of amateurs at a meeting in Sidmouth, Devonshire, immediately after a match against a local team.

== Labels ==
^{a} An unofficial seasonal title sometimes proclaimed by consensus of media and historians prior to December 1889 when the official County Championship was constituted. Although there are ante-dated claims prior to 1873, when residence qualifications were introduced, it is only since that ruling that any quasi-official status can be ascribed.

== Bibliography ==
- ACS (1981). A Guide to Important Cricket Matches Played in the British Isles 1709–1863. Nottingham: ACS. OCLC 85045528.
- ACS (1982). A Guide to First-class Cricket Matches Played in the British Isles. Nottingham: ACS. OCLC 10586869.
- Warner, Pelham (1946). Lords: 1787–1945. London: Harrap. OCLC 877106024.

== Annual reviews ==
- John Lillywhite's Cricketer's Companion (Green Lilly), Lillywhite, 1876
- James Lillywhite's Cricketers' Annual (Red Lilly), Lillywhite, 1876
- Wisden Cricketers' Almanack, 1876
