= Harry Jupp =

English cricketer (1841–1889)

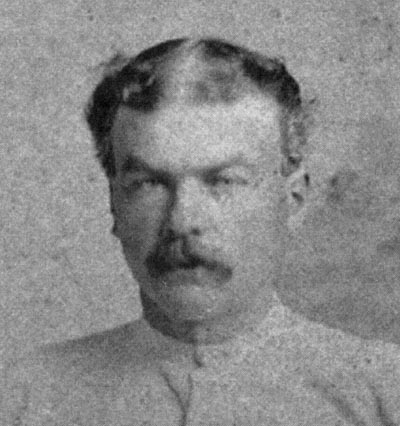

Personal information
- Born: 19 November 1841; Dorking, Surrey
- Died: 8 April 1889 (aged 47); Bermondsey, London
- Batting: Right-handed

International information
- National side: England
- Test debut (cap 6): 15 March 1877 v Australia
- Last Test: 4 April 1877 v Australia

Career statistics
| Competition | Test | First-class |
|---|---|---|
| Matches | 2 | 378 |
| Runs scored | 68 | 15,319 |
| Batting average | 17.00 | 23.78 |
| 100s/50s | 0/1 | 12/73 |
| Top score | 63 | 165 |
| Balls bowled | – | 636 |
| Wickets | – | 7 |
| Bowling average | – | 45.14 |
| 5 wickets in innings | – | 0 |
| 10 wickets in match | – | 0 |
| Best bowling | – | 3/75 |
| Catches/stumpings | 2/– | 228/19 |
- Source: CricketArchive, 20 February 2022

Henry Jupp (19 November 1841 – 8 April 1889) was an English professional cricketer who was the opening batsman for Surrey County Cricket Club from 1862 to 1881. He played in the first-ever Test match, scoring England's first Test fifty.

== Life and career ==
=== Early cricket career ===
Jupp was born in Dorking, Surrey, and played his earliest cricket for the Wellesley House club in Twickenham. Despite not having any experience of first-class cricket, he took his place in a strong Surrey eleven that was to beat the best of the rest of England in 1864 by nine wickets. With Thomas Humphrey, he formed Surrey's first strong opening partnership.

Renowned for his defensive technique, Jupp was known as "Young Stonewaller" after the "Old Stonewaller" Will Mortlock, and was sometimes criticised for not punishing bad balls but he had superb back play which was essential on the unrolled wickets which predominated in the early part of his career. Jupp also managed to develop a very strong cut and drive as time went by, and was also a fine outfield who frequently served as a long stop and occasionally kept wicket when Pooley was absent.

Although Surrey's champion 1860s team collapsed so badly that by 1871 Surrey had become so weak as to win none of thirteen county games, and their batting depth declined to the point of almost total dependence on Jupp, the erratic Humphrey brothers and Ted Pooley, this did not affect Jupp's ability. Harry Jupp first scored 1,000 runs in 1866, in which year he hit 165 against Lancashire, and toured North America in 1868. He reached four figures every year from 1869 to 1874. In 1874 he achieved the feat of carrying his bat through both innings of a match against Yorkshire, a feat equalled in England only by Sep Kinneir, Cecil Wood, Vijay Merchant, Jimmy Cook and D Sudhakar Reddy. The previous winter he had participated in the first English tour of Australia.

Outside of cricket, Jupp was originally a bricklayer, and became a pub landlord in 1875. In that same year, his first wife died and he remarried a woman named Rose Ellen Tubb. In the 1875 season Jupp scored less than half as many runs as in 1874, and despite touring with James Lillywhite’s side in 1876-77 and playing in the matches that became known as the first two Test matches, his batting never again reached the heights of 1874.

=== The first Test ===
In the first-ever Test series that took place from March to April 1877 Harry Jupp was England's opening batsman. In the First Test England lost the toss and were made to field. After toiling in the field for a day and a half he became England's first Test batsman as he faced a first ball from Australian opening bowler John Hodges. Jupp went on to make only the second test fifty (Charles Bannerman of Australia had made 165 in the first innings) and finished on 63, the second-best individual score of the match. He also took over from Selby as wicket keeper after lunch on the first day and took two catches in Australia's second innings.(Wisden Book of Test Cricket)

=== Later life ===
In 1881, he was given a benefit match between the North and South at The Oval, but declined so badly that year that his best score in fourteen innings was 20. He left Surrey after the August Bank Holiday. A benefit match was played every year at Dorking for him after this.

After he retired as a player, Jupp was an umpire until 1888 and the professional to the Lymington Cricket Club in 1883. Jupp died in Bermondsey, London. He was buried at Nunhead, where his gravestone can be found in the undergrowth of the extreme SW corner of the cemetery.
