= Prince's Cricket Ground =

Cricket ground in London, England

Coordinates: 51.4957°N 0.1620°W

Prince's Cricket Ground in Chelsea, London was a cricket ground, created by the brothers George and James Prince as part of the Prince's Club, on which 37 matches were played between 1872 and 1878. The ground was built on in 1883. The boundaries of the site, laid out on the former Cattleugh's nursery gardens, are marked by Cadogan Square West, Milner Street, Lennox Gardens Mews, Walton Street and Pont Street.

The 1872 edition of Wisden Cricketers' Almanack described the ground as 'grand and quick and one of the finest playing grounds in England'.

The first match played on the ground was Household Brigade v. Lords and Commons on 3 June 1871.

Middlesex County Cricket Club used the ground between 1872 and 1876 and played their first match on 23–25 May 1872 against Yorkshire. The ground was also used by South of England and by Gentlemen of the South. Several Gentlemen v Players fixtures were also played there, the first taking place in July 1873. In 1878, the touring Australians played two matches on the ground: Gentlemen of England v Australians and Players v Australians (the last match held on the ground, scheduled for 11 to 13 September but finished in two days). The increasing acquisition of portions of the site for building development, made possible by the Cadogan and Hans Place Improvements Act 1874, discouraged its further use.

The former cricketer Thomas Box was employed as an attendant at the ground. On 12 July 1876, during the Middlesex v Nottinghamshire match, he collapsed. He died three hours later.

The site was also used for lawn tennis, badminton and other games. A permanent roller skating rink was also added.

== Ground records ==
- Highest total: 612 Oxford University v Middlesex 1876 (at the time, the highest total ever made in a match)
- Lowest total: 47 Middlesex v Oxford University 1874
- Highest individual score: 261 W.G. Grace South of England v North of England 1877
- Best bowling: 8-31 Fred Morley Players of the North v Gentlemen of the South 1875
- Highest partnership 281 (for the 2nd wicket) W.G. Grace & J.M. Cotterill South of England v North of England 1877

== Sources ==
- Cricinfo: Prince's Cricket Ground
- Simon Rae, W.G. Grace: A Life, 1998, ISBN 978-0-571-17855-1.
