= Overarm bowling =

Cricket technique

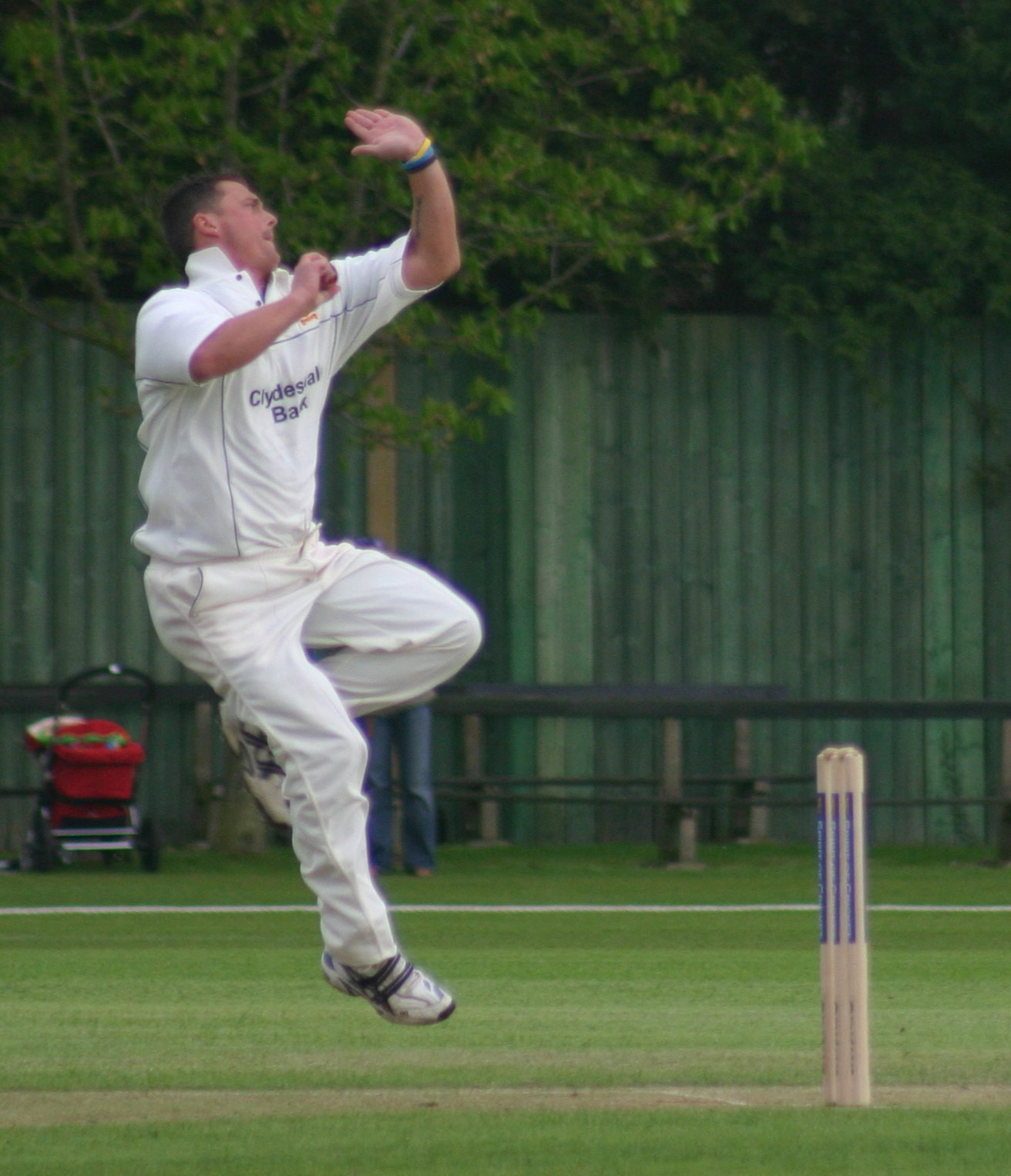
English cricketer Darren Gough about to deliver the ball overarm-style.

In cricket, overarm bowling refers to a delivery in which the bowler's hand is above shoulder height.

When cricket originated all bowlers delivered the ball underarm, where the bowler's hand is below waist height. However, so the story goes, John Willes became the first bowler to use a "round-arm" technique after practising with his sister Christine Willes, who had used the technique, as she was unable to bowl underarm due to her wide and huge skirt impeding her delivery of the ball.

A roundarm delivery is where the hand is between shoulder height and waist height;

After roundarm was legalised in 1835 with the bowler allowed to deliver the ball at shoulder height, it was not long before some bowlers began to raise the hand above the shoulder. The Laws of Cricket at that time directed that such a delivery be called a no-ball. In 1845, the law was strengthened by removing the benefit of doubt from the bowler in height of hand questions, the umpire's view of the incident being final.

Even so, it was only a matter of time before confrontation occurred. The problem was that many umpires were themselves bowlers and believed that the bowler should be allowed to bowl with a fully raised hand. The watershed was reached on 26 August 1862 at The Oval when Surrey hosted All-England. The England bowler Edgar Willsher deliberately bowled overarm and was no-balled six times in succession by umpire John Lillywhite, ironically the son of William Lillywhite, the famous bowler who had done so much to have roundarm legalised in 1835.

In what was surely a pre-rehearsed demonstration, Willsher and the other eight professionals in the England team staged a walk-off, leaving their two amateur colleagues looking non-plussed in the middle. Play continued next day, but Lillywhite diplomatically withdrew and was replaced by another umpire.

MCC responded to this "crisis" with rather more haste than they had to roundarm, and changed the Laws of Cricket in time for the 1864 season. Law 10 was rewritten to allow the bowler to bring his arm through at any height providing he kept it straight and did not throw the ball. This completed the evolution of bowling and the overarm style has remained predominant ever since, though some conservatives (including W G Grace, no less) did continue to bowl roundarm till the end of their careers; and even underarm itself was still seen occasionally.

An interesting historical development of the legalisation of overarm was that for many years, 1864 was deemed to mark the start of "first-class cricket" which suggested that earlier cricket was "second-class". The 1864 origin has been strongly challenged: see also First-class cricket.

== External sources ==
- Laws of cricket
- The evolution of bowling
