= 1895 English cricket season =

Cricket season review

The 1895 English cricket season featured the sixth edition of the County Championship. It was the first season in which the official definition of first-class cricket was activated, following the 1894 ruling. (Note: Any match listed in the ACS' Important Match Guide (1981) is historically important, and therefore of the highest standard, whether or not a scorecard might exist. The same applies to numerous matches discovered by researchers since 1981. For further information, see First-class cricket.) Surrey won the championship for the fifth time in six years, despite increased competition, as the tournament was expanded from nine to fourteen teams. The points system was changed as the teams played differing numbers of matches and the new system involved division of the number of points gained by the number of matches that had ended in either a win or a loss. Draws were thus completely disregarded, as they gave zero points. Derbyshire was the best of the rookie teams, finishing in fifth place.

Another championship made its bow as this season was the first to stage the Minor Counties Championship. The inaugural title was shared by three teams: Durham, Norfolk and Worcestershire.

In the early part of the season, improved batting conditions and long spells of dry weather enabled much heavier scoring than in previous seasons. There were a number of very large scores up until mid-July, when Archie MacLaren played his famous innings of 424 for Lancashire against Somerset at Taunton. After that, rain returned and most pitches from 20 July onwards were "sticky wickets", with the result that bowlers dominated the latter part of the season. Charlie Townsend in particular was able to generate prodigious spin of the ball on these treacherous pitches and took 122 wickets in the last 11 county games. Other established bowlers like Peel, Richardson, Mold and Briggs were very difficult to bat against.

At the age of 46 (when the season began), W. G. Grace enjoyed a remarkable career revival and was the leading run-scorer in all first-class matches, averaging over 50. He became the first player ever to score 1,000 runs during the month of May and also the first to reach the career landmark of one hundred first-class centuries.

== Honours ==
- County Championship - Surrey
- Minor Counties Championship - Durham, Norfolk, Worcestershire (shared title)
- Wisden - WG Grace

== County Championship ==
=== Final table ===
County Championship 1895 - Final Standings
	Team	P	W	L	D	A	Pts	GC^{1}	Pts/GC (as %)
1	Surrey	26	17	4	5	1	13	21	61.90
2	Lancashire	22	14	4	3	1	10	18	55.56
3	Yorkshire	26	14	7	5	0	7	21	33.33
4	Gloucestershire	18	8	6	4	2	0	14	14.29
5	Derbyshire	16	5	4	7	0	1	9	11.11
6	Middlesex	18	6	6	6	0	0	12	0.00
6	Warwickshire	18	6	6	6	0	0	12	0.00
8	Somerset	18	6	8	3	1	-2	14	-14.29
9	Essex	16	5	7	4	0	-2	12	-16.67
10	Hampshire	16	6	9	1	0	-3	15	-20.00
11	Sussex	18	5	9	4	0	-4	14	28.57
12	Leicestershire	16	3	10	3	0	-7	13	-53.85
12	Nottinghamshire	18	3	10	5	0	-7	13	-53.85
14	Kent	18	3	11	4	0	-8	14	-57.14

- ^{1} Games completed

Points system:

- 1 for a win
- 0 for a draw, a tie or an abandoned match
- -1 for a loss

=== Most runs in the County Championship ===
1895 County Championship - leading batsmen
Name	Team	Matches	Runs	Average	100s	50s
Bobby Abel	Surrey	26	1787	51.05	4	6
Albert Ward	Lancashire	21	1446	43.81	1	11
WG Grace	Gloucestershire	18	1424	50.85	4	3
Ranjitsinhji	Sussex	18	1364	41.33	2	10
John Tunnicliffe	Yorkshire	26	1167	27.13	2	6

=== Most wickets in the County Championship ===
1895 County Championship - leading bowlers
Name	Team	Matches	Balls bowled	Wickets taken	Average
Tom Richardson	Surrey	25	6773	239	13.78
Arthur Mold	Lancashire	21	6484	182	13.71
Bobby Peel	Yorkshire	24	6884	136	14.80
George Herbert Hirst	Yorkshire	26	5516	130	16.93
Charlie Townsend	Gloucestershire	12	3376	124	12.58

== Overall first-class statistics ==
=== Leading batsmen ===
1895 English cricket season - leading batsmen
Name	Team(s)	Matches	Runs	Average	100s	50s
WG Grace	England, Gentlemen, Gloucestershire, Marylebone Cricket Club (MCC), South of England	29	2346	51.00	9	5
Bobby Abel	Players, South of England, Surrey	32	2057	44.71	5	6
Albert Ward	England, Lancashire, North of England, Players	27	1790	42.61	2	12
Ranjitsinhji	England, Sussex	21	1775	49.30	4	11
Andrew Stoddart	Gentlemen, I Zingari, Marylebone Cricket Club (MCC), Middlesex, South of England	25	1622	37.72	2	11

=== Leading bowlers ===
1895 English cricket season - leading bowlers
Name	Team(s)	Matches	Balls bowled	Wickets taken	Average
Tom Richardson	Players, South of England Surrey	31	8456	290	14.37
Arthur Mold	England, Lancashire, North of England, Players	27	8143	213	15.96
Bobby Peel	North of England, Players, Yorkshire	32	8509	180	14.97
Walter Mead	England, Essex, Marylebone Cricket Club (MCC), South of England	23	6034	179	14.55
George Herbert Hirst	North of England, Yorkshire	32	6312	150	17.06

== Bibliography ==
- ACS (1981). A Guide to Important Cricket Matches Played in the British Isles 1709–1863. Nottingham: ACS. OCLC 85045528.
- ACS (1982). A Guide to First-class Cricket Matches Played in the British Isles. Nottingham: ACS. OCLC 10586869.
- Warner, Pelham (1946). Lords: 1787–1945. London: Harrap. OCLC 877106024.

== Annual reviews ==
- James Lillywhite's Cricketers' Annual (Red Lilly), Lillywhite, 1896
- Wisden Cricketers' Almanack, 1896
