= Somerset County Cricket Club in 1882 =

Events of the 1882 cricket season

Somerset County Cricket Club
1882 season
- Captain: Stephen Newton
- Most runs: William Herbert Fowler (361)
- Most wickets: Arnold Fothergill (26)

Somerset County Cricket Club made their debut in first-class cricket in the 1882 English cricket season. They were captained by Stephen Newton, and played eight first-class matches, five against county opposition, two against the Marylebone Cricket Club and one against the touring Australian team. They only won one of the eight contests, that against Hampshire at Taunton. Of the other matches, one was drawn and the other six were all losses for Somerset. Wisden Cricketers' Almanack described the season as "disastrous", but the publication qualified this statement with mild optimism for 1883.

Part of the reason for Somerset's poor performances was their inability to consistently field their best players; at least four of their better cricketers were unable to commit to the full fixture list, and in all the county played 30 different people in their eight matches. Faint praise was offered to the batting of William Herbert Fowler, Newton and Edward Sainsbury in The Sportsman, but the bowling was considered by Wisden to be sub-standard, particularly that of Arnold Fothergill.

== Background ==
Somerset County Cricket Club was formed in 1875, and played irregular county fixtures in the years after that, during which time they struggled to remain financially solvent. Upon their formation, the club had no fixed home ground, and it was declared that they would play "on any ground in the county that may be selected by the committee." However, in 1881, they moved into the newly built Athletic Grounds in Taunton. (Note: Now known as the County Ground.) Although it is widely accepted that Somerset's debut first-class match came in 1882, some records do include earlier matches in 1879 and 1881 against Gloucestershire as being of first-class status.

== Squad ==
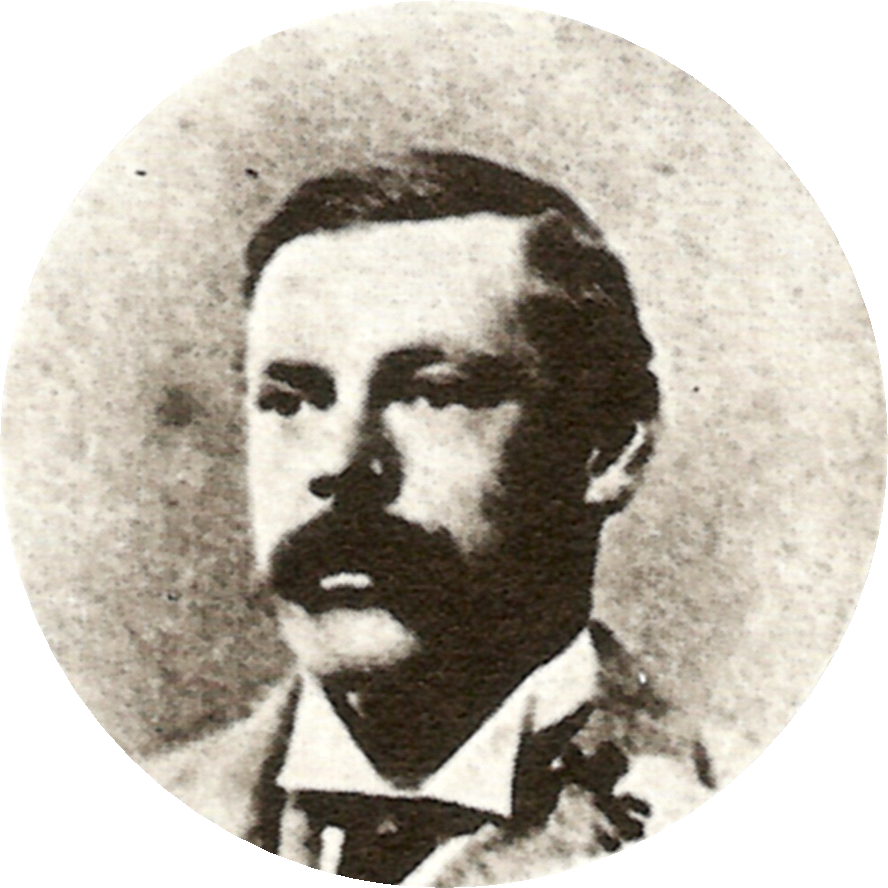
Bill Roe was one of a number of players that were only available for part of the season.

In their eight first-class matches in 1882, Somerset fielded 30 different players. Only three appeared in all eight matches: Arnold Fothergill, William Herbert Fowler, and Edward Sainsbury, while fourteen players appeared in only one match that season. (Note: Statistics collated from the national batting averages, and for those players who appeared for more than one side, their individual record for that season: Arnold Fothergill, Bill Fowler, Robert Ramsay and Bill Roe.) The club captain, Stephen Newton, missed the first three matches of the season as he was a schoolmaster in London, and was not available until the summer holidays. Newton was not the only talented player to only make limited appearances for the side; in their review of the season, the Wisden Cricketers' Almanack explained that Alfred Evans, Robert Ramsay and Bill Roe were all unavailable at various points, and that these absences were among "many good reasons to account for a disastrous season."

The following players made at least one appearance for Somerset in first-class cricket in 1882. Age given is at the start of Somerset's first match of the season (8 June 1882).

Key

- † denotes that the player appeared as a wicket-keeper for Somerset in 1882
- Apps denotes the number of appearances made by the player for Somerset in 1882
- Ref denotes the reference for the player details

Name	Birth date	Batting style	Bowling style	Apps	Ref
William Cookson	29 August 1862 (aged 19)	Unknown	—	1	
Alfred Evans	14 June 1858 (aged 23)	Right-handed	Right-arm fast-medium	2	
Arnold Fothergill	26 August 1854 (aged 27)	Left-handed	Left-arm medium-fast	8	
William Herbert Fowler	28 May 1856 (aged 26)	Right-handed	Right-arm fast	8	
Henry Fox	30 September 1856 (aged 25)	Unknown	—	3	
Herbert Fox	1 August 1858 (aged 23)	Right-handed	—	4	
Cleveland Greenway	29 October 1864 (aged 17)	Right-handed	—	1	
Henry Hall	24 December 1857 (aged 24)	Unknown	—	1	
Lyonel Hildyard	5 February 1861 (aged 21)	Right-handed	—	1	
Francis Hill	1 October 1862 (aged 19)	Right-handed	—	1	
Richard Hill	12 August 1861 (aged 20)	Right-handed	—	1	
Frederick Hotham	17 January 1844 (aged 38)	Right-handed	—	1	
William Massey	11 April 1846 (aged 36)	Unknown	—	1	
Stephen Newton (captain)	21 April 1853 (aged 29)	Right-handed	—	5	
Dudley Pontifex	12 February 1855 (aged 27)	Right-handed	—	1	
Frederick Potbury	7 November 1862 (aged 19)	Unknown	—	1	
Robert Ramsay	20 December 1861 (aged 20)	Right-handed	Right-arm leg break	4	
Farrant Reed	10 September 1865 (aged 16)	Right-handed	—	1	
Francis Reed	24 October 1850 (aged 31)	Right-handed	Right-arm medium	6	
Bill Roe	21 March 1861 (aged 21)	Right-handed	Right-arm off break / medium	4	
Edward Sainsbury	8 July 1851 (aged 30)	Right-handed	Underarm slow	8	
Henry Scott	28 October 1851 (aged 30)	Right-handed	—	2	
Charles Sweet	29 November 1860 (aged 21)	Unknown	—	4	
Harry Tate	18 July 1862 (aged 19)	Unknown	—	1	
Walter Tate	27 August 1863 (aged 18)	Unknown	—	1	
Francis Terry †	26 October 1860 (aged 21)	Right-handed	—	2	
William Trask	15 July 1859 (aged 22)	Right-handed	—	3	
Fred Welman †	19 February 1849 (aged 33)	Right-handed	—	5	
Edward Western	12 May 1845 (aged 37)	Right-handed	—	1	
Charles Winter	9 October 1866 (aged 15)	Right-handed	Right-arm fast	6	

== County cricket ==
=== Summary ===
==== First half of the season: away matches ====
Somerset made their debut in first-class cricket against Lancashire on 8 June 1882. The Western Daily Press noted that Somerset were not able to field a full-strength team in the match, missing Evans, Ramsay and Roe. However, the Lancashire team which faced them was described by the same paper as being "very second-rate". The weather was showery most of the day, and play was abandoned at half five because of the rain, with Lancashire on 231 for 8 having won the toss and batted first. Heavy rain overnight made the ground unplayable on the second day, so play resumed the following day, although rain continued to threaten. The original wicket was badly damaged, being described in the York Herald as "a puddle", and so the stumps were moved to enable play to begin. Somerset took the final two Lancashire wickets in the first ten minutes, bowling them out for 237. Fowler and Sainsbury opened the batting for Somerset, and put on eighteen runs together before being dismissed in quick succession. The Western Daily Press recorded that "after this disaster waited on the visitors." Only two other batsmen scored any runs for Somerset, and they were all out for 29 runs, the second lowest first-class total at the time. Somerset followed-on, and their second innings proceeded in much the same fashion as the first; the pair scored 35 runs, while the rest of the team only added a further 6. Somerset lost the match by an innings and 157 runs. The Bath Chronicle and Weekly Gazette defended Somerset's performance on the third day slightly, noting that the poor condition of the pitch favoured the Lancashire bowlers. Lancashire's George Nash took eight wickets in the first innings, including four in one four-ball over, while fellow spin bowler Jack Crossland collected six in the second innings.

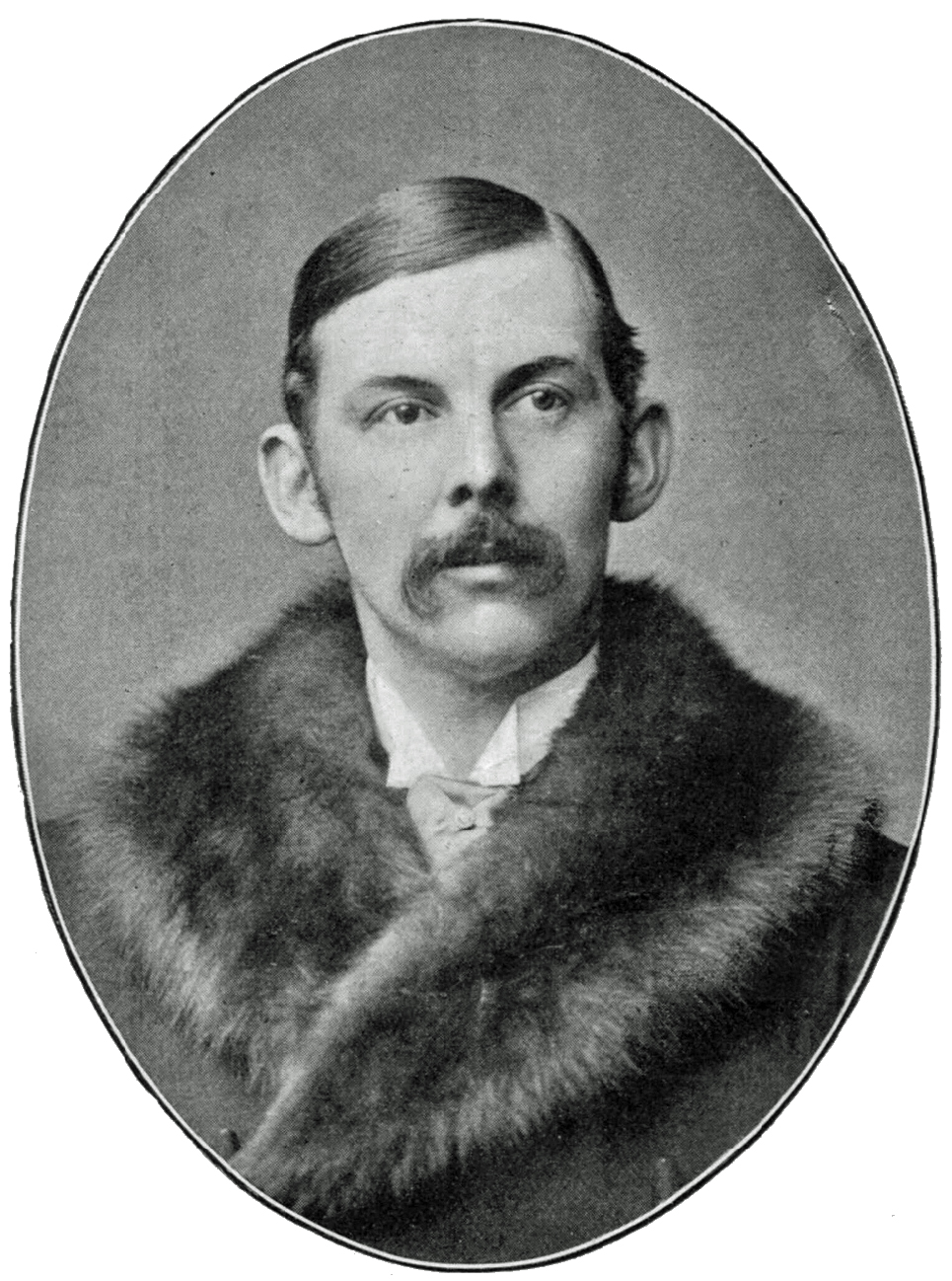
William Herbert Fowler was one of the few Somerset players to be praised by the Western Gazette in their summary of the season.

In Somerset's second match, they faced their nearest opposition, Gloucestershire. Once again, the weather was poor, and the Spa Ground in Gloucester, which was hosting the match, was specially looked after during the heavy rain preceding the match to ensure that it would be in a good condition for the game. As it was, the Bristol Mercury described the wicket as being "in fairly good order", and play started just over half-an-hour late on the first day. Somerset's batting failed to make a significant total; Fowler was the only batsman to reach double figures, totalling more than half of his team's runs with 39. W. G. Grace took eight wickets for Gloucestershire to bowl Somerset out for 62. In Gloucestershire's reply, E. M. Grace and Billy Midwinter scored centuries to help them establish a lead of 286 runs. In their response, Somerset scored 109, including a partnership of 61 between Sainsbury and Fred Welman which was praised in the Birmingham Daily Post. Despite an improved batting performance, Somerset lost the match by an innings and 177 runs.

Facing Hampshire in Southampton for the third match, Somerset won the toss and opted to bat first. The pitch was soft, due to the heavy rainfall through the morning, and play started shortly after midday. Sainsbury was yet again one of few Somerset players to reach double figures, and they were bowled out for 101. Cecil Currie, a spin bowler for Hampshire, collected eight of the wickets. Somerset managed to restrict Hampshire's lead to 46 runs; Francis Reed took four wickets, and Fothergill three. Fowler and Fothergill were Somerset's most successful batsmen in their second innings, played mostly in light rain, helping the county to reach 118 runs. That left Hampshire requiring 73 runs to win, which the hosts achieved without losing any wickets, to beat Somerset with ten wickets to spare.

The Somerset team travelled to Lord's in London in early August to face the Marylebone Cricket Club (MCC). Somerset batted first after winning the toss, but lost three batsmen for ducks early in the innings. Somerset's captain, Newton – playing his first match of the season for the county, batted for the rest of the innings to score 57 runs, and shared a large partnership with Francis Reed. The MCC started well in their innings, but the introduction of Fowler into the bowling attack brought their batting to a quick conclusion; Fowler took four wickets while only conceding eight runs, and claimed a hat-trick by bowling Edward Hawtrey, Charles Burke and Thomas Mycroft in successive deliveries. Somerset had a 25-run lead going into the second innings, in which Newton once again top-scored. In addition to his total of 67, Lyonel Hildyard made an unbeaten 59, and Fowler scored 23 runs from just six scoring shots, including a six which went out of the ground. The Western Daily Press described Fowler as "possibly the hardest hitter amongst English cricketers", while his history of the county, David Foot suggests that Fowler was "perhaps the earliest Somerset batsman to parade the fundamental skills of slogging." Somerset totalled 219, to leave the MCC needing to score 245 runs to win. Principally due to the batting of John Russel, the MCC reached the target, but only had one wicket remaining; Fothergill having taken five wickets and Charles Winter four.

==== Second half of the season: home matches ====
A few days later, Somerset played their first home fixture, at the Taunton Athletic Grounds, hosting Hampshire. In contrast to many of their previous game, the weather was good, and on winning the toss, Hampshire decided to bat first. Charles Seymour batted well for the visitors, accruing 57 out of Hampshire's 146 runs, but Fowler was again the best of the Somerset bowlers, collecting four wickets for nine runs to help restrict the Hampshire total. Ramsay top-scored for Somerset in their reply, accumulating 71 runs before being bowled, while a number of other batsmen made useful scores to help Somerset to their total of 214. Edward Western, the Somerset secretary batted in his only innings of the season for the county, coming in as the last man, but he failed to score a run. Somerset struggled to collect wickets when Hampshire batted again, and tried eight different bowlers without much success. Their fielding was described by the Bristol Mercury as being "loose", but when the sixth wicket was taken, with 232 runs scored, the rest followed reasonably quickly, and Hampshire finished on 290. Fowler was dismissed early in Somerset's chase, but Newton and Sainsbury put on 118 runs together to help their towards victory. Sainsbury was dismissed for 63, but Newton continued to bat, putting on 80 runs before being dismissed. Somerset eventually reached the required total with five wickets remaining to achieve their first win of the season.

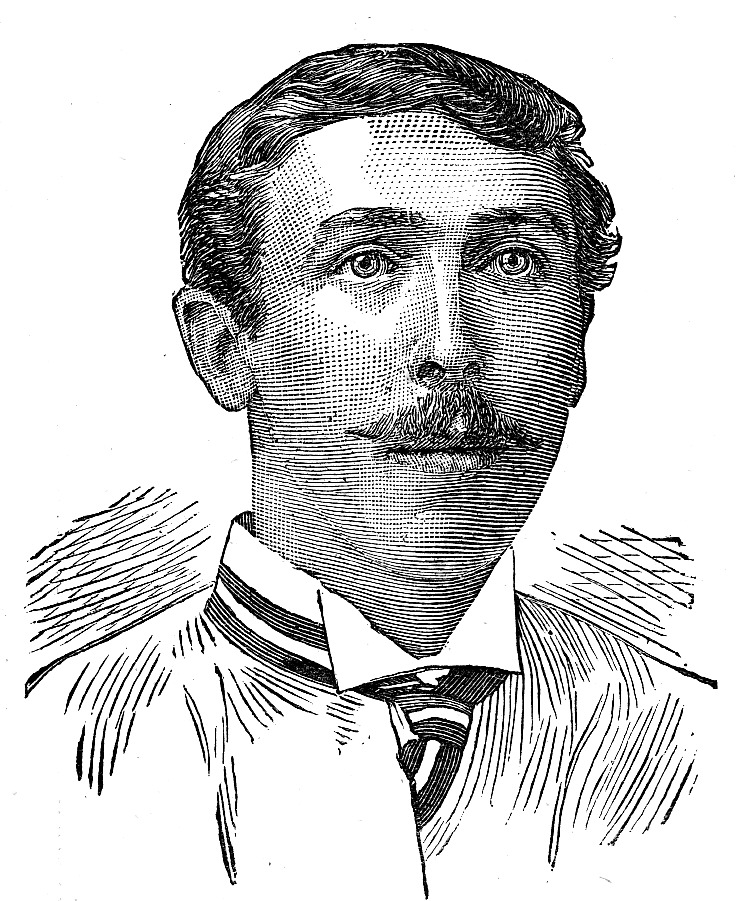
Billy Gunn scored 188 runs against Somerset, prompting the Western Daily Press to claim that Somerset's bowling had been mastered by the MCC batsmen.

The next day after defeating Hampshire, Somerset faced the MCC at Taunton. The MCC had brought a strong team, including eight professionals, and on winning the toss they elected to bat. After a cautious start, the second-wicket partnership of Billy Gunn and William Hearn put on 173 runs together, and according to the Western Daily Press, "the Somerset bowling was completely mastered." Somerset tried eight different bowlers to try to get a wicket, but the partnership was eventually broken when Hearn was run out for 91. Frank Hearne then joined Gunn at the crease, and the pair continued the MCC's dominance, adding a further 130 runs. Another run out, again due to the fielding of Newton, brought Gunn's innings to an end, after the MCC batsman had scored 188 runs. Wickets then began to fall more frequently; Roe collected three, while Fothergill and Winter had two apiece, and the MCC were eventually all out for 506 on the second morning. In their response, Somerset lost the early wickets of Sainsbury and Newton, but then a partnership between Fowler and Roe took the score up to 181, during which Fowler reached his century, coming in just 55 minutes. Once that partnership was ended with the dismissal of Roe, Somerset regularly lost wickets. Fowler was caught in the slips for 139, which had included three sixes, and Somerset ended their innings on 286. They followed on, and lost five early wickets before a partnership between Francis Terry, who scored 77 runs, and Fothergill steadied the innings and help Somerset secure a draw.

Somerset's final county match of the season came against the same opposition as their first, Lancashire. The low attendance at the match was criticised in the press, and the Western Daily Press in particular described that "it was painfully obvious that Tauntonians, as a body, take no interest in first-class cricket." Six wickets from Evans helped Somerset to limit Lancashire to 178 runs in their first innings, but Somerset failed to capitalise; Fowler and Newton scored 24 and 23 runs respectively, but no other batsman reached double figures. Somerset were dismissed for 74 runs, more than 100 behind, and were asked to follow on by Lancashire. Batting again, the Somerset players put in an improved performance, and reached 157 runs, of which Roe scored 45. Lancashire were required to bat again, but reached the winning target of 53 runs for the loss of only one wicket.

Towards the end of August, the touring Australian team visited Taunton, attracting the largest crowd of the season, roughly 1,500 people. Somerset were not considered to have much chance in the match, though Australia were missing three of their better players. The Leeds Mercury offered Somerset faint praise, suggesting that they had "no great cause to be dissatisfied with their performances." The Australians batted first, and were restricted to 245 by Somerset. Alick Bannerman was the highest scorer for the tourists, with 50 runs, while Evans and Fothergill took three wickets each. In their response, Somerset's batsmen struggled against the bowling of Fred Spofforth, who was known as the "Demon". Spofforth took nine wickets, while conceding only 51 runs, and Somerset were forced to follow-on; no batsman scored more than 17 runs in the first innings for the county. In the second-innings, Somerset performed slightly better; Newton scored 32 runs, and five other batsmen reached double figures. The Australian bowling once again proved too much though, and Somerset lost the match by an innings and 19 runs. The Western Daily Press praised the accurate bowling of both Spofforth and Harry Boyle during the match.

=== Season record ===
Played	Won	Lost	Drawn	Win%
8	1	5	1	12.50

=== Match log and statistics ===
County matches
No.	Date	Opponents	Venue	Result	Ref
1	8–10 June	Lancashire	Old Trafford, Manchester	Lost by an innings and 157 runs	
2	13–14 July	Gloucestershire	Spa Ground, Gloucester	Lost by an innings and 177 runs	
3	24–25 July	Hampshire	Day's Ground, Southampton	Lost by 10 wickets	
4	8–10 August	Hampshire	Athletic Grounds, Taunton	Won by 5 wickets	
5	14–15 August	Lancashire	Athletic Grounds, Taunton	Lost by 9 wickets	

Other matches
No.	Date	Opponents	Venue	Result	Ref
1	4–5 August	Marylebone Cricket Club	Lord's, London	Lost by 1 wicket	
2	11–12 August	Marylebone Cricket Club	Athletic Grounds, Taunton	Drawn	
3	21–22 August	Australians	Athletic Grounds, Taunton	Lost by an innings and 19 runs	

Batting averages
Player	Matches	Innings	Runs	Average	Highest score	100s	50s
Francis Terry	2	4	107	35.66	77*	0	1
Stephen Newton	5	10	310	34.44	80	0	3
William Herbert Fowler	8	16	361	22.56	139	1	0
Robert Ramsay	4	8	145	20.71	71	0	1
Bill Roe	4	8	158	19.75	45	0	0
Edward Sainsbury	8	16	255	17.00	63	0	1
Fred Welman	5	10	103	12.87	36	0	0
Arnold Fothergill	8	15	120	9.23	29	0	0
Qualification: 100 runs. Source: CricketArchive.

Bowling averages
Player	Matches	Balls	Wickets	Average	BBI	5wi	10wm
William Herbert Fowler	8	344	12	13.75	4/8	0	0
Charles Winter	6	390	13	16.00	4/49	0	0
Alfred Evans	2	322	10	20.00	6/75	1	0
Arnold Fothergill	8	1,537	26	25.30	5/70	1	0
Robert Ramsay	4	576	9	32.11	4/50	0	0
Francis Reed	6	668	7	44.57	4/35	0	0
Qualification: 5 wickets. Source: CricketArchive. (Note: Statistics collated from the national bowling averages, and for those players who appeared for more than one side, their individual record for that season: Alfred Evans, Arnold Fothergill, Bill Fowler, and Charles Winter.)

== Notes and references ==
Notes

== Bibliography ==
- Roebuck, Peter. From Sammy to Jimmy: The Official History of Somerset County Cricket Club (1991 ed.). London: Partridge Press. ISBN 1-85225-085-2.
- Foot, David. Sunshine, Sixes and Cider: The History of Somerset Cricket (1986 ed.). Newton Abbot, Devon: David & Charles. ISBN 0-7153-8890-8.
