= Potbury =

Potbury is a surname. Notable people with the name include:

- Frederick Potbury (1862–1943), English cricketer
- Isabella Potbury (1890–1965), English portrait painter and suffragette
