= Queensland State Recruiting Committee =

The Queensland State Recruiting Committee was established by the Australian Government in December 1916 to encourage Queensland men to enlist in the Australian Imperial Forces after the failure of the first conscription plebiscite in 1916. It replaced the volunteer Queensland Recruiting Committee which operated from May 1915 to December 1916.

== Membership ==
The initial membership of the committee included:

- Thomas Givens, Australian senator for Queensland
- Littleton Groom, Member of the House of Representatives for Darling Downs
- Jim Page, Member of the House of Representatives for Maranoa
- John Adamson, Australian senator for Queensland
- Robert Christian Ramsay
- W. G. King
- Canon David John Garland
- Captain George Macdonald Dash (secretary)
