= Squatting (Australian history) =

Occupation of Crown land in order to graze livestock in Australia

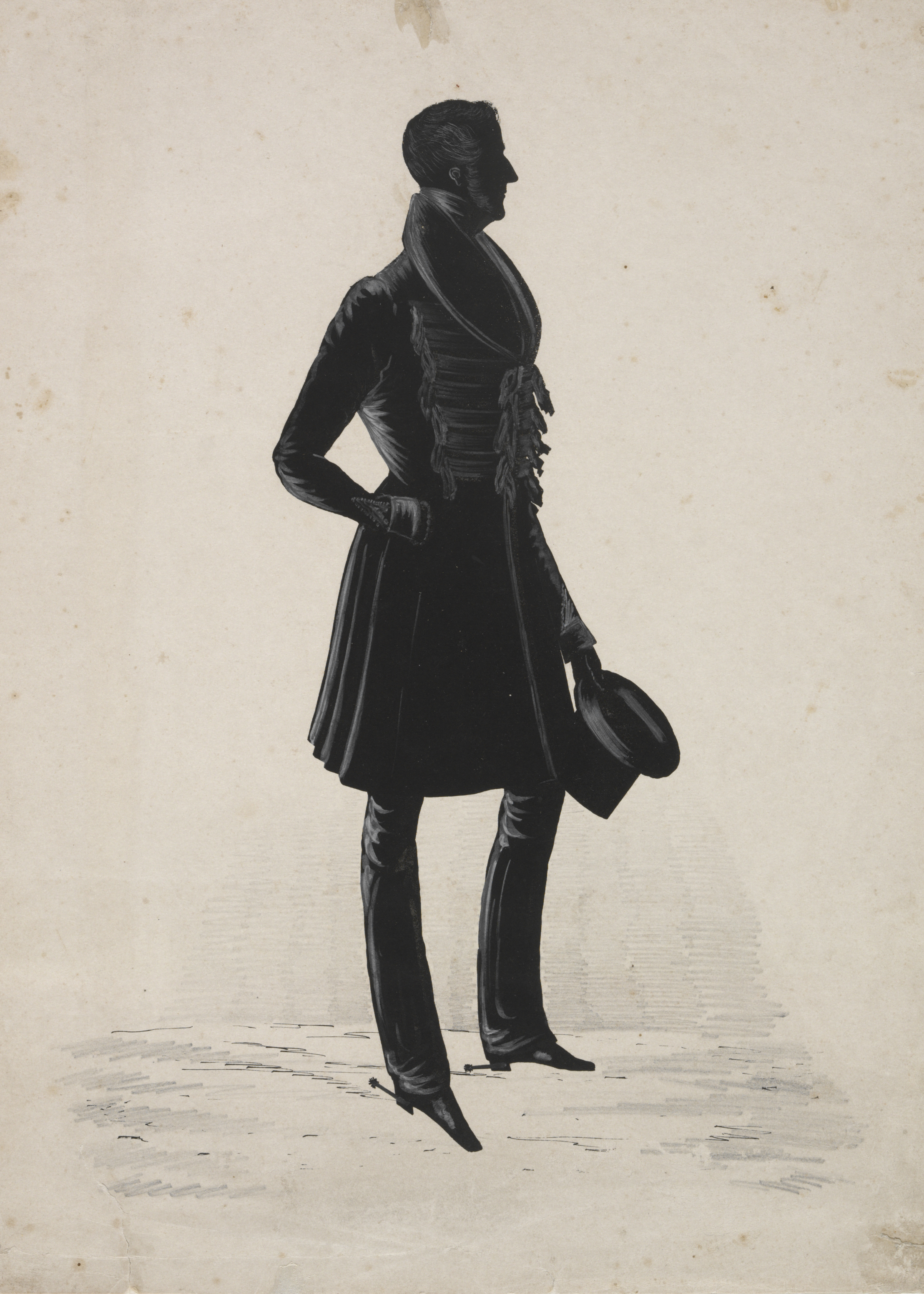
Archibald Clunes Innes, a prominent squatter in the colony of New South Wales, silhouette by W.H. Fernyhough, 1836

In colonial Australia, particularly in the early to mid-19th century, squatting was the occupation of large tracts of Crown land, typically to graze livestock, without formal legal title. Although squatters initially had no recognised rights to the land they occupied, colonial authorities gradually legitimised their claims through licensing systems and later land laws, often favouring those who were the first (and sometimes only) European settlers in a region. Over time, squatters, particularly in New South Wales and Victoria, came to control most of the arable land in their colonies, amassing vast wealth and exerting considerable influence in colonial legislatures and politics.

The term squattocracy, a play on aristocracy, was coined to describe this landholding class and the sociopolitical power they possessed. Their dominance was increasingly challenged by land reformers who sought to break up large pastoral holdings and make Crown land available to small farmers, also known as selectors. By the late 19th century, land reform, expanding colonial bureaucracy, and the rise of democratic politics had contributed to the decline of the squattocracy as a distinct social class, though many former squatters remained wealthy pastoralists. By the time of Federation in 1901, the term squattocracy was largely obsolete, marking the transition of squatters from a powerful colonial elite to a less formally defined group of large landholders.

The legacy of squatters remains contested in Australian history. While some are remembered as pioneering pastoralists who contributed to European exploration, regional settlement, infrastructure development and colonial governance, squatters are also associated with the dispossession of Aboriginal peoples and the entrenched social inequalities of colonial society. The squatter has been depicted in many cultural works, including Australia's most popular bush ballad and "unofficial national anthem", "Waltzing Matilda" (1895) by Banjo Patterson, which contrasts the authority of a wealthy squatter with the struggles of a swagman.

== Evolution of meaning ==
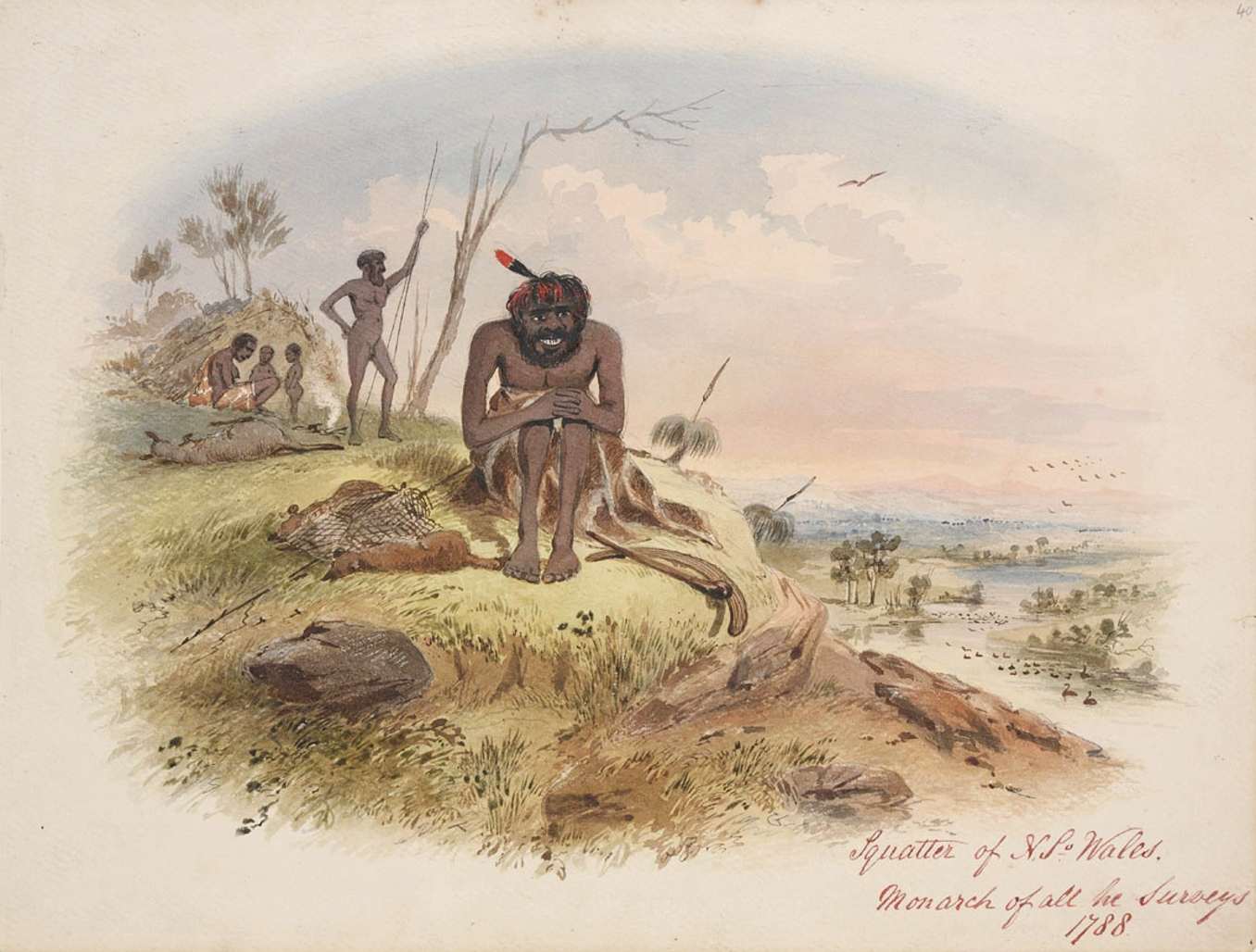

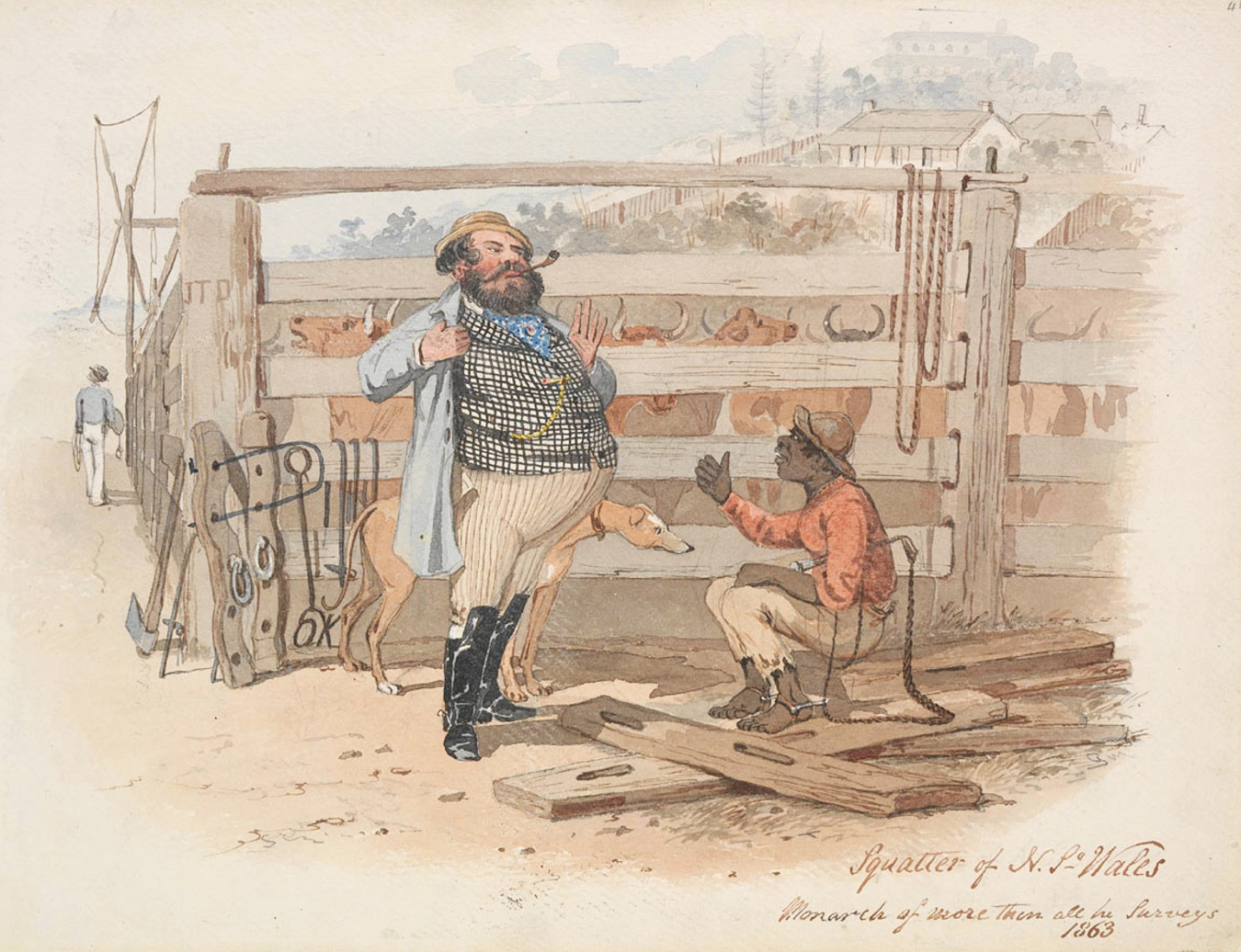
Colonial artist S. T. Gill supports Aboriginal land rights and condemns the Squattocracy in Squatter of N. S. Wales: Monarch of all he Surveys, 1788 (above) and Squatter of N. S. Wales: Monarch of more than all he Surveys, 1863 (below).

The term squatter derives from its English usage as a term of contempt for a person who had taken up residence at a place without having legal claim. The use of squatter in the early years of British settlement of Australia had a similar connotation, referring primarily to a person who had occupied pastoral land not granted to them by the colonial authorities.

From the mid-1820s, however, the occupation of legally unoccupied land without legal title became more widespread, often carried out by those from the upper echelons of colonial society. As wool began to be exported to England and the colonial population increased, the occupation of pastoral land for raising cattle and sheep progressively became a more lucrative enterprise. Squatting had become so widespread by the mid-1830s that Government policy in New South Wales towards the practice shifted from opposition to regulation and control. By that stage, the term squatter was applied to those who occupied land under a lease or license from the Crown, without the negative connotation of earlier times.

The term soon developed a class association, suggesting an elevated socio-economic status and entrepreneurial attitude. By 1840 squatters were recognized as being amongst the wealthiest men in the colony of New South Wales, many of them from upper and middle-class English and Scottish families. As legally unoccupied land with frontage to permanent water became more scarce, the acquisition of runs increasingly required larger capital outlays. A "run" is defined in Christopher Pemberton Hodgson's 1846 Reminiscences of Australia, with Hints on the Squatter's Life as: "land claimed by the Squatter as sheepwalks, open, as nature left them, without any improvement from the Squatter."

Eventually the term squatter came to refer to a person of high social prestige who grazes livestock on a large scale (whether the station was held by leasehold or freehold title). In Australia the term is still used to describe large landowners, especially in rural areas with a history of pastoral occupation. The term squattocracy, a play on "aristocracy", was used derisively as early as 1841.

== Background and history ==
When the First Fleet established a settlement at Sydney Cove in 1788, the colonial government claimed all of Australia east of the 135th meridian east, without regard to the presence of the existing Indigenous population. Land that had been deemed "unoccupied" by Europeans was described as Crown land. Governors of New South Wales were given authority to make land grants to free settlers, emancipists (former convicts) and non-commissioned officers. When land grants were made they were often subject to conditions such as a quit rent (one shilling per 50 acres (20 ha) to be paid after five years) and a requirement for the grantee to reside on and cultivate the land. In line with the British government's policy of concentrated land settlement for the colony, governors of New South Wales tended to be prudent in making land grants. By the end of Governor Macquarie's tenure in 1821 less than 1,000 square miles (2,600 km^{2}) of land had been granted in the colony of New South Wales.

During Governor Brisbane's term, however, land grants were more readily made. In addition regulations introduced during Brisbane's term enabled settlers to purchase (with his permission) up to 4,000 acres (16 km^{2}) at 5s. an acre (with superior quality land priced at 7s. 6d.). During Governor Brisbane's four years in office the total amount of land in private hands virtually doubled.

The impetus for squatting activities during this early phase was an expanding market for meat as the population of Sydney increased. The first steps in establishing wool production in New South Wales also created an increased demand for land. Squatting activity was often carried out by emancipist and native-born colonists as they sought to define and consolidate their place within society.

=== Darling and the "limits of location" ===
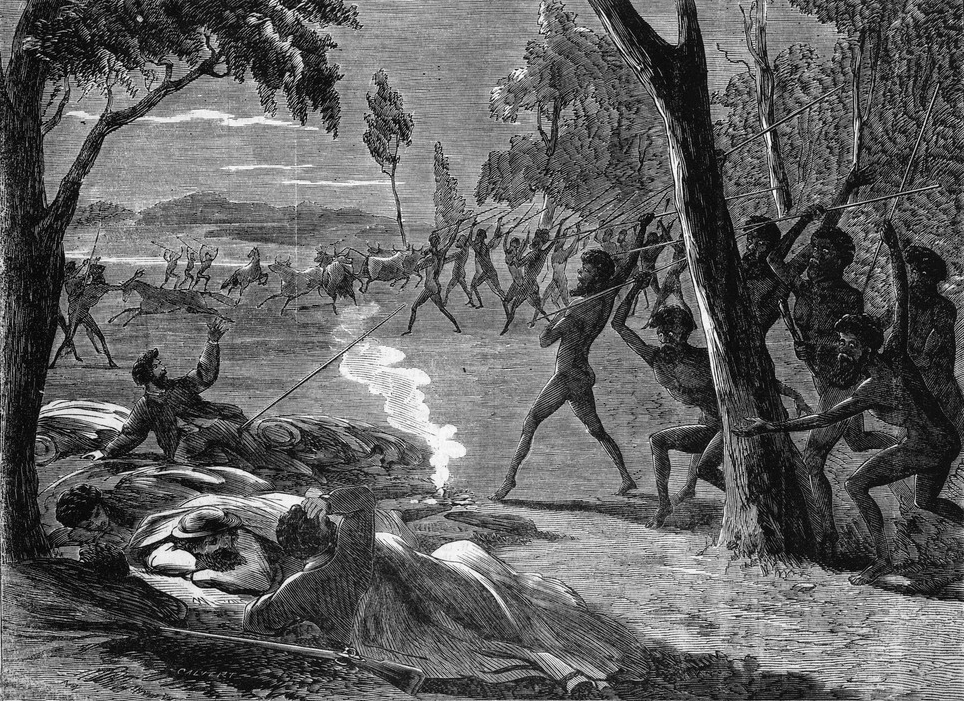
Warfare between squatters and Aboriginal people in South Australia

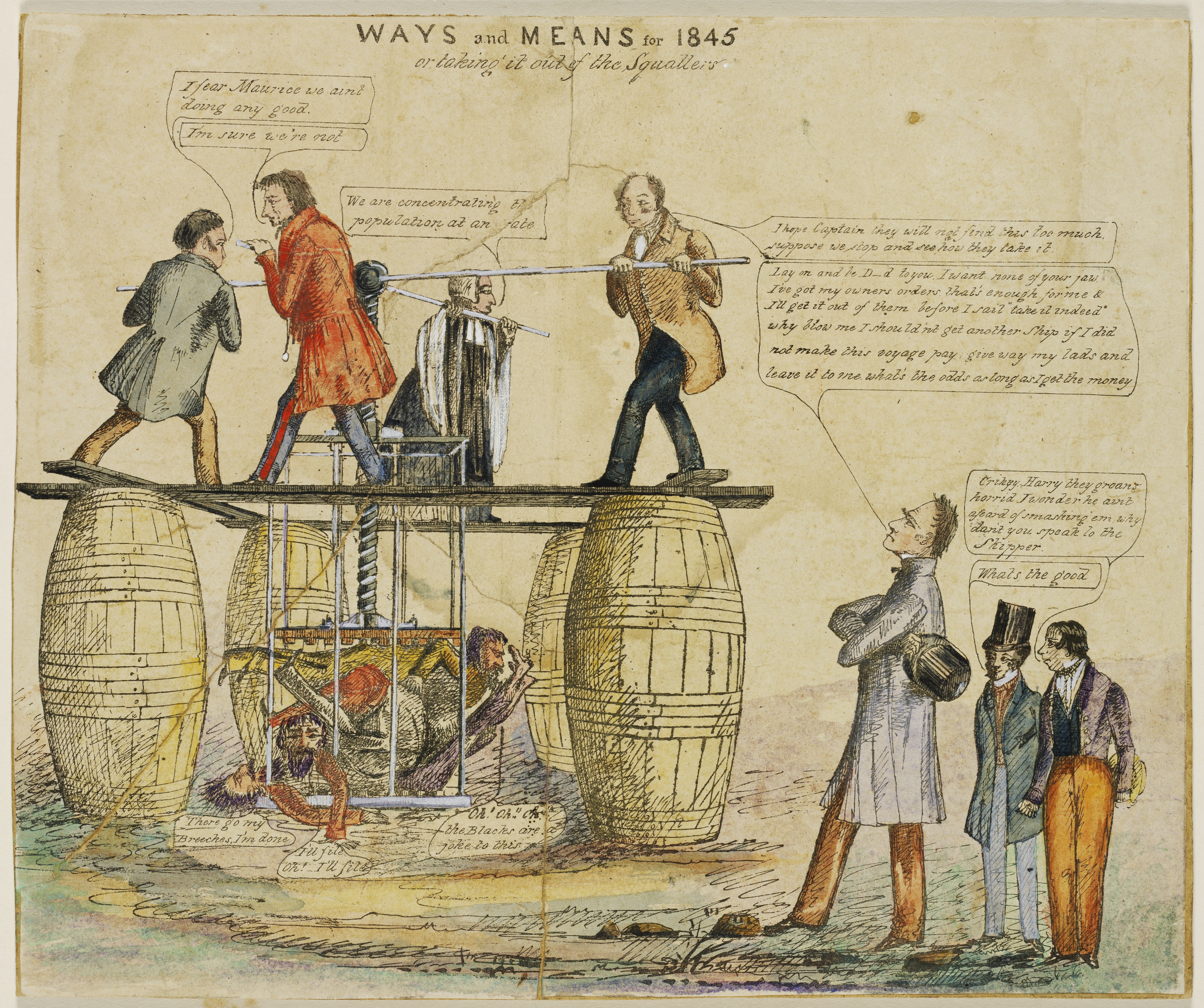
1845 political cartoon by Edward Winstanley, critical of Governor George Gipps' land reforms

From 1824 there were acts and regulations to limit squatting. The "limits of location", also known as the Nineteen Counties, were defined from 1826; beyond these limits land could not be squatted on or subdivided and sold. This was because of the expense of providing government services (police, etc.) and difficulty locating the squatters over a wide tract of land. However the nature of the sheep industry which required access to vast grassy plains meant that despite the limitations, squatters often occupied land far beyond the colony's official limits. From 1833 Commissioners of Crown Lands were appointed under the Encroachment Act to manage squatting.

From 1836 legislation was passed to legalise squatting with grazing rights available for ten pounds per year. This fee was for a lease of the land, rather than ownership, which is what the squatters wanted. The 1847 Orders in Council divided land into settled, intermediate and unsettled areas, with pastoral leases of one, eight and 14 years for each category respectively. From here on, squatters were able to purchase parts of their land, as opposed to just leasing it.

Squatters fought battles with European weapons against the local Indigenous Australian communities in the areas they occupied, though such battles were rarely investigated. These battles and massacres are the subject of the history wars, being the term for an ongoing public discussion on Australia's interpretation of its history. Squatters were only occasionally prosecuted for killing indigenous people. The first conviction of white men for the massacre of Indigenous people followed the Myall Creek massacre in 1838, in which Aboriginal subject status was employed by colonial courts for the rare co-incidence of local, colonial and imperial authorities.

Whilst life was initially tough for the squatters, with their huge landholdings many of them became very wealthy and were often described as the "squattocracy". The descendants of these squatters often still own significant tracts of land in rural Australia, though most of the larger holdings have been broken up, or, in more isolated areas, have been sold to corporate interests.

In April 1844 Governor Gipps made two regulations with the intention of remodelling the squatting system. The first, gazetted on 2 April, permitted squatters to occupy runs on payment of £10 for every 20 square miles (52 km^{2}). The second regulation allowed squatters after 5 years occupancy to purchase 320 acres (1.3 km^{2}) of a run and gave purchasers security of tenure over a whole run for another 8 years. 150 squatters gathered in Sydney later in the month of April and protested against Gipps's changes drafting a petition to the Queen and forming the Pastoral Association of New South Wales - the first formalising of the identity of squatters as a political group.

A large squatting demonstration was held in Melbourne in June 1844. The lessees of the Crown lands came into Melbourne on horseback, and marched to the place of the meeting with flags flying, preceded by a Highland piper playing martial airs. At this meeting petitions were adopted to be transmitted to the several branches of the Home and Colonial Legislatures, requesting alterations in the law of Crown lands and a total separation from the Middle District (New South Wales). A new association was formed at this meeting, and designated the Pastoral Society of Australian Felix.

=== Legislation to allow selection ===
In the 1860s several colonies passed legislation to permit selection.

==== Victoria ====
In the colony of Victoria, the 1860 Land Act allowed free selection of Crown land, including that occupied by pastoral leases. Squatting land holders actions during Ned Kelly's childhood would lead to his later career as a Bushranger.

==== Queensland ====
The process of land selection in Queensland began in 1860 and continued under a series of land acts in subsequent years. Separated from New South Wales in 1859, land was considered the new Queensland colony's greatest asset and its prosperity as a colony was measured according to the extent of land settlement. Rent from land leases was the colony's largest revenue earner. The initial political contest was between the squatters who controlled large tracts of land and the new immigrants who wanted small land holdings. The resumption of squatters' land for division into smaller farms (known as closer settlement) was promoted by the Queensland Government to attract immigrants to Queensland. Although Queensland legislation was framed with the aim of a comprehensive land policy, lobbying by both groups led to numerous rule changes about the conditions of occupancy of the land and who had priority. Consequently there were over 50 principal and amending acts covering all land legislation up to 1910.

==== New South Wales ====
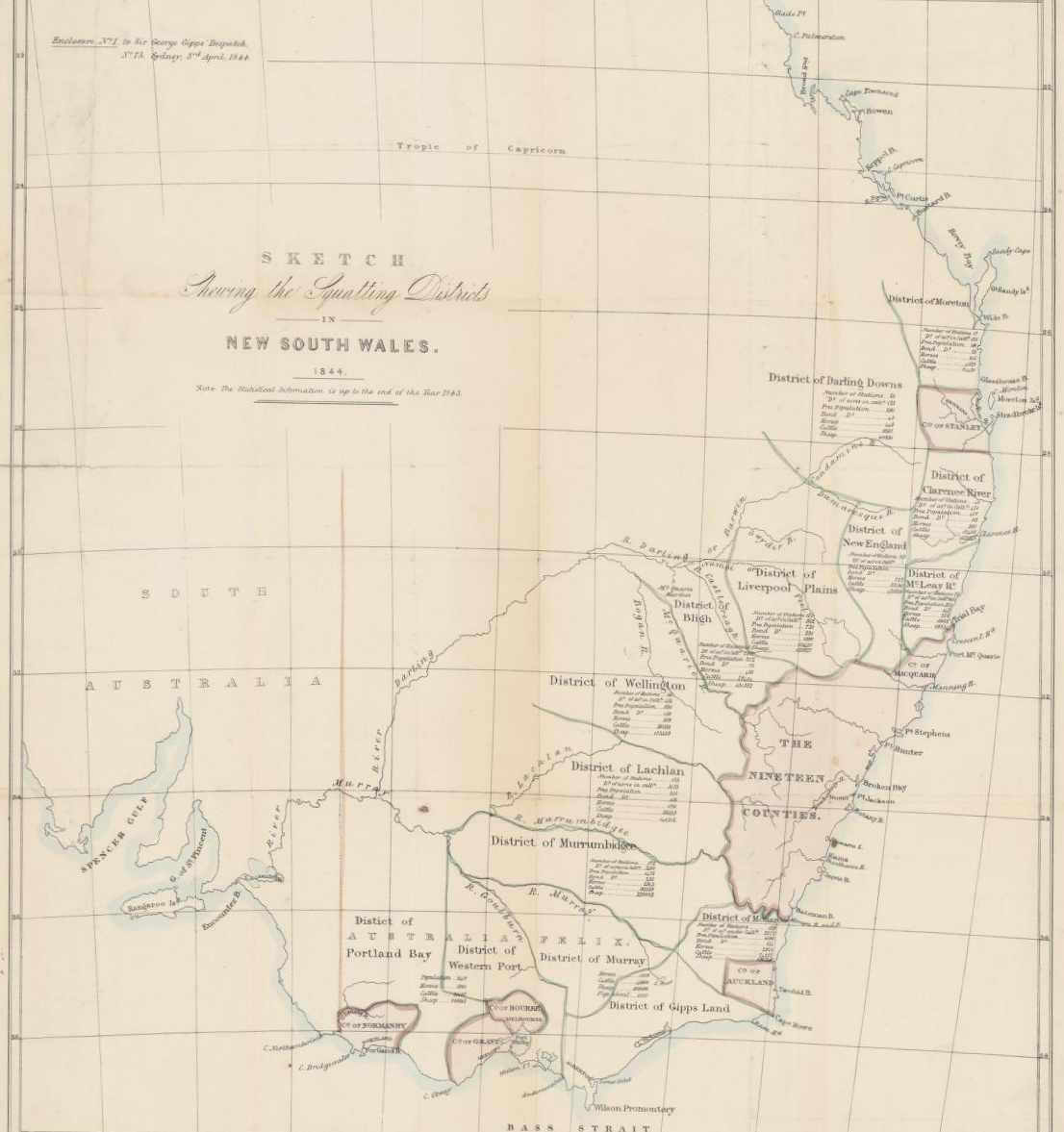
Squatting districts in New South Wales, 1844

The squatters' grip on agricultural land in the colony of New South Wales was challenged in the 1860s with the passing of Land Acts that allowed those with limited means to acquire land. With the stated intention of encouraging closer settlement and fairer allocation of land by allowing "free selection before survey", the Land Acts legislation was passed in 1861. The relevant acts were named the Crown Lands Alienation Act and Crown Lands Occupation Act. The application of the legislation was delayed until 1866 in inland areas such as the Riverina where existing squatting leases were still to run their course. In any case severe drought in the Riverina in the late 1860s initially discouraged selection in areas except those close to established townships. Selection activity increased with more favourable seasons in the early 1870s.

Both selectors and squatters used the broad framework of the Land Acts to maximise their advantages in the ensuing scramble for land. There was a general manipulation of the system by squatters, selectors and profiteers alike. The legislation secured access to the squatter's land for the selector, but thereafter effectively left him to fend for himself. Amendments passed in 1875 sought to remedy some of the abuses perpetrated under the original selection legislation.

However discontent was rife and a political shift in the early 1880s saw the setting up of a commission to inquire into the effects of the land legislation. The Morris and Ranken committee of inquiry, which reported in 1883, found that the number of homesteads established was a small percentage of the applications for selections under the Act, especially in areas of low rainfall such as the Riverina and the lower Darling River. The greater number of selections were made by squatters or their agents, or by selectors unable to establish themselves or who sought to gain by re-sale. The Crown Lands Act of 1884, introduced in the wake of the Morris-Ranken inquiry, sought to compromise between the integrity of the large pastoral leaseholds and the political requirements of equality of land availability and closer settlement patterns. The Act divided pastoral runs into Leasehold Areas (held under short-term leases) and Resumed Areas (available for settlement as smaller homestead leases) and allowed for the establishment of local Land Boards.

==== South Australia ====
Prior to 1851, squatters paid a licence fee of £10 per year (regardless of area), with no surety of tenure from one year to the next. After 1851, leases could be acquired for 14 years, with annual rent. The Strangways Land Act in 1869 provided for replacing large pastoral runs with closer-settled more intensive farming.

== Political and social legacy ==
A significant proportion of squatters opposed the movement for self-determination by workers that gained impetus in the last decades of the 19th century in Australia. The events of the shearers' strike of 1891 and the harsh counter-measures by government and squatters left a bitter legacy that adversely affected class relationships in the ensuing decades.

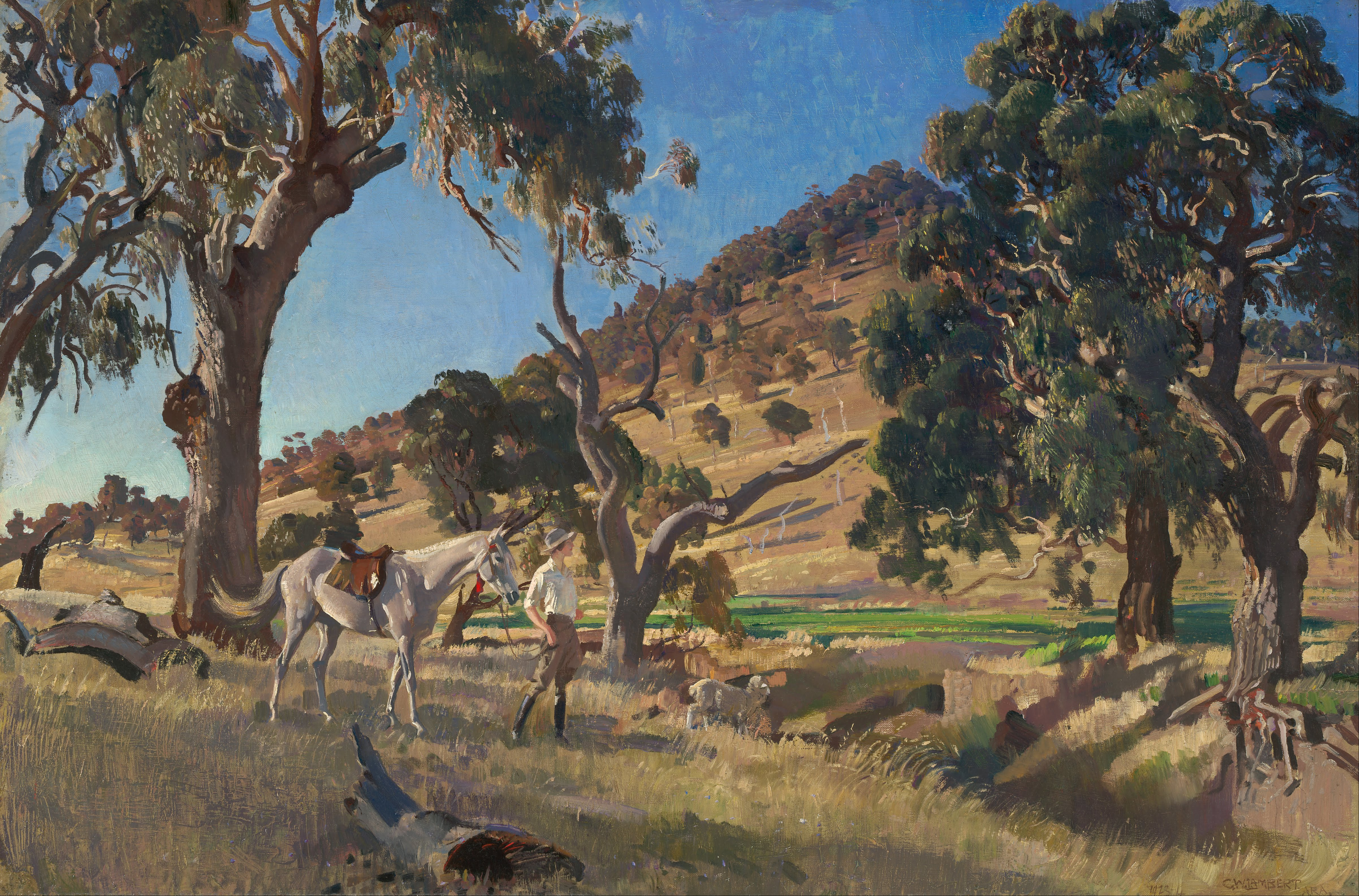
The Squatter's Daughter, painting by George Washington Lambert

The squattocracy have historically retained close ties to Britain. Many families retained properties in both Britain and Australia, often retiring to Britain after making their fortune and leaving vast stretches of land to be controlled by hired staff or younger sons.

Prominent Australian families from the squattocracy include:

- The Dangar family, who by 1850 held 300,000 acres (1,200 km^{2}) of grazing properties and town allotments, with the family business involving Henry Dangar and his brothers. As well as land holdings in the Hunter Valley, properties in Newcastle and business partnerships, the Dangar family became involved in manufacturing and shipping.
- The Kidman family, who held 107,000 mi^{2} (280,000 km^{2}) worth of land in central Australia, founded by Sidney Kidman. Living relatives include Nicole Kidman. The family sold the business S. Kidman & Co, reduced to 38,610 square miles in 2016, for $386m to mining magnate Gina Reinhardt and Chinese interests.
- The Ellis family of South Australia.
- The Forrest family of Western Australia, who have produced a number of conservative politicians for the Liberal Party; Alexander Forrest, David Forrest, John Forrest (Western Australia's first premier) and Mervyn Forrest. The mining businessman Andrew Forrest is a member of this family.
- The Gilbert family of South Australia.
- The Baillieu family of Victoria, who were awarded the title of Baron's Baillieu in recognition for the contributions to Australian society made by the politician and financier Sir Clive Baillieu, son of William Baillieu, after whom the Baillieu library at Melbourne University is named.

== Cultural resonances ==
Literature: The power of the squatters, including their affinity with the police, is referenced in Banjo Paterson's "Waltzing Matilda", Australia's most famous folk song.

Clara Morison by Catherine Helen Spence explores the power of Australia to transform those with a lowly social station in Britain into the Aristocracy of a new world.

Mary Theresa Vidal's 1860 novel Bengala is an Austenesque social comedy exploring the evolution of the pseudo-aristocratic manners which define the squattocracy.

In Miss Fisher's Murder Mysteries, the title character, The Honourable Phryne Fisher, is resistant to her class and acts as a contrast to her Aunt Prudence, who typifies grazier and squattocracy snobbery.

The film Australia deals with the failure of many large grazier properties in the mid-twentieth century, as well as the Squattocracy's close historic links with the British Aristocracy, with whom they frequently intermarried. The film's star, Nicole Kidman, is herself a relative of the prominent squatter family the Kidmans, who, at the height of their power, held 107,000 square miles of land in Central Australia.

The strategy board game Squatter is named for the term.

== See also ==
- Bunyip aristocracy
- Pastoralism
- Adverse possession
