= Christopher Pemberton Hodgson =

English explorer and writer (1821–1865)

Christopher Pemberton Hodgson (1821–1865) was an English colonial pastoralist, traveller and writer.

== Life ==
He was the son of Edward Hodgson, vicar of Rickmansworth, and his third wife Charlotte Pemberton.

Hodgson emigrated from England to New South Wales in 1840. He remained in Australia for five years, and accompanied several exploring expeditions into the interior. He observed the grass burning on the Darling Downs. After a short stay in England he travelled through Egypt and Abyssinia, made two journeys to Arabia, and visited Ceylon.

From 15 October 1851 to 17 March 1855 Hodgson acted as unpaid vice-consul at Pau, in south-west France, where he interested himself in local history and antiquities. He subsequently was appointed vice-consul at Caen, where he remained for two years.

On 18 June 1859 Hodgson became officiating consul at Nagasaki, Japan. In October of that year he moved to Hakodate, where he had charge of French as well as English interests. He remained in Japan till March 1861.

Hodgson then resided mainly at Pau, where he died on 11 October 1865.

== Conflict with Aboriginals in Australia ==
Christopher Hodgson, together with his brother Arthur Hodgson, squatted the second British pastoral run on the Darling Downs in what is now known as south-eastern Queensland. They named this property Eton Vale after Eton College, the illustrious school they both attended in England. In his 1846 publication, Reminiscences of Australia with Hints on the Squatters' Life, Hodgson describes the conflict involved in the taking of land ownership from Aboriginal Australians. The land of grassy plains they marked out was in the possession of the Barunggam people and Hodgson recorded in some detail his "constant skirmishes with the natives" to wrest control of the area.

Hodgson writes that in retaliation to the 35 white men who were killed by Aboriginals in the Darling Downs district in the four years he was there, "so many hundreds of these poor creatures have been sacrificed" in return. He regularly admits having an active role in the killings and being "their enemy and for 3 years, a bitter one". Hodgson describes his head station house as being decorated with "swords, guns and..all around are displayed spears, boomerangs..dillies and calabashes, the spoil of a hard fought battle or a surprised camp of natives." He had insights on the correctness of this process but was adamant in the divine right of the British to take the land from the savage and any attempts to understand the indigenous population were in vain. He asked of the reader, "who would not rather put a ball in their hearts to rid themselves of their ceremonials and presence at once?"

Various methods of conflict on both sides are recounted in the book. When searching for Aboriginals they deemed in need of punishment, Hodgson and his party of vigilantes would go to high ground and discover the location of the natives from the rising smoke of their evening campfires. They would travel discreetly to a nearer proximity to the camp and then attack early in the morning. In other punitive missions, Hodgson would "generally employ our [black] boys from distant tribes to act as trackers" to locate defiant Aboriginals. Sometimes a prisoner was taken and "ordered to conduct us to his own camp on risk of his life," and once at this camp, "we rushed to attack it and we had, notwithstanding, ample revenge." Hodgson even describes how the Aboriginals would try to recover "the corpses of those who had fallen victims to the white man's gun in defiance of a sentry on the lookout to give notice of such a visit." Those Barunggam who were at peace with the Hodgson brothers, were kept in line with methods such as the taking of young boys from the tribe as hostages. The Barunggam, lacking European weapons of war, would deploy other tactics to exploit known weaknesses of the British. Hodgson relates, "when at war with the white man, the [native women] were always pushed forward and sent to reconnoitre; the men knowing that we have a sincere respect for the sex." This respect included knowing that the trade for the services of a native woman was a tomahawk.

Towards the end of his book, Hodgson postulates that "if England recognises [the natives] as human beings, she will exert herself to amend their situation, otherwise they must be shot, if she considers them, as many do, a species of simia acaudata or tail-less monkey, of course they will be hunted down and exterminated."

== Works ==
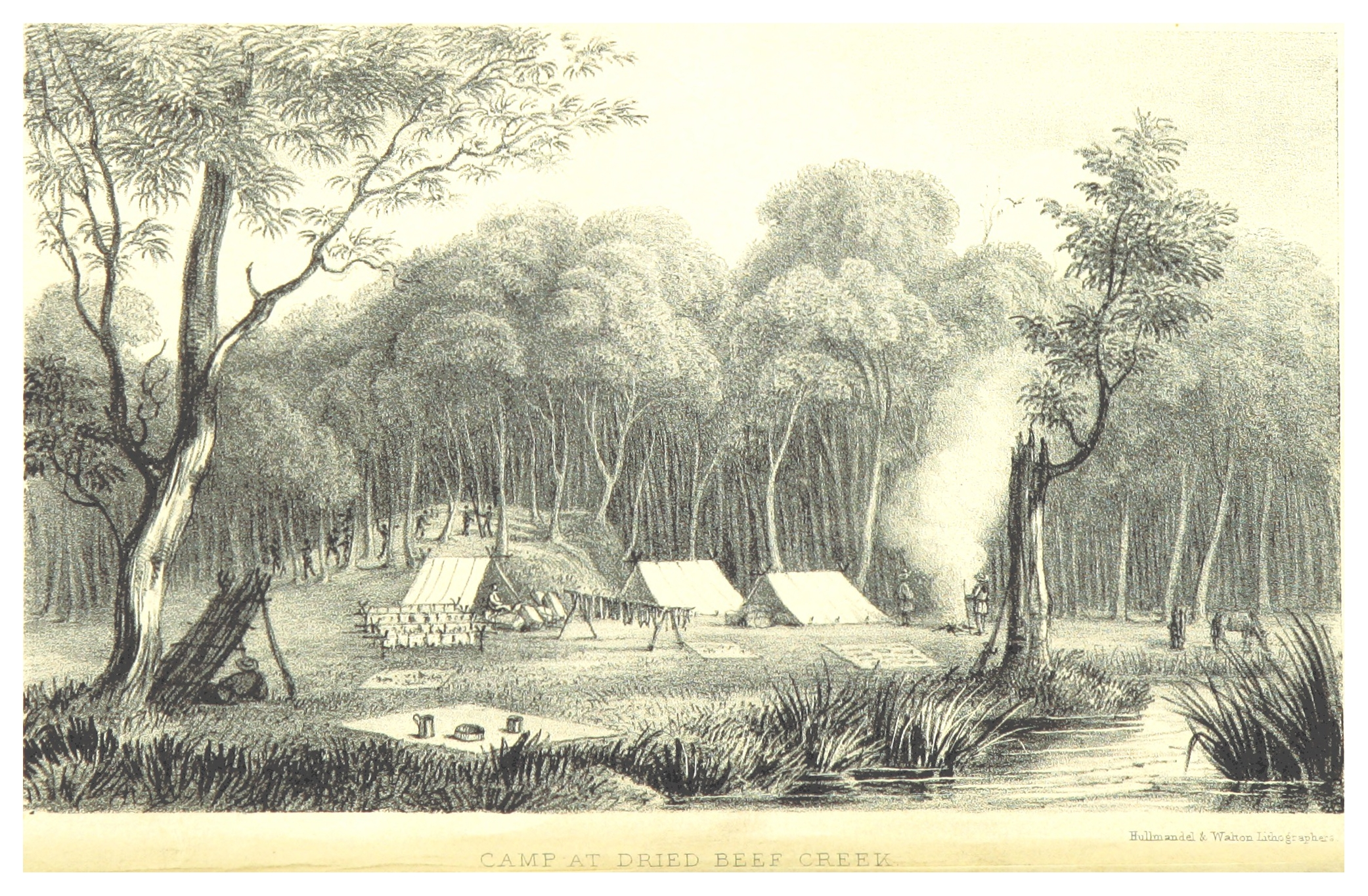
"Camp at Dried Beef Creek", illustration from Christopher Pemberton Hodgson, Reminiscences of Australia, with Hints on the Squatters' Life (1846)

Hodgson wrote the following, all published in London:

- Reminiscences of Australia, with Hints on the Squatters' Life (1846)
- El Ydaiour: a Book of Eastern Travel (1849)
- The Wanderer and other Poems (1849), verse
- Pyrenaica; a History of the Viscounts of Béarn to the Death of Henry IV, with a Life of that Monarch (1855)
- A Residence at Nagasaki and Hakodate in 1859–1861, with an Account of Japan generally (1861), dedicated to Joseph Hooker, who wrote an appendix on Japanese plants.

== Family ==
Hodgson was married, and his wife had letters in Residence at Nagasaki and Hakodate.

== Legacy ==
Hodgson Creek and Hodgson Vale near Toowoomba are named after Christopher and Arthur Hodgson.

== Notes ==
Attribution

This article incorporates text from a publication now in the public domain: Lee, Sidney, ed. (1891). "Hodgson, Christopher Pemberton". Dictionary of National Biography. Vol. 27. London: Smith, Elder & Co.
