= Arthur Whittingham =

The Hon Arthur Whittingham
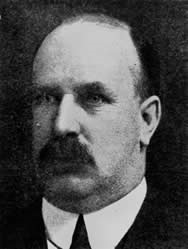

Member of the Queensland Legislative Council
- In office 1 July 1912 – 23 March 1922

Personal details
- Born: Arthur Herbert Whittingham; 20 September 1869 Dunedin, New Zealand
- Died: 20 June 1927 (aged 57) Brisbane, Queensland, Australia
- Resting place: Toowong Cemetery
- Spouse: Cecile Viva Condamine Taylor (m.1913 died 1972)
- Occupation: Grazier

Arthur Herbert Whittingham (20 September 1869 – 20 June 1927) was an Australian grazier, and member of the Queensland Legislative Council.

== Early life ==
Of Shropshire heritage, Whittingham was born in September 1869 at Dunedin, New Zealand, to George Whittingham, merchant, and his wife Selina (née Davidson). Around 1871, his family moved to Victoria, Australia where his father became a principal of Whittingham Bros, a pastoral firm that had holdings in several states. He attended Kew High School before attending Geelong Grammar School and in 1887, Whittingham studied arts at Trinity Hall, Cambridge. He next studied medicine at London University but after three years his studies were interrupted due to the deaths of his father and elder brother and Whittingham headed back to Australia to look after the family's business interests.

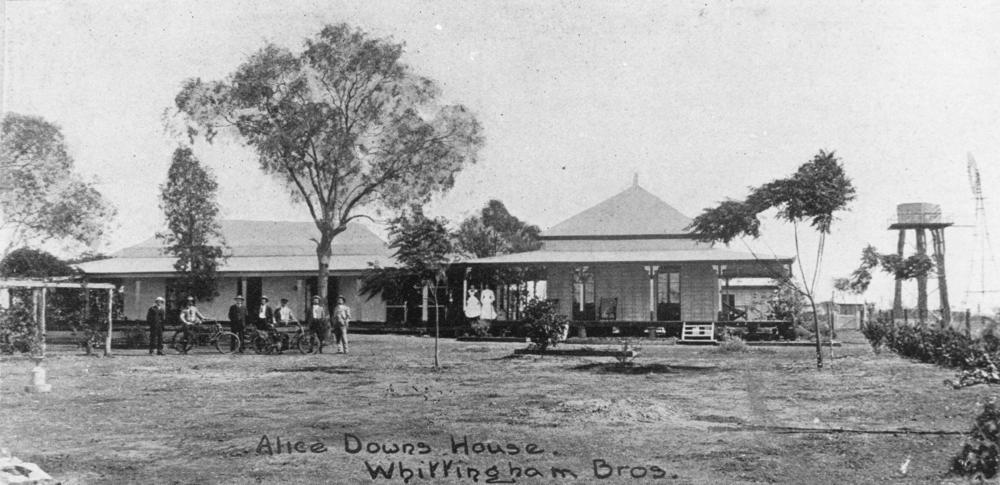
The Whittingham Homestead at Alice Downs Station, 1908

In 1901, Whittingham was sent to manage Alice Downs, a property near Blackall that his father and brother, John had taken up in 1878. Along with another brother, Harold, he bought the property in 1903 and in 1909, after buying out Harold's interest, became sole owner of the run. He had stocked the property with 80,000 Merino sheep but land resumptions of the property to meet the increasing nearby population led to purchasing several more properties in Central Queensland.

== Political career ==
Having been Chairman of the Kargoolnah Shire Council and a member of the Barcoo Marsupial Board, Whittingham's first attempt at entering state politics was at the 1907 state election, where, as an independent Ministerial candidate, he contested the electoral district of Barcoo and was soundly defeated by the sitting member, George Kerr.

Whittingham was called to the Legislative Council on 1 July 1912, serving for the next 10 years until the council was abolished in 1922. During his time in the council, he was bitterly opposed to the Labor Government's changes to the land Acts and to plans to abolish the council which eventually took place in March 1922, ending his political career.

He was a founding member of the Queensland Recruiting Committee during World War I.

== Personal life ==
At St John's Cathedral in Brisbane, on 4 June 1913, Whittingham married Cecile Viva Condamine Taylor, the daughter of the late Condamine Taylor, and, after Taylor's death, step-daughter of the late Charles Lumley Hill, a former member of the Legislative Assembly. They lived at Mayfield in the suburb of Hamilton and in the 1920s it became a centre of Brisbane's social activities with Cecile being described as 'Queensland's best dressed woman'.

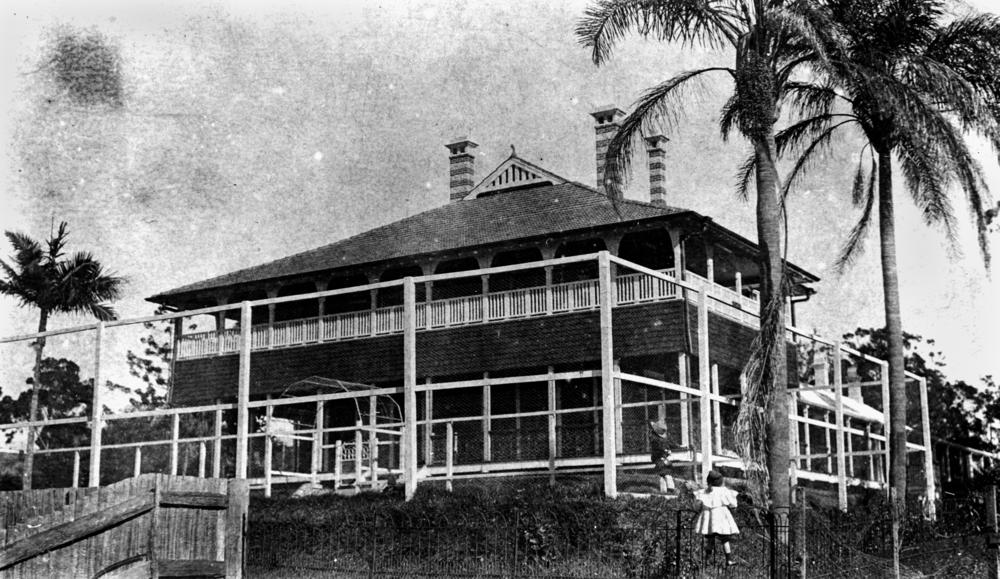
Mayfield, the Whittingham residence in Brisbane, 1910

Whittingham's business career was wide and varied. Along with his pastoral interests, he was a director of The Union Trustee Company, the Blackall Wool Scouring Company, and the Australian Mercantile, Land, and Finance Company. He was a prominent Freemason, belonged to several sporting and cultural clubs, and was patron of the RACQ. For several years Whittingham was consular agent for Italy.

Whittingham died of heart disease at the Mater Misericordiae Private Hospital in June 1927. His funeral was held at St John's Cathedral and proceeded to the Toowong Cemetery. In his will, which was contested by his wife, he left £100,000 to the Geelong Grammar School, and various amounts to many other charities. When Cecile Whittingham died in 1972, the Grammar School received another $221,875.
