= Henry Eric Southey Harben =

English cricketer and British Army officer (1900–1971)

Personal information
- Full name: Henry Eric Southey Harben
- Born: 1 August 1900; Farnham, Surrey, England
- Died: 1 October 1971 (aged 71); Malta
- Batting: Right-handed
- Bowling: Unknown
- Relatives: Francis Ramsay (father-in-law)

Domestic team information
- Years: Team
- 1919: Sussex

Career statistics
| Competition | First-class |
|---|---|
| Matches | 4 |
| Runs scored | 126 |
| Batting average | 21.00 |
| 100s/50s | –/– |
| Top score | 34 |
| Balls bowled | 42 |
| Wickets | – |
| Bowling average | – |
| 5 wickets in innings | – |
| 10 wickets in match | – |
| Best bowling | – |
| Catches/stumpings | –/– |
- Source: Cricinfo, 15 March 2012

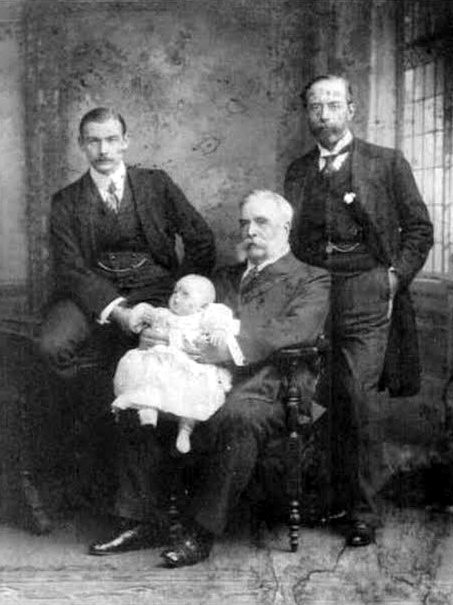
Henry Eric Southey Harben as a child held by his great grandfather Sir Henry Harben (seated) with his grandfather Henry Andrade Harben (right) and his father Henry Devenish Harben (left).

Major Henry Eric Southey Harben (1 August 1900 – 1 October 1971) was an English cricketer. Harben was a right-handed batsman, though his bowling style is unknown.

== Personal life and death ==
The son of Henry Devenish Harben and Agnes Helen Bostock, he was born at Farnham, Surrey.

Harben married Helen Prudence Ramsay, daughter of the cricketer Francis Ramsay, on 5 June 1927, though the couple later divorced. They had two children. He later married Iris Constance Kathleen de Stacpoole, daughter of George Edward Joseph Patrick de Stacpoole, 5th Duc de Stacpoole and Eileen Constance Palmer, on 29 April 1947, with the couple having three children.

By 1970, Harben was living at Clonriff House, Oughterard, County Galway, Ireland. He died in Malta on 1 October 1971, aged 71.

== Army and cricket ==
He graduated as an Officer Cadet from the Royal Military College, Sandhurst in 1919, entering the 1st King's Dragoon Guards with the rank of 2nd Lieutenant on 16 July 1919. In that same year Harben made his first-class debut for Sussex against Surrey in 1919 County Championship. He made three further first-class appearances for the county in that season, the last of which came against Kent. In his four first-class matches for Sussex, he scored 126 runs at a batting average of 21.00, with a high score of 34.

== Politics ==
He was Liberal Party candidate for the Watford division of Hertfordshire at the 1945 General Election. He came third and did not stand for parliament again.
