= Francis Ramsay (cricketer) =

English cricketer and pastoralist

Personal information
- Full name: Marmaduke Francis Ramsay
- Born: 8 December 1860; Cheltenham, Gloucestershire, England
- Died: 31 December 1947 (aged 87); Canterbury, Kent, England
- Batting: Right-handed
- Bowling: Right-arm medium
- Relatives: Robert Ramsay (brother); Henry Harben (son-in-law)

Domestic team information
- Years: Team
- 1892/93–1899/00: Queensland
- 1894: Marylebone Cricket Club

Career statistics
Competition	First-class
Matches	4
Runs scored	170
Batting average	21.25
100s/50s	–/1
Top score	58
Balls bowled	512
Wickets	9
Bowling average	20.22
5 wickets in innings	–
10 wickets in match	–
Best bowling	4/61
Catches/stumpings	3/–
- Source: Cricinfo, 30 April 2021

Marmaduke Francis Ramsay JP (8 December 1860 – 31 December 1947) was an English first-class cricketer and a pastoralist in Queensland.

The son of Robert Ramsay, he was born at Cheltenham in December 1860. His father had pastoral interests in Queensland, with Ramsay travelling with his family to Australia. There he was educated at Ipswich Grammar School. Upon the families return to England in 1874, he attended Harrow School. From Harrow he went up to Trinity Hall, Cambridge. Despite being an avid cricketer, he never represented Cambridge University Cricket Club in first-class cricket, but did play minor matches for the club.

Ramsay returned to Australia in 1880 to gain pastoral experience at Wellshot Station, before proceeding to take over the management of Eton Vale. His brother, Robert, joined him in 1883 and together the pair made a series of land acquisitions in North West Queensland. They formed the Ramsay Bros partnership to manage these stations, partnering alongside Sir Arthur Hodgson. The partnership acquired Hodgson's 1,027 sq mi (2,659.92 km^{2}) share of Oondooroo Station in 1887 and they quickly modernised into the most progressively run station in North West Queensland. Their partnership with Hodgson at Eton Vale was dissolved in 1893, with the land partitioned between the Ramsay's and Hogdson, with the Ramsay's share being renamed 'Harrow'.

An avoid sportsman, Ramsay played club cricket for Toowoomba and Darling Downs, though his pastoral interests limited his club appearances. He played first-class cricket for Queensland against New South Wales in 1893 and 1894, captaining the team in the 1894 fixture. He visited England in 1894, playing a first-class match for the Marylebone Cricket Club (MCC) against Leicestershire at Lord's, making a half century batting at number nine in the MCC second innings. He also played minor matches for the Kent second eleven, but did not feature for the county's first eleven. Remaining in England in 1895, he met and married Alice Katherine Angélique Waterfield at Canterbury Cathedral, with the couple going on to have six children. He returned to Australia and played for Toowoomba XVIII in November 1897 against a touring English side captained by Andrew Stoddart, with Ramsay excelling in the match by taking a five wicket haul. He made a further first-class appearance for Queensland against New South Wales in 1899, capturing the wicket of Victor Trumper in the match. As a cricketer, he was described by the Australian Dictionary of Biography as "an indifferent right-hand batsman, he proved an economical right-arm, medium-pace bowler, but his action was sometimes questioned by critics".

He retired to England in 1907, leaving his pastoral interests to his brother. In later life he bred racehorses and took up fishing and golf. He was also a justice of the peace for Kent. Ramsay lived in Canterbury at Lee Priory, dying there on New Year's Eve in 1947; he was survived by wife, four daughters and a son, with his eldest son John having died of wounds in the First World War.
