= Queensland Recruiting Committee =

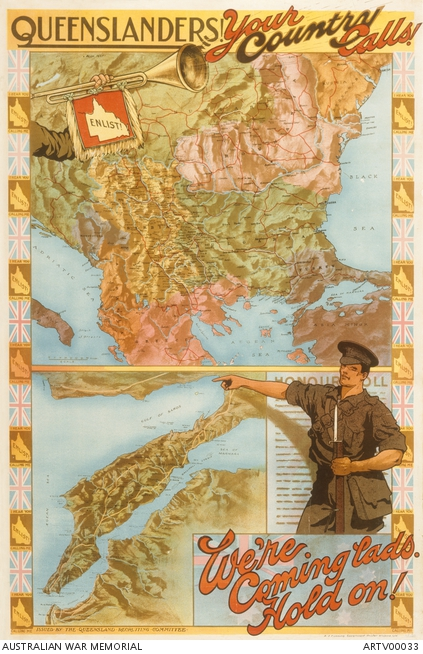
Recruiting poster, 1915

The Queensland Recruiting Committee was a volunteer organisation in Queensland, Australia, which urged Queensland men to enlist for military service during World War I. It operated from May 1915 to December 1916, when it was replaced by an Australian Government recruitment organisation, the Queensland State Recruiting Committee.

== History ==
On 28 May 1915, a meeting was held at the Brisbane Town Hall, chaired by Brisbane mayor George Down, to discuss ways to encourage able-bodied men to enlist in the Australian Imperial Force to fight in World War I. The decision of the meeting was to create the Queensland Recruiting Committee, the first recruitment committee established in Australia. Unlike in other states, the Queensland Recruitment Committee was not a government organisation but rather an independent and privately funded organisation with volunteer members.

The immediate actions of the committee were to take advantage of a march down Queen Street the following day by establishing two temporary recruiting booths, one in front of the Town Hall and one in front of the Brisbane General Post Office. The committee also decided to establish a permanent recruiting booth in Queen Street.

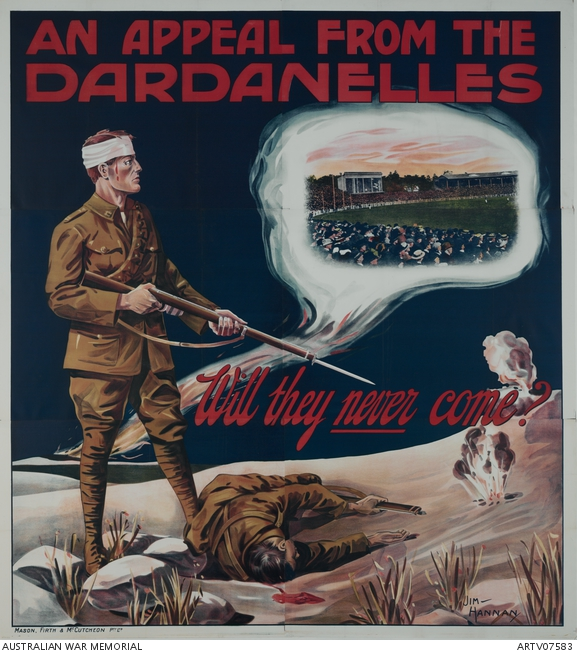
"An appeal from the Dardanelles: Will they never come?" poster widely distributed in Queensland

The initial belief of the committee was that their role was primarily one of education; young men would enlist if they understood the issues at stake and the need for their service. Local recruiting committees were also established in local government areas and other committees were formed to support the war effort, e.g. the University of Queensland had a University War Committee.

In October 1915, the Queensland Recruiting Committee become a sub-committee of the Queensland War Council when the council was established in September 1915.

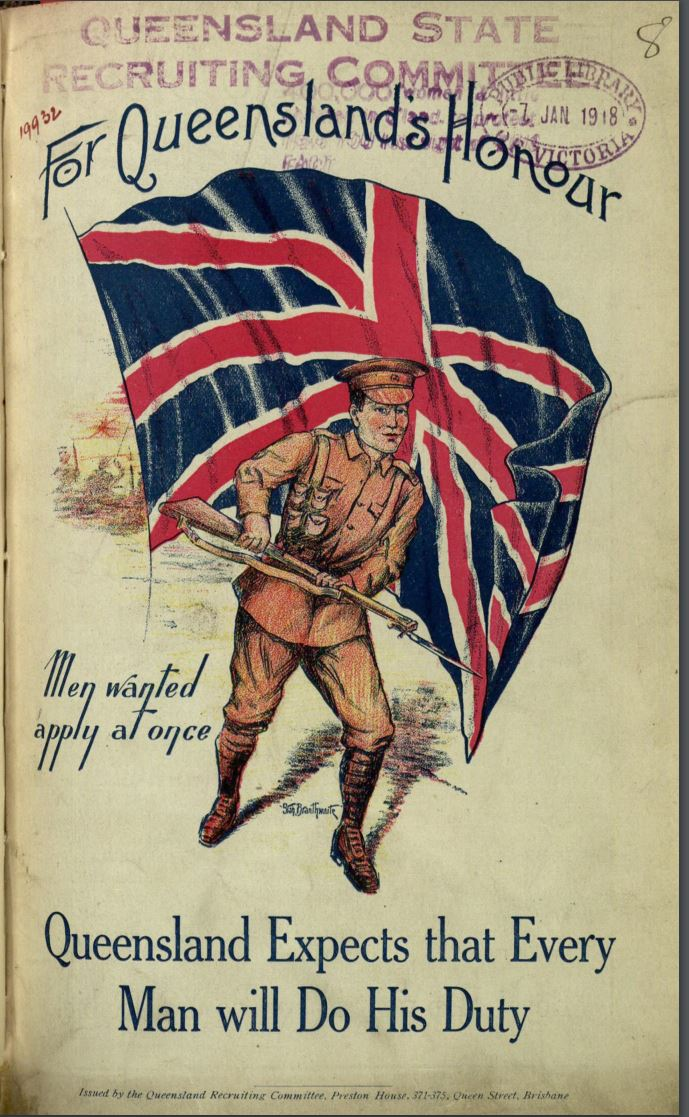
Cover page of the booklet "For Queensland's Honour: Queensland Expects that Every Man will Do His Duty", 1916

As part of the education campaign, the committee commissioned cartoons for use in newspapers, posters for railway stations and a set of lantern slides which would be shown each day at the 20 picture theatres operated by Birch Carroll & Coyle. The committee also distributed promotional material developed in other states, sending several hundred copies of Victorian poster "Will They Never Come?" to every Queensland town. Another educational initiative was the publication of a 16-page booklet entitled "For Queensland's Honour: Queensland expects that every man will do his duty", providing a mix of motivational and practical information (rates of pay and training) for potential recruits. It also includes an additional verse added to the national anthem of God Save the King as follows:

God save our splendid men
Send them safe home again
God save our men
Keep them victorious
Patient and chivalrous
They are so dear to us
God save our men.

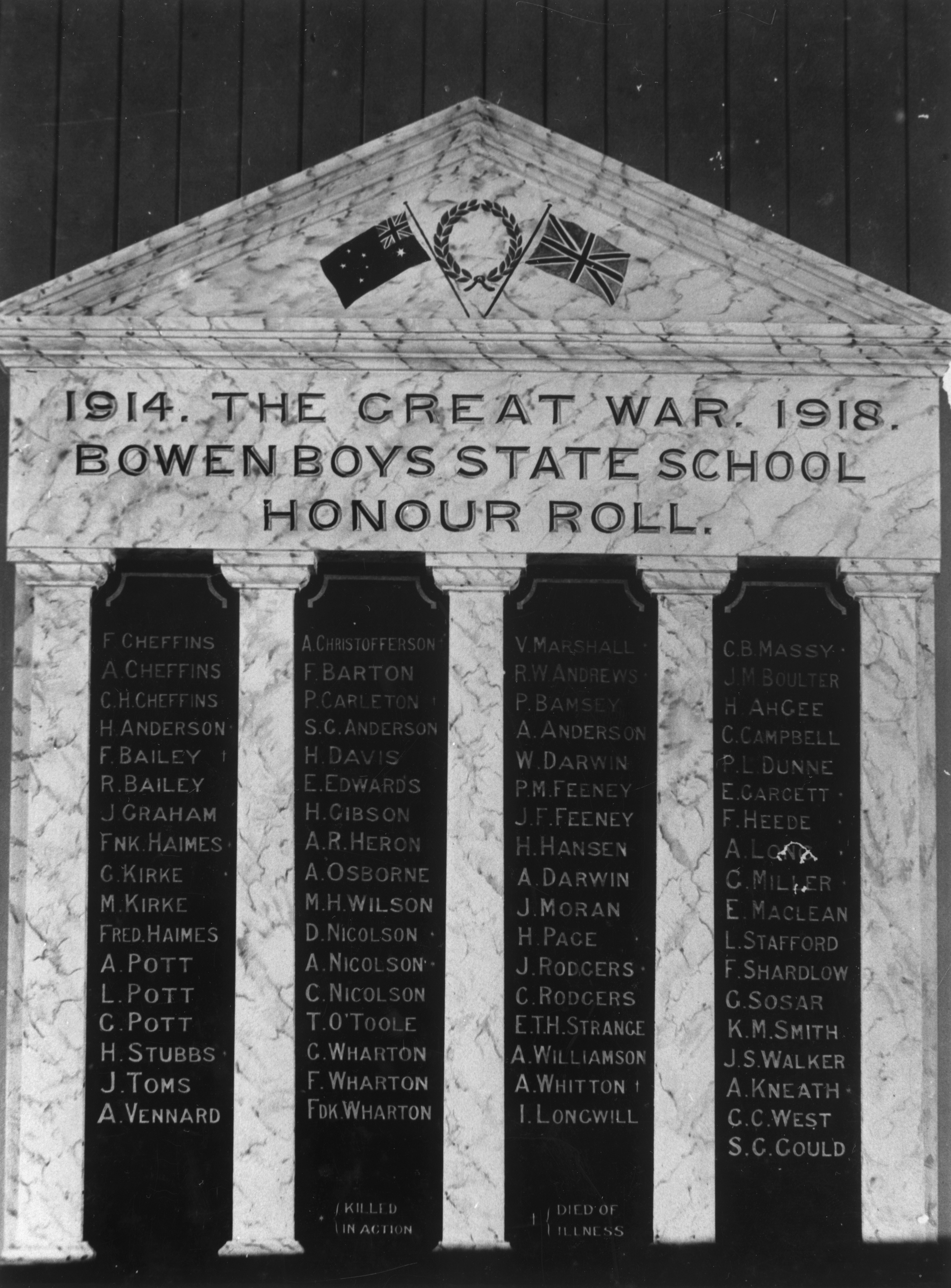
World War I Honour Roll at Bowen Boys State School

The committee was also involved in holding recruitment meetings of various kinds and coordinated with local recruiting committee to provide inspirational addresses by prominent citizens. Religious leaders of all faiths were also asked to appeal for volunteers to enlist as part of religious services. The committee asked each Queensland school to maintain a roll of honour listing those former pupils and teachers who had enlisted.

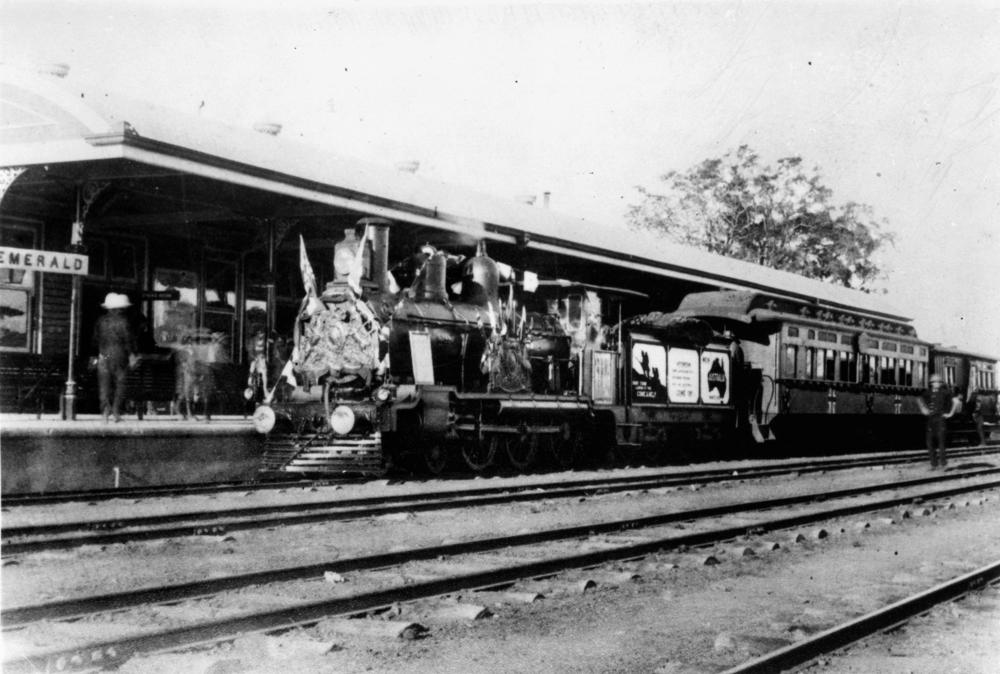
Decorated recruiting train stopped Emerald

In August 1915, five trains were borrowed from the Queensland Government to use for a country recruiting drive with school children to be given a holiday on the day the train came to their town. Each train was fitted out as a recruiting depot with a doctor and a recruiting sergeant as well as carrying politicians and members of the Queensland Recruiting Committee to give speeches. At each town, the local mayor organised for people to attend the recruiting rally at the station as the train arrived. The trains travelled to destinations such as:

- Brisbane to Roma and Charleville
- Brisbane to Goondiwindi
- Brisbane to Bundaberg and Gladstone
- Rockhampton to Longreach
- Townsville to Charters Towers and Cloncurry

stopping at many smaller towns along the way and taking a number of branch lines along the route.

The committee also took action on reasons why men might be reluctant to enlist. The committee had a campaign to get employers to commit to re-employing any staff members who enlisted and to otherwise give priority to employing returned servicemen.

In October 1915, the committee organised for the first recruiting film to be shown in Queensland, which showed the conditions in which recruits would live and was hoped would convince those who may have listened to the "anti-recruiters" misrepresenting the conditions.

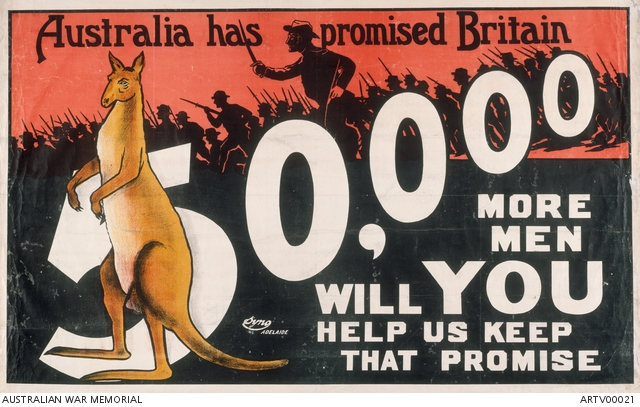
"Australia has promised Britain 50,000 more men" recruitment poster

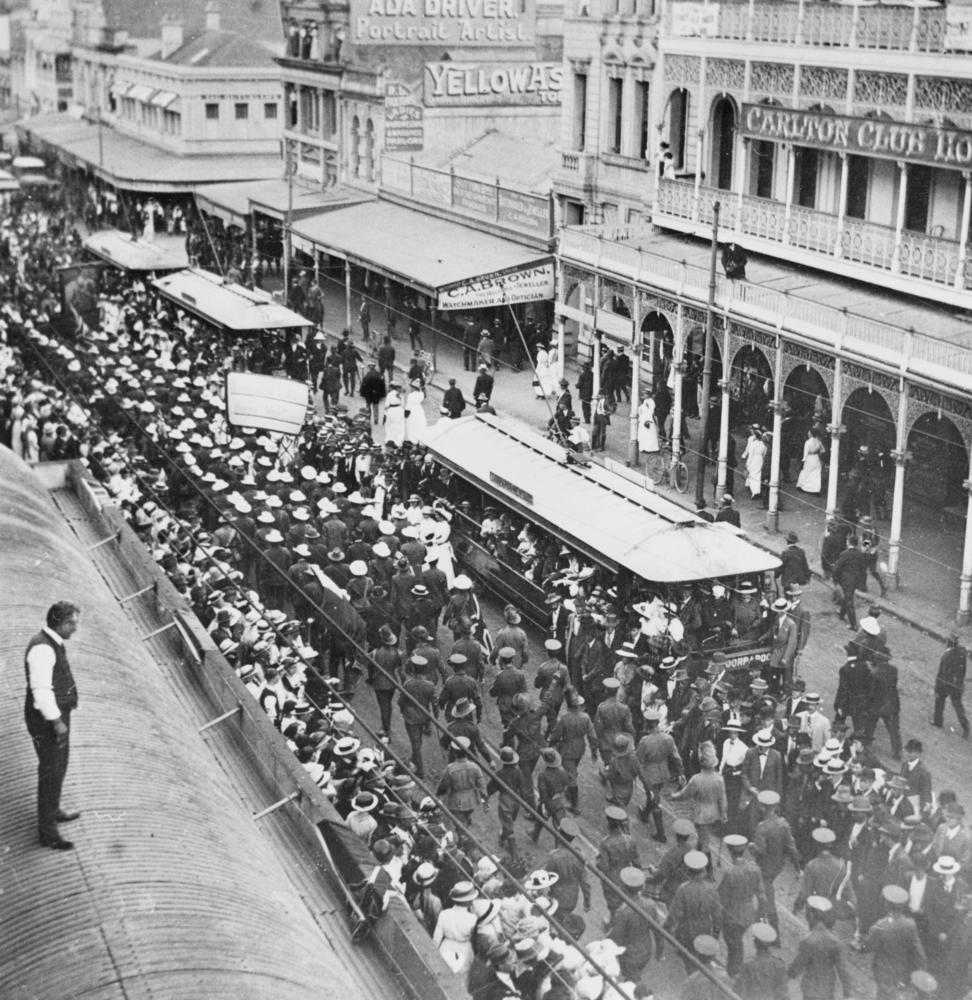
March of the Dungarees arrives at Queen Street, Brisbane, 1915

In November 1915, the committee organised a snowball march, the March of the Dungarees, from Warwick to Brisbane. The march began at Warwick with 28 men and followed the Southern railway line through Toowoomba, Laidley, and Ipswich to its destination in Brisbane, gathering 125 recruits along the way. Despite the strong support for the march shown along the route by the townsfolk, the Brisbane Courier expressed disappointment in the overall numbers of men recruited, given the high recruitment expectations demanded by the Australian Government. However, the Courier praised those who had enlisted through the march as "splendid" "high-spirited patriots" in contrast to the "lethargic" "craven" "slackers" who were able to enlist but did not heed the call.

On 26 November 1915, the new Prime Minister, Billy Hughes, promised Britain 50,000 more soldiers. Towards the end of 1915, the Australian Government initiated a war census. Every man between the age of 18 and 44 had to send their reply by 1 March 2016.

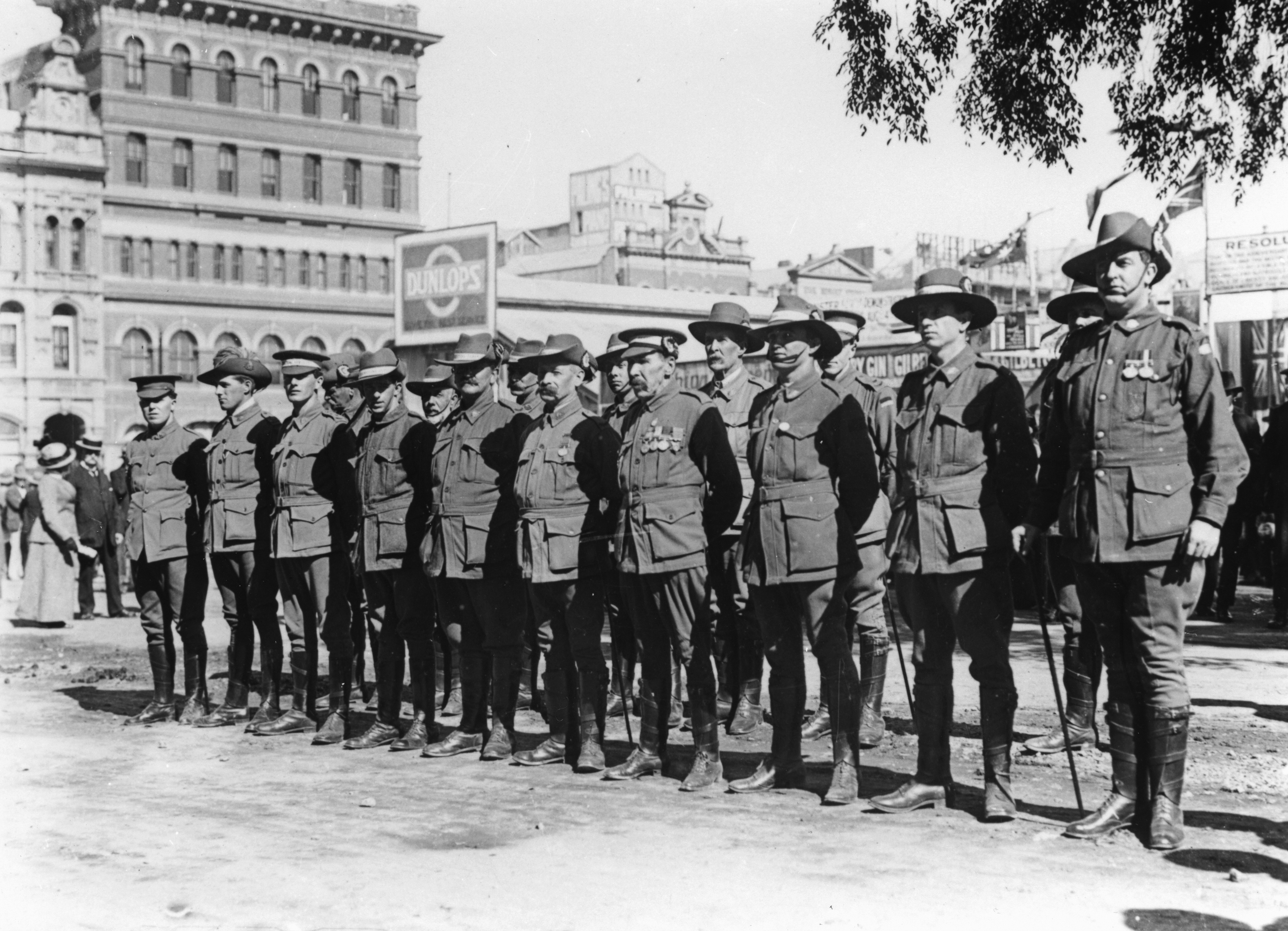
Recruiting sergeants in Brisbane, 1916

By early 1916, the Queensland Recruiting Committee was seeking new ways to attract recruits. Recruiting sergeants were appointed to many country districts. The committee also advertised that it would arrange for a recruiting sergeant and military band to attend for any local "patriotic entertainment". Recruiting sergeants were either returned servicemen or older men (ineligible for military service) with enlisted sons, to demonstrate their personal commitment to military service during the war.

It was hoped that holding Anzac Day ceremonies in Queensland on 25 April 1916 (the first anniversary of the Gallipoli landings) would encourage recruitment. The committee initiated a public meeting in Brisbane to form a local Anzac Day committee to organise the event and, following the success of that meeting, decided to contact mayors in every town to establish a local organisation committees to conduct some suitable public meeting to mark the occasion. Although the Queensland Recruiting Committee allowed the local committees to make their own arrangements, they stipulated that the day should focus on the commemoration of fallen soldiers and the honouring of those serving and that there should be no fund-raising. They also asked that all people should stand for a minute's silence at 9pm throughout the state. The committee also called on all religious denominations to mark the day with an appropriate religious service. One of the local initiatives was the Cane Beetles March, a snowball match from Bartle Frere to Cairns, arriving in time to take part in the Anzac Day march in Cairns.

In March 1916, it was decided to allow the enlistment of men born within the British Empire but whose fathers were born in enemy nations if the local recruiting committee were unanimous in attesting to the loyalty of the recruit.

The Queensland Recruiting Committee was tasked with processing the war census returns in Queensland. Many men and women volunteered their time to help process the returns and organisations donated space and refreshments and small gifts of thanks for these volunteers. To encourage frank disclosure, all those involved in processing the returns had to sign a document pledging strict secrecy. However, there was some concerns created in relation to whether the Queensland committee or the local committee should process the replies. Some local committees felt they would have a better understanding of local situations; others did not want the workload. Meanwhile, the Queensland committee believed that some men would not wish their circumstances to become known to other local people. By March 1916, 113,00 war census returns had been received from the 140,000 expected and up to 70 volunteers a day were working on classifying the returns.

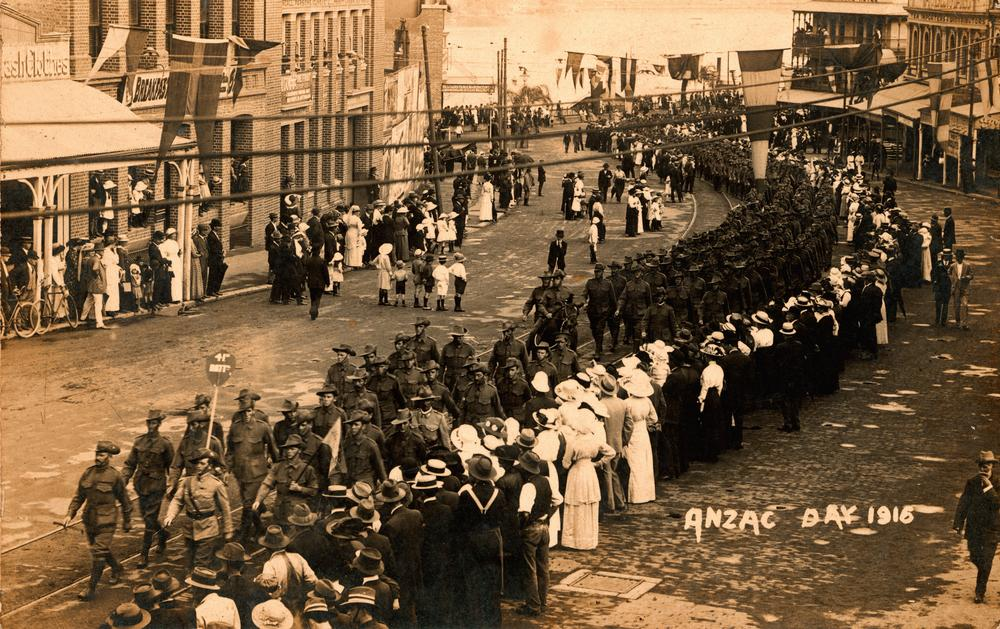
Anzac Day procession through the streets of Brisbane, 1916

After the Anzac Day ceremonies, the committee launched three large recruitment rallies in Brisbane, in the belief that men would more ready to enlist after that day of reflection.

By May 1916 the Queensland Recruiting Committee had created a centralised and cross-referenced filing system. This filing system provided the Committee with detailed records of 120,000 eligible males in Queensland and used a classification system to show availability in terms of family responsibilities, work commitments and other factors. This enabled recruitment to be much more focussed, enabling the committee to initiate follow-up enquiries to those who might be eligible to serve by local recruiting committees and recruiting sergeants.

In June 1916, the committee organised a march of school children in Brisbane on Friday 9 June, accompanied by school bands and the singing of patriotic songs by the children, while distributing handbills urging enlistment. Over two thousand children from 19 schools participated having between them over 9,500 of their fathers, brothers, uncles and cousins already enlisted. However, only 10 men enlisted at the recruitment station that night. Despite the effort going into recruitment activities, fewer recruits were coming forward with some country districts reporting no new recruits and many local recruiting committees doubting they could meet their targets of volunteer recruits; increasingly the discussion turned to the possibility of conscription. It seemed that "nothing but compulsory service would bring in the shirkers". By July 1916, Queensland recruitment was at 250 men per week, a third of the level of only two months earlier. Also, some districts such as Lowood which had a strong German heritage were running short of eligible "Britishers". In July 1916, the enlistment of men with fathers born in enemy countries was further relaxed to allow enlistment if a majority of the local recruiting committee would attest to their loyalty (rather than a unanimous opinion).

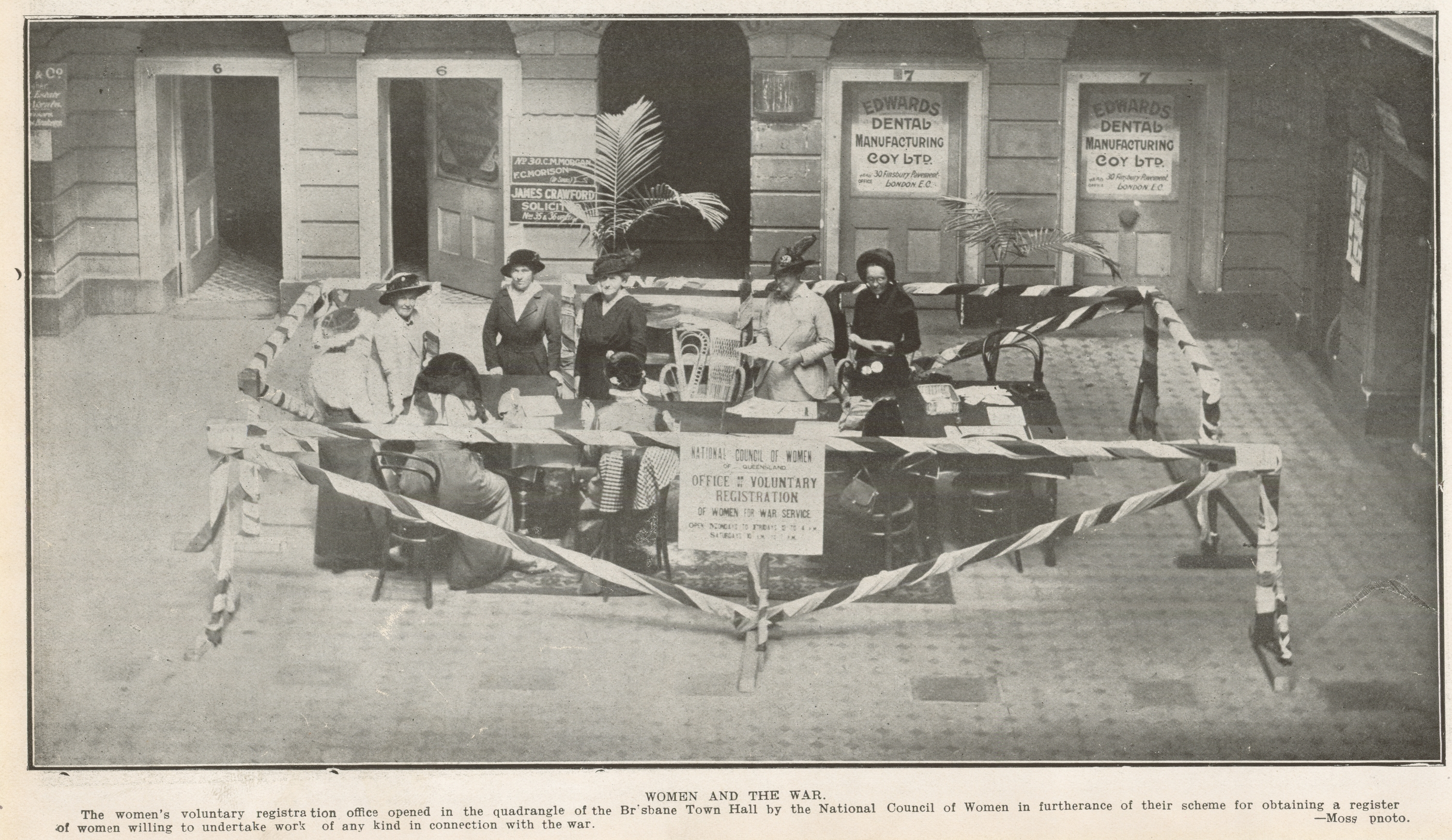
The women's voluntary registration office opened in the quadrangle of the Brisbane Town Hall by the National Council of Women in furtherance of their scheme for obtaining a register of women willing to undertake work of any kind in connection with the war, September 1915

On Monday 14 August 1916, the Queensland Recruiting Committee convened a conference of local recruiting committees in Brisbane. The committee's filing system had identified approximately 30,000 single fit men who should be able to enlist. But in September 1916, it was announced that Queensland recruitment had fallen even lower being roughly one-seventh of the increasing levels demanded by the Australian Government. A poll of the local recruiting committees showed 95% recommended conscription. However, the Queensland Government declared it was opposed to conscription. Although some members of the Queensland Recruiting Committee were strongly in favour of conscription, the committee did not take an official position on conscription either way. Indeed, it was unclear if their role as a subcommittee of the Queensland Government's War Council allowed them have an independent position. The committee was also concerned that the growing public debate on conscription was distracting attention from the need for ongoing recruitment. Nonetheless, in the anticipation of conscription being legislated by the Australian Government, the Committee wrote to major employers asking them to consider which men in their employment might be most likely to be called up for service and encouraged them to contact the National Council of Women of Queensland see how women might be employed to make up for the conscripted men. If employers were to "devote a little time to instruct female workers", the committee felt they could undertake work in offices, retailing, and manufacturing. It also advised local recruiting committees (who were not subordinate to the Queensland War Council) to prepare to campaign for conscription.

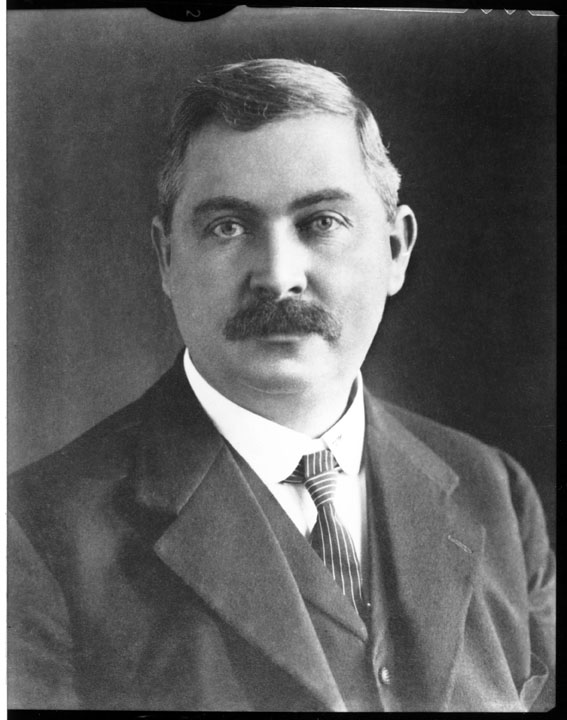
Queensland Premier, Thomas Joseph Ryan, circa 1912

Meanwhile, Premier T. J. Ryan was subject to ongoing criticism that he had not enlisted himself despite being a man of suitable age. In discussing the completion of his war census card in January 1916, Ryan "hedged" his answer saying "there is great room for difference of opinion as to the best way to serve the Empire". In March 1916, when Ryan addressed a recruiting railly in Rockhampton urging men to enlist, a heckler in the crowd called out "I will go with you tomorrow" to which Ryan responded "I am prepared to go tomorrow" and claimed he had indicated his willingness to serve on his war census card. In August 1916, when pressed on his willingness to enlist, Ryan deflected the question suggesting that the proof was to be found in correspondence between him and the Queensland Recruiting Committee, but that the committee would have to agree to the release of the correspondence. Later in early October 1916, Ryan defended himself by producing a letter dated 18 March 1916 from Andrew Thynne, as chairman of the Queensland Recruiting Committee, withdrawing Ryan's call-up letter due to "the importance of your duties as Premier of the State and of your intended visit on public business to England". However, Thynne presented a different version of events in which Ryan had approached Thynne to get his call-up withdrawn because of the impending visit. In Thynne's view, now that the visit was completed "There is nothing now that I know of to prevent Mr Ryan from enlisting". Ryan then accused Thynne of "wilfully misrepresenting" their conversation.

Although it was constitutionally possible for the Australian Government to have introduced conscription, it was a controversial move to do so in the face of considerable opposition demonstrated by the public and politicians. Therefore, the Australian Prime Minister, Billy Hughes, decided to hold a plebiscite on 28 October 1916 to obtain a symbolic mandate from the Australian people. On Wednesday 4 October 1916, Hughes came to Brisbane to speak in support of the conscription plebiscite at the Exhibition Hall. On Sunday 15 October 1916, the Queensland Treasurer, Ted Theodore, spoke at Warwick opposing conscription, saying, amongst other things, that voluntary recruitment had only failed because of "the incompetency and blundering mismanagement of the Queensland Recruiting Committee who had discouraged voluntary enlistment". The committee requested Theodore withdraw or explain his remarks, pointing out that, as a member of the Queensland Cabinet, he would have received regular briefings on the work of the committee yet had never raised any concerns. Furthermore, the work of the committee had been praised by the Federal Government including the Governor-General who described the committee as "the finest organisation of its kind in the Commonwealth".

The outcome of the conscription plebiscite was a majority "No" vote, meaning voluntary recruitment had to continue. However, how that was to be achieved was unclear to the recruitment committees. The Federal Government decided that recruitment should be coordinated directly by the Federal Government with a hierarchical structure of local committees, state committees and a federal committee all under the direction of a Federal Director-General of Recruitment, Donald Mackinnon. Although it was noted that the existing Queensland recruiting arrangements were already arranged in this way, the federal scheme involved the creation of a new Queensland State Recruiting Committee chaired by Captain George Macdonald Dash and the Queensland Recruiting Committee was to "retire" after passing on information on the methods they had used for recruitment. Mackinnon thanked the Queensland Recruiting Committee for the "great zeal" it had shown.

On Thursday 14 December 1916, the Queensland Recruitment Committee held its final meeting, in which its members offered their services in any way that might assist the new committee.

== Membership ==
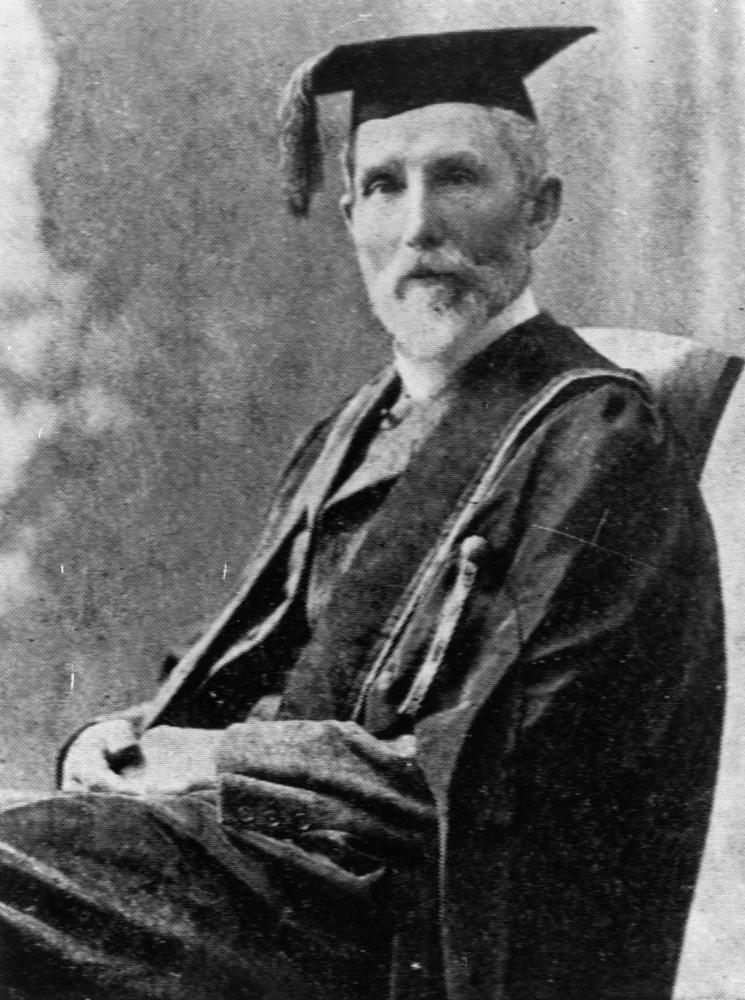
Andrew Joseph Thynne, chairman

The initial members of the committee included:

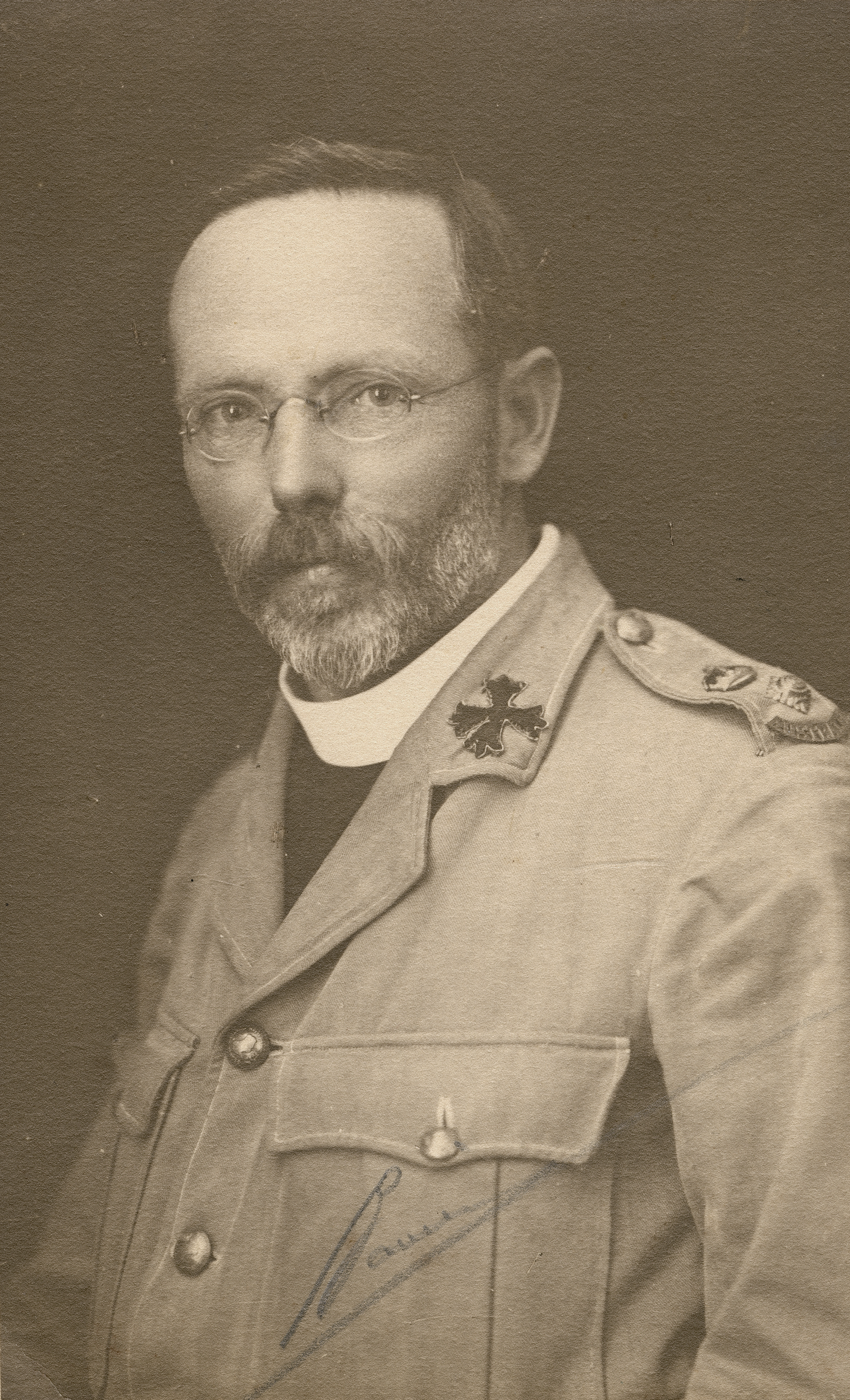
- Canon David John Garland in uniform
  Andrew Joseph Thynne (chairman), a Member of the Queensland Legislative Council and a Lieutenant-Colonel in the Queensland Volunteer Defence Force
- Colonel Robert Albert Moore
- Colonel Albert Edward Halstead
- Colonel John Francis Flewell-Smith, commander of the 5th Queensland Imperial Bushmen in the Boer War
- Colonel Henry Venn King
- Arthur Whittingham, a Member of the Queensland Legislative Council
- Alexander James Gibson, Professor of Engineering at the University of Queensland
- George Down, Mayor of Brisbane
- Peter Balderston Macgregor, Member of the Queensland Legislative Assembly
- Robert Christian (Bob) Ramsay
- Thomas Brown

Later members included:

- Canon David John Garland, an Anglican clergyman and an Australian Army chaplain, who joined the committee in June 1915 as honorary secretary
- John Adamson (Minister for Railways)
- Herbert Hardacre (Minister for Lands)
- G. H. Seabrook
- Harry Diddams, alderman and former Mayor of Brisbane
- Sir Robert Philp, former Premier of Queensland
- Sir Alfred Cowley, former Member of the Queensland Legislative Assembly
- G. Gray
- W. P. Devereux
