= Francis Reed (cricketer) =

English cricketer

Francis Reed (24 October 1850 – 30 April 1912) was an English cricket player. He played first-class cricket for Somerset from 1882 to 1884.

Reed was born at Ottery St Mary, Devon and died at Whitechapel, London.

A right-handed lower-order batsman and a right-arm medium-paced bowler, Reed played for the Gentlemen of Somerset team from 1871 and for Somerset in pre-first-class matches across the 1870s. In 1882, when some of Somerset's games were retrospectively accorded first-class status, he played half a dozen matches and in the first of them, against Hampshire at Southampton, he took four first-innings wickets for 35 runs in 28 four-ball overs, and these remained his best bowling figures. He did not play at all in 1883 but returned for a few games in 1884 and in the Hampshire fixture at Southampton he again did well, scoring an unbeaten 57 in the first innings, though Somerset lost the match heavily after conceding 645 in Hampshire's only innings.
