= Edward Western =

English cricketer

Edward Western (12 May 1845 – 16 October 1919) was an English cricketer who played first-class cricket for Somerset in 1882 and 1884 and for Marylebone Cricket Club in 1882. He was born at Paulton, Somerset and died at Minehead, also in Somerset.

Western was a right-handed middle order batsman and an occasional wicketkeeper who played for the amateur teams that predated the entry of Somerset into first-class cricket in 1882, as well as for the embryonic Somerset county side. He acted as the secretary for the meeting that followed the match between the "Gentlemen of Somerset" and the "Gentlemen of Devon" at Sidmouth in 1875 that led to the formation of Somerset County Cricket Club and he remained as honorary secretary until first-class status had been achieved.

His own cricket career was limited to three matches, in one of which he appeared for MCC against Somerset: this was his most successful game, and he made 13 in MCC's only innings, his highest first-class score.
