= Charles Burke (cricketer) =

English cricketer and merchant

Personal information
- Full name: Charles Carrington Burke
- Born: 8 July 1853; Bayswater, Middlesex, England
- Died: 22 May 1904 (aged 50); Shackleford, Surrey, England
- Batting: Unknown

Domestic team information
- Years: Team
- 1882: Marylebone Cricket Club

Career statistics
Competition	First-class
Matches	1
Runs scored	7
Batting average	3.50
100s/50s	–/–
Top score	7
Catches/stumpings	–/–
- Source: Cricinfo, 19 September 2021

Charles Carrington Burke (8 July 1853 — 22 May 1904) was an English first-class cricketer.

The son of James St George Burke, he was born in July 1853 at Bayswater. He was educated at Harrow School, before going up to Trinity College, Cambridge. He was a student of the Inner Temple, but withdrew in 1881 before being called to the bar. Burke played a single first-class cricket match for the Marylebone Cricket Club (MCC) against Somerset at Lord's in 1882. Batting twice in the match, he was dismissed without scoring by Herbert Fowler in the MCC first innings, while in their second innings he was dismissed for 7 runs by Arnold Fothergill. He married Frances Philippa Addison, daughter of Charles G. Addison, in December 1882. Burke died in May 1904 at Mitchen Hall near Shackleford, Surrey.
