= Lyonel Hildyard =

English cricketer

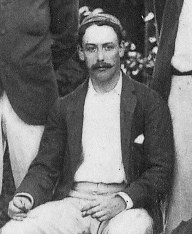

Personal information
- Full name: Lyonel D'Arcy Hildyard
- Born: 5 February 1861; Bury, Greater Manchester, England
- Died: 22 April 1931 (aged 70); Rowley, East Yorkshire, England
- Batting: Right-handed
- Role: Batsman

Domestic team information
- Years: Team
- 1882–83: Somerset
- 1884–85: Lancashire
- 1884–87: Oxford University
- First-class debut: 4 August 1882 Somerset v Marylebone Cricket Club (MCC)
- Last First-class: 11 June 1887 Oxford University v Surrey

Career statistics
Competition	First-class
Matches	32
Runs scored	811
Batting average	17.25
100s/50s	–/4
Top score	62*
Balls bowled	32
Wickets	–
Bowling average	–
5 wickets in innings	–
10 wickets in match	–
Best bowling	0/10
Catches/stumpings	26/–
- Source: CricketArchive, 4 April 2011

Lyonel D'Arcy Hildyard (5 February 1861 – 22 April 1931) played first-class cricket for Somerset from 1882 to 1883, for Lancashire in 1884 and 1885, and for Oxford University from 1884 to 1887. He was born at Bury, then in Lancashire, and died at Rowley, near Hull, Yorkshire.

Educated at Birmingham Grammar School (now King Edward's School, Birmingham), Hildyard was a right-handed middle- or lower-order batsman and first appeared for Somerset in a non-first-class match in 1880 when he both bowled and apparently kept wicket (he made a stumping). Some of Somerset's matches have been rated as first-class from the 1882 season (until 1885) and Hildyard appeared in games in both 1882 and 1883. In his single match in 1882 against Marylebone Cricket Club (MCC), he came in at No 11 in the second innings and proceeded to score an unbeaten 59, which was his highest score for Somerset. He played in six first-class matches for Somerset in 1883, and in the autumn started at Magdalen College, Oxford, where he studied to be a clergyman.

Hildyard's first first-class match in 1884 was for Lancashire against the Oxford University side, and he opened the innings and made 17 and 14. The university team was very strong in 1884 – "the most successful that ever represented the University before or since," wrote Wisden Cricketers' Almanack in its 1932 obituary of Hildyard. It went on: "Hildyard was fortunate to get his Blue, for he only came into the side at the last minute, mainly owing to the failure of A. R. Cobb who, coming up with a great reputation from Winchester, could make no runs at Oxford." In fact, Hildyard played only in the MCC match immediately preceding the University Match and scored only 11 and 1 not out in that game. In the university match itself, he made just 2. Later in the 1884 season Hildyard appeared in three further matches for Lancashire.

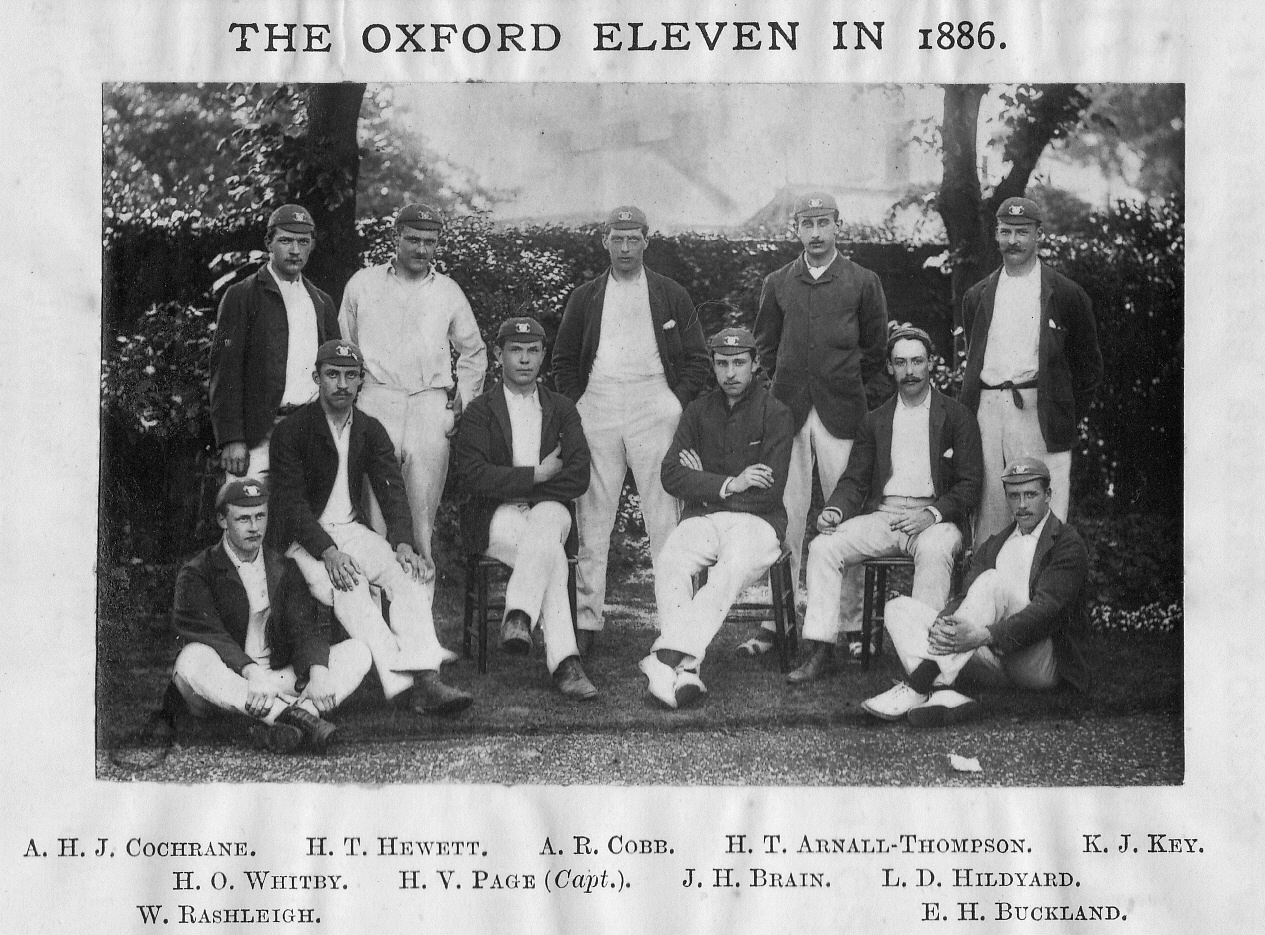
Hildyard (seated on chair, first from the right) with the Oxford University cricket team in 1886

Hildyard was a more regular player in a weaker Oxford side in 1885 and was awarded a second Blue. In the match against MCC he increased his personal best score to 62. Then against Surrey at Oxford he scored an unbeaten 50 after Oxford had been made to follow on, and he followed that in the return match against Surrey at The Oval with 62 not out, which with the earlier score against MCC was the highest score of his entire first-class career. In the 1885 University Match, he made 13 and 18. As in 1884, he played without much success for Lancashire after the university term was over.

While Hildyard won a third Blue in 1886, he was not successful in any of his matches for Oxford that season, and his first-class cricket career ended after a few matches in the 1887 season. He did not play for Lancashire after 1885.

As a clergyman in the Church of England, he was a minor canon at Windsor and in 1908 he became the rector of Rowley in the East Riding of Yorkshire, a living that had been in the Hildyard family for several generations.
