= George Nash (cricketer) =

English cricketer (1850–1903)

Personal information
- Full name: George Nash
- Born: 1 April 1850; Aylesbury, Buckinghamshire, England
- Died: 13 November 1903 (aged 53); Aylesbury, Buckinghamshire, England
- Batting: Right-handed
- Bowling: Slow left-arm orthodox

Domestic team information
- Years: Team
- 1879–1885: Lancashire
- First-class debut: 26 May 1879 Lancashire v Nottinghamshire
- Last First-class: 28 May 1885 Lancashire v Kent

Career statistics
Competition	First-class
Matches	58
Runs scored	347
Batting average	5.78
100s/50s	0/0
Top score	30
Balls bowled	7,793
Wickets	232
Bowling average	12.36
5 wickets in innings	17
10 wickets in match	5
Best bowling	8/14
Catches/stumpings	37/–
- Source: ESPNcricinfo, 28 May 2011

George Nash (1 April 1850 – 13 November 1903) was an English professional cricketer during the 1880s. Nash played as a slow left-arm orthodox bowler for Lancashire, and later in Minor Counties cricket for his native Buckinghamshire.

== Life and career ==
Nash began playing cricket at club level for Oving. At the club he started as an underarm bowler, but as was common at the time, he developed to the newer overarm style of bowling. He played cricket as a professional, moving around clubs, and playing for a time for Lancashire in first-class cricket. During his first-class career, he claimed 232 wickets at an average of 12.36. He took eight wickets in an innings on three occasions; against Surrey and the United South of England Eleven in 1880, and against Somerset in 1882, when his 8 for 14 included four wickets in four balls.

Along with many other spin bowlers of his time, Nash's bowling action was questioned, and he eventually left first-class cricket as a result: his final match for Lancashire was in 1885, though he played rarely after 1883. He returned to club cricket, and played for Darlington for ten years, and was awarded a benefit match upon his departure. He played out his career at Buckinghamshire, playing Minor Counties cricket, until his death in 1903. He was twice selected to play in representative sides: in 1880 for the North against the United South of England Eleven, and in 1883 for "The Rest" against Nottinghamshire and Yorkshire.

Very much a bowler, Nash's highest score batting in first-class cricket was 30. Bill Roe said that in a game against Cambridge University, Nash was dropped off every ball of an over bowled by Robert Ramsay, before Roe himself caught the professional off the first ball of the following over.
