= Robert Ramsay (cricketer) =

English Amateur cricketer (1861–1957)

Personal information
- Full name: Robert Christian Ramsay
- Born: 20 December 1861; Cheltenham, Gloucestershire, England
- Died: 25 June 1957 (aged 95); Bekesbourne, Kent, England
- Batting: Right-handed
- Bowling: Right-arm leg break
- Relatives: Francis Ramsay (brother)

Domestic team information
- Years: Team
- 1881–2: Cambridge University
- 1881–2: Somerset
- First-class debut: 19 May 1881 Cambridge University v Yorkshire
- Last First-class: 21 August 1882 Somerset v Australians

Career statistics
Competition	First-class
Matches	15
Runs scored	303
Batting average	13.77
100s/50s	0/2
Top score	71
Balls bowled	2,964
Wickets	69
Bowling average	17.82
5 wickets in innings	5
10 wickets in match	2
Best bowling	7/22
Catches/stumpings	11/–
- Source: CricketArchive, 27 May 2011

Robert Christian Ramsay (20 December 1861 – 25 June 1957) was an English-born pastoralist and businessman who worked in Queensland, Australia. During the late 1880s, he was also an amateur cricketer who played for Harrow, Cambridge University and Somerset. In 1882, he also played for the Gentlemen of England under W.G. Grace.

Born in Cheltenham, Gloucestershire, Ramsay spent his early childhood in Australia, but moved back to England with his family in March 1874 to enable him and his older brother to receive an education. He attended Harrow and then Cambridge, and gained his sporting Blue at the latter, playing in the University match against Oxford in 1882. He made fifteen first-class appearances for Cambridge and Somerset in 1881 and 1882, but did not play any first-class cricket after that. In 1883, he left Cambridge without graduating and returned to Australia where, after working as a jackaroo at Winbar Station in New South Wales for nearly two years, he joined his brother Frank at Eton Vale, a large pastoral station on Queensland's Darling Downs owned by their father Robert Burnett Ramsay and Arthur Hodgson. At the time, Eton Vale was being managed by Arthur Hodgson's son Edward.

Bob Ramsay remained in Australia until his retirement in June 1920, when he returned with his wife and children to England and settled in Bekesbourne, Kent.

== Life and career ==
=== Early life and cricket ===
Robert Christian Ramsay was born in Cheltenham, Gloucestershire on 20 December 1861 as the sixth child and fourth son of Robert Burnett Ramsay and Susan, née Lindsay Carnegie. Three of his elder siblings died in very early childhood and his older brother Alfred died from appendicitis in 1874 when only 15 years old. Apart from spending five years as a director of mercantile firm Ramsay, Young & Co. in Sydney between 1839 and 1844, Robert Ramsay's father was a pastoralist and politician in Queensland who served as the eighth treasurer of Queensland. Bob Ramsay was at school in Warwick and then briefly at Ipswich Grammar School in Queensland, Australia until the family moved to England in March 1874. He then attended Elstree School and Harrow School. At Harrow, he was part of the football team in 1878 and 1879, captaining the side in the latter year. He also played for the school's cricket team, alongside his older brother Marmaduke Francis Ramsay, better known as Frank. In 1879, the brothers combined to take seventeen of Eton College's twenty wickets, of which Robert claimed six in the first innings and four in the second.

Ramsay followed his older brother to Trinity Hall, Cambridge, and in his first year played in the freshmen's trial match in which he claimed six wickets, five of them in the first innings. He played one first-class match for the university that summer, bowling ten overs without taking a wicket against Yorkshire. He also played five second-class matches during 1881, all for Somerset County Cricket Club. His best performance for Somerset during that time was against Kent, when he claimed six wickets in the first innings.

The following year at Cambridge, Ramsay played nine first-class matches for the university, and gained his blue. His first match in the summer of 1882 was played for the university against the Marylebone Cricket Club (MCC), a match which Cambridge won by 189 runs, aided by the strong bowling of Ramsay, who claimed 13 wickets and conceded 49 runs, the tenth best bowling performance for the university. Later in the summer he claimed eight wickets against Lancashire, and then picked up 12 wickets against the touring Australians. In the match against the Australians, he collected five wickets in the first innings and seven in the second, albeit more expensively than in the match against the MCC. He was less prolific against Lancashire for Somerset, during a match played in such cold weather that catches were hard to hold. Bill Roe said that during this match, Lancashire's number eleven, George Nash was dropped off every ball of an over bowled by Ramsay, before Roe himself caught Nash off the first ball of the following over. Ramsay was selected to play for the "Gentlemen of England" against the touring Australians, and claimed three wickets in a match which the Australians won by an innings. In the University match against Oxford, Ramsay had little success, taking two wickets from his 52 overs, during which he conceded 91 runs. Cambridge won the match by seven wickets.

In all, Ramsay played 15 first-class cricket matches, and took 69 wickets at an average of 17.82. He claimed five wickets in an innings five times, and ten wickets in a match twice. He bowled with an unusual action which gained him the nickname "Twisting Tommy", because of its resemblance to a corkscrew. As a batsman, he totalled 303 runs at an average of 13.77, including two half-centuries, with a career best of 71.

=== Return to Australia ===
Ramsay did not graduate from Cambridge, but instead returned to Australia in 1883 to go into farming, first as a jackaroo on Winbar Station in New South Wales and then, in late 1885, with his older brother Frank at Eton Vale, a large station on the Darling Downs owned by their father and Arthur Hodgson, later Sir Arthur Hodgson, that was then being managed by Arthur Hodgson's son Edward.

In December 1886, he and Frank, together with Edward Hodgson, established Ramsay Bros. & Hodgson independently of their fathers and bought Oondooroo, a huge station that, in Bob's own words in a letter to his father, was "about 140 miles from Hughenden Railway and 18 miles from Winton, [and] consists of 1035 square miles of country as good as it is possible to get". The two Ramsay brothers became five when three younger Ramsay brothers, Lauderdale, Douglas and Norman joined the firm two years later. Ramsay Brothers & Hodgson went on to acquire numerous other Queensland stations and, after the premature death of Edward Hodgson in 1896, became one of the largest sheep-farming enterprises in the world. In response to claims by an American journalist about an American sheep-farmer, The Western Champion and General Advertiser dated 9 October 1905 echoed the North Queensland Register in saying that the Ramsay Bros. would, "with a good season or two, give the American a shaking" for the title of biggest sheep-farmers in the world. At Oondooroo, Ramsay established what the Australian Dictionary of Biography described as "the most progressive run [station] in north-west Queensland." He used modern technology to achieve this, including "private telephone-lines, shearing machines, Humber motorcycles and Serpollet steam-motorcars." In 1907, Ramsay married 20-year-old Olive Zillah Voss at St James' Cathedral in Townsville, Queensland, with whom he had seven children between 1908 and 1924.

He took over management of the family estates upon his brother Frank's retirement to England in November 1908, and two years later became a founding member of the Brisbane branch of the Round Table. Between 1914 and 1917, he was a member of the Queensland Recruiting Committee but left in protest over the failure of the 1916 Federal Government referendum to introduce conscription. Instead, he joined the Queensland Reinforcements Referendum Committee, of which he became president. He remained active as a pastoralist and businessman until his retirement in 1920, at which time he moved to England. In 1921, he moved to Howletts, his parents' former home in Bekesbourne, Kent, and remained there until he died on 25 June 1957.
