= Frederick Potbury =

English cricketer

Frederick John Potbury (7 November 1862 – 4 April 1943) was an English cricketer who played first-class cricket for Somerset in 1882. He was born at Ottery St Mary, Devon and died at Sidmouth, also in Devon.

Potbury's single first-class match for Somerset was the county side's first-ever first-class game, the match against Lancashire at Old Trafford; Somerset's two completed innings only totalled 80 runs in all and Potbury contributed nothing to either of them, one of four players to record a "pair" in the match. He did not appear in first-class cricket again.

In 1901, Potbury was the winner of the "All-Comers' Challenge Cup" at the National Rifle Association summer meeting at Bisley, Surrey. He is credited as "Lieutenant F. J. Potbury, 3rd V. B. Devon". He retired from the Volunteer Force in 1908 with the rank of captain but returned to service in the First World War as a firearms instructor at what was still termed the School of Musketry, retiring in 1917.
