= Trumble =

Trumble is a surname of English, Scottish and Irish origin. Notable people with this surname include:

- Angus Trumble (1964–2022), Australian scholar, art curator and author
- Billy Trumble (1863–1944), Australian cricketer
- David Trumble (born 1986), British film writer/director
- Francis Trumble (?–1791), American chair and cabinetmaker
- Hal Trumble, (1926–2010), American ice hockey administrator and referee
- Hugh Trumble (1867–1938), Australian cricketer
- Robert Trumble (1919–2011), Australian musician and author
- Thomas Trumble (1872–1954), Australian public servant
- Hugh Compson Trumble (1894–1962), Australian surgeon
