= Mordecai Sherwin =

English cricketer and footballer

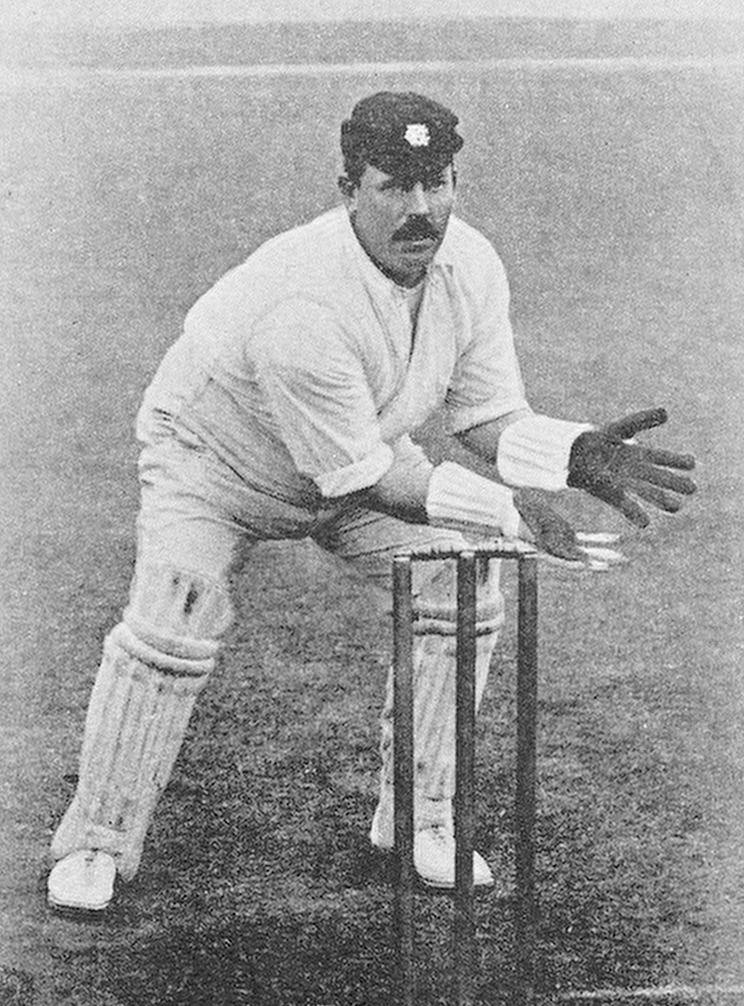
- Mordecai Sherwin

Personal information
- Born: 26 February 1851; Kimberley, Nottinghamshire, England
- Died: 3 July 1910 (aged 59); Nottingham, England
- Batting: Right-handed
- Bowling: Right-arm fast

International information
- National side: England
- Test debut (cap 53): 28 January 1887 v Australia
- Last Test: 17 July 1888 v Australia

Career statistics
Competition	Test	First-class
Matches	3	328
Runs scored	30	2,332
Batting average	15.00	7.59
100s/50s	0/0	0/0
Top score	21*	37
Balls bowled	–	270
Wickets	–	8
Bowling average	–	13.50
5 wickets in innings	–	0
10 wickets in match	–	0
Best bowling	–	2/7
Catches/stumpings	5/2	611/225
- Source: CricInfo, 5 August 2020

Mordecai Sherwin (26 February 1851 – 3 July 1910) was a professional footballer and cricketer who played in goal for Notts County and as a wicket-keeper for Nottinghamshire between 1878 and 1896.

As a footballer, Sherwin played in goal for County from 10 November 1883 until 10 November 1888 and was, according to the sportswriter "Tityrus" (the pseudonym of J.A.H. Catton, editor of the Athletic News), the idol of the crowd despite his unpromising physique:

"Although only 5ft. 9ins, and bordering on 17 stone, he was a kind of forerunner to the mighty Foulke... very nimble, as quick a custodian as he was a wicket-keeper. In one match, when the Blackburn Rovers were playing at the Trent Bridge ground, that sturdy and skilful outside right, Joseph Morris Lofthouse, thought he would have a tilt with Sherwin.

"He charged him, and rebounded. Sherwin said: "Young man, you'll hurt yourself if you do that again." Undeterred, Lofthouse returned to the attack, but Sherwin stepped aside with the alacrity of a dancer, and the Lancashire lad found out how hard was the goalpost and how sharp its edge.

"Sherwin was a wonder. It was the custom in those days for teams to entertain each other to dinner after a match... At one banquet Sherwin "obliged" with Oh, Dem Golden Slippers, and surprised the gathering with a jig and a somersault. At seventeen stones!"

Another source states that 'Mordy Sherwin' was an agile and reliable goalkeeper, if somewhat eccentric.

Mordecai Sherwin played just the one League match. The venue was Trent Bridge, Nottingham. The date was 10 November 1888 and the opposition was Accrington. For a November's day the weather was pleasant and the 8,000 crowd saw some fine attacking football. Accrington forward Billy Barbour put his side ahead but not long after Harry Daft leveled the scores and Sherwin entertained the crowd with one of his cartwheels. The match renewed the rivalry between Accrington forward Joe Lofthouse (see above for details) but Lofthouse got the better in this match by restoring Accrington' lead. 2–1 to Accrington at half-time.

The second-half saw Notts County get the better of the play, Charles Shelton equalizing for County and then Bob Jardine putting County ahead for the first time in the match. As the match wore on County had two defenders injured so it was no surprise when Billy Barbour got his brace and the match finished a draw, 3-3, a point each.

In 1888–1889 season Sherwin also played in three F.A. Cup ties with Notts County winning all three. The victory at Recreation Ground, Staveley, against Staveley on 8 December 1888 was Sherwin' last game for Notts County. County won 3–1.

As a cricketer, Sherwin captained Nottinghamshire in 1887 and 1888. He also played three Test matches for England on the tour to Australia in 1886/7. He was named as one of the Wisden Cricketers of the Year in 1891.

After he retired as a cricketer, he umpired until 1901, and even stood in one Test in 1899. By trade, Sherwin was a publican. Sherwin had a wife, Emma, and at least six children, Mary, William, Emma, Ellen, Mordecai and Frederick.

The name of Arthur Conan Doyle's most famous character, Sherlock Holmes, is said to have been inspired partially by Sherwin, and partially by Frank Shacklock.

Sporting positions
Preceded by Alfred Shaw	Nottinghamshire County cricket captain 1887-1888	Succeeded by John Dixon
