= John Trumbull (disambiguation) =

John Trumbull (1756–1843) was an American painter active during the American Revolutionary War.

John Trumbull may also refer to:

- John Trumbull (poet) (1750–1831), a cousin of the painter
- John H. Trumbull (1873–1961), American politician, 70th Governor of Connecticut

== See also ==
- Jonathan Trumbull (1710–1785), American politician, 16th Governor of Connecticut, father of both Jonathan Trumbull Jr. and John Trumbull
- John William Trumble (1863–1944), Australian cricketer
