= 1896 English cricket season =

Cricket season review

The 1896 English cricket season featured the seventh edition of the County Championship. Yorkshire won the championship title having lost only losing three of their 26 matches, setting a points percentage record with 68.42. Yorkshire's team did not possess the greatest performers statistically, such as Sussex with Ranjitsinhji, or Gloucestershire with W. G. Grace, but a well-rounded squad with four bowlers taking more than 70 wickets in the Championship and five batsmen scoring over 1000 runs gave them the title. Playing against Warwickshire at Edgbaston in May, Yorkshire scored 887 in their first innings, which is still the highest total in the history of the County Championship.

The highlight of the season, however, was the Australian tour, where Australia won their first Test match in England since 1888, and gave England a fight up until the third Test. On a rain-affected pitch, however, England hauled in a 66-run third test victory thanks to Bobby Peel, who took six for 23. The win sealed the Ashes in favour of England by 2 wins to 1.

== Honours ==
- County Championship - Yorkshire
- Minor Counties Championship - Worcestershire
- Wisden (Five Cricketers of the Season) - Syd Gregory, Dick Lilley, K S Ranjitsinhji, Tom Richardson, Hugh Trumble)

== County Championship ==
=== Final table ===
County Championship 1896 - Final Standings
	Team	P	W	L	D	Pts	GC^{1}	Pts/GC (as %)
1	Yorkshire	26	16	3	7	13	19	68.42
2	Lancashire	22	11	4	7	7	15	46.67
3	Middlesex	16	8	3	5	5	11	45.45
4	Surrey	26	17	7	2	10	24	41.67
5	Essex	12	5	4	3	1	9	11.11
6	Nottinghamshire	16	5	5	6	0	10	0.00
7	Derbyshire	16	4	6	6	-2	10	-20.00
8	Hampshire	16	5	8	3	-3	13	-23.08
9	Kent	18	5	9	4	-4	14	-28.57
10	Gloucestershire	18	5	10	3	-5	15	-33.33
11	Somerset	16	3	7	6	-4	10	-40.00
12	Warwickshire	18	3	8	7	-5	11	-45.45
13	Leicestershire	14	2	8	4	-6	10	-60.00
14	Sussex	18	2	9	7	-7	11	-63.64

- ^{1} Games completed

Points system:

- 1 for a win
- 0 for a draw, a tie or an abandoned match
- -1 for a loss
- Total points were then divided by the number of games completed, which determined the ranking

=== Most runs in the County Championship ===
1896 County Championship - leading batsmen
Name	Team	Matches	Runs	Average	100s	50s
Ranjitsinhji	Sussex	17	1698	58.55	7	6
WG Grace	Gloucestershire	18	1565	53.96	4	6
John Brown	Yorkshire	24	1556	45.76	4	7
Bobby Abel	Surrey	26	1516	42.11	4	6
Frank Sugg	Lancashire	22	1278	39.93	3	4

=== Most wickets in the County Championship ===
1896 County Championship - leading bowlers
Name	Team	Matches	Balls bowled	Wickets taken	Average
Tom Richardson	Surrey	25	6163	191	15.46
Arthur Mold	Lancashire	21	4836	130	17.20
Johnny Briggs	Lancashire	22	6884	122	19.77
J.T. Hearne	Middlesex	16	5294	118	17.95
Charlie Townsend	Gloucestershire	18	3685	101	21.84

== Ashes tour ==
England won again, but this time faced a series-decider in the final match at The Oval, without George Lohmann of Surrey and William Gunn of Nottinghamshire, who went on a strike over match fees allegedly received by the amateur WG Grace. In the first Test at Lord's, England won by six wickets, chasing 108 to win, but Australia recovered to win the second Test at Old Trafford, despite 154 from Ranjitsinhji on debut - as the first Indian to play Test cricket, and only the second to score a century on Test debut. The third Test was ravaged by rain, and in poor playing conditions England won by 66 runs. The highest individual score in that match was 47 from Australian Joe Darling.

Cumulative record - Test wins	1876–1896
England	25
Australia	15
Drawn	6

== Overall first-class statistics ==
=== Leading batsmen ===
1896 English cricket season - leading batsmen
Name	Team(s)	Matches	Runs	Average	100s	50s
Ranjitsinhji	England, Gentlemen, Marylebone Cricket Club (MCC), South of England, Sussex	29	2780	57.91	7	8
Bobby Abel	England, Players, South of England, Surrey	35	2218	42.65	5	11
WG Grace	England, Gentlemen, Gloucestershire, Marylebone Cricket Club (MCC), South of England	30	2135	42.70	4	11
John Brown	England, North of England, Players, Yorkshire	35	1873	35.33	4	8
Andrew Stoddart	England, Gentlemen, Marylebone Cricket Club (MCC), Middlesex, South of England	28	1671	34.81	4	7

=== Leading bowlers ===
1896 English cricket season - leading bowlers
Name	Team(s)	Matches	Balls bowled	Wickets taken	Average
J T Hearne	England, Marylebone Cricket Club (MCC), Middlesex, Players, South of England	35	10,016	257	14.28
Tom Richardson	England, Players, South of England, Surrey	34	8287	246	16.32
Johnny Briggs	England, Lancashire, North of England, Players	30	8701	165	19.71
Arthur Mold	Lancashire, North of England	27	5830	150	18.12
Hugh Trumble	Australia	30	5701	148	15.81

== Annual reviews ==
- James Lillywhite's Cricketers' Annual (Red Lilly), Lillywhite, 1897
- Wisden Cricketers' Almanack, 1897
