= Department of Defence (1921–1939) =

Australian government department, 1921–1939

Department overview
- Formed: 21 December 1921
- Preceding Department: Department of Defence (I)
- Dissolved: 13 November 1939
- Superseding Department: Department of Defence Co-ordination Department of Air Department of the Army Department of the Navy
- Jurisdiction: Commonwealth of Australia
- Headquarters: Victoria
- Department executives: Thomas Trumble, Secretary (1921–1927); Malcolm Shepherd, Secretary (1927–1937); Frederick Shedden, Secretary (1937–1939)

The Department of Defence was an Australian government department that existed between December 1921 and November 1939.

== History ==
The department was formed in December 1921 when then Navy Office was merged into the existing Department of Defence.

== Scope ==
Information about the department's functions and government funding allocation could be found in the Administrative Arrangements Orders, the annual budget statements and in the department's annual reports.

When it was established, the department was responsible for Naval, Army and Air Defence matters, and ran a number of factories for munitions, small arms, cordite and clothing etc.

== Structure ==
The department was a Commonwealth Public Service department, staffed by officials who were responsible to the Minister for Defence.

The Secretaries of the Department were Thomas Trumble (1921‑1927), Malcolm Shepherd (1927‑1937), and finally Frederick Shedden (1937‑1939).
