= History of Australian cricket from 1876–77 to 1890 =

This article describes the history of Australian cricket from the 1876–77 season until 1890.

== Events ==
An England cricket team toured Australia and New Zealand in the winter of 1876–77 and, in March 1877, took part with Australia in the first two matches to be designated as Tests.

== Domestic cricket ==
The 1876–77 Australian cricket season focused on the touring England team and featured no first-class matches between the colonies. New South Wales, Victoria and Tasmania were unable to arrange fixtures as in previous seasons. Club cricket matches were played in most of the colonies.

In 1877–78, South Australia in its inaugural first-class match defeated Tasmania by an innings and 13 runs at the Adelaide Oval, this being the initial first-class match at that famous venue. New South Wales defeated Victoria twice. At the Melbourne Cricket Ground, [New South Wales|NSW] won by an innings and 6 runs. Then, in the initial first-class match at the Sydney Cricket Ground, NSW won by 1 wicket.

The colonies continued to arrange matches against each other on an ad hoc basis through the 1880s. For details of the matches, see: Intercolonial cricket in Australia and List of Australian intercolonial cricket matches.

== Leading players by season ==
The lists below give the leading first-class runscorers and wicket-takers in each domestic season.

=== Batsmen ===
- 1876–77 – Charles Bannerman (HS 165*) and George Ulyett (HS 94) scored 243 runs each @ 48.60
- 1877–78 – Nat Thomson 101 @ 33.66 (HS 73)
- 1878–79 – George Ulyett 306 @ 34.00 (HS 71)
- 1879–80 – Alec Bannerman 103 @ 25.75 (HS 52)
- 1880–81 – Tom Horan 318 @ 35.33 (HS 113)
- 1881–82 – Billy Murdoch 679 @ 61.72 (HS 321)
- 1882–83 – Alec Bannerman 434 @ 54.25 (HS 101*)
- 1883–84 – Billy Murdoch 567 @ 113.40 (HS 279*)
- 1884–85 – Billy Barnes 520 @ 43.33 (HS 134)
- 1885–86 – John McIlwraith 315 @ 78.75 (HS 133)
- 1886–87 – Arthur Shrewsbury 721 @ 48.06 (HS 236)
- 1887–88 – Harry Moses 815 @ 62.69 (HS 297*)
- 1888–89 – Harry Trott 507 @ 39.00 (HS 172)
- 1889–90 – Jack Lyons 254 @ 63.50 (HS 134)

=== Bowlers ===
- 1876–77 – Alfred Shaw 17 wickets @ 11.76 (BB 5–19)
- 1877–78 – Edwin Evans 18 @ 10.72 (BB 6–57)
- 1878–79 – Tom Emmett 44 @ 11.63 (BB 8–47)
- 1879–80 – William Cooper 12 @ 10.75 (BB 7–37)
- 1880–81 – Edwin Evans 32 @ 11.25 (BB 5–34)
- 1881–82 – Eugene Palmer 47 @ 21.55 (BB 7–46)
- 1882–83 – Eugene Palmer 51 @ 11.52 (BB 7–65)
- 1883–84 – Eugene Palmer 29 @ 17.51 (BB 6–72)
- 1884–85 – Bobby Peel 35 @ 19.22 (BB 7–27)
- 1885–86 – Fred Spofforth 18 @ 15.22 (BB 5–43)
- 1886–87 – Charlie Turner 70 @ 7.68 (BB 8–32)
- 1887–88 – Charlie Turner 106 @ 13.59 (BB 8–39)
- 1888–89 – John Ferris 36 @ 15.83 (BB 6–62)
- 1889–90 – Hugh Trumble 29 @ 14.20 (BB 8–110)

== International cricket ==
For information about the first Australian tour of England, see : Australian cricket team in England and North America in 1878

== International tours of Australia ==
=== England 1876–77 ===
The historic two-match series was drawn 1–1:

- 1st Test at Melbourne Cricket Ground – Australia won by 45 runs
- 2nd Test at Melbourne Cricket Ground – England won by 4 wickets

In addition, England played a first-class match against New South Wales at the Albert Cricket Ground in Sydney. This game was drawn.

All the other games played, mostly against odds, were not first-class. This included the New Zealand leg of the tour. England played 23 matches in total of which they won 11, lost 4 and drew 8.

For further details of this and the next three tours by England, see History of Test cricket from 1877 to 1883.

==== England squad ====
James Lillywhite of Sussex was both the tour organiser and England team captain. His party included five Yorkshire players: Tom Emmett, George Ulyett, Tom Armitage, Allen Hill and Andrew Greenwood. The other players were Harry Jupp, James Southerton, Ted Pooley (all of Surrey); Henry Charlwood (Sussex); John Selby and Alfred Shaw (both of Nottinghamshire).

=== England 1878–79 ===
- 1st Test at Melbourne Cricket Ground – Australia won by 10 wickets

The England team was otherwise known as Lord Harris' XI, after its captain, the tour having been organised by the Melbourne Cricket Club. In all matches, the team played 15, won 6, drew 6 and lost 3. In five first-class matches including the Test match, the tourists won 2 and lost 3.

No first-class matches were played in New Zealand but four first-class matches in addition to the Test match were played in Australia. These were versus New South Wales (twice) and Victoria (twice). A riot occurred when the tourists played New South Wales, which is more fully described in the article on the Sydney Riot of 1879.

=== England 1881–82 ===
- 1st Test at Melbourne Cricket Ground – match drawn
- 2nd Test at Sydney Cricket Ground – Australia won by 5 wickets
- 3rd Test at Sydney Cricket Ground – Australia won by 6 wickets
- 4th Test at Melbourne Cricket Ground – match drawn

=== England 1882–83 ===
- 1st Test at Melbourne Cricket Ground – Australia won by 9 wickets
- 2nd Test at Melbourne Cricket Ground – England won by an innings and 27 runs
- 3rd Test at Sydney Cricket Ground – England won by 69 runs
- 4th Test at Sydney Cricket Ground – Australia won by 4 wickets

The England team, captained by Ivo Bligh, was on its famous quest "to recover those Ashes", a reference to the famous RIP notice that was published in the aftermath of England's defeat by Australia at The Oval during the previous English season. Originally, three Tests were arranged and England won two of these after losing the first.

For details of this tour, see : English cricket team in Australia in 1882-83

=== England 1884–85 ===
- 1st Test at Adelaide Oval – England won by 8 wickets
- 2nd Test at Melbourne Cricket Ground – England won by 10 wickets
- 3rd Test at Sydney Cricket Ground – Australia won by 6 runs
- 4th Test at Sydney Cricket Ground – Australia won by 8 wickets
- 5th Test at Melbourne Cricket Ground – England won by an innings and 98 runs

Further details of this and the next two tours can be found in the article History of Test cricket from 1884 to 1889.

=== England 1886–87 ===
- 1st Test at Sydney Cricket Ground – England won by 13 runs
- 2nd Test at Sydney Cricket Ground – England won by 71 runs

=== England 1887–88 ===
- 1st Test at Sydney Cricket Ground – England won by 126 runs

For details of this tour, see : English cricket team in Australia and New Zealand in 1887-88

== External sources ==
- CricketArchive — itinerary of Australian cricket
