= Department of Home Security =

Australian government department

Department overview
- Formed: 26 June 1941
- Preceding Department: Department of Defence Co-ordination
- Dissolved: 1 February 1946
- Superseding Department: Department of the Interior (II) – for civil defence functions Department of Works and Housing – for Commonwealth Salvage Commission
- Jurisdiction: Commonwealth of Australia
- Ministers responsible: Joe Abbott, Minister (1941); Bert Lazzarini, Minister (1941–1946)
- Department executives: Frederick Shedden, Secretary (1941); Alexander Welch, Secretary (1942–1944); M.S. Thomson, Secretary (1944–1945)

The Department of Home Security was an Australian government department that existed between June 1941 and February 1946.

== History ==
When this department was first established in June 1941, it was nearly two years after Australia entered World War II. Frederick Shedden carried out the duties of the head of the department when it was first established, and at the same time he was retaining his position as Secretary of the Department of Defence Co-ordination. Alexander Welch was appointed permanent head of the department in December 1941.

The department was transferred to Canberra in 1941, a step in the development of Canberra as Australia's seat of government.

In March 1944, the department's Secretary Alexander Welch was appointed Director of War Housing and M.J.S. Thomson was appointed acting secretary of the department.

The department was abolished on 1 February 1946.

== Scope ==
Information about the department's functions and government funding allocation could be found in the Administrative Arrangements Orders, the Government's Gazette, annual budget statements and in the Department's annual reports.

According to the National Archives of Australia reproduction of the Commonwealth Gazette from June 1941, at its creation, the Department dealt with:

- acting in an advisory and coordinating capacity in relation to the government of the states in the measures for the protection of the lives and property of the civilian population in the event of an emergency arising out of the war;
- compensation for civil defence workers and the dependants of personnel who suffered injuries while on duty or whilst training; and for injuries sustained while carrying out essential duties during periods of enemy action;
- protection of bulk oil installations by screen walling, bunding, precautionary fire measures;
- Camouflage. Preparation of schemes and supervision of their implementation to meet the requirements of the services. Preparation of technical bulletins and posters illustrating the need for camouflage measures to protect vital installations and to protect vital equipment;
- prohibition of work near aerodromes under National Security (Supplementary) Regulation No 58;
- Securing appropriate measure of uniformity in essential codes in regard to lighting of vehicles, air raid warnings, shelter facilities;
- Air raid precaution measures in respect of Commonwealth establishments;
- financial arrangements between Commonwealth and states in connection with civil defence matters;
- securing fire fighting equipment, steel helmets, respirators and other essential equipment for the Commonwealth and for distribution to the states;
- civil defence matters including -
  - establishment of schools for air raid precautions training
  - furnishing technical advice to the state and Commonwealth departments
  - conducting research and experiments
  - preparation, printing and distribution of standard textbooks
  - distribution of films.

== Structure ==
The Department was a Commonwealth Public Service department responsible to the Minister for Home Security, initially Joe Abbott and later Bert Lazzarini. Department officials were headed by a Secretary.
