= Thomas Trumble =

Australian public servant

Thomas Trumble CMG, CBE

Secretary of the Department of Defence
- In office February 1918 – July 1927
- Prime Minister: Billy Hughes (1918–23); Stanley Bruce (1923–27)
- Minister: George Pearce (1918–21); Walter Massy-Greene (1921–23); Eric Bowden (1923–25); Sir Neville Howse (1925–27); Sir William Glasgow (1927)
- Preceded by: Sir Samuel Pethebridge
- Succeeded by: Malcolm Shepherd

Personal details
- Born: 9 April 1872 Ararat, Victoria
- Died: 2 July 1954 (aged 82) Caulfield, Victoria
- Education: Wesley College, Melbourne
- Occupation: Public servant
- Awards: Companion of the Order of St Michael and St George; Commander of the Order of the British Empire

Thomas Trumble, CMG, CBE (9 April 1872 – 2 July 1954) was a career Australian public servant who was appointed acting Secretary of the Department of Defence during the First World War, and Secretary from 1918 to 1927.

Trumble was the first Secretary who did not have a military background. After his Secretary role, he subsequently served as official secretary to the high commission for Australia in London, and Australian Defence Liaison Officer in London, retiring in 1932. During the Second World War, he was welcomed when he returned to public service from 1940 to 1943 as director of voluntary services, Department of Defence Co-ordination.

His older brothers Billy and Hugh played Test cricket for Australia.

Government offices
Preceded by Sir Samuel Pethebridge	Secretary of the Department of Defence (I); 1918–1921	Succeeded by Himself as Secretary of the Department of Defence (II)
Preceded by Himself as Secretary of the Department of Defence (I)	Secretary of the Department of Defence (II); 1921–1927	Succeeded by Malcolm Shepherd
