= Department of Defence (1901–1921) =

Australian government department, 1901–1921

Department overview
- Formed: 1 January 1901
- Dissolved: 21 December 1921
- Superseding Department: Department of Defence
- Jurisdiction: Commonwealth of Australia
- Headquarters: Victoria
- Department executives: Muirhead Collins, Secretary (1901–1910); Samuel Pethebridge, Secretary (1910–1918); Thomas Trumble, Secretary (1918–1921)

The Department of Defence was an Australian government department that was established at Federation and existed until 1921 when it was replaced with the subsequent Department of Defence.

== Scope ==
Information about the department's functions and government funding allocation could be found in the Administrative Arrangements Orders (AAOs).

In early AAOs, the department was responsible for Naval and Military defence and control of railway transport for defence.

== Structure ==
The department was a Commonwealth Public Service department, staffed by officials who were responsible to the Minister for Defence.

The Secretaries of the Department were Muirhead Collins (1901–1910), Samuel Pethebridge (1910–1918) and Thomas Trumble (1918‑1921). Pethebridge was actually Acting in the Secretary role since 1906, he died in 1918 while in office as permanent departmental Secretary.
