= Malcolm Shepherd (public servant) =

Australian public servant (1873–1960)

Malcolm Shepherd CMG, ISO

Secretary of the Prime Minister's Department
- In office 1 January 1912 – 27 January 1921
- Succeeded by: Percy Deane

Secretary of the Department of Defence
- In office 1927–1937
- Preceded by: Thomas Trumble
- Succeeded by: Sir Frederick Shedden

Personal details
- Born: 27 October 1873 Cambewarra, New South Wales
- Died: 25 June 1960 (aged 86) East Melbourne, Victoria
- Spouse(s): Edith Nina Adelaide Dimelow (m. 1899; d. 1915); Linda Hazel Hopetoun Gill (m. 1917)
- Occupation: Public servant

Malcolm Lindsay Shepherd CMG, ISO (27 October 1873 – 25 June 1960) was a senior Australian public servant. From 1904 to 1911, he served as the private secretary to four Australian prime ministers, (Alfred Deakin, Chris Watson, George Reid and Andrew Fisher), prior to being appointed as the inaugural Secretary of the Prime Minister's Department (1911–1921). He subsequently served as official secretary of the Commonwealth of Australia in London (1921–1927) and Secretary of the Department of Defence (1927–1937).

Government offices
New title Department established	Secretary of the Prime Minister's Department; 1911–1921	Succeeded by Percy Deane
Preceded by Thomas Trumble	Secretary of the Department of Defence (II); 1927–1937	Succeeded by Sir Frederick Shedden
