= Muirhead Collins =

Royal Navy officer and Australian public servant

Captain Sir Robert Henry Muirhead Collins, CMG (1852–1927) was an English-born Royal Navy officer, Colonial (Permanent Victorian Naval Forces) naval officer, Colonial public servant, Australian Federationist, Australian public service department head and Australia's official representative in London.

== Life summary ==
1852		Born 20 September 1852, Chew Magna, Somerset, England
1866	1877	Joins Royal Navy
1876		Appointed Lieutenant
1877		Appointed Lieutenant Commander; retired from Royal Navy
1877		Appointed lieutenant in the Permanent Victorian Naval Forces (PVNF), Victoria (Australia)
1884		Appointed Commander, PVNF
1886		Retired from Victorian navy with rank of Captain
1886		Married Elizabeth, daughter of Mr. Samuel Brush, pastoralist, of Boondara, New South Wales
1886	1901	Secretary for Defence in Victoria
1901	1906	Inaugural Secretary of the Australian Department of Defence
1904		Appointed CMG
1906	1910	Official Secretary to the Commonwealth of Australia in London
1913		Delegate for the Commonwealth Government at the International Conference on Lifesaving at Sea in London
1917		Retired
1919		Knighted
1927		Died 19 April 1927, Bath, Somerset, England

Collins was born to Dr Charles Howell Collins, a surgeon, and his Henrietta Jane Heaven (née Groset). Collins died in 1927 and was survived by his wife and their son, Major Howel Collins (graduated from Royal Military Academy in Woolwich) of the Australian Army.

Government offices
New title	Secretary of the Department of Defence; 1901–1910	Succeeded by Sir Samuel Pethebridge
