= Tich McFarlane =

Australian air force officer and public servant

Group Captain Tich McFarlane CBE DFC
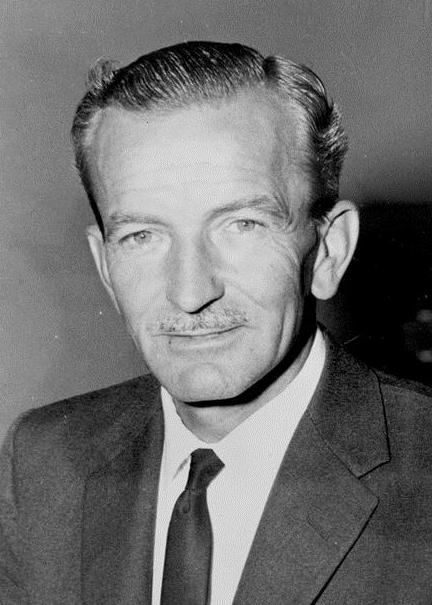

Secretary of the Department of Air
- In office 1956–1968
- Preceded by: Ted Hicks
- Succeeded by: Fred Green

Personal details
- Born: Archibald Bertram McFarlane; 4 June 1916 Yarraville, Victoria, Australia
- Died: 19 August 2001 (aged 85) Canberra, ACT, Australia
- Spouse: Beryl Dunning (m. 1943; died 1989)
- Children: 2
- Education: University of Melbourne
- Occupation: Public servant

Military service
- Allegiance: Australia
- Branch/service: Royal Australian Air Force
- Years of service: 1937–1948
- Rank: Group Captain
- Commands: No. 2 Squadron
- Battles/wars: World War II; Pacific War; Dutch East Indies campaign

Group Captain Archibald Bertram "Tich" McFarlane CBE DFC (4 June 1916 – 19 August 2001) was an Australian public servant and Royal Australian Air Force (RAAF) officer. He commanded No. 2 Squadron RAAF during part of World War II. He later served as secretary of the Department of Air from 1956 to 1968 and held other senior positions in the Commonwealth Public Service and statutory bodies.

== Early life ==
McFarlane was born on 4 June 1916 in Yarraville, Victoria, where his father was a cinema proprietor. He later recalled that he was "coloured by having been born and bred in a workingman's suburb like Yarraville". He began his education at a local state school, later attending Scotch College and studying law at the University of Melbourne.

== Military service ==
McFarlane was a member of the Melbourne University Rifles and joined the Citizen Air Force in May 1937 as an air cadet. He was commissioned as a pilot officer in December 1937 and was called up to the Royal Australian Air Force (RAAF) in September 1939 following the outbreak of World War II. During the Japanese invasion of the Dutch East Indies, McFarlane was commanding officer of the RAAF base at Namlea on the island of Buru. He organised a successful evacuation of his men in three overloaded Lockheed Hudson bombers. He and eight others remained behind to demolish the airfield, before completing an overland trek of 250 kilometres (160 mi) to a rendezvous on the other side of the island, where they were collected and evacuated to Darwin. During this time he was reported as "missing as a result of enemy action" by The Argus.

In April 1942 McFarlane took over the command of No. 2 Squadron, which was "quickly reorganised to a high standard of fighting efficiency and taken into action with conspicuous success". He was awarded the Distinguished Flying Cross for his role in bombing raids against enemy positions in Timor, and the squadron was also awarded an American honour, the Presidential Unit Citation. McFarlane later served as a liaison officer at the RAAF headquarters in London and as assistant commandant of the RAAF College in Point Cook, Victoria. He was not demobilised from the RAAF until 1948, with the rank of group captain.

== Public service career ==
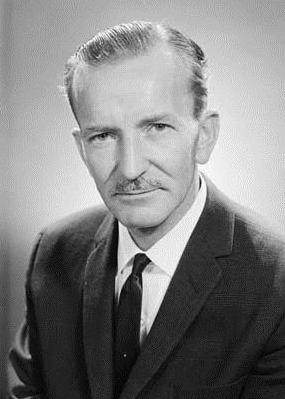
McFarlane in 1966

McFarlane joined the Department of Civil Aviation in 1948, where he became director of air transport and external relations. In this role he negotiated international travel arrangements for Qantas. He later became assistant director-general before transferring to the Department of Air in 1956 as departmental secretary. In 1963 he was appointed Commander of the Order of British Empire (CBE) for his work in negotiating the purchase of F-111 bombers from the United States.

In 1967, McFarlane was caught up in the VIP aircraft affair, a controversy over the Holt government's handling of RAAF VIP aircraft. He narrowly escaped being called before the Senate, which would have revealed that Prime Minister Harold Holt and Air Minister Peter Howson had misled parliament. Instead, the government's Senate leader John Gorton intervened by tabling the relevant information, thus sparing McFarlane from damaging his own minister's reputation. McFarlane "came through the VIP affair with his reputation enhanced".

McFarlane left the Department of Air in 1968 and was appointed by Gorton, the new prime minister, to a vacancy on the Public Service Board overseeing the Commonwealth Public Service. The Canberra Times reported that the appointment was a "surprise" and that Gorton had rejected a list of three candidates put forward by his advisers. According to Lenox Hewitt, McFarlane made "a very substantial contribution and brought a new set of ideals and standards into the working of the Public Service Board, particularly in its relations with government departments". In 1973 the Whitlam government appointed him to the newly created National Petroleum and Minerals Authority. He served on the executive for two years before retiring due to ill health, helping establish the authority's independence from the Public Service Board.

== Personal life ==
McFarlane married Beryl Dunning in 1943, with whom he had two daughters. He was widowed in 1989 and died of motor neurone disease in Canberra on 19 August 2001. At time of passing, McFarlane had five grandchildren.
