= John Dixon (English sportsman) =

English sportsman (1861–1931)

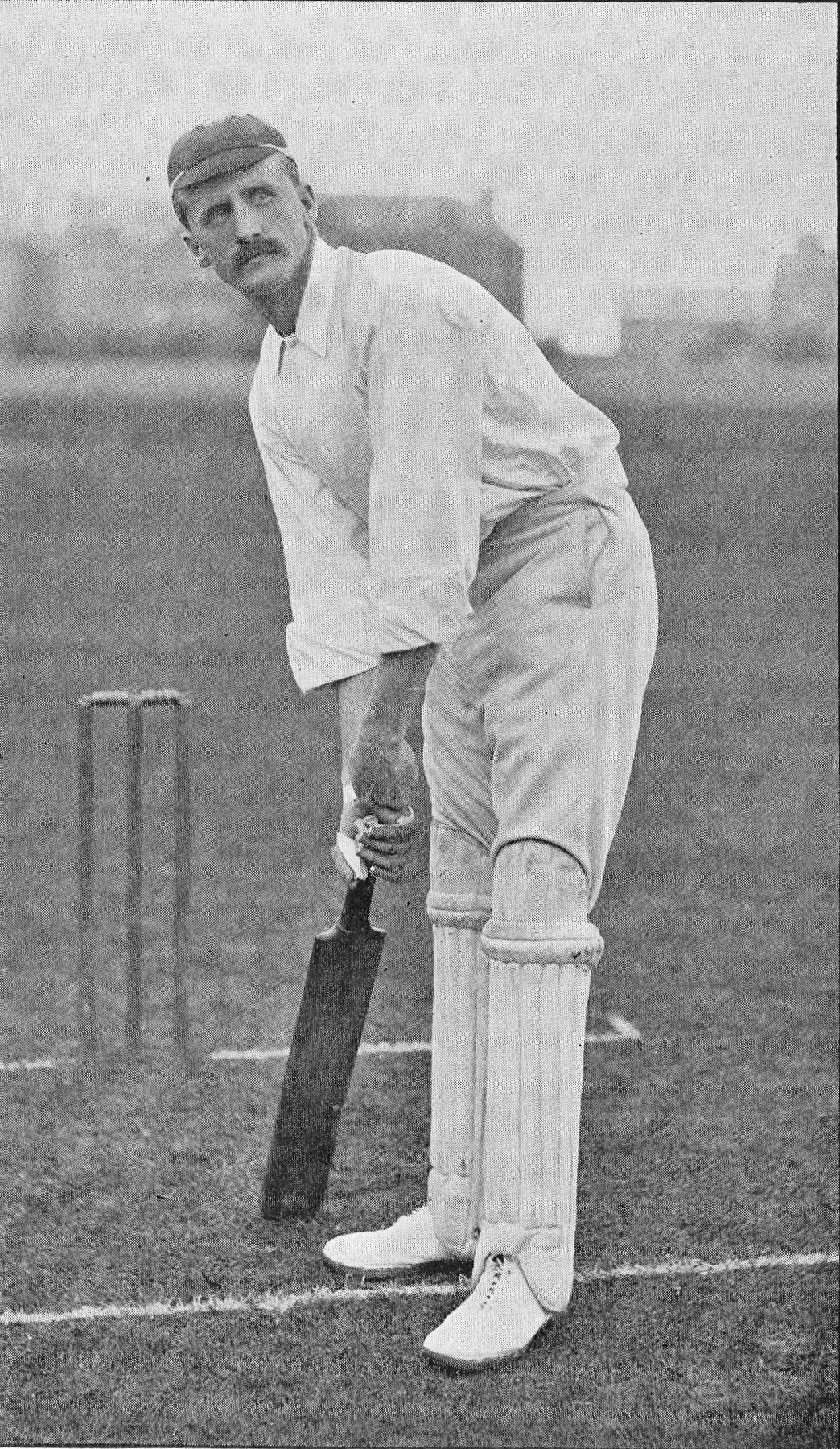

Personal information
- Full name: John Auger Dixon
- Born: 27 May 1861; Grantham, Lincolnshire, England
- Died: 8 June 1931 (aged 70); The Park, Nottingham, England
- Batting: Right-handed
- Bowling: Right-arm medium
- Role: Batsman

Domestic team information
- Years: Team
- 1882–1905: Nottinghamshire

Career statistics
Competition	First-class
Matches	253
Runs scored	9,527
Batting average	24.18
100s/50s	13/38
Top score	268*
Balls bowled	10,282
Wickets	184
Bowling average	27.60
5 wickets in innings	2
10 wickets in match	0
Best bowling	5/28
Catches/stumpings	181/0
- Source: CricketArchive, 5 August 2020

John Auger Dixon (27 May 1861 – 8 June 1931) was an English sportsman who captained Nottinghamshire at first-class cricket and represented the England national football team.

Dixon was a member of the Nottinghamshire which dominated county cricket from 1882 to 1886. He had his best year with the bat in 1897 when he made 1100 runs at 44.00, the only time he would pass 1000 runs in a season. Amongst those runs was his highest first-class score of 268 not out, which he made opening the batting against Sussex at Trent Bridge. Dixon declared once he had passed Arthur Shrewsbury's Nottinghamshire record of 267 with the team score at 448/7 and they won by an innings.

A right-hander, he was captain of Nottinghamshire when they shared the Championship in 1889 with Surrey and Lancashire. The following season, he captained his county to an innings and 26 runs win over the touring Australians and in the same season he also put in a memorable all-round performance against Leicestershire when he scored an unbeaten 126 and took nine wickets for the match. He remained captain until 1899. Dixon was also a useful part-time medium pacer and in 1900 took a career best season tally of 37 wickets at 23.89.

He represented England at his only international on 14 March 1885 when they drew 1–1 with Wales at Leamington Road, Blackburn. Dixon, a left-winger, played his club football for both Notts County and the Corinthians during the 1880s.

Sporting positions
Preceded by Mordecai Sherwin	Nottinghamshire County cricket captain 1889-1899	Succeeded by Arthur Jones
