= Samuel Pethebridge =

Australian general

Brigadier General Sir Samuel Pethebridge KCMG
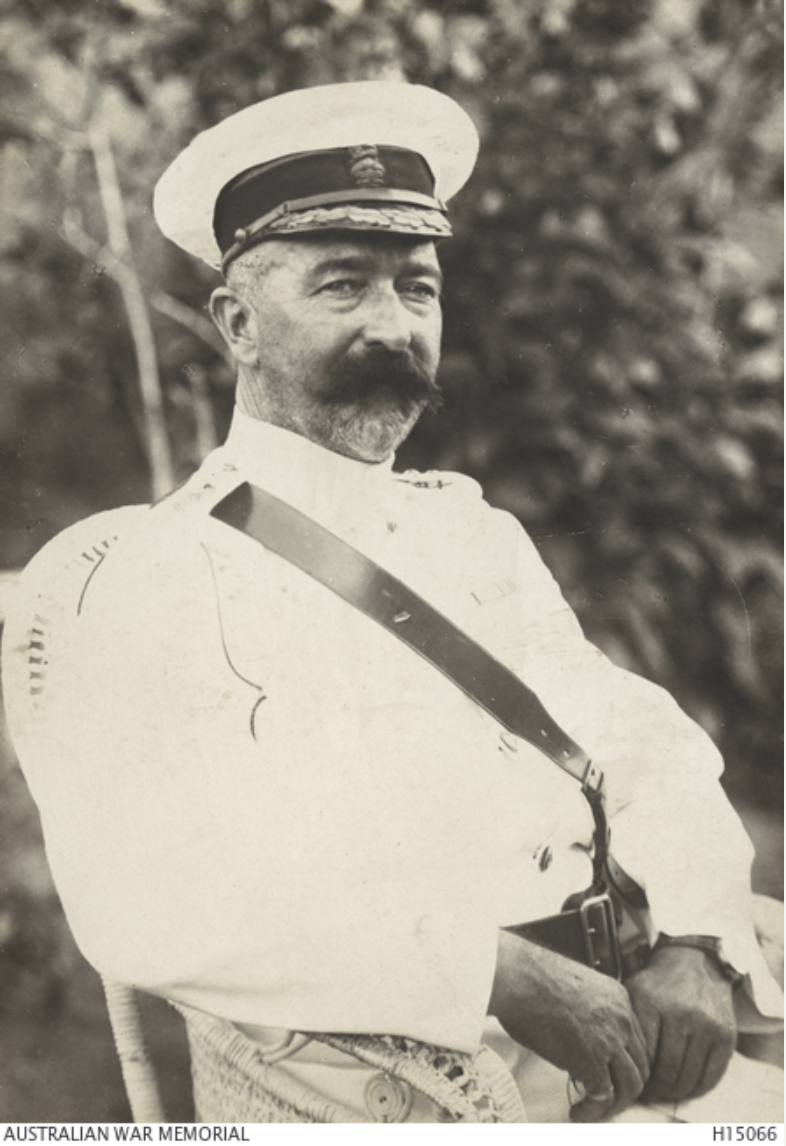
- Pethebridge, military administrator of German New Guinea

Secretary of the Department of Defence
- In office 1910–1918
- Preceded by: Sir Muirhead Collins
- Succeeded by: Thomas Trumble

Personal details
- Born: 3 August 1862 Spring Hill, Queensland
- Died: 26 January 1918 (aged 55) Melbourne, Victoria
- Occupation: Public servant

Military service
- Allegiance: Queensland; Australia
- Branch/service: Queensland Marine Defence Force; Australian Army
- Years of service: 1893–1903; 1914–1918
- Rank: Commander (Navy); Brigadier General (Army)
- Battles/wars: First World War
- Awards: Knight Commander of the Order of St Michael and St George

Brigadier General Sir Samuel Augustus Pethebridge, KCMG (3 August 1862 – 26 January 1918) was senior Australian public servant, serving as the Secretary of the Department of Defence in the period 1910–1918. He was acting Secretary for Sir Muirhead Collins (1906–1910). He was also a military administrator, and an army officer.

Pethebridge died, in office and holding rank as brigadier general, in 1918 aged fifty-five, and was buried at Box Hill Cemetery, Melbourne.

== Early life ==
Pethebridge was born on 3 August 1862 in Spring Hill, Queensland. He was the son of Elizabeth Mary (née Symons) and Henry Lander Pethebridge. His English-born father was a carpenter and lighthousekeeper who was superintendent of the Cape Bowling Green Light near Townsville.

Pethebridge attended state schools in Brisbane and Townsville. He left school in 1876 at the age of fourteen and joined the Queensland Public Service as a junior clerk in the Harbours, Lighthouses and Pilot Department. He subsequently trained as an electric telegraph operator. In 1888, Pethebridge was appointed secretary to the Marine Board of Queensland. He was commissioned as a sub-lieutenant in the Queensland Naval Brigade in 1893 and had reached the rank of commander by the time of his retirement in 1903.

== Federal public service ==
Following the federation of the Australian colonies in 1901, Pethebridge joined the new Commonwealth Public Service as chief clerk in the Department of Defence, responsible to departmental secretary Muirhead Collins. He was appointed acting secretary in 1906 when Collins was seconded to London and replaced him as permanent secretary in 1910.

== German New Guinea ==
Pethebridge was military administrator of German New Guinea from 1915 until his death in 1918, during the Australian occupation of the colony.

== Personal life ==
In 1887, Pethebridge married Mary Ada Simmonds, with whom he had three children.

Government offices
Preceded by Sir Muirhead Collins	Secretary of the Department of Defence; 1910–1918	Succeeded by Thomas Trumble
