= Frederick Shedden =

Australian public servant

Sir Frederick Shedden KCMG OBE

Secretary of the Department of Defence (II)
- In office 17 November 1937 – 13 November 1939
- Preceded by: Malcolm Shepherd
- Succeeded by: Department abolished

Secretary of the Department of Defence Co-ordination
- In office 13 November 1939 – 14 April 1942
- Preceded by: Department established
- Succeeded by: Department abolished

Secretary of the Department of Home Security
- In office 1 July 1941 – December 1941
- Preceded by: Department established
- Succeeded by: Alexander Welch

Secretary of the Department of Defence (III)
- In office 14 April 1942 – 28 October 1956
- Preceded by: Department established
- Succeeded by: Sir Ted Hicks

Personal details
- Born: Frederick Geoffrey Shedden; 8 August 1893 Kyneton, Victoria
- Died: 8 July 1971 (aged 77) East Melbourne, Victoria
- Spouse: Anne Cardno Edward (m. 1927)
- Education: University of Melbourne
- Occupation: Public servant

Sir Frederick Geoffrey Shedden KCMG, OBE (8 August 1893 – 8 July 1971) was an Australian public servant who served as Secretary of the Department of Defence from 1937 to 1956.

== Background and early life ==
Frederick Shedden was born 8 August 1893 in Kyneton, Victoria. His father was George Shedden, a wheelwright born in Victoria. His mother was Sarah Elizabeth (née Grey) from England. He was the youngest of five children.

His was schooled at Kyneton State and Kyneton Grammar schools.

== Career ==
After placing very high in the Commonwealth Public Service examination, in March 1910 Shedden began his career in the Department of Defence at Victoria Barracks, Melbourne. He also studied law at Melbourne University, but the outbreak of World War One ended his studies.

On 19 March 1917 he was appointed a lieutenant in the Australian Army Pay Corps. He served as the 4th Australian Divisions acting paymaster in August. On his return home he was discharged from the Australian Imperial Force on 24 December 1917.

Shedden was Secretary to the Australian Government Department responsible for defence between 1937 and 1956:

- Secretary of the Department of Defence (II) (1937 to 1939)
- Secretary of the Department of Defence Co-ordination (1939 to 1942)
- Secretary of the Department of Home Security (1941)
- Secretary of the Department of Defence (III) (1942 to 1956)

== Private life ==
On 14 December 1927, Shedden married Anne Cardno Edward. Later that same day he sailed for England to study at the Imperial Defence College.

== Awards and honours ==
In the King's Birthday Honours of June 1933, Shedden was appointed an Officer of the Order of the British Empire (OBE). He was also appointed a Companion of the Order of St Michael and St George (CMG) in the New Year's Day Honours of 1941, and knighted as a Knight Commander of the Order of St Michael and St George (KCMG) in the King's Birthday Honours of June 1943.

== Death ==
Shedden died on 8 July 1971 in St Andrew's Hospital, East Melbourne.

He was the subject of a biography, Defence Supremo written by David Horner and published by Allen & Unwin in 2000.

In 2009, a street in the Canberra suburb of Casey was named Shedden Street in his honour.

Government offices
Preceded by Malcolm Shepherd	Secretary of the Department of Defence (II); 1937–1939	Department abolished
New title Department established	Secretary of the Department of Defence Co-ordination; 1939–1942	Department abolished
New title Department established	Acting Secretary of the Department of Home Security; 1941	Succeeded by Alexander Welch
New title Department established	Secretary of the Department of Defence (III); 1942–1956	Succeeded by Sir Ted Hicks
