= John Selby (cricketer) =

English cricketer

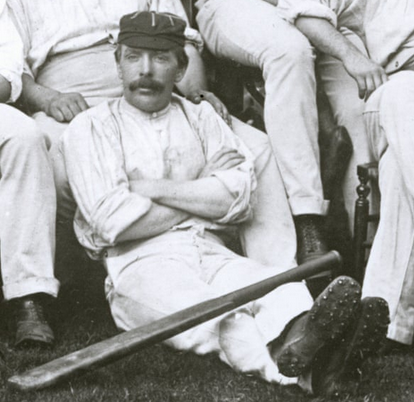
- Selby in 1876

Personal information
- Born: 1 July 1849; Nottingham, England
- Died: 11 March 1894 (aged 44); Nottingham, England
- Batting: Right-handed
- Bowling: Right-arm medium

International information
- National side: England
- Test debut (cap 8): 15 March 1877 v Australia
- Last Test: 14 March 1882 v Australia

Career statistics
Competition	Test	First-class
Matches	6	222
Runs scored	256	6,215
Batting average	23.27	18.83
100s/50s	0/2	4/27
Top score	70	128*
Balls bowled	–	436
Wickets	–	5
Bowling average	–	37.60
5 wickets in innings	–	0
10 wickets in match	–	0
Best bowling	–	2/27
Catches/stumpings	1/0	228/4
- Source: CricInfo, 22 April 2020

John Selby (né Burrows; 1 July 1849 – 11 March 1894) played cricket professionally for Nottinghamshire between 1870 and 1887, and played six Test matches for England between 1877 and 1882.

== Life and career ==
Selby toured Australia in 1876–77 and 1881–82, playing a total of six Test matches on those tours, and he toured North America in 1879. Selby played in the first Test Match in Melbourne in March 1877, opening the batting and keeping wicket. He was the first England batsman to be dismissed in Test cricket. Batting at number three, he scored 55 and 70 in the First Test of the 1881–82 series at the Melbourne Cricket Ground.

In 1878, he headed the English cricket averages with 938 runs at a batting average of 31.82 runs per innings. His highest first-class score was 128 not out for Nottinghamshire against Gloucestershire in 1872.

Selby was a noted sprinter in his younger days, and won several major handicap races. At cricket, when he was not keeping wicket his speed in the outfield made him an excellent fieldsman.

Selby went on to become a pub landlord, but his financial dealings were unsuccessful and led to a run-in with the law. He died after suffering a paralytic stroke in Nottingham General Hospital in 1894. He had a wife, Annie.
