= Ted Hicks =

Australian public servant and diplomat

Sir Ted Hicks CBE

Australian High Commissioner to New Zealand
- In office 1968–1971
- Preceded by: David McNicol
- Succeeded by: Dame Annabelle Rankin

Secretary of the Department of Defence
- In office 28 October 1956 – 5 January 1968
- Preceded by: Sir Frederick Shedden
- Succeeded by: Sir Henry Bland

Secretary of the Department of Air
- In office 22 December 1951 – 1956
- Preceded by: Melville Langslow
- Succeeded by: Tich McFarlane

Personal details
- Born: Edwin William Hick; 9 June 1910 Elsternwick, Victoria
- Died: 14 May 1984 (aged 73) Canberra, Australian Capital Territory
- Resting place: Gungahlin Cemetery
- Spouse(s): Jean MacPherson (m. 1937–59; her death); Lois Una Swindon (m. 1961–84; his death)
- Education: Australian National University
- Occupation: Public servant

Sir Edwin William "Ted" Hicks CBE (9 June 1910 – 14 May 1984) was a senior Australian public servant and diplomat. He was Secretary of the Department of Defence from 1956 to 1968.

== Life and career ==
Ted Hicks was born in Elsternwick, Melbourne, on 9 June 1910. He was educated at Haileybury College and Melbourne Grammar School. Hicks and his parents together moved to Canberra in 1927 and Hicks studied Commerce at the Canberra University College (now known as the Australian National University).

Hicks was appointed Secretary of the Department of Air in 1951, and his effectiveness there led to his appointment in 1956 as head of the Department of Defence, succeeding Frederick Shedden, who had been in the role for many years, including for the entire duration of World War II.

Hicks announced that he would retire from the Department of Defence in December 1967, to be appointed Australian High Commissioner to New Zealand from early 1968.

Hicks died in the Royal Canberra Hospital on 14 May 1984.

== Awards ==
Hicks was made a Commander of the Order of the British Empire in May 1956 for his service as Secretary of the Department of Air. In June 1965, while Secretary of Defence, he was honoured as a Knight Bachelor.

Government offices
Preceded by Melville Langslow	Secretary of the Department of Air; 1951–1956	Succeeded by Tich McFarlane
Preceded by Sir Frederick Shedden	Secretary of the Department of Defence; 1956–1968	Succeeded by Sir Henry Bland
Diplomatic posts
Preceded by David McNicol	Australian High Commissioner to New Zealand; 1968–1971	Succeeded by Dame Annabelle Rankin
