= Robert Trumble =

Australian musician and author (1919–2011)

Robert William Trumble (15 April 1919 – 2 January 2011) was an Australian musician and author. Son of international cricketer Hugh Trumble, Robert dedicated his first book, The Golden Age of Cricket, to his father. It was published in Melbourne in 1968.

Trumble's musical career was also noted by the Australian media. In 2003 he was awarded the Chevalier dans l'Ordre des Arts et des Lettres for reviving the work of Vincent d'Indy. He had previously spent thirty years as a concert manager for the Australian Broadcasting Corporation. He was also commissioned to write for the British Music Society in 2004, and also published a biography of d'Indy, Vincent d'Indy: His Greatness and His Integrity in 1994 and The Compositions of Vincent d'Indy in 2000.
