= Department of Defence Co-ordination =

Australian government department, 1939–1942

Department overview
- Formed: 13 November 1939
- Preceding Department: Department of Defence (II)
- Dissolved: 14 April 1942
- Superseding Department: Department of Defence (III)
- Jurisdiction: Commonwealth of Australia
- Headquarters: Victoria
- Ministers responsible: Robert Menzies, Minister (1939–1941); Arthur Fadden, Minister (1941); John Curtin, Minister (1941–1942)
- Department executive: Frederick Shedden, Secretary

The Department of Defence Co-ordination was an Australian government department that existed between November 1939 and April 1942.

== History ==
The department was formed shortly after Australia declared war on Germany in September 1939, joining World War II. In November 1939 the Department of Defence (II) was separated into the Department of Defence Co-ordination and Departments of Air, Navy and Army.

== Scope ==
Information about the department's functions and government funding allocation could be found in the Administrative Arrangements Orders, the annual budget statements and in the Department's annual reports.

When it was established, the Department dealt with:

- Defence policy
- Administrative co-ordination and review
- Financial Co-ordination and review
- Works Co-ordination and review
- Commonwealth War Book
- Civilian defence and State Co-operation

== Structure ==
The Department was a Commonwealth Public Service department, staffed by officials who were responsible to the Minister for Defence Co-ordination: Robert Menzies (1939 to 1941) and John Curtin (1941 to 1942).

The Secretary of the Department was Frederick Shedden.
