= Department of Air =

Australian government department, 1939–1973

Department overview
- Formed: 13 November 1939
- Preceding Department: Department of Defence
- Dissolved: 30 November 1973
- Superseding Department: Department of Defence
- Jurisdiction: Commonwealth of Australia
- Department executives: Melville Langslow, Secretary (1939–1951); Ted Hicks, Secretary (1951–1956); Tich McFarlane, Secretary (1956–1968); Frederick Green, Secretary (1968–1971)

The Department of Air is a former Australian federal government department. Created on 13 November 1939 following the outbreak of the Second World War, it assumed control of the administration and finance of the Royal Australian Air Force (RAAF) from the Department of Defence. Following the war its functions were expanded to include responsibility for air defence as well as the organisation and control of the RAAF. The department was abolished by the Second Whitlam Ministry on 30 November 1973 when the single service departments were once again amalgamated, with its role assumed by the Air Office within the Department of Defence.

== See also ==
- Minister for Air (Australia)
