= Bobby Peel =

English cricketer (1857–1941)

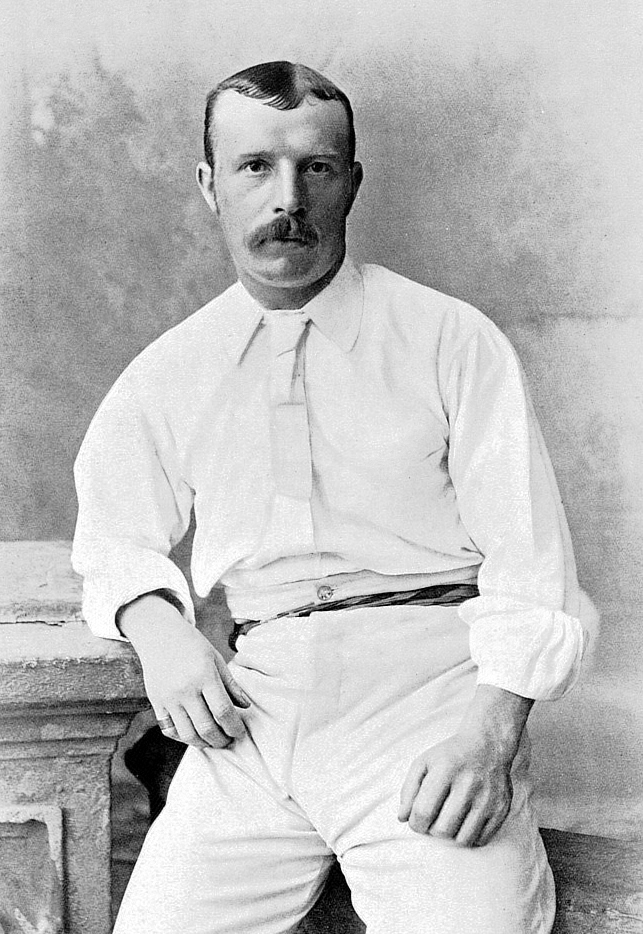
- Bobby Peel c. 1895

Personal information
- Born: 12 February 1857; Churwell, Yorkshire, England
- Died: 12 August 1941 (aged 84); Morley, West Riding of Yorkshire, England
- Batting: Left-handed
- Bowling: Slow left-arm orthodox

International information
- National side: England
- Test debut (cap 50): 12 December 1884 v Australia
- Last Test: 12 August 1896 v Australia

Domestic team information
- Years: Team
- 1883–1897: Yorkshire

Career statistics
Competition	Tests	First-class
Matches	20	436
Runs scored	427	12,191
Batting average	14.72	19.44
100s/50s	0/3	7/48
Top score	83	210*
Balls bowled	5,216	88,721
Wickets	101	1,775
Bowling average	16.98	16.20
5 wickets in innings	5	123
10 wickets in match	1	33
Best bowling	7/31	9/22
Catches/stumpings	17/0	214/0
- Source: Cricinfo, 8 January 2014

Robert Peel (12 February 1857 – 12 August 1941) was an English professional cricketer who played first-class cricket for Yorkshire between 1883 and 1897. Primarily a left-arm spin bowler, Peel was also an effective left-handed batsman who played in the middle order. Between 1884 and 1896, he was regularly selected to represent England, playing 20 Test matches in which he took 101 wickets. Over the course of his career, he scored 12,191 runs and took 1,775 wickets in first-class cricket. A match-winning bowler, particularly when conditions favoured his style, Peel generally opened the attack, an orthodox tactic for a spinner at the time, and was highly regarded by critics.

Peel began playing for Yorkshire in 1883 but, after a successful debut, was overshadowed in the team by Edmund Peate and often played only a minor role with the ball. Improvements in his batting and his excellence as a fielder kept him in the team, and when Peate was sacked for drunkenness in 1887, Peel became Yorkshire's main spinner. He had already played for England, touring Australia with two professional teams, although he did not play a Test in England until 1888. Over the following years he regularly took over 100 wickets each season and often played in the prestigious Gentlemen v Players matches. He was generally Yorkshire's leading bowler—until the emergence of George Hirst, he generally received little support from other members of the attack—and often among their leading batsmen. His best season in county cricket came in 1896, when he recorded the double of 1,000 runs and 100 wickets, and made his highest first-class score of 210. Among his notable feats in Tests, he bowled England to victory after they had followed on in Australia in 1894–95 and took six for 23 in his final Test. The first English cricketer to reach 100 wickets against Australia, in 1894–95 he also became the first player to fail to score in four successive Test innings.

As a player, Peel was very popular and admirers often entertained him socially; he became well known for liking alcohol. On the morning of the match that England won after following on, Peel was intoxicated and had to be sobered up. In 1897, he was suspended by Yorkshire for drunkenness during a match. Although it is unclear what exactly happened—Peel said he slipped when fielding, but Hirst later recalled that he came on the field drunk and when asked to leave, bowled a ball in the wrong direction—he never played for the county again. Decades later, a widely circulated story suggested that Peel urinated on the pitch before being sent away. Historians consider the story unlikely, and attribute it to a misunderstanding by its reporter. Peel continued to play and coach cricket for most of his life and in later years became associated with Yorkshire once again. Among his other jobs, he became the landlord of a public house and worked in a mill. He died in 1941 at the age of 84.

== Early career ==
=== Yorkshire cricketer ===
Peel was born in Churwell, a village close to Morley, on 12 February 1857. He was the son of a miner, and Peel himself worked in the mines for a time. From the age of 16, he played with increasing frequency for the Churwell cricket team, and by 1882 was part of the Yorkshire Colts. At the time, Edmund Peate was the first-choice left-arm spin bowler in the Yorkshire team, and his presence restricted Peel's opportunities. An injury to Peate allowed Peel to make his first-class debut for Yorkshire against Surrey at Sheffield on 10 July 1882. Peel took nine wickets in the game, including five for 83 (five wickets taken while conceding 83 runs) in the second innings. Lord Hawke—who assumed the captaincy of Yorkshire later that season—subsequently described Peel's debut as one of the most impressive for Yorkshire.

Peel played regularly alongside Peate between 1883 and 1886. He had a junior role, and his bowling was used sparingly; in five seasons he took 163 wickets for Yorkshire, and only took more than 50 first-class wickets in a season once before 1887. His obituary in Wisden Cricketers' Almanack in 1942 stated: "Yorkshire were singularly rich in bowling talent, so that [Peel] had to wait several years before attaining real distinction". Peel retained his place through his ability as a batsman and fielder; in his history of Yorkshire County Cricket Club, R. S. Holmes judges that Peel was "brilliant" as a fielder and that it was "probably the marked improvement in [his] batting which first secured him a place in the County eleven." He had occasional success with the ball, for example taking eleven for 87 in the match against Gloucestershire in 1884—a match in which Peate did not play. Meanwhile, his batting average gradually improved until it reached the mid-20s in 1887.

=== Test debut ===
During the English winter of 1884–85, Peel was included in the team which toured Australia under the management of Alfred Shaw, Arthur Shrewsbury and James Lillywhite. English teams that toured Australia at this time were not composed exclusively of the best cricketers in England. The 1884–85 English team, like most earlier tours, contained only professional cricketers; less usually, the team contained nine players who, critics judged, would likely have been in a full-strength England side. Much of the cricket was overshadowed by off-field clashes with the Australian team that had toured England in 1884; the disputes mainly concerned each team's share of match receipts. Peel was required to bowl a large number of overs; in minor matches, mainly played against the odds (where the opposition teams included more players than the English team), he took 321 wickets at an average of less than five. In first-class matches, he was the leading wicket-taker with 35 wickets, but his average of 19.22 was relatively high.

During the tour, Peel made his Test debut and played all five matches. His first Test began on 12 December 1884. Opening the bowling, took eight wickets in the match; in the second innings, he took five for 51 on a pitch affected by rain. He was less effective in the remaining games, ending the series with 21 wickets at an average of 21.47, and scored 37 runs at an average of 7.40. He was not selected in the next Test matches played by England, against Australia in 1886, and missed the next English tour of Australia, in the winter of 1886–87, again organised by Shaw, Shrewsbury and Lillywhite.

== Leading bowler ==
=== Main Yorkshire spinner ===
A team photograph of Yorkshire's 1884 side: Peel is second from the right in the middle row. Edmund Peate is far left in the back row.

In the mid-1880s, the Yorkshire team was generally inconsistent. In 1886, Lord Hawke became Yorkshire's full-time captain. One of his first actions, with the support of the Yorkshire committee, was to sack Peate early in the 1887 season. At the time, many professional cricketers drank heavily and the Yorkshire team had many players who liked alcohol. (Note: The team at the time has been described as "Ten drunkards and a parson", the parson being a teetotal lay preacher who was part of the team.) Peate had been the chief offender for some years, and while he remained Yorkshire's leading left-arm spinner, his disruptive influence and disregard for authority was having a negative effect on the team. The historian Mick Pope suggests that Hawke may have felt able to act as he knew that Peel was available as a replacement. With Peate unavailable, Peel began to play a leading role. In the 1887 season, a year in which good weather produced conditions generally in favour of batsmen, he took 85 wickets at an average of 17.32. He also improved his record with the bat, scoring 835 runs at 25.30. According to his Wisden obituary, he recorded at least two match-winning performances that season: against Kent he took five for 14 and scored 43 runs in a low-scoring game; in the match against Leicestershire he took eleven wickets for 51. (Note: The match against Leicestershire was not first-class but is specifically mentioned in Peel's Wisden obituary as a noteworthy performance.) Twice in 1887, Peel appeared for the professional Players in their prestigious match against the Gentlemen, the first time he had been selected for the team. He played regularly for them until 1897.

During the winter of 1887–88, the Melbourne Cricket Club organised another English tour of Australia. The team was mainly composed of amateurs, but Peel was included with three other professionals. At the same time, a rival English team, organised by Shaw, Shrewsbury and Lillywhite, also toured Australia. The resulting confusion affected the attendances at games and the financial success of both tours. The lack of success for the Australian team in this period lessened the quality of Tests and, amid declining spectator interest, touring teams no longer generated profits. In his history of early international cricket, Malcolm Knox observes that "two England teams were coming when Australian cricket was not strong enough to host one". Peel took 49 first-class wickets on the tour, finishing second in the bowling averages for the team, and scored 449 runs in first-class matches at an average of 34.53, which placed him second in the batting averages. Although various matches were played by both teams against combined Australian teams, only one official Test match was played on the tour. The best eleven players from both English teams combined to defeat an Australian team which had several leading players missing; later writers questioned whether the match should have the status of a Test. Peel took nine wickets in the match, including five for 18 in the first innings as Australia were bowled out for 42 runs.

=== Home Test matches ===
In 1888, an unusually rainy summer led to wet pitches which made batting difficult. Peel took 171 first-class wickets, the first time he had passed 100 wickets in a season, at an average of 12.22. He also topped the Yorkshire bowling averages for county matches. His best performance came against Nottinghamshire, when he took eight for 12 in the first innings on the way to fourteen for 33 in the match; for the Players against the Gentlemen, he took six for 34. In the season, Peel scored 669 runs at 13.38. That year, an Australian team toured England and Peel was chosen for his first Test matches in England. The Australian team, missing several key players, won the first Test match before England recovered to win the final two games. Playing all three Tests, Peel took 24 wickets at an average of 7.54. In the decisive third Test, he took seven for 31 in the first Australian innings and finished with match figures of eleven for 68. Wisden noted that Peel "bowled remarkably well" in the second Test; it stated that, in the third, "the Australians were helpless against Peel" and judged his overall performance "altogether admirable". Peel's performance in 1888 resulted in his selection, prior to the 1889 season, as one of Wisden's "Six Great Bowlers"; this was the first time Wisden had made the award which in later years became the prestigious Wisden Cricketer of the Year. The citation said: "During his early career [Peel] was contemporary with Peate, and naturally did not get the same chances that have fallen to his lot during the last two years. He has won his way to the very front rank by sheer merit, and bats and fields so well that he would be worth playing in any eleven if he could not get a wicket."

Yorkshire had a poor season in 1889, finishing second-from-last in the list of counties; writing in 1904, Holmes described this as "the low-water mark of Yorkshire cricket". The team lost twelve games and won eight, affected by the decline of several leading players. The fielding was poor; Peel had twelve catches dropped from his bowling in one game. Only Peel had a good season, and Holmes pondered: "Where would Yorkshire have been without Peel?" He took 130 wickets at an average of 16.39; with the bat, he scored 991 runs, his best seasonal aggregate to that point, at an average of 22.02. He came top of both the Yorkshire batting and bowling averages and had three times more wickets than any other player. Additionally, he was the only player in the team to score a century in matches against another county; against Middlesex at Lord's, he scored 158 runs, his maiden first-class hundred. At the end of the season, Hawke ended the careers of several players; the Yorkshire president told the committee that the "demon drink" was to blame.

In 1890, Peel took 171 wickets at an average of 13.71 and scored 817 runs at 18.56. He missed several Yorkshire games while playing representative matches, but was comfortably their leading bowler with 91 wickets for the county—the next best figure was 37 wickets. The Australians toured England again that year, and Peel took six wickets in the first Test at Lord's. The touring team's results were poor, which resulted in a loss of prestige for the Test matches. The newly formed County Championship was a rival attraction, and several players were withdrawn from the England team to play for their counties—Andrew Stoddart, for example, was withdrawn by Middlesex before the first Test. With Middlesex due to play Yorkshire, Stoddart was also withdrawn from the second Test; upon finding this out, Lord Hawke withdrew his Yorkshire players from the England XI, including Peel. In the Middlesex–Yorkshire game, Peel dismissed Stoddart twice. The third Test was rained off completely.

During the 1891 season, Peel took 99 wickets at 17.35 and scored 971 runs at 24.27, including his second first-class century, but Yorkshire again performed poorly. This prompted a reorganisation of the club over the following two years. Peel led the Yorkshire batting averages and came second in the bowling. In the winter of 1891–92, he was included in the touring team to Australia organised by Lord Sheffield and captained by W. G. Grace. He came fourth in the team's bowling averages with 15 wickets at 18.86 and finished fifth in the batting averages with 229 runs at 25.44. He played in all three Test matches, taking six wickets at 21.33, and scoring 134 runs at 26.80. In the third game, he scored 83, his first Test match fifty, but did not bowl; the Lancashire cricketer Johnny Briggs bowled Australia out on a rain-damaged pitch but this was England's only victory as Australia won the series 2–1.

In first-class matches during 1892, Peel scored 772 runs at 19.79 and took 121 wickets at 16.80. Additionally, in a non-first-class games against Leicestershire, he scored 226 as well as taking five wickets in Leicestershire's first innings. In the 1893 season, he took slightly more wickets at a lower average (126 at 14.51) but his run aggregate fell to 550 runs at 13.75. He was part of a successful Yorkshire team. The county won their first official County Championship title and the team was no longer as dependent on Peel with the ball—Ted Wainwright took more wickets than he did. The Australians toured England once again, but Peel played in just one of the three Test matches. He did not take a wicket, did little with the bat, and was left out of the team for the second Test. As the Australians had proved poor on the field, Lord Hawke withdrew Peel and Stanley Jackson from the team for the third Test so that they could play for Yorkshire. In 1894, Peel scored 699 runs at 16.25, failing to score a half-century. With the ball, he took 145 wickets at 13.44. During the season, he was awarded a benefit match at Bradford, which raised £2,000. The retirement of George Ulyett that season made Peel the team's senior professional, an important position at the time.

=== Australian tour of 1894–95 ===
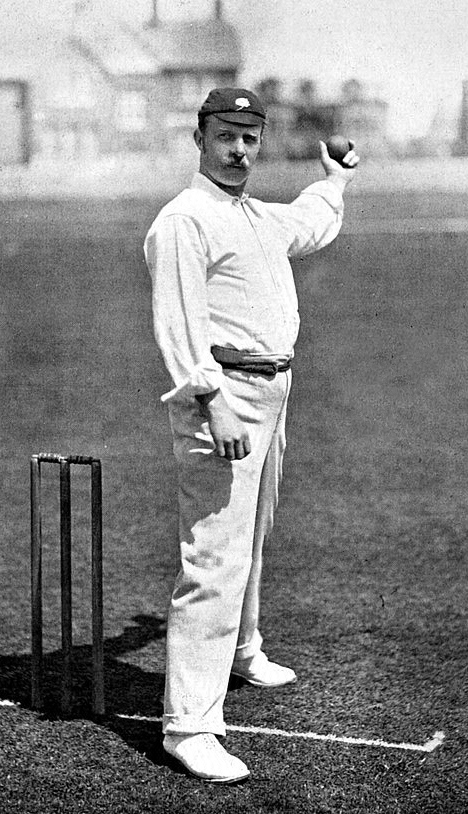
Peel c. 1895.

During the 1894 season, the Melbourne Cricket Club and the trustees of the Sydney Cricket Ground combined to organise another English tour of Australia. They asked Andrew Stoddart to raise a team, and Peel was chosen. Peel was successful in the opening first-class matches of the tour. He took five wickets in an innings against South Australia, Victoria and New South Wales; after three games, he had taken 23 wickets, and he and Briggs provided the main threat with the ball. Against Victoria, Peel also scored 48 and 65 with the bat. He played a leading role in the first Test, which Wisden described as "probably the most sensational match ever played either in Australia or in England". Australia scored 586 in their first innings; England scored 325 and, following-on, scored 437 to leave a target of 177 to win. At the end of the fifth day's play, Australia had scored 113 for two, and were overwhelming favourites to win.

Until then, Peel had been ineffective in the match. Several of the England team, including Peel, drank heavily in the night thinking the game was lost, but overnight rain drastically changed the nature of the pitch. Peel had not sobered up when play was scheduled to start, although Stoddart had given him a cold shower to speed up the process, and arrived late. As another player was also missing, the start was delayed; this allowed the pitch to dry further and therefore become more sticky and difficult to bat on. Peel had slept through the overnight storm and was astonished when he saw the state of the pitch, suspecting someone had watered it. He reportedly said: "Gi' me t'ball, Mr Stoddart. Ah'll get t'buggers out before lunch". (Note: The quote is reported differently in the sources. Peel's Wisden obituary renders it: "Mr. Stoddart, gie me t' ball"; David Frith records it as both "Give me the ball, Mr Stoddart, and I'll get t'boogers out before loonch!" and "Gi' me t'ball, Mr Stoddart. Ah'll get t'boogers out." Malcolm Knox records it "Give me the ball, Mr Stoddart, and I'll have the buggers out before lunch".) With Briggs, Peel bowled Australia out, taking five wickets to go with the one he took the previous evening to finish with six for 67. Australia scored 166 and lost by ten runs. One Australian newspaper reported that Peel "found the match rather a trying one, and came in fairly done up". The English team were praised for fighting back, but the role of the weather was acknowledged, and some critics blamed the Australians for batting badly in the second innings.

England won the second Test; after both teams' first innings were low-scoring, Peel, appearing at number six, batted for 150 minutes in the second innings to score 53 without hitting any fours. Stoddart's 173 set Australia a big target, and Peel took four for 77 to bowl England to a 94-run win. Australia won the third Test by 382 runs; Peel took four wickets in the game, but was dismissed in both innings without scoring. It is possible that around this time, Peel was threatened by Stoddart with expulsion from the tour owing to his drinking. (Note: Frith quotes a newspaper report in which an unnamed player is stated to have been so warned by Stoddart. Frith speculates that this may have been Peel.) Australia won the fourth Test to level the series at 2–2. In very favourable bowling conditions, Peel took three for 74 but Australia totalled 284. England were bowled out twice to give Australia an innings victory, and Peel suffered his second consecutive pair (i.e. failing to score in either innings). He was the first player to score four successive ducks in Test cricket, a succession of failures not repeated until 1936, and this remained the record number of successive ducks until 1985.

Amid great public interest—the game was advertised as "the match of the century"—and great tension, the decisive final Test match was played. Peel took four wickets in Australia's first innings, then scored 73 runs in England's first innings, sharing a 162-run partnership with Archie MacLaren. In Australia's second innings, Peel took three more wickets to return match figures of seven for 203 in 94 overs. Jack Brown scored a century to guide England towards a target of 297, and Peel eventually hit the winning runs. Peel ended the series with 27 wickets at 26.70, second in the averages behind Tom Richardson, and 168 runs at 18.67, placing him sixth in the batting averages. David Frith suggests that this series was vital in establishing the importance of Test cricket, and that the interest felt in both England and Australia, and the coverage by the press, set up the pattern and expectations of future Test series. In all first-class games, Peel scored 421 runs at 21.05, to be eighth in the averages, and took 57 wickets at 25.28, placing him third in the averages behind Richardson and Briggs, although the latter had fewer wickets.

=== Final seasons ===
Returning to England for the 1895 season, Peel took 180 wickets, the most he took in any season, at an average of 14.97. This included the best figures of his career when he took nine for 22 against Somerset; in total he took fifteen wickets in that match, and Wisden described this performance as "causing a sensation". He led the Yorkshire bowling averages, and George Hirst became his regular partner opening the bowling. Both men took over 130 wickets for Yorkshire that season and the pair established an effective bowling partnership until the end of Peel's career. With the bat in 1895, Peel scored 847 runs at 17.28. In 1896, Peel performed the double of 1,000 runs and 100 wickets for the only time in his first-class career. In a dry summer which favoured batsmen, his wickets came at a higher average: he took 128 at 17.50, but he scored 1,206 runs at 30.15, his best batting aggregate and average in an English season. He came third in the Yorkshire batting averages, and often succeeded in scoring runs when the team were under pressure. Against Warwickshire, he scored 210 not out, the highest first-class innings of his career, and one of four centuries in the innings, out of a Yorkshire total of 887. A contemporary critic described Peel's innings as the best ever played by a left-hander. He shared a partnership of 292 for the eighth wicket with Lord Hawke. As of 2017, this remains Yorkshire's highest partnership for that wicket, and the fifth-highest eighth-wicket partnership recorded in first-class cricket. He also took a hat-trick against Kent.

The Australians played three Tests in England in 1896, but Peel only played in the final one. Before the match, several English professionals—not including Peel—threatened to strike, but the dispute was settled. Then, before the third day of the game, the pitch was mysteriously watered, becoming very difficult for batting. Australia only needed a small total, but Peel believed that he could bowl them out. He took six of the last seven Australian wickets at a cost of 23 runs to bowl England to victory; in recognition of this achievement, Stanley Jackson, a teammate in this game, gave him a gold watch-chain ornament. He was less successful with the bat, scoring a pair once again. This was his final Test match. In total, Peel played 20 Tests, scoring 427 runs at an average of 14.72 and taking 101 wickets at 16.98.

In January 1897, the Australian Fred Spofforth claimed in a letter to the Sporting Life that Peel occasionally threw the ball, an accusation he also levelled at Tom McKibbin, an Australian bowler. Spofforth wrote that Peel "has no need to resort to throwing. I acknowledge that he does not often take to it, still, it is well known to cricketers that at times he does 'shy' [throw]." Peel denied this and claimed that leading umpires would support him.

== Dismissal by Yorkshire ==
In the 1897 season, Peel was suspended by Yorkshire for drunkenness. Alcohol was popular with many professional cricketers, and the careers of several Yorkshire players in this period, including Peate, had been ended for this reason. Peel was always known to be a heavy drinker, but his behaviour had been tolerated. His fame, brought about by his performances, made the problem worse. Derek Hodgson, in the official Yorkshire club history, writes: "A cheerful, gregarious man, [Peel] took to hospitality and entertaining with alacrity and moved in such society, particularly in London, that when one of the foremost journalists of the day asked to see him he was fobbed off by a man who announced himself as 'Peel's secretary', adding: 'He does not like interviews and has little to say. He sent me to take his place.'" Hodgson observes: "It is not impossible, of course, that Bobby was either shy, or 'indisposed' at that particular moment", and suggests that Peel's downfall, like Peate's before him, was because he "was too often the toast of the town".

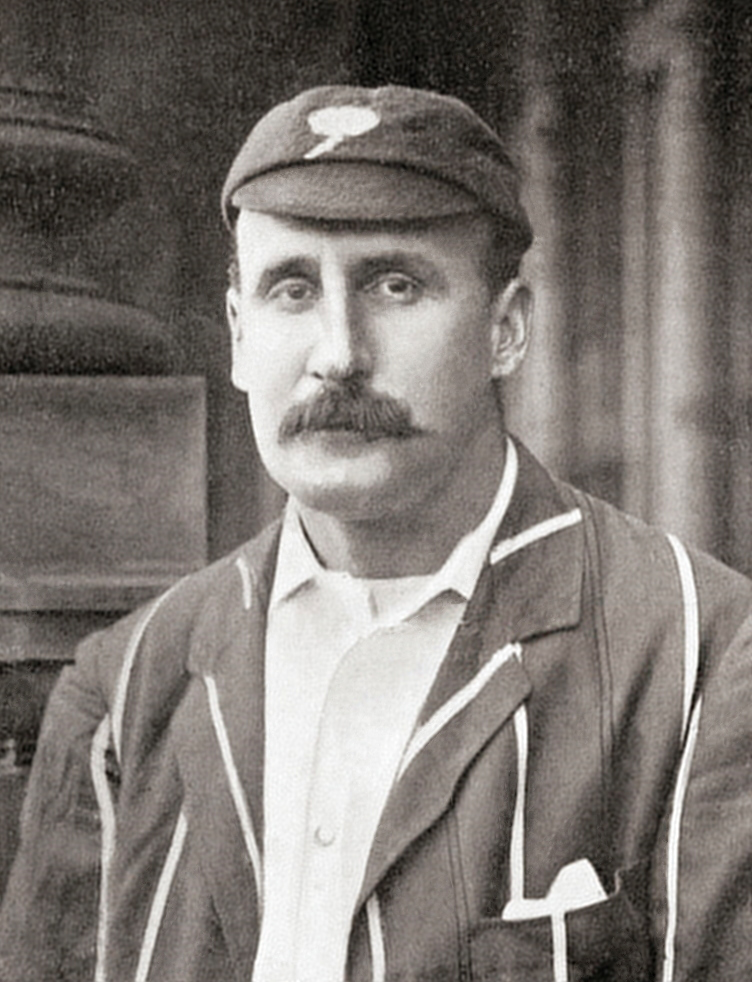
Lord Hawke, Yorkshire's captain, was probably largely responsible for Peel's suspension.

In 1897, Peel had played regularly until July with some success. He scored 115 against Leicestershire, and took eight for 53 against Kent. He then suffered an injury in a match against Lancashire that caused him to miss around a month of cricket. (Note: The publication Cricket reported that Peel was making "his first appearance after a long illness" when he played his final game for Yorkshire. The Times states that he had "presumably recovered from the severe injury he received" against Lancashire.) He returned to the Yorkshire team to play Middlesex at Sheffield on 16 August. In Middlesex's first innings, Peel took five for 71, but on the third day, (Note: Peel bowled in Middlesex's second innings, which took place on the third and final day of the game.) he appeared on the field drunk. Later that day, the Yorkshire committee met and resolved to suspend Peel for the remainder of the season for "presenting himself on the field in a state of intoxication". According to Anthony Woodhouse, in his history of Yorkshire County Cricket Club, this was not Peel's first such offence. Contemporary accounts give no indication of trouble on the field involving Peel, but the influential Lord Hawke may have encouraged the press to remain silent. The decision to suspend Peel was made public on 19 August, the following day.

There are several conflicting versions of what happened on the field in the Middlesex game. On the morning of 19 August, replying to suggestions that he was drunk, Peel spoke to a newspaper reporter and stated: "Before I went on the ground at Sheffield—I don't blush to say it—I had two small glasses of gin and water. At luncheon time I had nothing". Peel said that he opened the bowling with Stanley Jackson and was eventually rested without a word being said to him. He stated that he later slipped twice while fielding, but the cause was that the spikes on his boots were broken. That evening, when he went to collect his wages at the end of the game, the Yorkshire secretary, Joseph Wolstenholme, informed him of the suspension on the grounds that his play was "unsatisfactory", and when pressed by Peel for an explanation, he told him: "You have had a glass too much".

The cricket writer A. A. Thompson relates a different story told to him fifty years later by Hirst, who played in the match. According to this account, Hirst was having breakfast when Peel came in drunk. Anxious that Peel would be seen, and worried about bringing the team into disrepute, Hirst forced Peel to return to bed and went to the ground, where he told Lord Hawke that Peel had been taken ill in the night and would not be able to play. Hawke promised to see Peel that evening and took the twelfth man onto the field. According to Thompson, when Hirst went onto the field, he saw "with dawning dismay that there were not eleven fieldsmen present but twelve. There, his face red, his cap awry, the ball in his hand, stood Peel". Peel was even more drunk than at breakfast, and Hawke ordered him from the field. Peel replied that he was fine, and according to Hirst bowled a ball to demonstrate his fitness, but in his confusion did so in the wrong direction. Peel was then led from the field. After falling asleep in the hotel, he was advised by Hirst to apologise to Lord Hawke, but refused, claiming that he was indispensable to the team and would be recalled. (Note: Several details from Hirst's story do not match what happened in the Middlesex match: he gives a different opponent and venue, and claims the events happened on the first day, which could not have been the case in the Middlesex game. This has led David Warner, in his history of Yorkshire County Cricket Club, to suggest that Peel was actually dismissed from the field at the start of the following match, against Derbyshire.)

A different, widely circulated story suggests that Peel urinated on the pitch before being dismissed by Hawke. Woodhouse, writing in 1989, suggested that "it is difficult to ascertain the truth behind this long-standing tale", while Hodgson observes: "I have never been convinced of this account because it has always seemed to be so much out of character for a cricketer of that time when so much stress was placed upon behaving 'like a gentleman' even in one's cups." Mick Pope writes: "The more recent accusation that Peel urinated on the pitch remains unjust, unproven and such a myth ... that it should have no place in any study of Bobby Peel, the cricketer." The story originated in a cricket publication, Cricket Quarterly, in 1968. The historian Rowland Bowen, in an article called "Fresh Light on the Dismissal of R Peel in 1897", claimed that an "aged Yorkshireman of 85" told him that Peel had urinated and that this was a common practice then. Subsequent research by the historian Irving Rosewater established that Bowen's information came to him second-hand. The 85-year-old had not used the word "urinated" but had actually said "pissed at the wicket", meaning that Peel was drunk ("pissed" being slang for drunk) on the pitch ("at the wicket"). Rosewater suggests that this was merely repetition of the already known story, not the new information claimed by Bowen. Rosewater self-published his findings in a book called An Unjust Slur on Bobby Peel in 1997.

Peel, having concluded that the suspension would end his Yorkshire career, signed a contract to play for Accrington Cricket Club. He told a newspaper that he regarded his suspension as unfair, that he had been given no opportunity to explain, and that he had taken the appointment with Accrington to provide for himself and his family. In 1900, he told Cricket magazine that, before his suspension, he had been bedridden for three weeks as a result of an injury he suffered while batting, that he played against Middlesex with some success and was then suspended without any explanation. He later said of the incident: "[Lord Hawke] put his arm around me and escorted me off the field and out of Yorkshire cricket. What a gentleman". The journalist Harry Pearson suggests that this was "either very gracious, or exceedingly sarcastic." Hawke later described Peel's sacking as "the most decisive action of my whole career ... It had to be done for the sake of discipline and the good of cricket. Nothing ever gave me so much pain." At the time, Hawke believed these events cost Yorkshire the County Championship, but the team had only two more games to play in that season's competition, and it was mathematically impossible for them to win. Hirst told Thompson that Hawke was always sorry that Peel had to be sacked, and that whenever the pair met afterwards, they remained friends and that neither bore the other any animosity. Although Peel considered himself indispensable, the following year he was replaced by Wilfred Rhodes, who remained in the team until 1930 and took 4,184 first-class wickets. Peel remained popular with the people of Morley in the aftermath of his dismissal, and they supported him rather than believing the reports.

== Later life ==
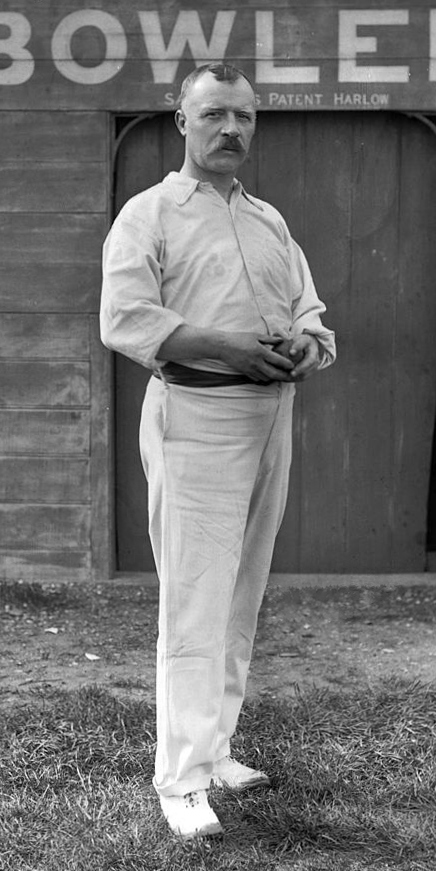
Peel c. 1905

Peel made two further first-class appearances in 1897 after his suspension by Yorkshire. He played in two end-of-season festival games at Hastings, first for the North against the South and then for the Players against the Gentlemen, but did little with bat or ball. In all first-class games that year he took 72 wickets at 19.51 and scored 566 runs at 22.64. His only other appearances in first-class cricket came in 1899, when he played for A. J. Webbe's XI against Oxford University and for an England XI against the touring Australians. He ended his first-class career with 12,191 first-class runs at an average of 19.44 and 1,775 wickets at 16.20.

In 1898, Peel played for Accrington. His signing was widely reported in the press. Before this, most professionals in league cricket were neither famous names nor particularly good cricketers. According to Pearson, in his survey of club cricket in the north of England, Peel was the first international cricketer to play in a league. He took 80 wickets that season, but only received a third of his salary; the committee withheld the rest because of unspecified problems during the season. His contract was not renewed and he instead became the professional at Morley. Pearson suggests that Peel's signing showed the clubs that big-name signings could bring benefits. Peel also accepted a position as a coach at Essex in 1899, and remained there until at least 1904. The press suggested that he would qualify for Essex, but he never played for that team. He later became the landlord of a public house in Churwell. In 1923 he resumed his connection with Yorkshire when he undertook a coaching and scouting programme for the county, in association with George Hirst, organised by the Yorkshire Evening News. Peel remained close to the Yorkshire players. When the four Yorkshire members of the English team that toured Australia in 1932–33 departed from Leeds, Peel was present and gave each of them a white rose—the symbol of Yorkshire. He attended the funeral of Roy Kilner in 1928, and was one of many Yorkshire cricketers to attend the memorial service for Lord Hawke in 1938. Peel continued to play cricket and coach locally into his seventies. In his later years, he worked in a woollen mill in Morley.

Peel was married in 1878; he and his wife, Annie Louise, were married for over fifty years and had four children, one of whom was killed in the First World War. Peel's wife died in 1933. Peel lived until 1941, when he died at the house of his daughter. Among those who attended his funeral were Hirst and Rhodes.

== Technique and personality ==
Wisden said that as a bowler, Peel had a "fine length, easy action and splendid command of spin", which meant that he "was often a match-winner". Peel consistently bowled a good length and varied the flight of the ball to deceive batsmen. He also bowled a quicker ball which, in contrast to his usual delivery, travelled in a straight line instead of turning. On a pitch affected by rain, batsmen found him very difficult to face, and he was very successful in these conditions. When bowling on pitches where the ball came more slowly off the surface, Peel often bowled faster; this pace made it difficult for batsmen to score runs against him even when conditions were in their favour. After he delivered the ball, the spin he imparted often made it curve in the air before it reached the batsman. According to Woodhouse, when bowling, "Peel brought his arm behind his back with a peculiar flourish-like action and then 'whipped the ball down'". He generally opened the bowling, including when he played for England. At the time, it was general practice to open the bowling with a fast bowler and a left-arm spinner.

Peel was the first English bowler to take 100 Test wickets against Australia. At a time when international matches were relatively rare, his 20 Test matches were a considerable achievement, and it was unusual for a player to tour Australia as often as he did: he went there four times. His main rival as a spinner and for a place in the England team was Johnny Briggs; Peel bowled faster, which made him harder to hit. Archie MacLaren, who captained England from the late 1890s and was a team-mate and captain of Briggs, described Peel as "the cleverest bowler of my time". MacLaren stated that Peel thoroughly understood tactics and could spot weaknesses in a batsman's technique. He concluded: "I place Peel first on my list of great left-handed bowlers on account of his wonderful judgement, his diabolical cleverness and his great natural ability." When Rhodes took over the role of left-arm spin bowler in the Yorkshire team, there was some debate over who out of Peate, Peel and Rhodes was the best left-arm spinner to play for Yorkshire. Historians regard Peel as part of a long-lasting chain of successful Yorkshire left-arm spinners, preceded by Peate and succeeded by Rhodes.

Wisden described Peel as a "punishing left-handed batsman". Batting in the middle order, he was often effective when other batsmen had failed. For England, he most often batted at number six. Wisden also called him "a capital fieldsman, especially at cover-point".

During his playing days, Peel was famous and well-respected—the actor Henry Ainley claimed that the highlight of his life was carrying Peel's bag. According to the historian David Frith, Peel was not a considerate husband. Frith also suggests that he was sometimes involved in embarrassing situations; for example, when Ranjitsinhji invited him on a hunting trip, "Peel blasted eight barrels at a hare, removing its legs, an ear and much else before chasing the remnants of the animal into a neighbouring property, still firing away, until all life was extinguished". Frith believes that Peel had a "perverse" character, exemplified by Lord Hawke's comment that he showed no pleasure at his many successes. Pearson suggests that some of Peel's problems may have been connected to depression, but Frith records that he mellowed in later life.

== Notes and references ==
=== Works cited ===
- Coldham, James (2003) [1990]. Lord Hawke: A Cricketing Legend. London: Tauris Parke Paperbacks. ISBN 1-86064-823-1.
- Frith, David (1994). Stoddy's Mission: The First Great Test Series 1894–1895. Harpenden, Hertfordshire: Queen Anne Press. ISBN 1-85291-561-7.
- Hill, Alan (2000). Hedley Verity. Portrait of a Cricketer. Edinburgh and London: Mainstream Publishing. ISBN 1-84018-302-0.
- Hodgson, Derek (1989). The Official History of Yorkshire County Cricket Club. Ramsbury, Marlborough, Wiltshire: The Crowood Press. ISBN 1-85223-274-9.
- Holmes, Robert Stratten (1904). The History of Yorkshire County Cricket, 1833–1903. Westminster: Archibald Constable. OCLC 27987919.
- Knox, Malcolm (2012). Never a Gentlemen's Game. London: Hardie Grant Books. ISBN 978-1-74270-664-1.
- Pearson, Harry (2010). Slipless in Settle (Ebook). London: Hachette Digital (Little, Brown Book Group). ISBN 978-0-7481-1521-1.
- Pope, Mick (2013). Headingley Ghosts: A Collection of Yorkshire Cricket Tragedies. Leeds: Scratching Shed Publishing. ISBN 978-0-9568043-9-6.
- Thompson, A. A. (1960). Hirst and Rhodes. London: The Sportsmans Book Club. OCLC 644028572.
- Warner, David (2012). The Sweetest Rose: 150 Years of Yorkshire County Cricket Club. Ilkley, Yorkshire: Great Northern. ISBN 978-1-905080-31-1.
- Whimpress, Bernard; Hart, Nigel (1995). Test Eleven: Great Ashes Battles. London: Andre Deutsch. ISBN 0-233-98947-1.
- Woodhouse, Anthony (1989). The History of Yorkshire County Cricket Club. London: Christopher Helm. ISBN 0-7470-3408-7.
- Wynne-Thomas, Peter (1989). The Complete History of Cricket Tours at Home and Abroad. London: Guild Publishing. OCLC 440099345.
