= Billy Trumble =

Australian cricketer

- Trumble in 1886

Personal information
- Full name: John William Trumble
- Born: 16 September 1863; Collingwood, Melbourne, Australia
- Died: 17 August 1944 (aged 80); Brighton, Melbourne, Australia
- Batting: Right-handed
- Bowling: Right-arm offbreak
- Role: All-rounder
- Relatives: Hugh Trumble (brother); Thomas Trumble (brother)

International information
- National side: Australia
- Test debut (cap 39): 1 January 1885 v England
- Last Test: 12 August 1886 v England

Domestic team information
- Years: Team
- 1883-84 to 1889-90: Victoria

Career statistics
| Competition | Tests | First-class |
|---|---|---|
| Matches | 7 | 63 |
| Runs scored | 243 | 1761 |
| Batting average | 20.25 | 18.93 |
| 100s/50s | 0/1 | 0/7 |
| Top score | 59 | 87 |
| Balls bowled | 600 | 7050 |
| Wickets | 10 | 109 |
| Bowling average | 22.19 | 24.10 |
| 5 wickets in innings | 0 | 5 |
| 10 wickets in match | 0 | 1 |
| Best bowling | 3/29 | 6/33 |
| Catches/stumpings | 3/– | 33/– |
- Source: Cricinfo, 24 December 2020

John William Trumble (16 September 1863 – 17 August 1944) was an Australian cricketer who played in seven Tests between 1885 and 1886. He was the older brother of the Test cricketer Hugh Trumble and the senior Australian public servant Thomas Trumble.

== Career ==
Trumble studied law at the University of Melbourne and played cricket for University in the Melbourne senior competition. His participation in the 1886 tour of England meant he had to delay his final examinations by one year. He moved to Nhill in country Victoria in 1888 to practise as a solicitor. He founded the Nhill legal firm of Trumble and Palmer, and remained in Nhill until 1906, when he returned to Melbourne. His cricket career was short as he chose to focus on his legal career.

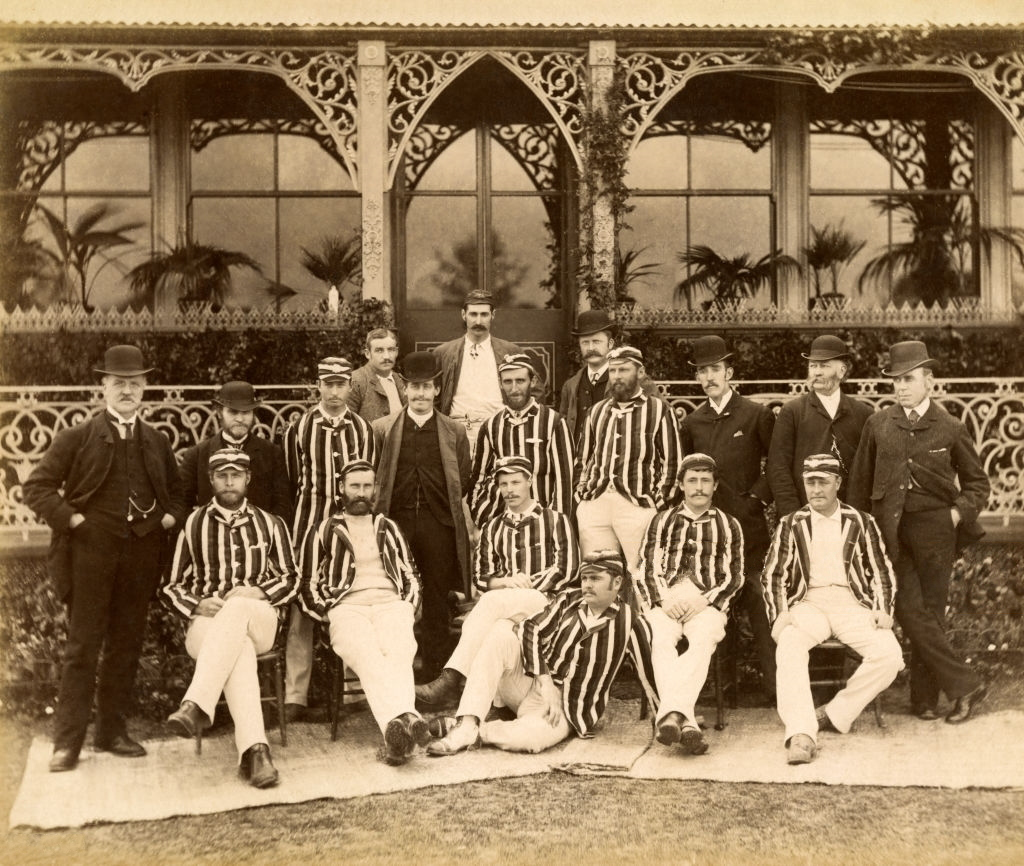
Trumble pictured 3rd right (middle row) with the 1886 Australian team.

While never reaching the lofty standards of his brother Hugh, Billy Trumble was an accurate off-break bowler for Victoria and a sound and patient batsman. He produced some useful performances in his seven Tests for Australia, with a top score of 59 in his first Test, and best figures of 3 for 29 later in the same 1884–85 series. He was fourth among the first-class run-scorers on the tour of England in 1886, with 823 runs at an average of 19.13, and was also one of the leading players on the tour of New Zealand that followed, coming second in the run-scoring with 218 runs at an average of 27.25. In the opening match against Otago he top-scored in each innings with 30 (out of a team total of 60) and 52, to help the Australians to victory after a difficult start.

Trumble's highest first-class score was 87 for Victoria in the victory over New South Wales in 1884–85, which was immediately followed by selection for his Test debut. His best figures were 6 for 33 against New South Wales in 1888–89, when he bowled unchanged to help dismiss New South Wales for 63 when they needed only 76 to win. He was only 26 when he played his last match for Victoria in December 1889.

He played two final first-class matches while on a private visit to England in 1893. In the first of them, he top-scored for C. I. Thornton's XI against Cambridge University with a bright 55 in the second innings.

== Personal life ==
Trumble married Susan Davies in Sydney in January 1889. They had seven children, of whom three sons and three daughters survived him. Susan died in 1938; he died in 1944, aged 80.

== See also ==
- List of Victoria first-class cricketers
