= 1888 English cricket season =

Cricket season review

The 1888 English cricket season was the 25th since the legalisation of overarm bowling. There was a complete contrast to the previous sunlit summer with its record-breaking run-getting: this time the summer was exceptionally cool and wet, resulting in the dominance of bowlers with many records for wicket-taking set.

Australia toured England to compete for the Ashes. It was the 12th test series between the two teams.

After a run of disastrous results over a number of seasons, Derbyshire was demoted from first-class status and first-class county cricket was now played by only eight teams: Gloucestershire, Kent, Lancashire, Middlesex, Notts, Surrey, Sussex and Yorkshire. Derbyshire recovered first-class status in 1894 and rejoined the Championship in 1895. (Note: Some eleven-a-side matches played from 1772 to 1863 have been rated "first-class" by certain sources. However, the term only came into common use around 1864, when overarm bowling was legalised. It was formally defined as a standard by a meeting at Lord's, in May 1894, of Marylebone Cricket Club (MCC) and the county clubs which were then competing in the County Championship. The ruling was effective from the beginning of the 1895 season, but pre-1895 matches of the same standard have no official definition of status because the ruling is not retrospective. Matches of a similar standard since the beginning of the 1864 season are generally considered to have an unofficial first-class status. Pre-1864 matches which are included in the ACS' "Important Match Guide" may generally be regarded as top-class or, at least, historically significant. For further information, see First-class cricket.)

== Honours ==
- Champion County^{[a]} – Surrey
- Wisden (Six Great Bowlers of the Year) – George Lohmann, Johnny Briggs, John Ferris, Charles Turner, Sammy Woods, Bobby Peel

=== Playing record (by county) ===
County	Played	Won	Lost	Drawn	Points^{[b]}
Gloucestershire	14	5	5	4	7.0
Kent	14	7	5	2	8.0
Lancashire	14	4	5	5	6.5
Middlesex	12	4	7	1	4.5
Nottinghamshire	14	3	6	5	5.5
Surrey	14	12	1	1	12.5
Sussex	12	1	9	2	2.0
Yorkshire	14	6	4	4	8.0

== Leading batsmen (qualification 20 innings) ==
1888 English season leading batsmen
Name	Team	Matches	Innings	Not outs	Runs	Highest score	Average	100s	50s
Walter Read	Surrey; England	28	41	2	1414	338	36.25	4	3
WG Grace	Gloucestershire; England	33	59	1	1886	215	32.51	4	7
Bobby Abel	Surrey; England	29	44	2	1323	160	31.50	1	8
Joseph Eccles	Lancashire	16	28	2	660	184	25.38	1	2
Maurice Read	Surrey	23	32	1	786	109	25.35	1	4

== Leading bowlers (qualification 1,000 balls) ==
1888 English season leading bowlers
Name	Team	Balls bowled	Runs conceded	Wickets taken	Average	Best bowling	5 wickets in innings	10 wickets in match
Johnny Briggs	Lancashire; England	5802	1679	160	10.49	9/88	16	4
Alec Hearne	Kent	2750	786	73	10.76	8/30	5	1
Frederick Martin	Kent	3014	791	73	10.83	6/27	4	1
George Lohmann	Surrey; England	6596	2280	209	10.90	8/13	25	9
Jim Phillips	Marylebone Cricket Club (MCC)	1199	393	35	11.22	6/89	5	1

== Ashes tour ==
The sixth Australia team, under the captaincy of Percy McDonnell, toured England in 1888. The great team of 1882 under Billy Murdoch had largely disintegrated, and under McDonnell, the team was largely dependent on the sensational bowling of Turner and Ferris. Their overall record of nineteen victories and fourteen defeats was a minor improvement on the 1886 team, but the absence of Giffen weakened the batting in an exceptionally wet summer, whilst the support bowlers to Turner and Ferris, including the veteran Harry Boyle, were used so little that they could never get into form. When the weather improved after a dreadful mid-summer, the batting was much too poor to compete with England and the team's results deteriorated with thrashings in the last two Test matches and poor results against the counties.

Thanks mainly to the bowling of Bobby Peel, well supported by Lohmann, Briggs and Barnes, England defeated Australia two tests to one to retain the Ashes.

Cumulative record - Test wins	1876–1888
England	16
Australia	10
Drawn	4

== Notable events ==
- Following the demotion of Derbyshire, the remaining eight counties arrange a nearly-complete program of home-and-away matches (except for Middlesex not playing Sussex) which paves the way for the first County Championship in 1890.
- 5 July – Formation of Glamorgan County Cricket Club took place at a meeting in the Angel Hotel, Cardiff.
- 11 August – Surrey beats Sussex by an innings and 485 runs, which remains the most one-sided match in county cricket history. Surrey's score of 698 broke their own 1883 record of 650 as the highest innings total in county cricket.
- 23 August – Charles Turner takes his 215th wicket, beating Ted Peate's 1882 record for most wickets in a season. Turner would finish with 283, a total beaten only by Tich Freeman in 1928 and 1933 and Tom Richardson in 1895.
- Surrey's feat of winning twelve of its fourteen games is a winning percentage that has not been equalled since in county cricket, with the best since being fourteen wins in seventeen matches by Warwickshire in 1995.
- John Wisden’s Cricketers' Almanack publishes its first “Cricketers of the Year” for this season.

== Labels ==
^{a} An unofficial seasonal title sometimes proclaimed by consensus of media and historians prior to December 1889 when the official County Championship was constituted. Although there are ante-dated claims prior to 1873, when residence qualifications were introduced, it is only since that ruling that any quasi-official status can be ascribed.
^{b} Between 1887 and 1889 an unofficial point system of 1 point for a win and 0.5 points for a draw, devised by the "Cricket Reporting Agency", was used to determine the unofficial "Champion County"

== Bibliography ==
- ACS (1981). A Guide to Important Cricket Matches Played in the British Isles 1709–1863. Nottingham: ACS. OCLC 85045528.
- ACS (1982). A Guide to First-class Cricket Matches Played in the British Isles. Nottingham: ACS. OCLC 10586869.
- Warner, Pelham (1946). Lords: 1787–1945. London: Harrap. OCLC 877106024.

== Annual reviews ==
- James Lillywhite's Cricketers' Annual (Red Lilly), Lillywhite, 1889
- Wisden Cricketers' Almanack, 1889
