= List of Surrey County Cricket Club grounds =

Surrey County Cricket Club was established on 22 August 1845; prior to that an informal county team had existed before, and had occasionally appeared in first-class cricket, occasionally playing in the early part of the nineteenth century as Epsom or Godalming. It has since played first-class cricket from 1846, List A cricket from 1963 and Twenty20 cricket from 2003, using a number of home grounds during that time. The Oval in Kennington has played host to the club's first home fixtures in all three formats of the game; in first-class cricket in 1846 against the Marylebone Cricket Club; in List A cricket in 1964 against Gloucestershire; and in Twenty20 cricket against Middlesex in 2003. Surrey have played home matches at fourteen grounds, but have played the majority of their home fixtures at The Oval, which also holds Test, One Day International and Twenty20 International cricket matches.

The fourteen grounds that Surrey have used for home matches since its formation are listed below, with statistics complete through to the end of the 2014 season.

== Grounds ==
Below is a complete list of grounds used by Surrey County Cricket Club in first-class, List A and Twenty20 matches. "Last" and "Matches" columns data are as of September 2018. The Matches totals are for all sides that have played on the ground, but exclude those games that were scheduled but in which there was no play.

Name	Location	First	Last	Matches	First	Last	Matches	First	Last	Matches	Refs
Name	Location	First-class			List A			Twenty20			Refs
The Oval	Kennington	25 June 1846 v Marylebone Cricket Club	24 September 2018 v Essex	2,099	27 May 1964 v Gloucestershire	6 June 2018 v Glamorgan	489	13 June 2003 v Middlesex	15 August 2018 v Hampshire	111	(Note: Only the first-class, List A and Twenty20 matches played by Surrey at the ground after 1845 are recorded in the table, except that the Matches total includes matches played by all teams on the ground.)
Broadwater Park	Farncombe	only match: 24 August 1854 v Nottinghamshire		1	–	–	0	–	–	0	
Park Lane	Reigate	only match: 21 June 1909 v Oxford University		1	–	–	0	–	–	0	(Note: HDG Leveson-Gower's XI played four first-class matches here between 1924–1936. Only the first-class match played by Surrey at the ground is recorded in the table.)
Woodbridge Road	Guildford	13 July 1938 v Hampshire	20 June 2018 v Somerset	97	24 May 1970 v Gloucestershire	14 June 2016 v Sussex	41	–	–	0	(Note: Oxford University played a single first-class match here against the touring Sri Lankans in 1979. Only the first-class matches played by Surrey at the ground are recorded in the table, except that the Matches total includes matches played by all teams on the ground. The Surrey Cricket Board played a single List A match here as the home team in the 2001 Cheltenham & Gloucester Trophy against Surrey. Only the List A matches played by Surrey at the ground as the home team are recorded in the table, except that the Matches total includes matches played by all teams on the ground.)
Hawker's Sports Ground	Kingston-upon-Thames	31 August 1946 v Hampshire	4 September 1946 v Combined Services	2	–	–	0	–	–	0	(Note: Fourteen first-class matches were played here by teams beside Surrey, including six North v South fixtures. Only the first-class matches played by Surrey at the ground are recorded in the table.)
Cheam Road	Sutton	–	–	0	only match: 12 July 1969 v Derbyshire		1	–	–	0	
St John's School Ground	Leatherhead	–	–	0	13 August 1969 v Northamptonshire	14 May 1972 v Worcestershire	2	–	–	0	
British Aerospace Company Ground	Byfleet	–	–	0	12 July 1970 v Warwickshire	22 July 1979 v Warwickshire	10	–	–	0	
Charterhouse School Ground	Godalming	–	–	0	only match: 28 May 1972 v Warwickshire		1	–	–	0	
Kenton Court Meadow	Sunbury-on-Thames	–	–	0	11 June 1972 v Gloucestershire	23 June 1974 v Leicestershire	3	–	–	0	
Decca Sports Ground	Tolworth	–	–	0	only match: 20 May 1973 v Northamptonshire		1	–	–	0	
Imber Court	East Molesey	–	–	0	only match: 26 June 1983 v Northamptonshire		1	14 June 2003 v Essex	16 June 2003 v Sussex	2	
Recreation Ground	Banstead	only match: 27 June 1984 v Cambridge University		1	–	–	0	–	–	0	
Whitgift School Ground	Croydon	13 August 2003 v Nottinghamshire	18 May 2011 v Essex	9	9 August 2000 v Warwickshire	22 May 2011 v Hampshire	13	only match: 14 July 2011 v Sussex		1	(Note: India A and West Indies A played one first-class match at the ground in 2010. Only the first-class matches played by Surrey at the ground are recorded in the table, except that the Matches total includes matches played by all teams on the ground.)
