= Westwell War Memorial =

War memorial in Westwell, Oxfordshire, England

Coordinates: 51°47′17″N 1°40′37″W

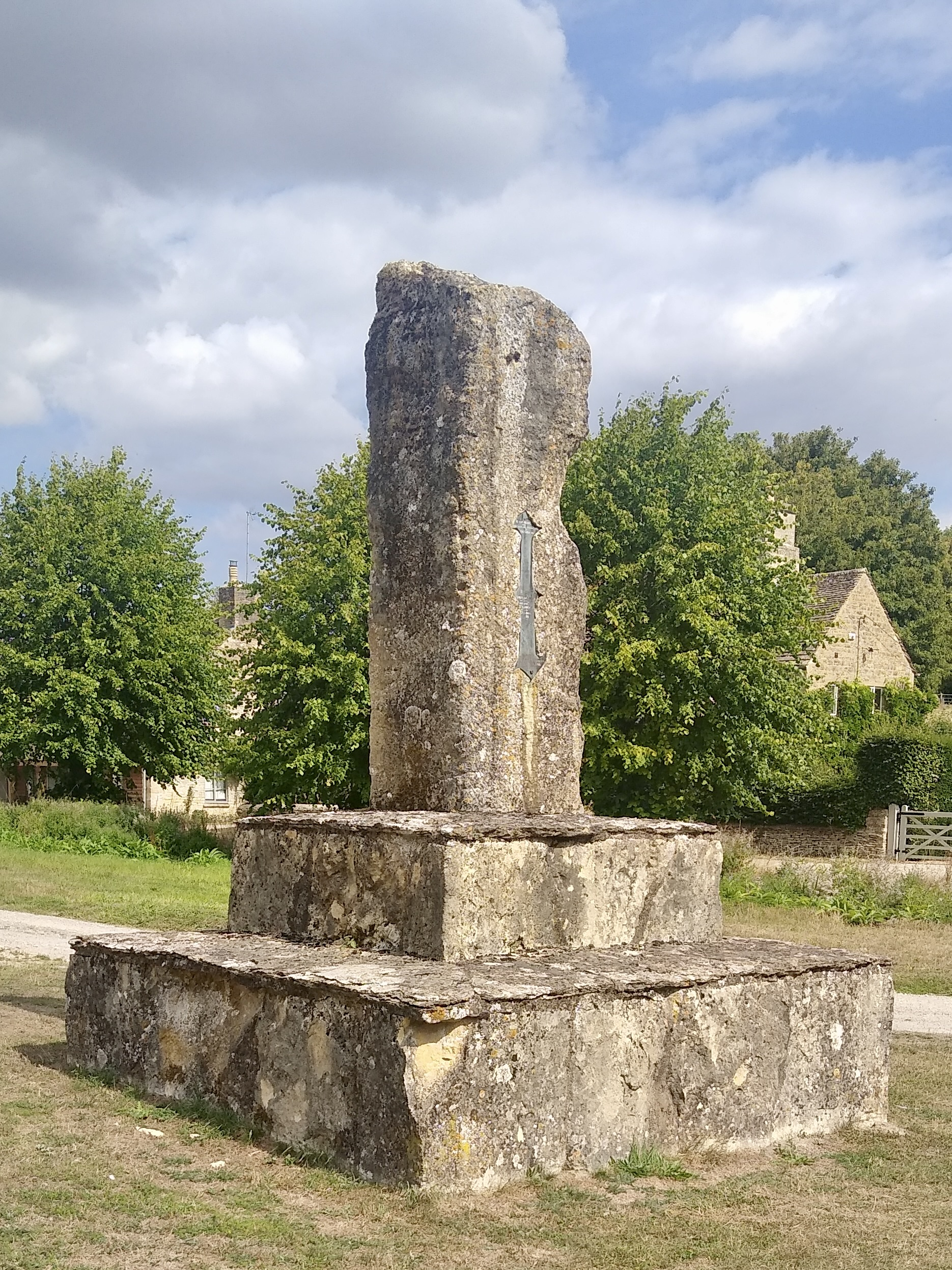
Memorial in 2025

The Westwell War Memorial is a memorial to the Price brothers erected in the hamlet of Westwell, Oxfordshire after the First World War. The limestone monument includes a Gothic brass numeral "1" salvaged from the clock of the Cloth Hall, Ypres. The memorial became a Grade II listed building in 1955.

The memorial stands on a triangle of grass beside a pond on the main road through the hamlet, a few miles south of Burford in West Oxfordshire, and close to the county border with Gloucestershire. It commemorates Second Lieutenant Harold Strachan Price (1881–1915) and his brother Lieutenant Edward John (Jack) Price (1890–1918). Harold served in the 3rd Battalion Royal Fusiliers, and was killed near Bellewaarde Ridge on 24 May 1915 during the Second Battle of Ypres. His body was never recovered, and his name is listed on the Menin Gate at Ypres.

Jack served in the Royal Navy, in the submarine HMS E15. His vessel was run aground at Kephez Point in the Dardanelles on 17 April 1915 during the Gallipoli campaign, and he was captured by the Ottomans. He died of Spanish flu on 16 October 1918, while he was held at a prisoner of war camp at Yozgat in central Anatolia. Initially buried at Yozgat, his remains were later moved and reburied at the Baghdad (North Gate) War Cemetery in Iraq.

The memorial was built by the brothers' sister, Stretta Aimee (Bunney) Holland (née Price), wife of Sir Reginald Holland, who lived at Westwell Manor, about 100 m (330 ft) to the south. They were the children of the Canadian lumber merchant Edward George Price and his wife Henrietta Keane Price, of 1 Craven Hill, Hyde Park, London and Broadwater, near Godalming, Surrey (now the location of Broadwater Park and Broadwater School).

It comprises a standing limestone monolith on a limestone base with two deep steps. The roughly-formed standing stone, arranged upright like the stump of a cross, comes from quarry at Heythrop Park. The base is made of Headington stone from Brasenose Quarry in Headington.

A Gothic brass numeral "1" is attached to the front face of the monolith. The numeral come from the clock of the Cloth Hall, Ypres: Harold Price found it in the ruins of the building after the First Battle of Ypres. The numeral bears three inscriptions in white lettering: at the top, "TO THE BRAVE / WHO / GAVE THEIR LIVES FOR ENGLAND / IN / THE GREAT WAR"; at the centre, a dedication "ERECTED BY / STRETTA AIMEE HOLLAND / IN MEMORY OF / HER BROTHERS / LT HAROLD S PRICE / ROYAL FUSILIERS / LT EDD JOHN PRICE / RN"; and at the bottom, "THIS BRASS NUMERAL / FORMED PART OF THE CLOCK / OF THE CLOTH HALL / AT YPRES".

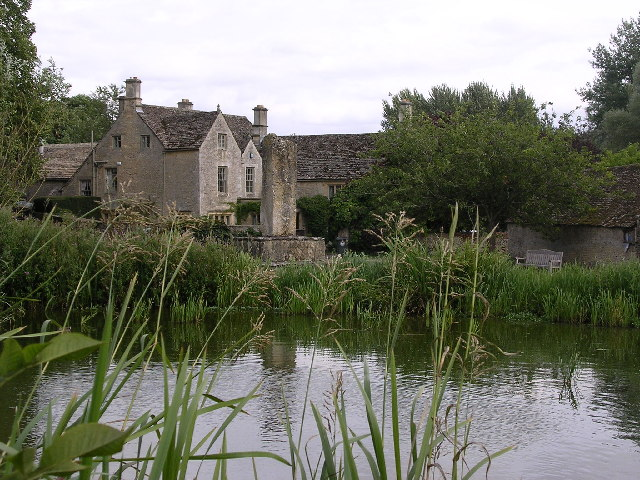
Memorial beside the pond, in 2003

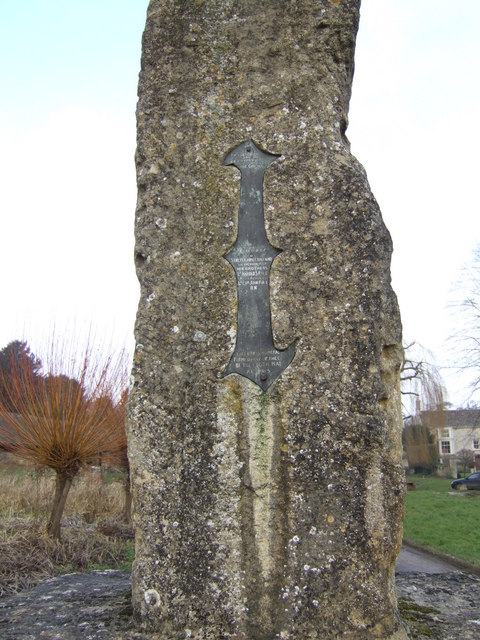
Brass numeral with inscriptions, in 2007
