= Frederick Pooley =

English cricketer (1852–1905)

Frederick William Pooley (7 April 1852 – 11 September 1905) was an English first-class cricketer active 1876–78 who played for Surrey. The brother of Ted Pooley, he was born in Richmond-upon-Thames; died in West Ham.
