= Reigate Priory Cricket Club Ground =

Cricket ground in Reigate, Surrey, England

Coordinates: 51.23769°N 0.21235°W

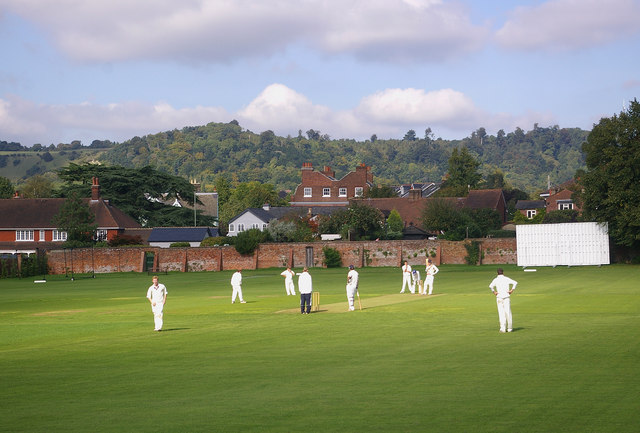
- Interactive map of Reigate Priory Cricket Club Ground

Ground information
- Location: Reigate, Surrey
- Country: England
- Establishment: 1853 (first recorded match)

Team information
Surrey	(1909)
HDG Leveson-Gower's XI	(1924 & 1934-1936)
- As of 29 August 2010; Source: Ground profile

Reigate Priory Cricket Club Ground is a cricket ground in Reigate, Surrey.

== History ==
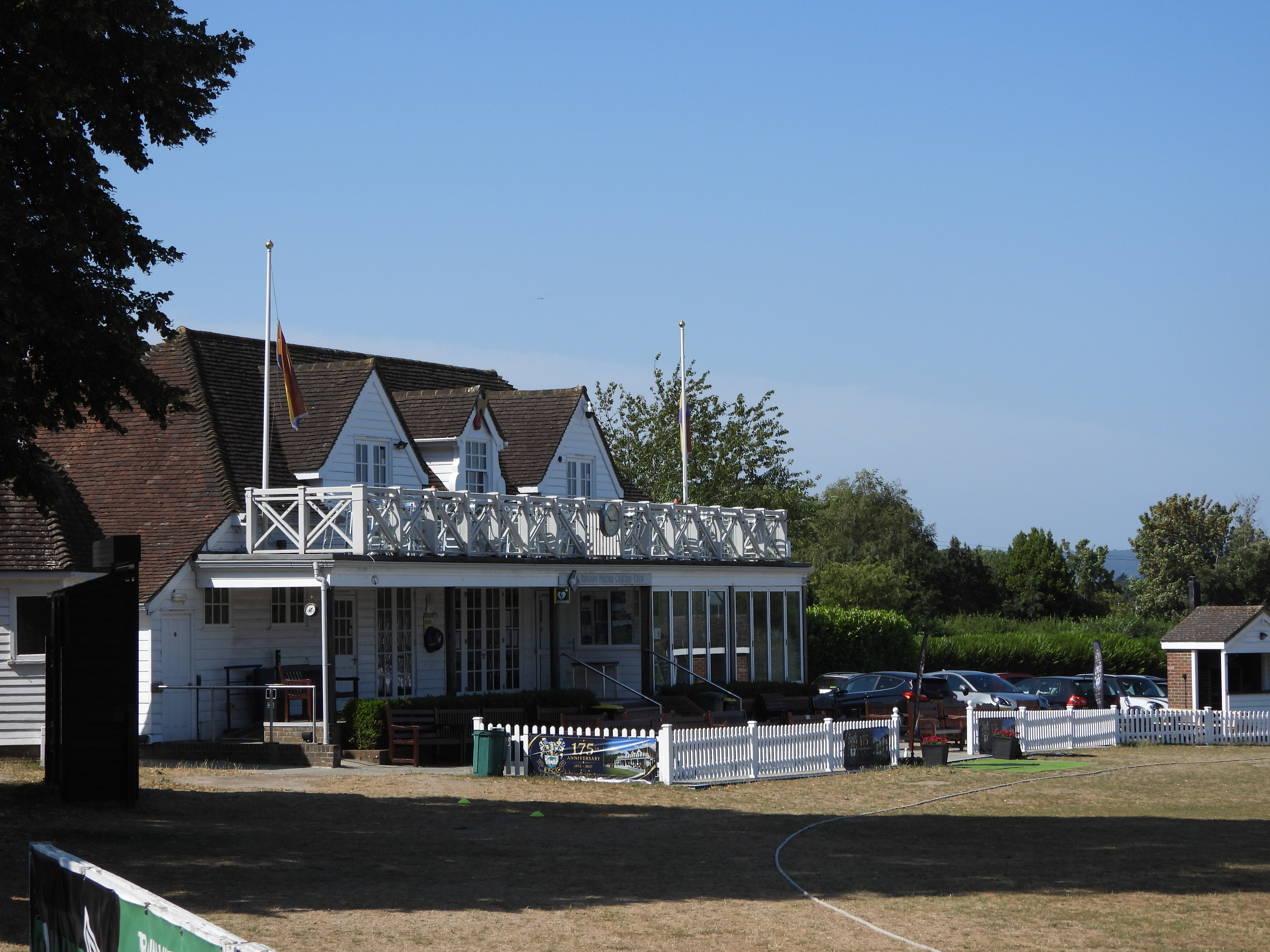
The pavilion

The first recorded match on the ground was in 1853 when East Surrey played West Sussex. It hosted its first first-class match in 1909 when Surrey played Oxford University. The next first-class match came in 1924 when HDG Leveson-Gower's XI played the touring South Africans. HDG Leveson-Gower's XI returned to the Priory to play first-class matches in 1934, where they played 3 further matches from 1934 to 1936, playing their final first-class match there against Oxford University.

Additionally, during a number of periods in the 20th and early 21st century, the ground played host to a number of Surrey Second XI matches in the Minor Counties Championship, Second XI Championship and Second XI Trophy, hosting a combined total of 13 Second XI matches.

In local domestic cricket, Reigate Priory is the home venue of Reigate Priory Cricket Club who play in the Surrey Championship Premier Division. During World War II the ground was damaged in The Blitz.

Reigate Priory Cricket club has also fielded many famous names over the years like W. G. Grace, Zubin Bharucha and Jason Roy.

== Use for football ==
The ground has been the traditional home of Reigate Priory F.C. since its foundation in 1870, and the club's reserve and junior sides still play there.
