= British Aerospace Company Ground =

Former cricket ground in Byfleet, Surrey, England

Coordinates: 51.34278°N 0.48435°W

Ground information
- Location: Byfleet, Surrey
- Establishment: Between 1914 and 1918
- Capacity: 5,000

Team information
| Surrey | (1970-1979) |
- As of 29 August 2010; Source: Ground profile

British Aerospace Company Ground was a cricket ground in Byfleet, Surrey. The ground was built as a works venue for the Vickers-Armstrongs factory in Brooklands. In 1920 a factory side was established, although the first recorded match on the ground was in 1970 when Surrey played Warwickshire in what was the ground's first List-A match. From 1970 to 1979, the ground played host to 10 List-A matches, the last of which was between Surrey and Warwickshire in the 1979 John Player League.

The ground also hosted 7 Surrey Second XI matches in the Second XI Championship between 1970 and 1978.

1979 was to be the final year in which the ground was used, with the M25 motorway being constructed through it.
