= Ted Pooley =

English cricketer

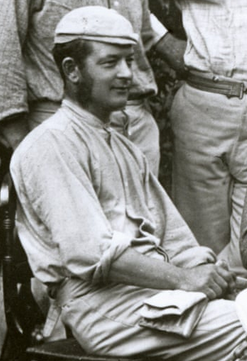
- Pooley in 1876

Personal information
- Born: 13 February 1842; Chepstow, Monmouthshire
- Died: 18 July 1907 (aged 65); Lambeth, London, England
- Batting: Right-handed
- Bowling: Right-arm slow
- Role: Wicket-keeper

Career statistics
Competition	First-class
Matches	370
Runs scored	9,345
Batting average	15.86
100s/50s	1/32
Top score	125
Balls bowled	627
Wickets	6
Bowling average	65.00
5 wickets in innings	0
10 wickets in match	0
Best bowling	2/39
Catches/stumpings	496/358
- Source: CricketArchive, 14 April 2023

Edward William Pooley (13 February 1842 – 18 July 1907) was an English cricketer who played first-class cricket for Surrey and Middlesex between 1861 and 1883. In 1877, he was supposed to be England's wicket-keeper in what would be the first Test match played; however, Pooley had been arrested in New Zealand and was unable to make the journey to Australia with his teammates.

== The first Test gambling scandal ==
In 1877, a representative England side was touring New Zealand and then Australia. Every match was an occasion for gambling by supporters of both sides and most games had a prize purse to play for. Pooley was injured and travelled ahead of the team to recuperate before a match in Christchurch, New Zealand. Another visitor, Ralph Donkin, offered odds of 20–1 to anyone who guessed the exact score of a batsman. The game was to be an Odds match where the England XI would play 22 of Christchurch and Pooley simply put a shilling on each batsman to make 0. He stood to make a pound for each duck scored for an initial stake of 22 shillings (£1.10). He also apparently umpired during the match. After the match – which featured 11 scores of 0 – Pooley claimed £9 15s from Donkin who refused to pay. It was Pooley's alleged assault on Donkin that led to his arrest at Dunedin (after another match in which Pooley played). He was sent for trial at Christchurch, just before the England team left for Australia and what would subsequently be recognised as the first Test match. Eventually he was found not guilty (along with the England team's bag man Alfred Bramhall) and returned to England several weeks after his fellow tourists. The story goes that the people of Christchurch held a public subscription and bought him a pocket watch.

It was not the first time he had been in trouble with authority figures. He was well known as a drinker and a gambler. In 1873, he had been suspended by Surrey for taking a bet on a match he was playing in.

== Sporting career ==
All this detracts from his long and successful career as a professional cricketer. By his own account he first kept wicket during a match in 1863 when the regular keeper refused to play on a bad pitch (Middlesex had been dismissed for 20). He was an instant success and kept wicket for Middlesex and Surrey for the next 20 years. Wicket-keeping was very different in the nineteenth century. Most keepers stood up to all but the fastest bowlers with a fielder behind them at long-stop to tidy up any byes. Pooley often used his bare hands to catch the ball. At one point he used a bare hand and one soft glove.

His 1870 season was sufficiently good that it merited its own article in Wisden. The article noted that: "Pooley (whose hands were in a painfully battered state at one period of the season) stumped 18 and caught out 34 in the Surrey matches of 1870; of those 52 wickets, 13 were stumped and 18 caught from Southerton's bowling. In the Gloucestershire match on Durdham Down Pooley had 5 wickets. In one of the Middlesex matches he also had 5. In the Kent match at Mote Park he had 6 wickets, and in the Yorkshire match on the Oval he had 7, accomplishing in that match the great wicket-keeping feat of taking 6 wickets in one innings". In that 1870 season he also topped the Surrey batting averages, with 771 runs at an average of 24.27, and a high score of 94 against Middlesex at the Oval, putting on 105 for the 4th wicket with Griffith in an innings of which Wisden noted "his hitting was brilliant".

According to David Frith in The Fast Men, at an unspecified date, probably before 1871, Jem Mace, the boxer, was watching cricket at Lords when a ball hit a crack in the pitch and took out three of wicket-keeper Ted Pooley's teeth. He dressed Pooley's wounds and declared: "I would rather stand up against any man in England for an hour than take your place behind the wicket for five minutes. I heard that ball strike you as if it had hit a brick wall."

In 1871, he broke a finger taking a return from a fielder and the bone protruded from his flesh. His batting, which was very promising in his early years was increasingly hampered by injuries to his hands.

On 21 August 1878, against Kent at Oval, Pooley made his eighth stumping of the match, then a record in first-class cricket. His wicket-keeping was fundamental to the success of spin bowlers like James Southerton. Off-spin and orthodox left-arm spin were recent developments following the legalisation of overarm bowling in 1864 and were a puzzle for keepers as well as batsmen.

Including catches made when not keeping wicket, he finished with 854 dismissals in first-class matches.

== Retirement ==
After his cricket career, Pooley, as with so many of his contemporary cricketers, struggled financially and his gambling and drinking eventually led to the Lambeth workhouse. In 1899 the writer Alfred Pullin traced and interviewed many old cricketers. He described Pooley's hands as "mere lumps of deformity" and attributed their condition to rheumatism caused by drink. Pooley became angry at this, banging the table to show he had no feeling in his fingers and that it was cricket rather than "rheumatics" that had put him in the workhouse. He took Pullin outside to show he could still catch a ball. Pooley lived on until 1907, dying in poverty, while his teammates from the 1877 tour were lauded as the first Test cricketers.

His brother, Frederick Pooley, also played first-class cricket.
