= Cheam Road =

Cricket ground in Sutton, London, England

Coordinates: 51.36078°N 0.20430°W

Cheam Sports Ground
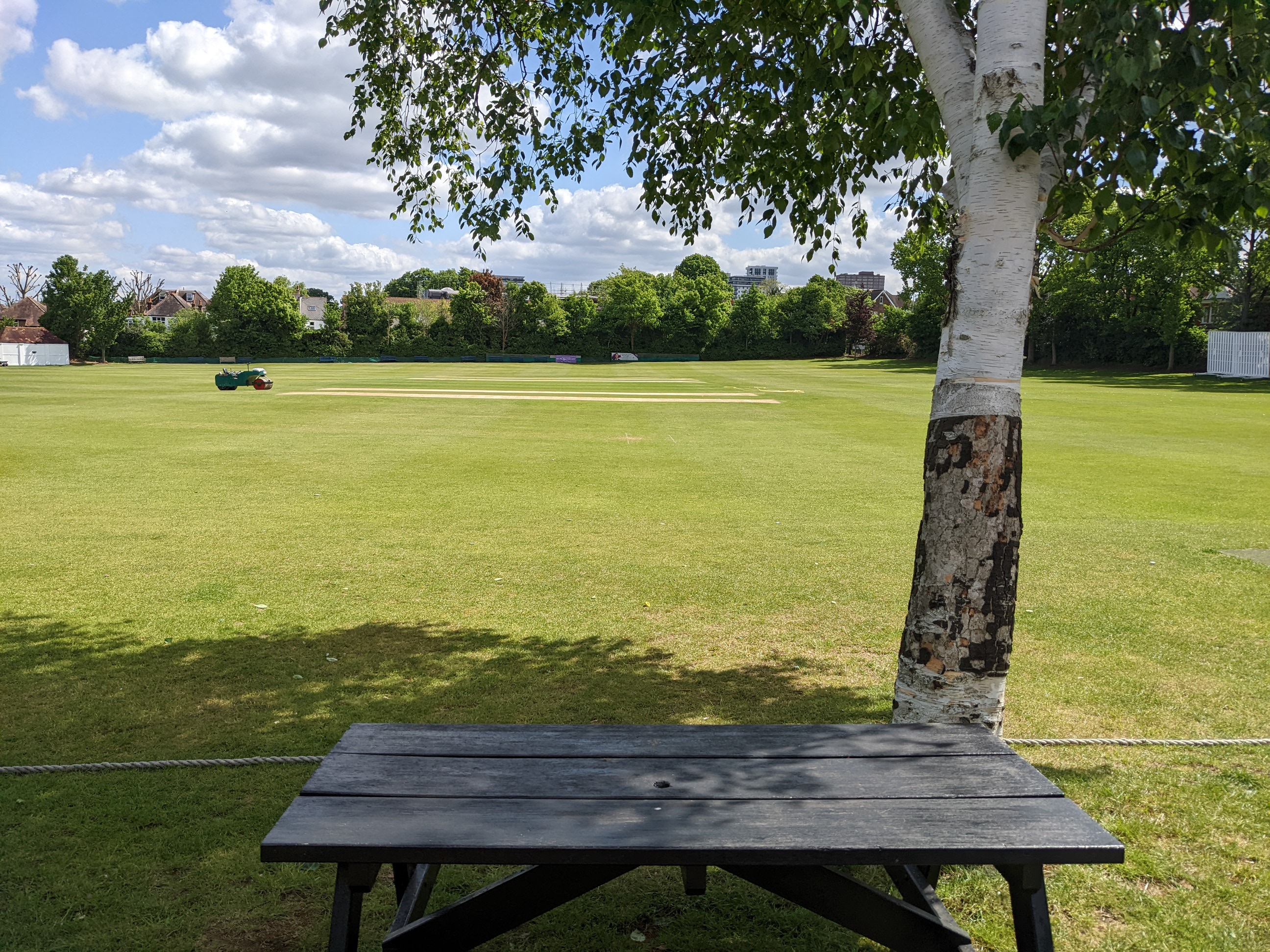

Ground information
- Location: Sutton, London
- Establishment: 1858

Team information
Surrey	(1969)
- As of 29 August 2010; Source: Ground profile

Cheam Road is a cricket ground in Sutton, London (formerly Surrey). The first recorded match on the ground was in 1940, when Sutton United Tramps played London Counties.

The ground held a single match in the 1955 Minor Counties Championship when the Surrey Second XI played the Warwickshire Second XI. More recently, the ground has held Surrey Second XI matches in the Second XI Championship and the Second XI Trophy.

Surrey played a single List-A match against Derbyshire at Cheam Road in the 1969 Player's County League.

In local domestic cricket, Cheam Road is the home ground of Sutton Cricket Club who play in the Surrey Premier League. Historically the cricket ground was part of the Lower Cheam House Estate and was donated to the cricket club. Having gone without a pavilion since 1858, the club bought the old waiting room at Sutton railway station and installed it at the ground. In 1906 a wooden pavilion was built, but this was destroyed during The Blitz. A replacement pavilion was constructed in 1955.
