= Kenton Court Meadow =

Cricket ground in England

Coordinates: 51.413°N 0.391°W

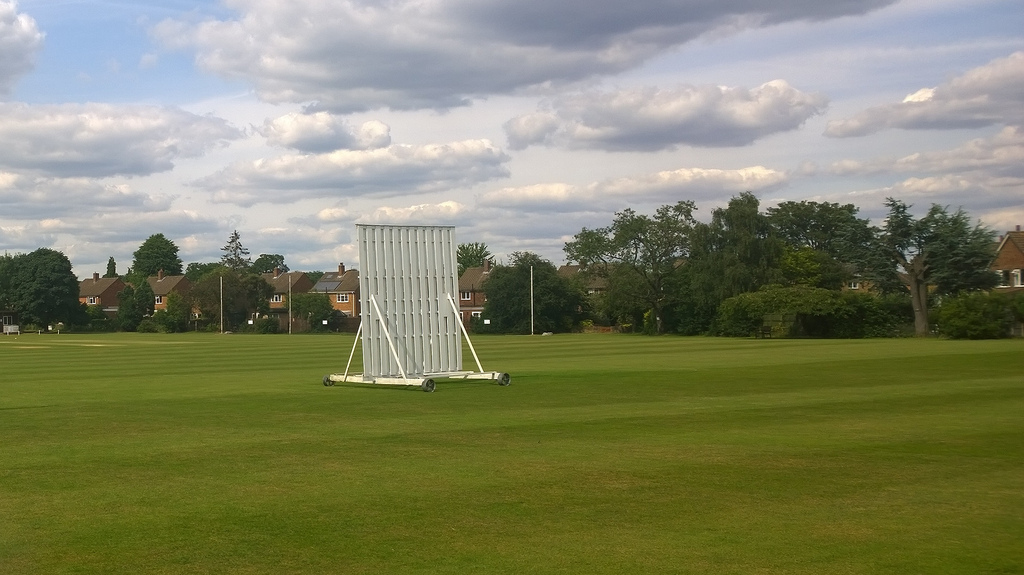

Ground information
- Location: Sunbury-on-Thames, Surrey
- Establishment: 1957

Team information
Surrey	(1972-1974)
- As of 2 September 2010; Source: profile

Kenton Court Meadow is a cricket ground in Sunbury-on-Thames, Surrey (formerly Middlesex). First established in 1957, the first recorded match on the ground was in 1967, when Sunbury played South Hampstead.

In 1972, the ground held its first List-A match when Surrey played Gloucestershire in the 1972 John Player League. The following season Surrey played Warwickshire in the same competition, and in 1974 the ground held its final List-A match when Surrey played Leicestershire in the 1974 version of the competition.

Between 1974 and 1977, the Surrey Second XI played 4 Second XI Championship matches at the ground.

In local domestic cricket, the venue is the home ground of Sunbury Cricket Club whose top men's side play in the Surrey Premier League being 50 yards north of old Surrey on which the league is approximately based. The cricket pavilion at the ground was opened in 1959 by Sir Leonard Hutton.
