= Decca Sports Ground =

Cricket ground in Tolworth, London, England

Coordinates: 51.37723°N 0.27659°W

Ground information
- Location: Tolworth, London
- Establishment: 1973 (first recorded match)

Team information
Surrey	(1973)
- As of 29 August 2010; Source: Ground profile

Decca Sports Ground is a cricket ground in Tolworth, London (formerly Surrey). The first recorded professional match on the ground was in 1973, when Surrey played Northamptonshire in a List-A match in the 1973 John Player League as Surrey used a few one-off grounds from 1972 to 1974.

Decca sports club disbanded on the collapse of Decca Radar. The company's rugby union team Racal Decca RFC of Tolworth continues and uses this ground once a year.
