= Metropolitan Police Sports Club Ground, East Molesey =

Cricket ground in Surrey, England

Coordinates: 51.38882°N 0.35255°W

Metropolitan Police Sports Club Ground
- Imber Court

Ground information
- Location: East Molesey, Surrey
- Establishment: 1940 (first recorded match)
- End names
- Football Ground End; Tennis Courts End

Team information
Surrey	(1983)
- As of 29 August 2010; Source: Ground profile

Metropolitan Police Sports Club Ground (also known as Imber Court) is a cricket ground in East Molesey, Surrey. The first recorded match on the ground was in 1940, when the Metropolitan Police played a British Empire XI.

In 1983, Surrey played a single List A match at the ground against Northamptonshire.

In 2003, Surrey returned to use the ground for two Twenty20 matches in the Twenty20 Cup, played against Essex and Sussex.

Being based at a police training college, the ground is used by a number of police teams. A well maintained ground, the cricket pavilion was constructed in 1983.

== Other Metropolitan Police Sports Club Grounds ==
The Metropolitan Police have other sports clubs at Bushey, Chigwell, and Hayes.
