= West Sussex Invitation Cricket League =

The West Sussex Invitation Cricket League is a cricket competition in West Sussex, England. It was created by the merger of the West Sussex Cricket League and the Sussex Invitation Cricket League. It is one of two feeder leagues to the Sussex Cricket League, the other being the East Sussex Cricket League.

== Organization ==
The League is divided into 9 divisions of 9 teams and 1 division of 14 teams. The large size of the bottom division is due to the winding up of division 11 for the 2013 season. The League also hosts a Sunday Twenty20 competition which runs for much of the season

== Divisions ==
=== 2014 ===
Division 1	Division 2	Division 3	Division 4	Division 5
Arundel CC 1st XI	Selsey CC - 1st XI	Southwick CC, Sussex - 1st XI	Arundel CC - 2nd XI	Littlehampton, Clapham & Patching CC - 2nd XI
Felbridge & Sunnyside CC 1st XI	Horsham Trinity CC - 1st XI	Aldwick CC - 1st XI	Findon CC - 3rd XI	Dome Mission CC - 1st XI
Southwater CC - 1st XI	Broadbridge Heath CC - 1st XI	Crawley Nayee CC - 1st XI	Partridge Green CC - 1st XI	Horsham Trinity CC - 2nd XI
West Chiltington & Thakeham CC - 1st XI	Crawley Eagles CC - CECC 3rd XI	Eastergate CC - 1st XI	Southwater CC - 2nd XI	Lancing Manor CC - 1st XI
Clymping CC - 1st XI	Broadwater CC - 1st XI	Clayton & Belgrave Adelaide CC - 1st XI	Felbridge & Sunnyside CC - 2nd XI	Ram CC - 2nd XI
Littlehampton, Clapham & Patching CC - 1st XI	Storrington CC - 1st XI	Barns Green CC - 1st XI	Horsham CC - 3rd XI	Ifield CC - 3rd XI
East Preston CC - 1st XI	Scaynes Hill CC - 1st XI	Worthing CC - 3rd XI	West Wittering CC - 1st XI	Rustington CC - 1st XI
St Andrews (Burgess Hill) CC - 1st XI	Three Bridges CC - 3rd XI	Brighton & Hove CC - 3rd XI	West Chiltington & Thakeham CC - 2nd XI	Crawley Eagles CC - CECC 4th XI
Ram CC - 1st XI	Chippingdale CC - 1st XI	Himani CC - 1st XI	St Matthias CC - 1st XI	Scaynes Hill CC - 2nd XI

Division 6	Division 7	Division 8	Division 9	Division 10
Chichester Priory Park CC - 3rd XI	Aldwick CC - 2nd XI	St Andrews (Burgess Hill) CC - 3rd XI	Chichester Priory Park CC - 4th XI	Ifield CC - 4th XI
Steyning CC - 3rd XI	Storrington CC - 2nd XI	Worthing CC - 4th XI	Selsey CC - 2nd XI	Horsham CC - 4th XI
Three Bridges CC - 4th XI	Brighton Electricity CC - 1st XI	Portslade CC - 3rd XI	Clymping CC - 2nd XI	Portslade CC - 4th XI
Chippingdale CC - 2nd XI	Broadbridge Heath CC - 2nd XI	Broadwater CC - 2nd XI	Littlehampton, Clapham & Patching CC - 3rd XI	Scaynes Hill CC - 3rd XI
East Preston CC - 2nd XI	Goring By Sea CC - 3rd XI	Horsham Trinity CC - 3rd XI	Three Bridges CC - 5th XI	Lancing Manor CC - 2nd XI
Eastergate CC - 2nd XI	Warnham CC - League 1st XI	Arundel CC - 3rd XI	Billingshurst CC - 3rd XI	Pulborough CC - League 3rd XI
R.M.U CC - 1st XI	Brighton & Hove CC - 4th XI	West Chiltington & Thakeham CC - 3rd XI	Middleton CC, Sussex - Academy XI	Goring By Sea CC - 4th XI
St Andrews (Burgess Hill) CC - 2nd XI	Barns Green CC - 2nd XI	Felbridge & Sunnyside CC - 3rd XI	West Wittering CC - 2nd XI	Horsham Trinity CC - 4th XI
PC UK CC - 1st XI	Rustington CC - 2nd XI	Henfield CC - 3rd XI	Ram CC - 3rd XI	Felbridge & Sunnyside CC - 4th XI
				Chippingdale CC - 3rd XI
				Brighton & Hove CC - 5th XI
				Ram CC - 4th XI
				Southwick CC, Sussex - 2nd XI
				St Andrews (Burgess Hill) CC - 4th XI
