= Broadwater Park =

Cricket ground in Farncombe, Surrey, England

Coordinates: 51.19824°N 0.59978°W

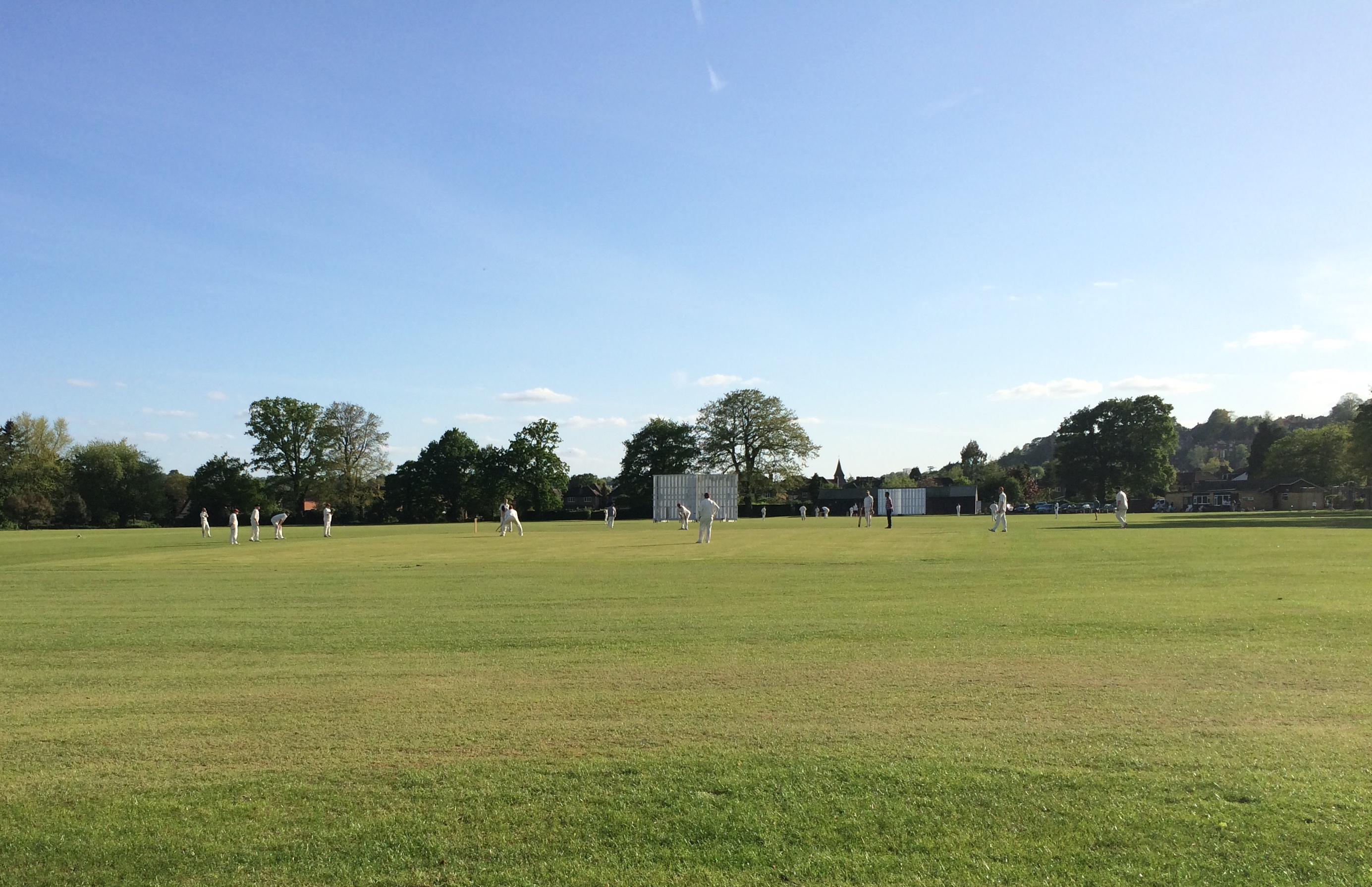
- Interactive map of Broadwater Park

Ground information
- Location: Farncombe, Surrey
- Country: England
- Establishment: 1827 (first recorded match)

Team information
Surrey	(1854)
- As of 29 August 2010; Source: Ground profile

Broadwater Park is a cricket ground during the summer, and football ground through winter, located in Farncombe, Surrey.

The first recorded match on the ground was in 1827, when the ground hosted a match between East and West Sussex. The ground held a single first-class match in 1854 when Surrey played Nottinghamshire. In constant use throughout both the 19th and 20th centuries, the ground today is the home venue of Farncombe Cricket Club. and Farncombe Wanderers Cricket Club.

The Broadwater parkrun, a five-kilometre organised run/jog/walk, takes place every Saturday at 9 am in the park.

The lake, at the east edge of the park, is leased by Godalming Angling Society.
