= Surrey County Cricket Club =

English cricket club

- Nickname: Brown Caps
- One Day name: Surrey

Personnel
- Captain: Rory Burns
- One Day captain: Rory Burns (LA); Sam Curran (T20)
- Coach: TBA
- Chief executive: Steve Elworthy

Team information
- Colours: First-class: List A and T20:
- Founded: 1845; 181 years ago
- Home ground: The Oval, Kennington, London
- Capacity: 25,500

History
- First-class debut: MCC in 1846 at The Oval
- Championship wins: 22 outright and 1 shared
- Second Division Championship wins: 2
- CB40/Pro40/Sunday League wins: 3
- FP Trophy/NatWest Trophy wins: 1
- Twenty20 Cup wins: 1
- Benson & Hedges Cup wins: 3
- Official website: www.kiaoval.com
First-class
T20
One Day

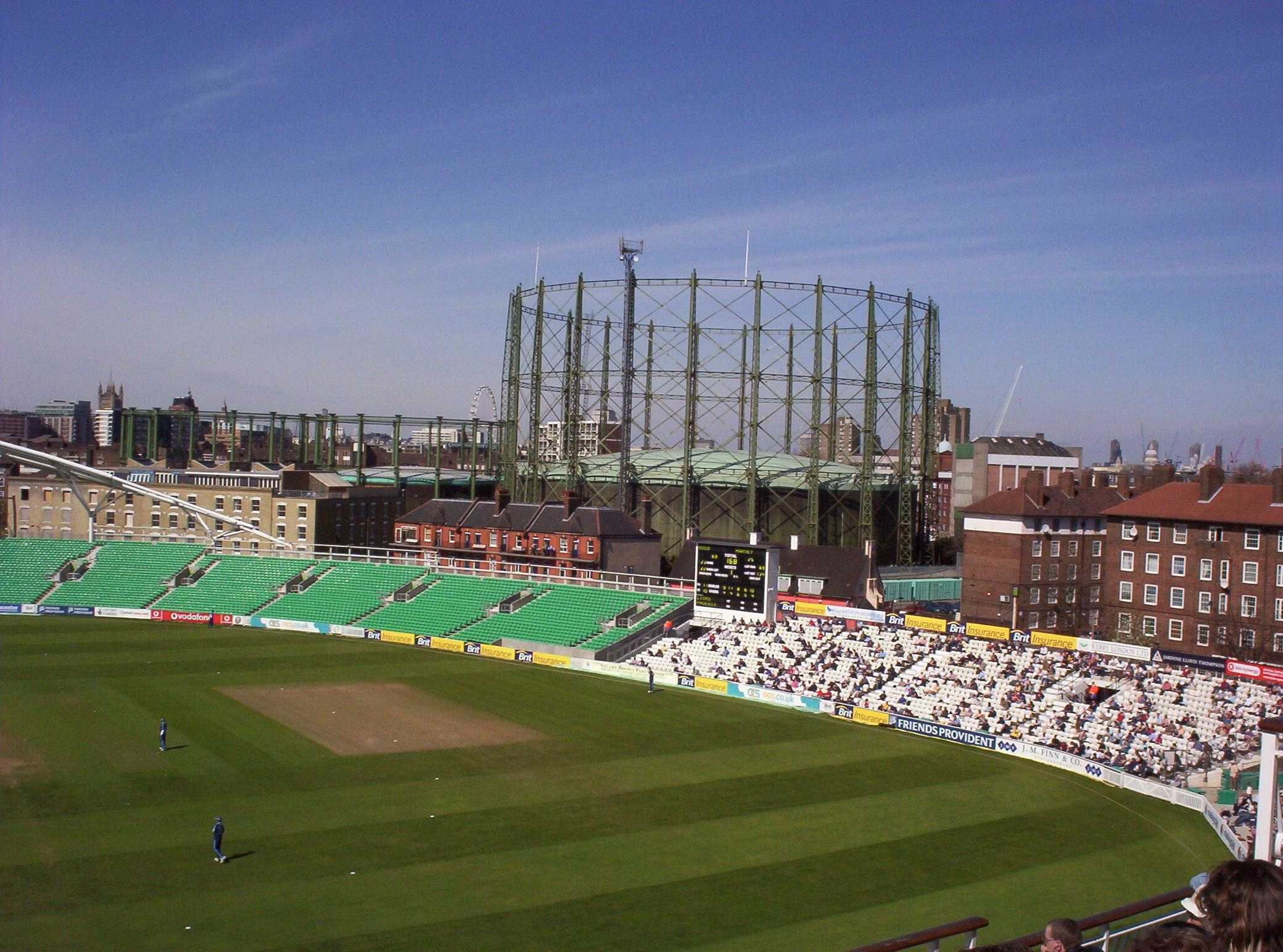
Surrey's home ground The Oval, overlooked by the famous gasholders.

Surrey County Cricket Club (Surrey CCC) is a first-class club in county cricket, one of eighteen in the domestic cricket structure of England and Wales. It represents the historic county of Surrey, including areas that now form South London. Teams representing the county are recorded from 1709 onwards; the current club was founded in 1845 and has held first-class status continuously since then. Surrey have played in every top-level domestic cricket competition in England, including every edition of the County Championship (which began in 1890).

The club's home ground is The Oval, in the Kennington area of Lambeth in South London. They have been based there continuously since 1845. The club also has an 'out ground' at Woodbridge Road, Guildford, where some home games are played each season.

Surrey's long history includes three major periods of great success. The club was unofficially proclaimed as "Champion County" seven times during the 1850s; it won the title eight times in nine years from 1887 to 1895 (including the first official County Championship in 1890); and won seven consecutive titles from 1952 to 1958. Surrey won 23 of its 28 county matches in 1955, the most wins by any team in the County Championship and a record which can no longer be beaten (as fewer than 23 matches have been played each season since 1993). Surrey have won the County Championship 22 times outright (and shared once), a number exceeded only by Yorkshire; their most recent championship win was in 2024.

The club's badge is the Prince of Wales's feathers, used since 1915, as the Prince of Wales owns the land on which The Oval stands. The club's traditional colour is chocolate brown, with players wearing brown caps and helmets, and the club is sometimes known by the nickname 'Brown Caps'.

== History ==
=== Earliest cricket in the county ===
Cricket is thought to have evolved from bat and ball games, played by children in southeast England during the Middle Ages. The first written record of the sport is from a witness statement by the Guildford resident and former Royal Grammar School pupil, John Derrick. In 1597 (old style, 1598 modern style), Derrick testified in a court case over the disputed enclosure of wasteland in the town that, as a child, "hee and his fellowes did runne and play there at Creckett and other plaies". In 1611, King James I gave to his eldest son, Henry, Prince of Wales, the manors of Kennington and Vauxhall, where the home ground of Surrey – The Oval – is today. To this day, the Prince of Wales's feathers feature on the club's badge.

Cricket became well established in Surrey during the 17th century and the earliest village matches took place before the English Civil War. It is believed that the earliest county teams were formed in the aftermath of the Restoration in 1660. The earliest known first-class match in Surrey was Croydon v London at Croydon on 1 July 1707. In 1709, the earliest known inter-county match took place between Kent and Surrey at Dartford Brent with £50 at stake. Surrey would continue to play cricket against other representative teams from that time onwards. Probably its greatest players during the underarm era were the famous bowler Lumpy Stevens and the wicket-keeper/batsman William Yalden, who both belonged to the Chertsey club.

=== 1845–1864 ===
Surrey CCC was founded on the evening of 18 August 1845 at the Horns Tavern in Kennington, South London, where around 100 representatives of various cricket clubs in Surrey agreed a motion put by William Denison (the club's first secretary) "that a Surrey club be now formed". A further meeting at the Tavern on 22 October 1845 formally constituted the club, appointed its officers and began enrolling members. A lease on Kennington Oval, a former market garden, had been obtained from the Duchy of Cornwall – which owned the land – by a Mr Houghton, and the ground's first game had been during the 1845 season. Mr Houghton was of the old Montpelier Cricket Club, 70 members of which formed the nucleus of the new Surrey County club. The Honourable Fred Ponsonby, later the Earl of Bessborough was appointed as the first vice-president.

Surrey's inaugural first-class match was against the MCC at The Oval at the end of May 1846. The club's first inter-county match, against Kent, was held at The Oval the following month and Surrey emerged victorious by ten wickets. However, the club did not do well that year, despite the extra public attractions at The Oval of a Walking Match and a Poultry Show. By the start of the 1847 season the club was £70 in debt and there was a motion to close. Ponsonby proposed that 6 life members be created for a fee of £12 each. His motion was duly passed, and the club survived. The threat of construction on The Oval was also successfully dispelled in 1848 thanks to the intervention of Prince Albert.

In 1855, Surrey secured a new 21-year lease on their home ground and the club went on to enjoy an exceptionally successful decade, being "Champion County" seven times from 1850 to 1859 and again in 1864. In 1857, all nine matches played by the county resulted in victory. This was the time of great players like William Caffyn, Julius Caesar, HH Stephenson and Tom Lockyer, and a fine captain in Frederick Miller. An incident in 1862, at the instigation of Edgar Willsher in a match between Surrey and England, led to the introduction of overarm bowling into cricket.

=== 1866–1882 ===
Following a brilliant season in 1864 when the team won eight and drew three of its eleven first-class matches, Surrey went into free-fall in the latter half of the 1860s, owing to the decline of key players Caesar, Stephenson and Mortlock and a puzzling inability to find quality bowlers to support the incomparable James Southerton, whose combination with wicket-keeper Ted Pooley virtually carried the team. Although Southerton broke many bowling records and Harry Jupp developed into the most prolific scorer among professional batsmen, Surrey's record in purely county matches during the seventeen seasons from 1866 to 1882 was 59 victories, 107 losses, two ties and 37 drawn games. The team bottomed out in 1871 when they did not win a single county match for the only time until 2008. Southerton, except in 1872 when fast bowler James Street helped him to win seven of twelve games, had no adequate support in bowling after underarm left-arm spinner George Griffith declined, and except when Richard Humphrey achieved prominence in 1872 the batting depended almost entirely on Jupp. The fielding was also generally below the standard expected of first-class cricket.

The appointment of renowned sports administrator Charles Alcock as secretary of the club – a paid position for the first time – in 1872 coincided with an improved performance; however, despite qualification rules being changed so that Southerton played every game for the county (up to 1872 he did not play whenever Sussex, the county of his birth, had a match on) Surrey performed poorly in the 1873 season. As mainstays Jupp and Southerton declined from 1875, matters were ameliorated by the discovery of class amateur batsmen in Bunny Lucas, Walter Read and William Game, but apart from 1877 Surrey never won half as many games as they lost and the inadequacy of the bowling on flat Oval pitches was a severe handicap.

=== Dominance in the early years of the Championship (1883–1899) ===
In 1880, although the county's record remained bad, Surrey began to make the steps that would return them to the top of the table with the appointment of John Shuter as captain and of Walter Read – established as aclass batsman but previously available only in August – as assistant secretary. The death of Southerton and retirement of other veterans paved the way for new talent in Maurice Read, William Roller, left-arm spinner Edward Barratt and pace bowler Charles Horner to lay a foundation for long-term success in the middle 1880s. With the rapid rise of George Lohmann in 1885, Surrey challenged for the unofficial title of Champion County for the first time in twenty years; then, by winning 32 of 42 matches in 1887, 1888 and 1889, Surrey were first or equal first in the final three years before official County Champions emerged.

Surrey then won official County Championship titles in 1890–1892 under John Shuter. After a disappointing season in 1893 when their batting failed on Oval pitches rendered fiery by several dry winters and springs, Kingsmill Key took over and led Surrey to further titles in 1894, 1895 and 1899. Leading players in these years were batsman Bobby Abel and a trio of top bowlers: George Lohmann, Bill Lockwood and Tom Richardson. In 1899, Abel's unbeaten 357 helped Surrey to a mammoth total of 811 against Somerset; only beaten in 2025 by 820 against Durham .

=== 1900–1939 ===
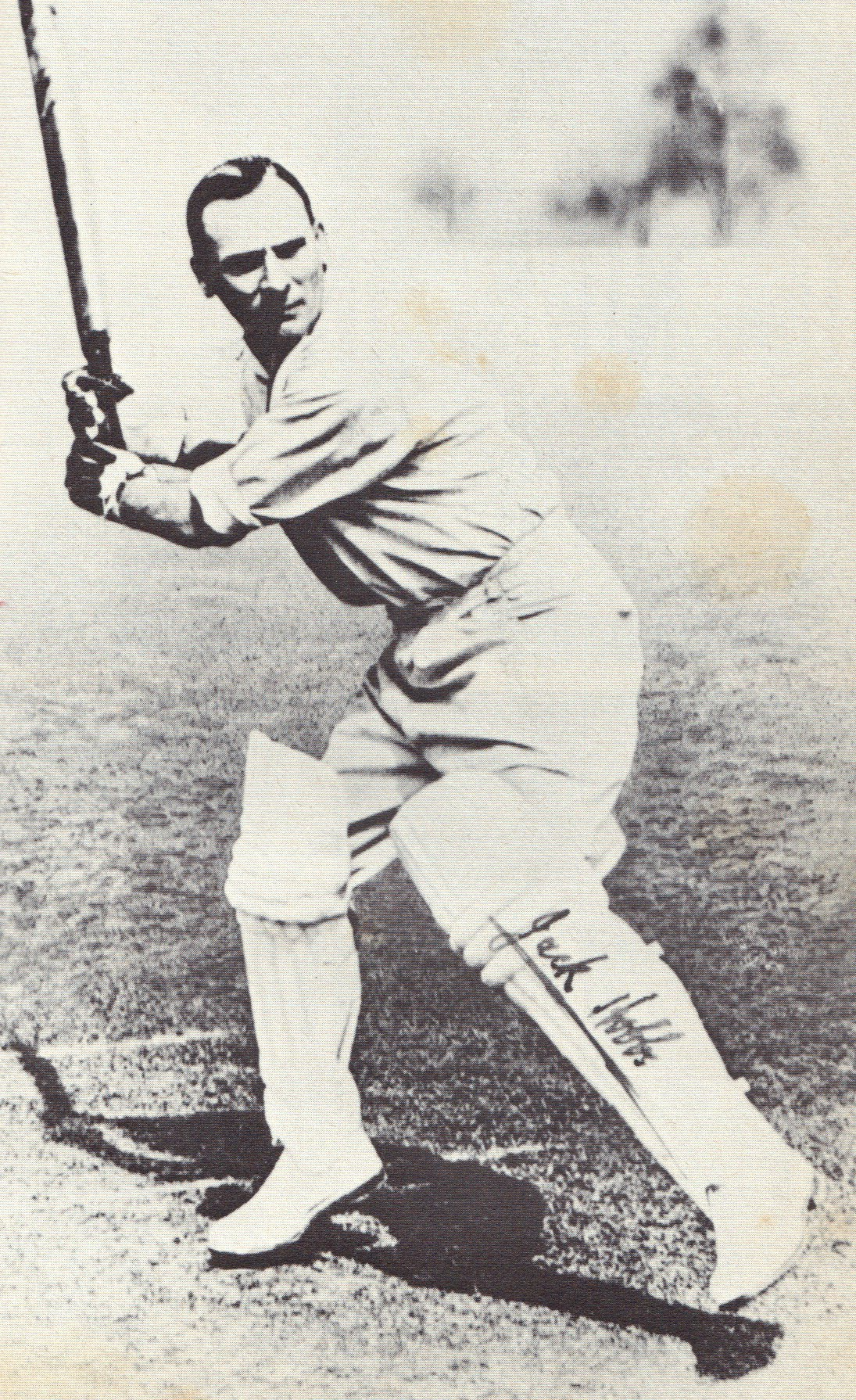
Surrey's all-time top scorer Jack Hobbs.

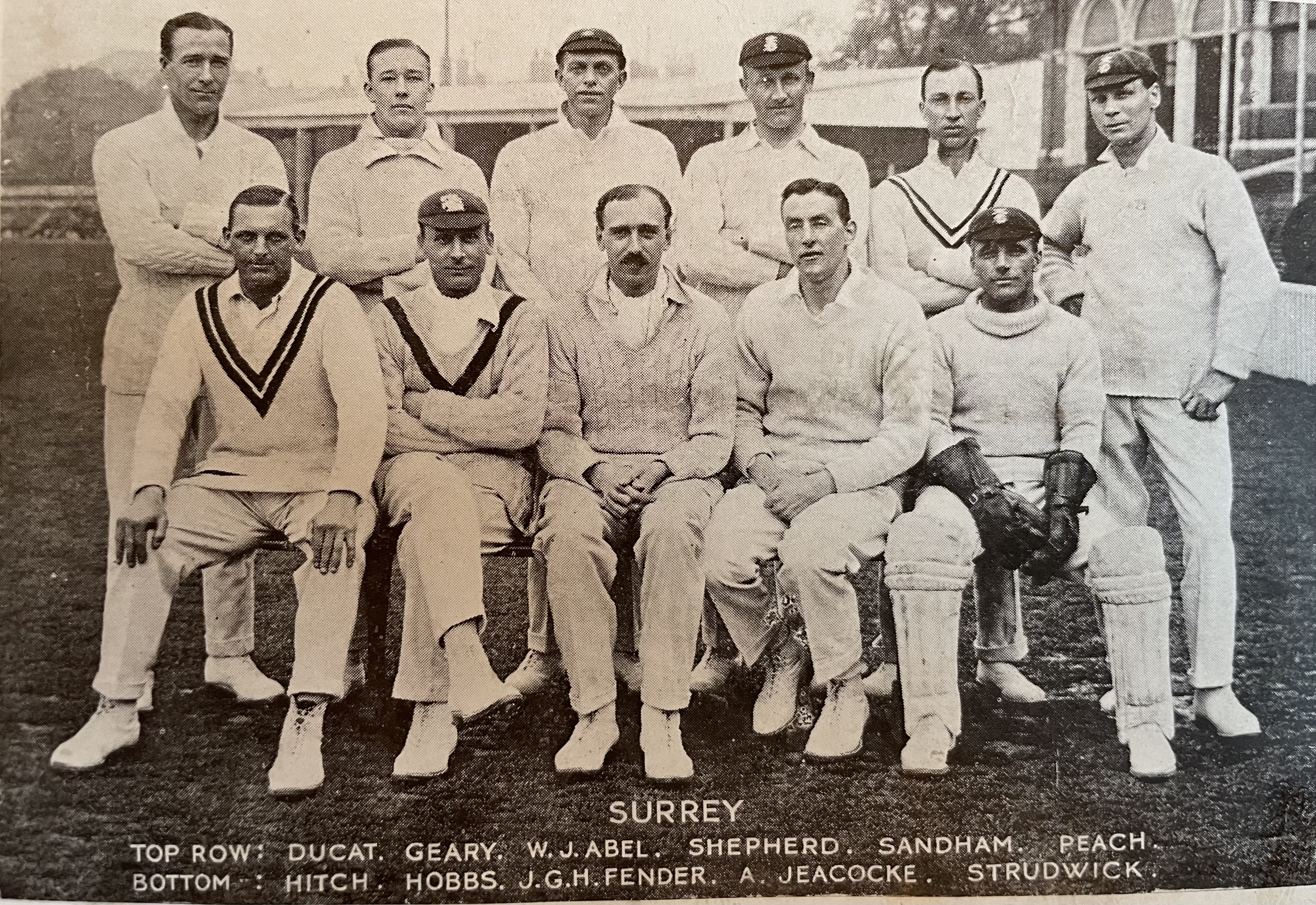
Surrey team, c. 1922, including Bill Hitch, Jack Hobbs, and Bert Strudwick

The start of the 20th century brought a decline in Surrey's fortunes, and they won the title only once during the next fifty years, in 1914. At the request of Surrey's captain Lord Dalmeny, the Prince of Wales (later Edward VIII) allowed the use of his feathers on the club badge. The club's most famous player was Jack Hobbs, who began playing for the county in 1905, and he had a notable opening partner till 1914 in Tom Hayward, who scored 3,518 runs in all first-class cricket in 1906, equalled C.B. Fry's record of 13 centuries in a season and, in one six-day period, scored two centuries at Trent Bridge and two more at Leicester. He scored his hundredth hundred at The Oval in 1913. Between the two World Wars, Surrey often had a good side, but it tended to be stronger in batting than in bowling; Hobbs played until 1934 with another good opening partner in Andrew Sandham. Hobbs scored more runs (61,760) and compiled more centuries (199) in first-class cricket than any other player in the history of the game. In recognition of his contribution to the team, the eponymous Jack Hobbs Gates were inaugurated at The Oval.

The side was not completely bereft of quality in the bowling department, however: Alf Gover took 200 wickets in both 1936 and 1937, a fine achievement for a fast bowler on the flat Oval track. The Oval pitches of this period tended to be very good for batting, and many matches were drawn. The club captain for much of this period was the affable and bohemian Percy Fender, whose closest colleague was the England captain of Bodyline fame (or infamy), Douglas Jardine. In 1938, Surrey played a home match away from The Oval for the first time, at Woodbridge Road in Guildford. After 1939, cricket took a break as the Second World War occupied the nation and The Oval was seized for Government use.

=== 1945–1958 ===
From 1948 to 1959, Surrey were the pre-eminent English county team, finishing either first or second in the county championship in 10 seasons out of 12. They finished runners-up in 1948, shared the championship with Lancashire in 1950, won seven consecutive outright titles from 1952 to 1958, and were runners-up again in 1959. Their margins of victory were usually large. For example, Yorkshire were runners-up in 1952 but finished 32 points behind.

Their success was built on a strong bowling attack, with Test seamer Alec Bedser supported by Tony Lock and Jim Laker, the latter widely regarded as one of the finest ever orthodox off-spinners. Lock and Laker made the most of Oval pitches, which were receptive to spin, but the club's success was also due to the positive and attacking captaincy of Stuart Surridge, who won the title in all five years of his leadership from 1952 to 1956. The team fielded well and a feature was close catching. The team had excellent batsmen, especially Peter May, and Ken Barrington.

=== 1959–2004 ===
A fallow period followed, and over the next forty years to 1998, Surrey won the County Championship only once, in 1971 during the career of England opener John Edrich and under the captaincy of Micky Stewart, but greater success was achieved in the shorter form of the game. In 1969, Surrey employed their very first overseas player: the very popular Pakistani leg break bowler Intikhab Alam. In addition to Intikhab, the Surrey attack in their Championship-winning side possessed four current or future England Test cricketers in Geoff Arnold, Robin Jackman, Bob Willis and Pat Pocock. Edrich was subsequently appointed captain in 1973 and led Surrey to second position in the County Championship in his first year in charge and then secured Surrey their first limited overs silverware the following year with victory in the Benson and Hedges Cup. Edrich's replacement as captain, Roger Knight, led Surrey to NatWest Trophy glory at Lord's in 1982. Following Intikhab Alam, other overseas players to appear for the county included the talented New Zealand opening batsman Geoff Howarth and two extremely fearsome fast bowlers, the West Indian Sylvester Clarke and the young Pakistani Waqar Younis.

Following a relative drought of first-class success, and with growing concern over the club's internal structure, the club's members forced a Special General Meeting in 1995. Following the resultant internal restructuring, a change of fortunes soon followed as new captain Alec Stewart – son of Micky – led the team to the Sunday League title in 1996. This in turn proved to be the catalyst for further success under the captaincy of Adam Hollioake and the influence of Keith Medlycott, who was county coach from 1997 to 2003. County Championship triumphs in 1999, 2000 and 2002 were complemented with Benson and Hedges Cup victories in 1997 and 2001, a National League Division Two title in 2000 and the inaugural Twenty20 Cup in 2003. This was in spite of the death of the highly talented all-rounder Ben Hollioake, Adam Hollioake's younger brother, who was involved in a fatal car accident in early 2002. That same year, Ali Brown posted what remained until 2022 a world record List A score of 268 against Glamorgan at The Oval, beating Graeme Pollock's former record score in the first of his two one-day double hundreds for Surrey. Adam Hollioake retired after the 2004 season.

=== 2005–2013 ===
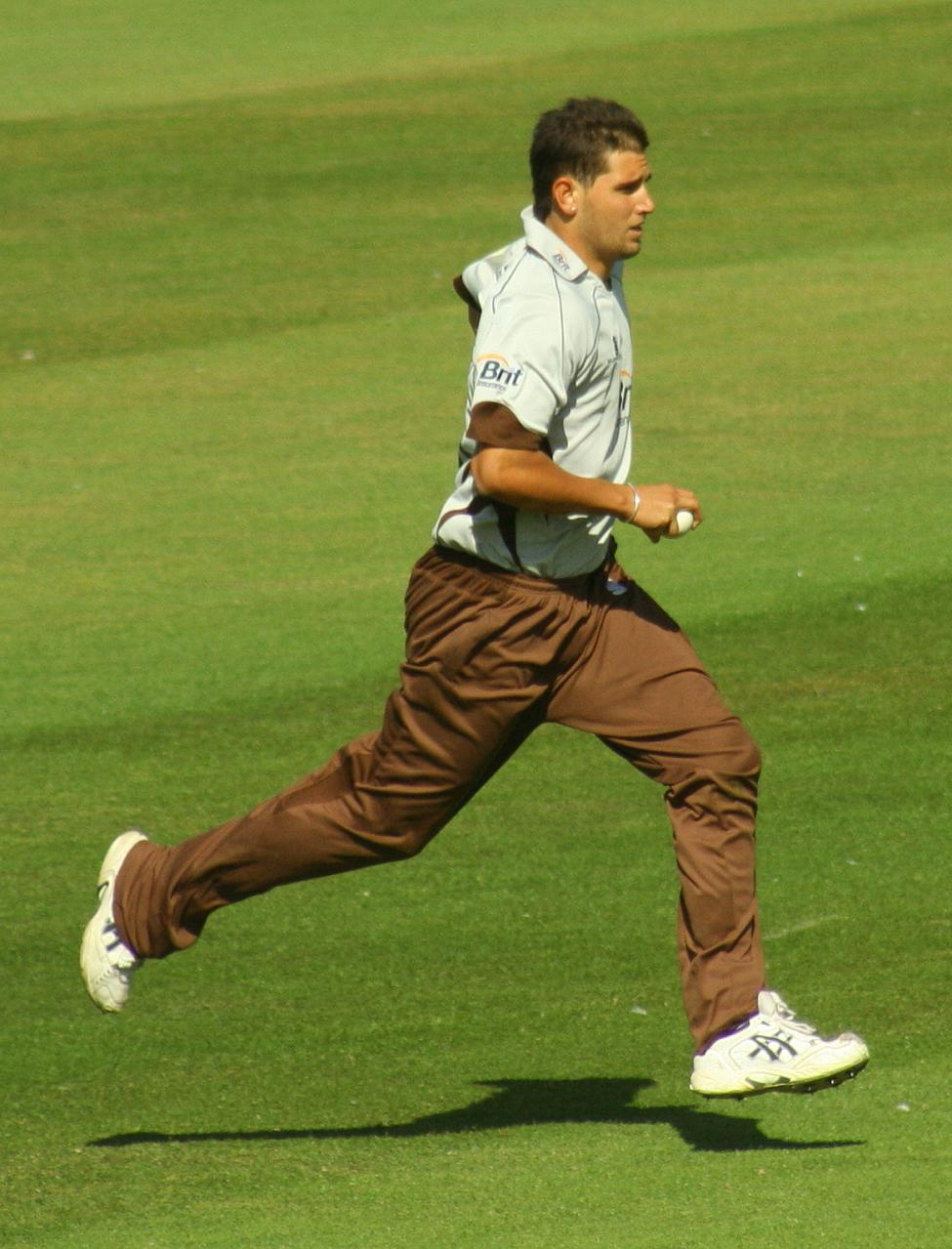
Jade Dernbach runs up to bowl against Sussex at the County Ground in Hove in the 2008 Twenty20 Cup.

The run of success came to an end in 2005 when an ageing Surrey team was relegated to Division Two of the Championship, but an immediate recovery took place in 2006 as Surrey won promotion as champions of Division Two. This proved short-lived however, and they were once again relegated to Division Two in 2008, failing to win a single game for the first time since 1871 and losing their last two games by an innings. Despite the end of a successful period, Surrey did post a List A world record score of 496–4 from 50 overs, the first of which was a maiden, against Gloucestershire at The Oval on 29 April 2007; Ali Brown top scored with 176 from just 97 deliveries.

The 2000s saw the retirement of Alec Stewart, Mark Butcher, Graham Thorpe and Martin Bicknell, who all represented England, as well as Saqlain Mushtaq who played for Pakistan. Another England player in Mark Ramprakash had joined Surrey in 2001 and, despite the club's travails, became the nineteenth player to pass 15,000 first-class runs for the county, doing so at an average of over 70. Surrey did not threaten to achieve a return to Division One of the County Championship after their relegation, or to win either 40-over competition until 2011. However, the club did have more luck in the Twenty20 Cup following victory in 2003, reaching finals day in 2004, 2005 and 2006, but failing to win the competition. 2011 saw a revival in the team's fortunes. They achieved a return to Division One of the County Championship by the margin of a single point, as they won their final four games of the season. They also won the CB40 competition.

After narrowly avoiding relegation in 2012, a season greatly overshadowed by the sad death of talented young batsman Tom Maynard in June, Surrey finished bottom of the Division One table the following year, and the Cricket Manager, Chris Adams, was sacked during the course of the season.

=== 2014 to present ===
Under the new management team of Alec Stewart, appointed director of cricket, and Graham Ford, recruited before the 2014 season to be head coach, they won the Division Two title in 2015 and were also beaten finalists in the Royal London Cup. In January 2016 it was announced that Ford had left to rejoin Sri Lanka as head coach. Michael Di Venuto took over as head coach for the 2016 season and after a poor start, with Surrey bottom of Division One after seven games, the team had a strong finish to the season, finishing in the middle of the Championship and again runners-up in the Royal London Cup.

Gareth Batty stood down as captain at the end of 2017, and the 2018 season under Rory Burns saw Surrey dominate the Championship, winning the title with two matches remaining. Surrey won three consecutive County Championship titles in 2022, 2023, and 2024. This was the first time that a county had won three successive titles since Yorkshire did so in the 1960s. Rory Burns was captain and Alec Stewart was director of cricket for all four wins, and Gareth Batty was head coach for the last three.

In 2025 Surrey finished second in the County Championship, losing out on the title after a dramatic September defeat to eventual champions Nottinghamshire. In 2026 they finished a disappointing seventh, their lowest position since 2019.

== Branding ==
Since the club's formation, its official colour has been chocolate brown. Traditionally, and in current first-class matches, Surrey fielders wear a brown cricket cap with their cricket whites, whilst batsmen wear a brown helmet. As a result, the club is occasionally nicknamed the 'Brown Caps'.

Surrey's badge is a brown shield with white Prince of Wales's feathers and the club name. The feathers were adopted in 1915, when Lord Rosebery (a former Surrey captain) obtained permission to use them from the Prince of Wales, whose Duchy of Cornwall estate is the landlord of The Oval. The feathers on the badge incorporate the number 1845, the year of the club's establishment.

Surrey's limited overs sides have played under a variety of names. The name Surrey Lions was used prior to 2006 and from 2010 to 2012, whilst from 2006 to 2010 they were the Surrey Brown Caps. They currently simply use the one-word name Surrey. They have also used numerous colours for their limited overs kits, including combinations of black, blue, brown, beige, gold, silver and green. Currently, players wear a predominantly black kit with fluorescent blue decoration for one-day matches, and black trousers with fluorescent blue shirts for T20 games.

== Grounds ==
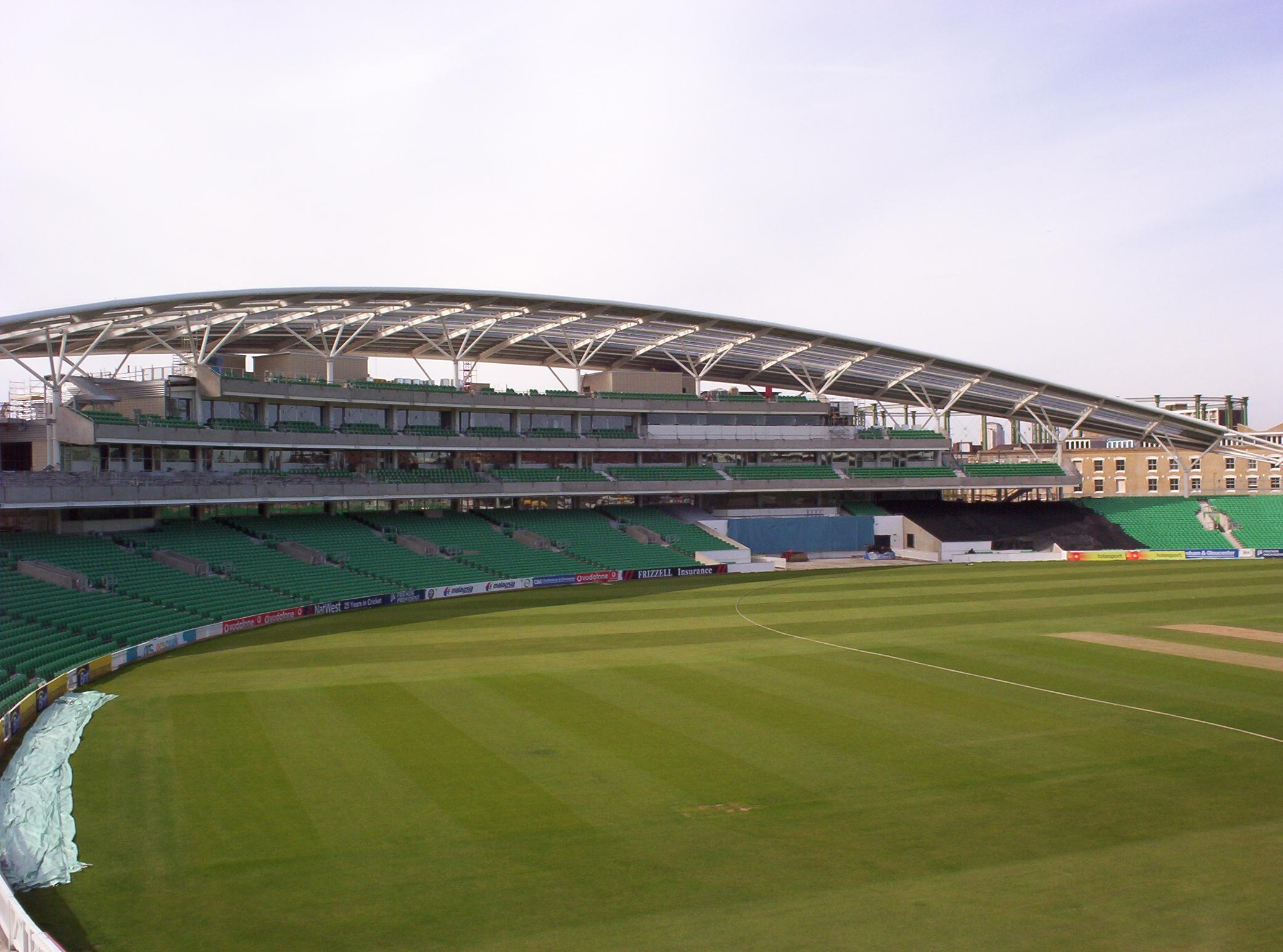
The JM Finn Stand at the Vauxhall End of the ground

Since their formation, Surrey have played the overwhelming majority of their home matches at The Oval. The stadium currently holds 25,500 people and is the third largest cricket ground in England, after Lord's and Edgbaston. The Oval was first leased by the club in 1845 from the Duchy of Cornwall and it remains so to this day.

The Oval is a long-standing and frequent Test match venue for the England cricket team, traditionally hosting the last Test match of each English summer, in late August or early September.

Surrey play some matches each year at Woodbridge Road, Guildford, which holds 4,500 spectators. This is known as an 'out-ground' and currently hosts one County Championship match and one List A match each season. All other home matches are played at The Oval.

Surrey have played home matches at fourteen different out-grounds in total. The Oval hosted all but two Surrey home matches between 1846 and 1938. The following table gives details of every venue at which Surrey have hosted men's first-class, List A or Twenty20 cricket matches:

Name of ground	Location	Year	FC matches	LA matches	T20 matches	Total
The Oval	Kennington	1846–present	1850	458	127	2435
Woodbridge Road	Guildford	1938–present	100	44	0	144
Whitgift School	Croydon	2000–2011	9	13	1	23
British Aerospace Company Ground	Byfleet	1970–1979	0	10	0	10
Kenton Court Meadow	Sunbury-on-Thames	1972–1974	0	3	0	3
Hawker's Sports Ground	Kingston-upon-Thames	1946	2	0	0	2
St John's School	Leatherhead	1969–1972	0	2	0	2
Metropolitan Police Sports Club Ground	East Molesey	2003	0	0	2	2
Broadwater Park	Godalming	1854	1	0	0	1
Reigate Priory Cricket Club Ground	Reigate	1909	1	0	0	1
Cheam Road	Sutton	1969	0	1	0	1
Charterhouse School	Godalming	1972	0	1	0	1
Decca Sports Ground	Tolworth	1973	0	1	0	1
Hurst Park Club Ground	East Molesey	1983	0	1	0	1
Recreation Ground	Banstead	1984	1	0	0	1
Source: CricketArchive; Updated: 3 April 2023

== Attendances ==
As of 2025, the highest recorded attendance for a Surrey County Cricket Club county match in the 21st century was 14,982 spectators, during a match against Essex at the Kia Oval in 2025. In 2025, Surrey's home County Championship matches drew an average of 13,206 spectators per game.

== Rivalry with Middlesex ==
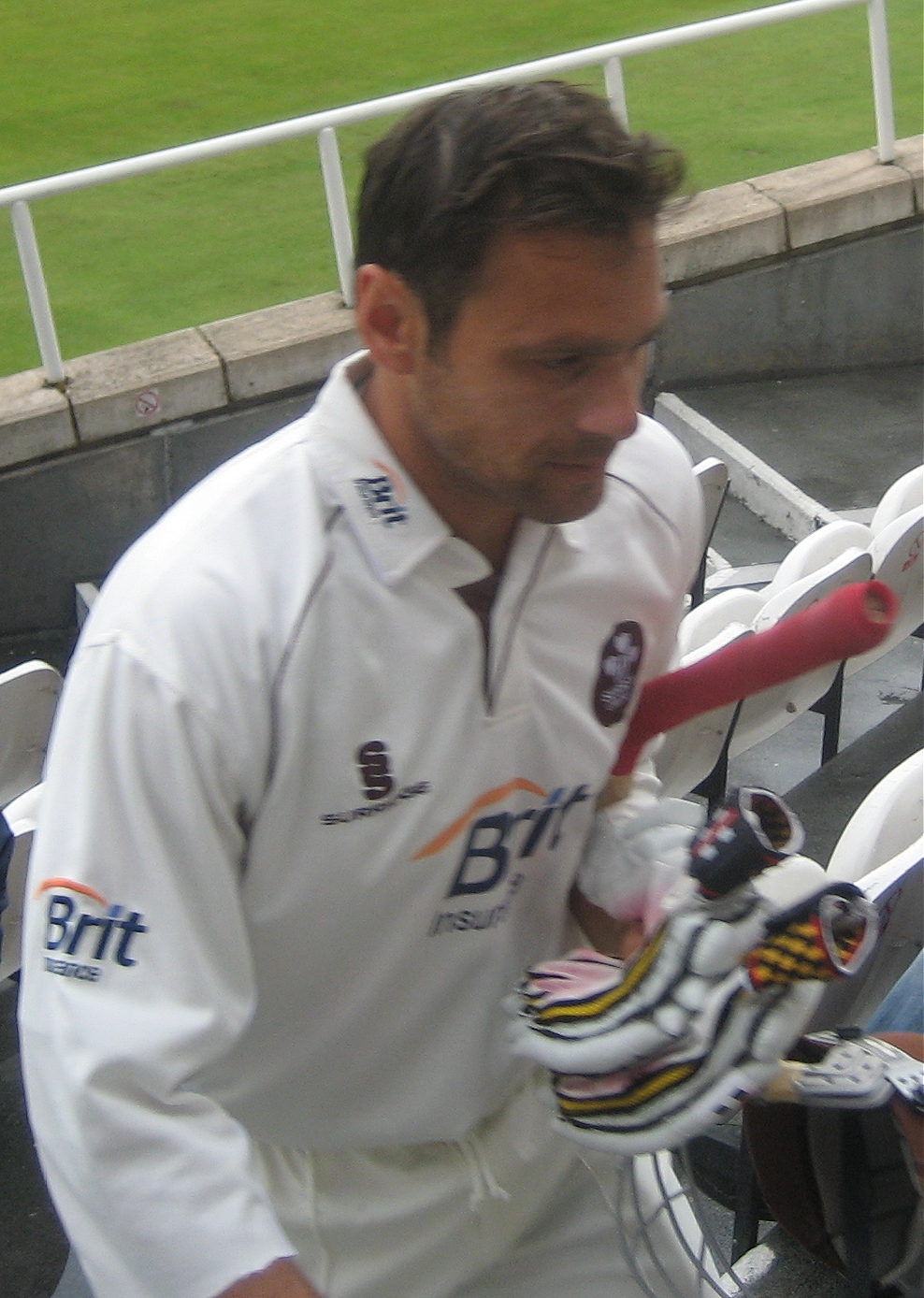
Mark Ramprakash, who joined Surrey from Middlesex in 2001

Surrey contest the London derby with Middlesex, so-called because of the two traditional counties' proximity to, and overlap with, today's Greater London, which was only created in 1965. The match generally draws the biggest crowds of the season for either team. In first-class cricket, Surrey have won more of the 256 London derbies than Middlesex, but the commonest result is the draw, while Middlesex have the slight edge in one-day cricket with 28 wins to Surrey's 26. Surrey have won 12 of the 17 Twenty20 London derbies.

Match format	Played	Surrey win	Middlesex win	Tie	Draw or no result
First-class	267	90	78	2	97
One-day	61	26	28	1	6
Twenty20	17	12	5	0	0
Total	334	127	107	3	97

== Finances ==
Surrey County Cricket Club traditionally has relatively strong finances in terms of the county game (whose 18 counties' aggregate losses amounted to over £9 million in 2010), which is in no small part due to the capability of and agreement with its principal home ground, The Oval, to stage Test cricket on a yearly basis, alongside limited overs internationals. However, despite its reputation as an aggressively commercial club, this reputation took a hit with the club announcing pre-tax losses of £502,000 for the 2010 financial year, as turnover dropped by 20% to £20.5m. The club had previously benefited from a sunnier balance sheet due to the sale of ground naming rights and the re-development of the Vauxhall End at The Oval.

In the 2008 financial year, a year when the club did not win a single match in the Second Division Championship, Surrey had achieved pre-tax profits of £583,000 with a turnover of approaching £24 million, as membership swelled to 10,113. Record profit and turnover were announced for 2009 thanks to the staging of international cricket matches with the figures growing to £752,000 and £25.5 million, respectively. In 2010, the club was in a state of "financial strife," with twenty staff fired after lacklustre attendance. The club began focusing under new leadership in 2011 on marketing the Oval.

Between 2007 and 2020, the club had a period of "steady revenue growth," and in 2020, the club was in the process of building a 95-room hotel across the road from the Oval House, to "diversify" its revenue mix. Surrey CCC launched a bond in September 2019 to fund redeveloping the Oval cricket ground. By 2020, its "off-field arm" brought in half the club's revenue. The club's finance director in March 2020 said a "record-breaking season" at the Kia Oval in 2019 would cushion the club from the financial impact of COVID-19. Events at the venue as well as "wider interest in cricket, resulted in a record year with annual pre-tax profit at around £6m that more than doubled the previous year’s profits and revenue of £40m," which was 30 per cent higher than 2018.

== Sponsorship ==
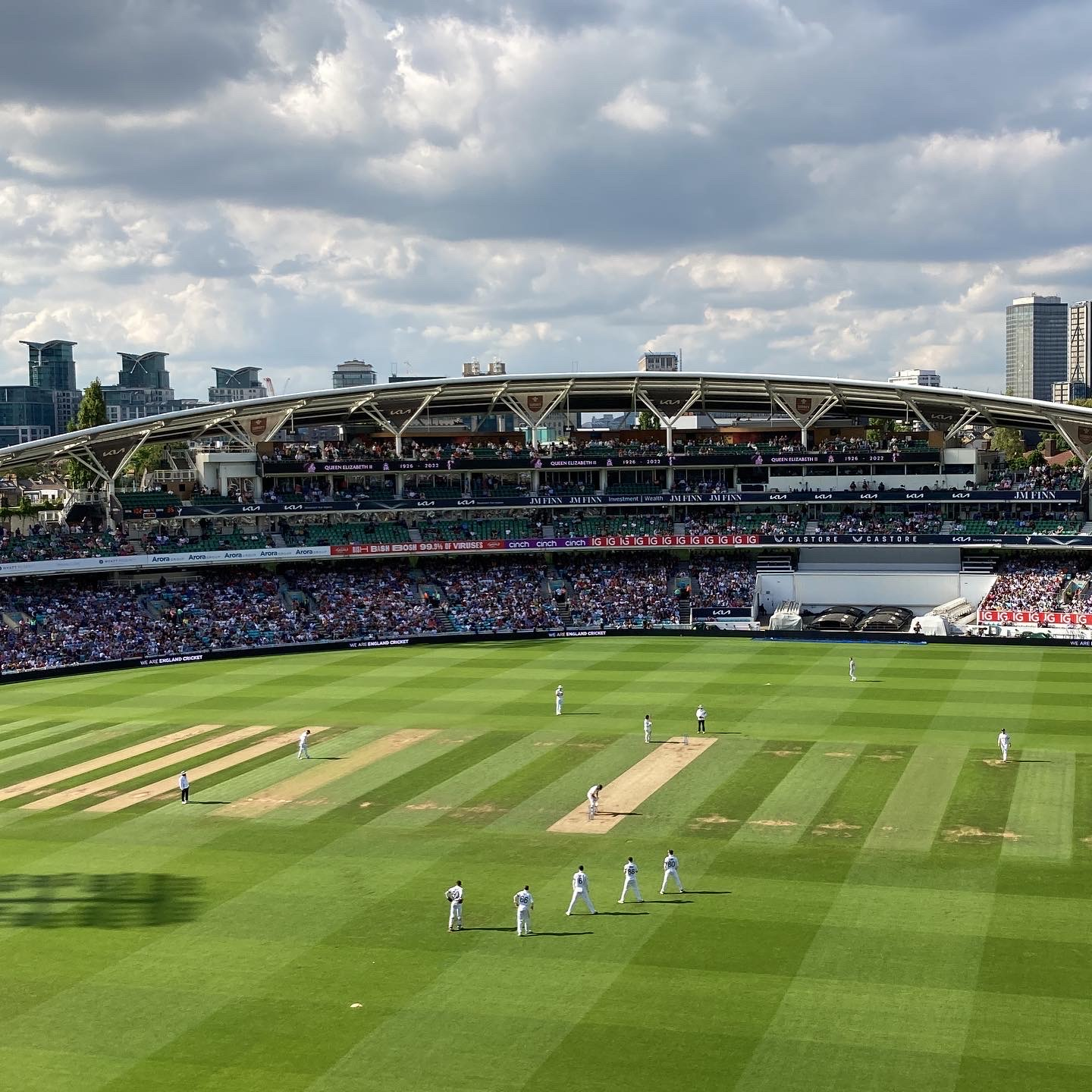
The Kia Oval during the England vs South Africa Test Match in 2022

Surrey's current main sponsor is Kia Motors, who paid £3.5m over five years to sponsor the shirts and the ground naming rights for The Oval. Former main sponsors were Brit plc who paid £500,000.00 per year (2004 to 2009) and AMP Limited who paid £250,000 (2002). Since 2023, the kit supplier has been Castore.

Year	Kit Manufacturer	Shirt Sponsor	The Oval Name (Note: Prior to 1989, no naming rights were attached to The Oval and it was called Kennington Oval.)
1989			The Foster's Oval
1990			The Foster's Oval
1991			The Foster's Oval
1992			The Foster's Oval
1993			The Foster's Oval
1994			The Foster's Oval
1995			The Foster's Oval
1996			The Foster's Oval
1997			The Foster's Oval
1998			The Foster's Oval
1999		Computacenter	The Foster's Oval
2000	Exito	Computacenter	The Foster's Oval
2001	Exito	Computacenter	The AMP Oval
2002	Exito	AMP	The AMP Oval
2003	Exito	RAC	The AMP Oval
2004	Surridge Sport	Brit Insurance	The Brit Oval
2005	Surridge Sport	Brit Insurance	The Brit Oval
2006	Surridge Sport	Brit Insurance	The Brit Oval
2007	Surridge Sport	Brit Insurance	The Brit Oval
2008	Surridge Sport	Brit Insurance	The Brit Oval
2009	Surridge Sport	Brit Insurance	The Brit Oval
2010	Prostar Sports	Brit Insurance	The Brit Oval
2011	MKK Sports	Kia	The Kia Oval
2012	MKK Sports	Kia	The Kia Oval
2013	Surridge Sport	Kia	The Kia Oval
2014	Surridge Sport	Kia	The Kia Oval
2015	Under Armour	Kia	The Kia Oval
2016	Adidas	Kia	The Kia Oval
2017	Adidas	Kia	The Kia Oval
2018	Adidas	Kia	The Kia Oval
2019	Adidas	Kia	The Kia Oval
2020	Adidas	Kia	The Kia Oval
2021	Adidas	Kia	The Kia Oval
2022	Adidas	Kia	The Kia Oval
2023	Castore	Kia	The Kia Oval

== Players ==
=== Current squad ===
- No. denotes the player's squad number, as worn on the back of their shirt.
- ‡ denotes players with international caps.
- * denotes a player who has been awarded a county cap.

No.	Name	Nat	Birth date	Batting style	Bowling style	Notes
Batters
17	Rory Burns* ‡	England	26 August 1990 (age 36)	Left-handed	Right-arm medium	Club captain
20	Jason Roy* ‡	England	21 July 1990 (age 36)	Right-handed	Right-arm medium	
45	Dom Sibley* ‡	England	5 September 1995 (age 31)	Right-handed	Right-arm leg break	Vice captain
64	Adam Thomas	England	6 July 2006 (age 20)	Right-handed	Right-arm medium	
75	Nikhil Gorantla	England	21 June 2003 (age 23)	Right-handed	Right-arm medium	
All-rounders
5	Tommy Ealham	England	26 March 2004 (age 22)	Left-handed	Right-arm off break	
9	Will Jacks* ‡	England	21 November 1998 (age 27)	Right-handed	Right-arm off break	England central contract
16	Jordan Clark*	England	14 October 1990 (age 36)	Right-handed	Right-arm fast-medium	
22	Ralphie Albert	England	16 October 2007 (age 19)	Right-handed	Slow left-arm orthodox	
26	Ryan Patel*	England	26 October 1997 (age 29)	Left-handed	Right-arm medium	
28	Dan Lawrence* ‡	England	12 July 1997 (age 29)	Right-handed	Right-arm off break	England central contract
30	Tom Lawes	England	25 December 2002 (age 23)	Right-handed	Right-arm fast-medium	
34	Chris Jordan* ‡	England	4 October 1988 (age 38)	Right-handed	Right-arm fast-medium	White ball contract
54	Ollie Sykes	England	6 March 2005 (age 21)	Left-handed	Right-arm medium	
58	Sam Curran* ‡	England	3 June 1998 (age 28)	Left-handed	Left-arm fast-medium	T20 captain; England central contract
59	Tom Curran* ‡	England	12 March 1995 (age 31)	Right-handed	Right-arm fast-medium	
Wicket-keepers
7	Ben Foakes* ‡	England	15 February 1993 (age 33)	Right-handed	—	
11	Jamie Smith* ‡	England	12 July 2000 (age 26)	Right-handed	—	England central contract
32	Ollie Pope* ‡	England	2 January 1998 (age 28)	Right-handed	Right-arm leg break	England central contract
Bowlers
8	Daniel Worrall* ‡	Australia	10 July 1991 (age 35)	Right-handed	Right-arm fast-medium	UK Passport
15	Matthew Fisher ‡	England	9 November 1997 (age 29)	Right-handed	Right-arm fast-medium	England central contract
23	Alex French	England	23 July 2007 (age 19)	Right-handed	Right-arm fast-medium	
24	Reece Topley ‡	England	21 February 1994 (age 32)	Right-handed	Left-arm fast-medium	
29	Nathan Barnwell	England	3 February 2003 (age 23)	Right-handed	Right-arm fast-medium	
37	Gus Atkinson* ‡	England	19 January 1998 (age 28)	Right-handed	Right-arm fast-medium	England central contract
68	Yousef Majid	England	8 September 2003 (age 23)	Left-handed	Slow left-arm orthodox	
88	Jamie Overton* ‡	England	10 April 1994 (age 32)	Right-handed	Right-arm fast	England central contract; White ball contract
99	James Anderson ‡	England	30 July 1982 (age 44)	Left-handed	Right-arm fast-medium	
—	Henry Crocombe ‡	England	20 September 2001 (age 25)	Right-handed	Right-arm fast-medium	England central contract
—	Nathan Sowter	Australia	12 October 1992 (age 34)	Right-handed	Right-arm leg break	UK passport; White ball contract
Source: Updated: 27 September 2026

=== Notable former players ===
The following cricketers have made 200 or more appearances for Surrey in first-class, List A and Twenty20 cricket combined.

- (England) Bobby Abel
- (England) Geoff Arnold
- (England) Tom Barling
- (England) Ken Barrington
- (England) Jonathan Batty
- (England) Alec Bedser
- (England) Eric Bedser
- (England) Joey Benjamin
- (England) Darren Bicknell
- (England) Martin Bicknell
- (England) Bill Brockwell
- (England) Ted Brooks
- (England) Ali Brown
- (England) Alan Butcher
- (England) Mark Butcher
- (Cricket West Indies) Sylvester Clarke
- (England) Tom Clark
- (England) Grahame Clinton
- (England) Bernard Constable
- (England) Andy Ducat
- (England) John Edrich
- (England) Mike Edwards
- (England) Percy Fender
- (England) Mark Feltham
- (England) Laurie Fishlock
- (England) David Fletcher
- (England) David Gibson
- (England) Alf Gover
- (England) Bob Gregory
- (England) Ian Greig
- (England) George Griffith
- (England) Ernie Hayes
- (England) Tom Hayward
- (England) Bill Hitch
- (England) Jack Hobbs
- (England) Fred Holland
- (England) Adam Hollioake
- (New Zealand) Geoff Howarth
- (England) Thomas Humphrey
- (Pakistan) Intikhab Alam
- (England) Robin Jackman
- (England) Harry Jupp
- (England) Kingsmill Key
- (England) Roger Knight
- (England) Jim Laker
- (England) Walter Lees
- (England) Peter Loader
- (England) Tony Lock
- (England) Bill Lockwood
- (England) Arnold Long
- (England) Arthur McIntyre
- (England) Peter May
- (England) Scott Newman
- (England) Jack Parker
- (England) Alan Peach
- (England) Pat Pocock
- (England) Ted Pooley
- (England) Mark Ramprakash
- (England) Maurice Read
- (England) Walter Read
- (England) Jack Richards
- (England) Tom Richardson
- (England) Graham Roope
- (England) Tom Rushby
- (England) Ian Salisbury
- (England) Andy Sandham
- (England) Tom Shepherd
- (England) John Shuter
- (England) David Smith
- (England) Razor Smith
- (England) Stan Squires
- (England) Alec Stewart
- (England) Micky Stewart
- (England) Stewart Storey
- (England) Bert Strudwick
- (England) Stuart Surridge
- (England) David Thomas
- (England) Graham Thorpe
- (England) David Ward
- (England) Ian Ward
- (England) Eddie Watts
- (England) Henry Wood
- (Pakistan) Younis Ahmed

== Club captains ==
Surrey have had 41 club captains since 1846. The club captain leads the team on the field, unless he is on international duty, injured or otherwise unavailable. Surrey's most successful County Championship captain is Stuart Surridge, who won the title in each year of his captaincy in a five-year run stretching from 1952 to 1956. The current captain since his appointment in 2018 is Rory Burns. For the 2018 season onwards, the club announced the creation of a separate captain specifically for Twenty20 matches, with experienced bowler Jade Dernbach being appointed to the role.

== Officers ==
=== Presidents ===
The position of president is an honorary one. The president does not take a salary and is chosen from supporters of the club. Past presidents have included former prime minister Sir John Major and the newsreader Sir Trevor McDonald. Former players to have held the post include John Edrich.

=== Secretaries and chief executives ===
The chief executive is the official in charge of the day-to-day running of the club. Prior to 1993, the position was known as secretary.

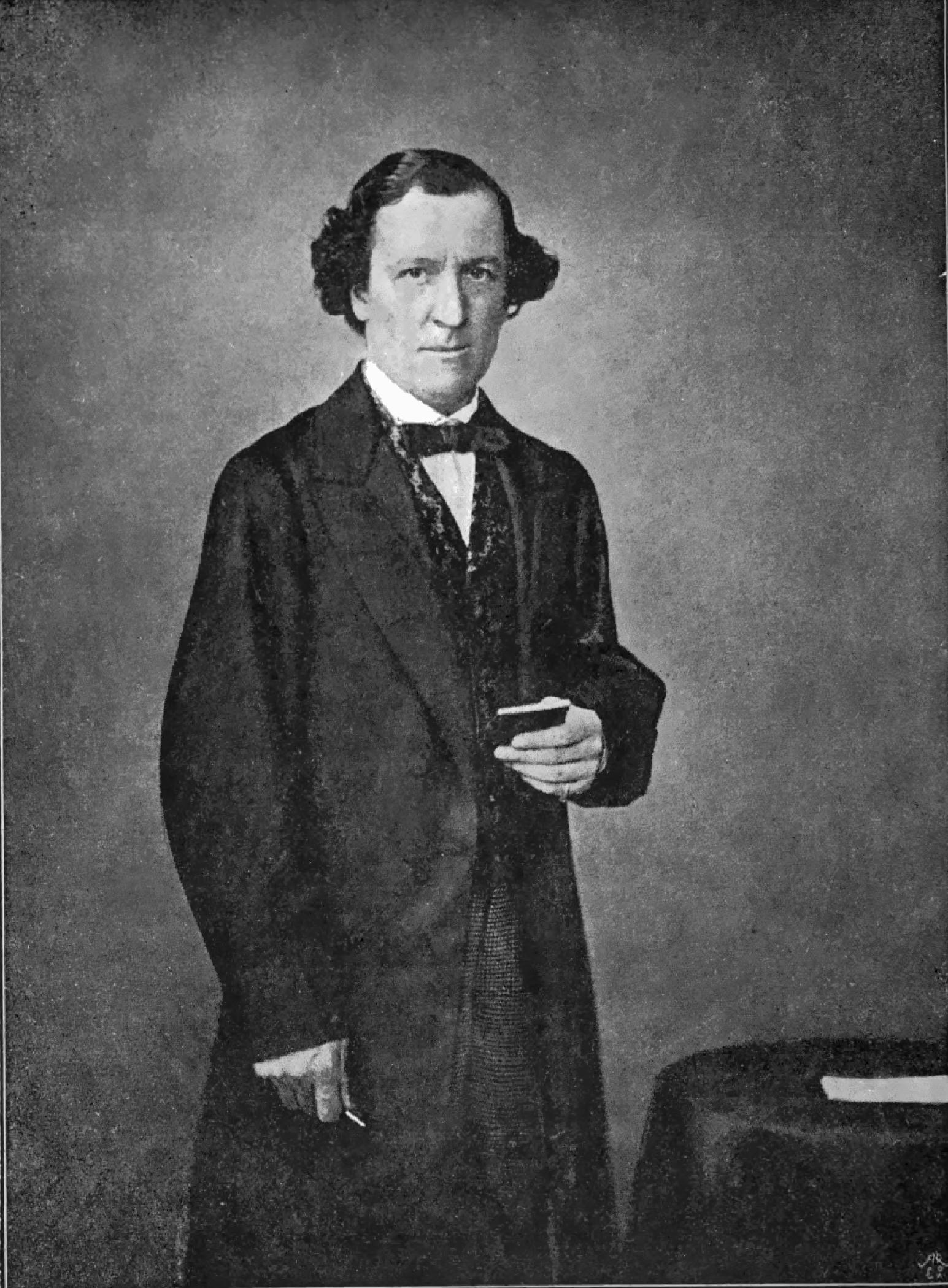
William Burrup, Hon. Sec. 1855–1872

No.	Name	Years
1	William Denison	1845–1848
2	John Burrup	1848–1855
3	William Burrup	1855–1872
4	C. W. Alcock	1872–1907
5	Brian Castor	1947–1957
6	Geoffrey Howard	1965–1975
7	W. H. Sillitoe	1975–1978
8	Ian Scott-Browne	1978–1989
9	David Seward	1989–1992
10	Glyn Woodman	1993–1995
11	Paul Sheldon	1996–2011
12	Richard Gould	2011–2021
13	Steve Elworthy	2021 to date

=== Managing Directors of Cricket ===
- Angus Mackay 2008–2010

=== Directors of Cricket ===
- Alec Stewart 2014 to 2024

=== Managers ===
- Micky Stewart 1979–1986
- Alan Butcher 2006–2008
- Chris Adams 2008–2013

== Coaching staff ==
=== Coaches since 1959 ===
- Arthur McIntyre (1959–1976)
- Fred Titmus (1977–1978)
- Ian Salisbury (2012–2013)
- Graham Ford (2014-2016)
- Michael di Venuto (2016-2020)
- Vikram Solanki (2020–2022)
- Gareth Batty (2022 to date)

== Scorers since 1995 ==
- Keith Booth 1995–2017
- Phil Makepeace 2018–2020
- Debbie Beesley 2021 to present

== Honours ==
=== First XI honours ===
- Champion County (Note: An unofficial seasonal title sometimes proclaimed by consensus of media and historians prior to December 1889 when the official County Championship was constituted. Although there are ante-dated claims prior to 1873, when residence qualifications were introduced, it is only since that ruling that any quasi-official status can be ascribed.) (3) – 1864, 1887, 1888; shared (1) – 1889
- County Championship (22) – 1890, 1891, 1892, 1894, 1895, 1899, 1914, 1952, 1953, 1954, 1955, 1956, 1957, 1958, 1971, 1999, 2000, 2002, 2018, 2022, 2023, 2024; shared (1) – 1950
  - Division Two (2) – 2006, 2015
- FP Trophy (Note: Formerly known as the Gillette Cup (1963–1980), NatWest Trophy (1981–2000) and C&G Trophy (2001–2006).) (1) – 1982
- Clydesdale Bank 40 (1) – 2011
- NatWest Pro40 League (Note: Formerly known as the Sunday League (1969–1998).) (2) – 1996, 2003
  - Division Two (1) – 2000
- Twenty20 Cup (1) – 2003
- Benson and Hedges Cup (3) – 1974, 1997, 2001

=== Second XI honours ===
- Second XI Championship (6) – 1966, 1968, 1975, 1988, 1992, 2009
- Second XI Trophy (1) – 2001
- Minor Counties Cricket Championship (4) – 1939, 1950, 1954, 1955

== Bibliography ==
- Altham, Harry (1962). A History of Cricket, Volume 1 (to 1914). George Allen & Unwin.
- Birley, Derek (1999). A Social History of English Cricket. Aurum Press Ltd. ISBN 1-85410-941-3.
- Bowen, Rowland (1970). Cricket: A History of its Growth and Development. Eyre & S. ISBN 0-413-27860-3.
- Lemmon, David (1989). The History of Surrey County Cricket Club. London: Christopher Helm Publishers Ltd. ISBN 0-7470-2010-8.
- Lillywhite, Fred (1996) [1862]. Cricket Scores and Biographies of Celebrated Cricketers: 1841–1848 v. 3. Roger Heavens. ISBN 1-900592-25-8.
- Lodge, Jerry (2004). Into the second century: Surrey CCC a history since 1945. Stroud: Tempus. ISBN 0-7524-3177-3.
- Rose, David (2001). Guildford : Our town. Derby: Breedon Books. ISBN 978-1-85-983262-2.
- Ross, Gordon (1971). A History of County Cricket: Surrey. Arthur Barker Ltd. ISBN 0-213-00390-2.
- Surrey County Cricket Club First-Class Records 1846–2000, Limited Overs Records 1963–2000. Surrey CCC.
- Surrey CCC Yearbooks
- Playfair Cricket Annual (various editions)
- Wisden Cricketers' Almanack (various editions)
