= Second XI Championship =

English cricket competition

The Second XI Championship is a season-long cricket competition in England that is competed for by the reserve teams of those county cricket clubs that have first-class status. The competition started in 1959 and has been contested annually ever since.

All the then 17 first-class counties contested the first two competitions in 1959 and 1960; the next season when all 17 entered was 1977, though the number of teams in any one year was never lower than 14 (in 1971). Gloucestershire and Somerset entered a combined team for two seasons, 1967 and 1968.

Before 1959, many second XIs of the first-class counties contested the Minor Counties Cricket Championship, winning the championship 23 times. A few continued to do so and the last to withdraw from the Minor Counties was Somerset 2nd XI after the 1987 season, though Somerset had participated in both competitions from 1959 to 1966 and since 1975.

At present, all 18 current first-class counties take part in the Second XI Championship along with the MCC Young Cricketers team. It was not possible for all teams to play each other and different numbers of matches were played by each team. As a result, the table had to be based on a percentage of points obtained to points possible. Therefore, for 2009 the competition was split into North and South divisions, with ten teams in each division and each team in a division playing all the others once. The team added to make the number up to twenty was Marylebone Cricket Club Universities. The two divisional winners play each other to determine the overall champion.

In 2001, a Second XI Trophy was introduced. This is a limited overs competition with the teams forming zones in the initial stage. The zone winners progress to semi-finals and then to a final.

A Second XI T20 championship was launched in 2011.

== List of Second XI Champions ==
- 1959 Gloucestershire II
- 1960 Northamptonshire II
- 1961 Kent II
- 1962 Worcestershire II
- 1963 Worcestershire II
- 1964 Lancashire II
- 1965 Glamorgan II
- 1966 Surrey II
- 1967 Hampshire II
- 1968 Surrey II
- 1969 Kent II
- 1970 Kent II
- 1971 Hampshire II
- 1972 Nottinghamshire II
- 1973 Essex II
- 1974 Middlesex II
- 1975 Surrey II
- 1976 Kent II
- 1977 Yorkshire II
- 1978 Sussex II
- 1979 Warwickshire II
- 1980 Glamorgan II
- 1981 Hampshire II
- 1982 Worcestershire II
- 1983 Leicestershire II
- 1984 Yorkshire II
- 1985 Nottinghamshire II
- 1986 Lancashire II
- 1987 Kent II, Yorkshire II (shared)
- 1988 Surrey II
- 1989 Middlesex II
- 1990 Sussex II
- 1991 Yorkshire II
- 1992 Surrey II
- 1993 Middlesex II
- 1994 Somerset II
- 1995 Hampshire II
- 1996 Warwickshire II
- 1997 Lancashire II
- 1998 Northamptonshire II
- 1999 Middlesex II
- 2000 Middlesex II
- 2001 Hampshire II
- 2002 Kent II
- 2003 Yorkshire II
- 2004 Somerset II
- 2005 Kent II
- 2006 Kent II
- 2007 Sussex II
- 2008 Durham II
- 2009 Surrey II
- 2010 Surrey II
- 2011 Warwickshire II
- 2012 Kent II
- 2013 Lancashire II, Middlesex II (shared)
- 2014 Leicestershire II
- 2015 Nottinghamshire II
- 2016 Durham II
- 2017 Lancashire II
- 2018 Durham II
- 2019 Hampshire II
- 2020 Not held due to COVID-19 pandemic
- 2021 Hampshire II
- 2022 Yorkshire II
- 2023 Leicestershire II
- 2024 Nottinghamshire II
- 2025 Surrey II

== List of Second XI Trophy Winners ==
- 2001 Surrey II
- 2002 Kent II
- 2003 Hampshire II
- 2004 Worcestershire II
- 2005 Sussex II
- 2006 Warwickshire II
- 2007 Middlesex II
- 2008 Hampshire II
- 2009 Yorkshire II
- 2010 Essex II
- 2011 Nottinghamshire II
- 2012 Lancashire II
- 2013 Lancashire II
- 2014 Leicestershire II
- 2015 Derbyshire II
- 2016 Lancashire II
- 2017 Yorkshire II
- 2018 Middlesex II
- 2019 Kent II

== List of Second XI T20 Winners ==
- 2011 Sussex II
- 2012 England U19
- 2013 Surrey II
- 2014 Leicestershire II
- 2015 Middlesex II
- 2016 Middlesex II
- 2017 Sussex II
- 2018 Lancashire II
- 2019 Glamorgan II
- 2021 Warwickshire II
- 2022 Glamorgan II
- 2023 Derbyshire II
- 2024 Somerset II
- 2025 Warwickshire II

== General sources ==
- Playfair Cricket Annual 2007
- Wisden Cricketers' Almanack 2007
