= 1907 English cricket season =

1907 was the 18th season of County Championship cricket in England. Nottinghamshire won their first official title. England played their sixth Test series against South Africa but it was the first to be held in England.

== South African tour ==
This was the fourth South African tour of England following those in 1894, 1901 and 1904. The 1907 tour was the first to feature Test matches between England and South Africa in England, although the teams had played Tests in South Africa since 1888–89. England won the series 1–0 with two matches drawn.

=== Series summary ===
- First Test at Lord's – match drawn
- Second Test at Headingley – England won by 53 runs
- Third Test at The Oval – match drawn

== County Championship ==
	County	Played	Won	Lost	Drawn	Abandoned	Points	Finished Games	%
1	Nottinghamshire	20	15	0	4	1	15	15	100.00
2	Worcestershire	18	8	2	10	0	6	10	60.00
2	Yorkshire	28	12	3	11	2	9	15	60.00
4	Surrey	28	12	4	12	0	8	16	50.00
5	Middlesex	20	8	4	8	1^{[a]}	4	12	33.33
6	Lancashire	26	11	7	6	1^{[a]}	4	18	22.22
7	Essex	22	10	7	5	0	3	17	17.64
8	Kent	26	12	9	5	0	3	21	14.28
9	Warwickshire	20	6	5	8	1	1	11	9.09
10	Gloucestershire	22	8	12	2	0	-4	20	-20.00
11	Leicestershire	20	6	10	4	0	-4	16	-25.00
12	Hampshire	24	6	11	7	0	-5	17	-29.41
13	Sussex	26	7	13	6	0	-6	20	-30.00
14	Somerset	18	3	12	3	0	-9	16	-66.66
15	Northamptonshire	20	2	12	6	0	-10	14	-71.42
16	Derbyshire	22	2	17	1	2	-15	19	-78.94
Details as recorded in John Wisden’s Cricketers’ Almanack.

Points system:

- 1 for a win
- 0 for a draw, a tie or an abandoned match
- -1 for a loss

== Minor Counties Championship ==
An entirely new system of scoring was adopted for the Minor Counties Championship in 1907. With Oxfordshire dropping out and Lincolnshire and Worcestershire Second Eleven coming in, the twenty-one Minor Counties clubs were split into four divisions – North, Midlands, East and West – and a system of semi-finals between division leaders and a final was used to determine the winner.

=== North ===
	County	Played	Won	Won on 1st inns	No result	Possible points	Points obtained	%
1	Lancashire Second Eleven	9	5	3	0	45	34	75.55
2	Staffordshire	9	5	1	0	45	28	62.22
3	Durham	10	3	1	1	45	18	40.00
4	Yorkshire Second Eleven	10	2	2	1	45	16	35.55
5	Lincolnshire	10	3	0	0	50	15	30.00
6	Northumberland	10	1	1	2	40	8	20.00

One match between Lancashire Second Eleven and Staffordshire was abandoned without a ball bowled due to rain.

=== Midlands ===
	County	Played	Won	Won on 1st inns	No result	Possible points	Points obtained	%
1	Surrey Second Eleven	8	6	1	0	40	33	82.50
2	Wiltshire	8	4	1	0	40	23	57.50
3	Berkshire	8	4	1	0	40	19	47.50
4	Buckinghamshire	8	2	0	0	40	10	25.00
5	Worcestershire Second Eleven	8	0	1	0	40	3	7.50

=== East ===
	County	Played	Won	Won on 1st inns	No result	Possible points	Points obtained	%
1	Hertfordshire	8	6	1	0	40	33	75.00
2	Norfolk	8	4	1	0	40	23	57.50
3	Suffolk	8	2	1	1	35	13	37.14
4	Bedfordshire	8	2	1	0	40	13	32.50
5	Cambridgeshire	8	2	0	1	35	10	28.57

=== West ===
	County	Played	Won	Won on 1st inns	No result	Possible points	Points obtained	%
1	Glamorgan	8	6	2	0	40	36	90.00
2	Devon	8	4	0	0	40	20	50.00
3	Dorset	8	2	1	0	40	13	32.50
4	Cornwall	8	1	2	0	40	11	27.50
5	Monmouthshire	8	1	1	0	40	8	20.00

Points system:

- 5 for an outright win
- 3 for a win on the first innings
- 0 for a loss either outright or on the first innings of a drawn match

Matches with no first innings result are ignored when calculating maximum possible points.

=== Semi-finals ===
1. 22 August – Lancashire Second Eleven 263 defeated Hertfordshire 85 and 101 by an innings and 77 runs
2. 29 August – Surrey Second Eleven 198 and 103 lost to Glamorgan 146 and 156 for six wickets by four wickets

=== Final ===
- Lancashire Second Eleven 243 and 121 defeated Glamorgan 74 and 182 by 108 runs.

== Wisden Cricketers of the Year ==
- Albert Hallam, Reginald Schwarz, Frank Tarrant, Bert Vogler, Thomas Wass

== Leading batsmen (qualification 20 innings) ==
1907 English season leading batsmen
Name	Team	Matches	Innings	Not outs	Runs	Highest score	Average	100s	50s
C.B. Fry	Sussex	19	34	3	1449	187	46.74	4	5
“Plum” Warner	Middlesex; MCC	27	47	6	1891	149	46.12	3	13
Tom Hayward	Surrey	34	58	6	2353	161	45.25	7	12
Albert Lawton	Derbyshire; MCC	12	21	1	835	129	41.75	3	4
Geoffrey Foster	Oxford University; Worcestershire	18	33	4	1182	163	40.75	2	6
Henry Foster	Worcestershire; MCC	19	33	3	1127	152	37.56	3	5
Jack Hobbs	Surrey	37	63	6	2135	166 not out	37.45	4	15
Arthur Hill	Hampshire	11	20	1	711	116	37.42	1	5
Percy Perrin	Essex	20	34	2	1194	117	37.31	3	8
Tip Foster	Worcestershire	16	25	1	888	174	37.00	2	4

== Leading bowlers (qualification 1,000 balls) ==
1907 English season leading bowlers
Name	Team	Balls bowled	Runs conceded	Wickets taken	Average	Best bowling	5 wickets in innings	10 wickets in match
Reggie Schwarz	South Africans	4269	1616	137	11.80	7/41	12	2
Albert Hallam	Nottinghamshire	5617	2133	168	12.69	8/67	20	6
Schofield Haigh	Yorkshire	3567	1308	102	12.82	7/13	8	1
Thomas Wass	Nottinghamshire	5316	2328	163	14.28	8/65	17	6
William Huddleston	Lancashire	2715	1092	76	14.36	7/42	7	2
Gordon White	South Africans	1661	824	56	14.71	7/33	3	1
George Hirst	Yorkshire	6831	2799	183	15.29	9/45	17	4
Colin Blythe	Kent	6817	2822	183	15.42	10/30	17	6
Humphrey Gilbert	Oxford University	1714	683	44	15.52	8/48	4	1
Wilfred Rhodes	Yorkshire	6265	2693	173	15.56	6/19	13	2

== Notable events ==
- 1 June – Colin Blythe takes 17 wickets for 48 runs in one day's cricket against Northamptonshire, setting two records:
1. The best bowling analysis in a first-class match, beaten only by Jim Laker when he took nineteen wickets for 90 runs for England against Australia in 1956.
2. The first bowler to take seventeen wickets in a single day – a feat since equalled only by Hedley Verity in 1933 and Tom Goddard in 1939.
- Playing against Gloucestershire at the Spa Ground in June, Northamptonshire were dismissed in their first innings for only 12 runs, which is still the lowest innings total in the history of the County Championship.
- As many as ten pairs of bowlers bowled unchanged throughout two completed innings during a match, the most on record in English cricket history.

== Notes ==
^{a} The match between Middlesex and Lancashire at Lord's was abandoned when it was found the pitch was trampled by impatient spectators.

== Bibliography ==
- H S Altham, A History of Cricket, Volume 1 (to 1914), George Allen & Unwin, 1962
- Bill Frindall, The Wisden Book of Test Cricket 1877-1978, Wisden, 1979
- Sydney H. Pardon (editor), John Wisden’s Cricketers’ Almanack, Forty-Fifth Edition, Wisden, 1908
- Roy Webber, The Playfair Book of Cricket Records, Playfair Books, 1951
