= 1900 English cricket season =

Cricket season review

The 1900 English cricket season featured the 11th edition of the County Championship. Yorkshire finished the season unbeaten to take the championship title and were the first unbeaten champions since the official competition began in 1890. Defending champions Surrey finished seventh. Lancashire were second, and the matches between the two top teams both ended in draws; Yorkshire made 230 in the first innings of the first game, compared to Lancashire's 96, but still could not force a victory, and in the second, with a crowd of over 44,000 present over three days at Old Trafford, Yorkshire took a lead of seven runs on first innings, but as only two and a half hours of play had been possible on the second day, the game was drawn. Sussex, who finished third with 18 of 24 matches drawn, enjoyed 2,000 runs from Ranjitsinhji for the second season running, as he bettered the record for most runs in a Championship season to 2,563. There were no international matches during this season.

== Honours ==
- County Championship – Yorkshire
- Minor Counties Championship – Durham, Glamorgan, Northamptonshire (shared title)
- Wisden Cricketers of the Year (Mr R E Foster and Four Yorkshiremen) – Tip Foster, Schofield Haigh, George Hirst, Tom Taylor, John Tunnicliffe

== County Championship ==
=== Final table ===
The final County Championship table is shown below. One point was awarded for a win, none for a draw, and minus one for a loss. Positions were decided on percentage of points over completed games.

County Championship 1900 - Final Standings
	Team	P	W	L	D	Pts	GC^{1}	Pts/GC (as %)
1	Yorkshire	28	16	0	12	16	16	100.00
2	Lancashire	28	15	2	11	13	17	76.47
3	Kent	22	8	4	10	4	12	33.33
3	Sussex	24	4	2	18	2	6	33.33
5	Nottinghamshire	18	7	4	7	3	11	27.27
6	Warwickshire	18	3	2	13	1	5	20.00
7	Gloucestershire	22	9	7	6	2	16	12.50
7	Middlesex	22	9	7	6	2	16	12.50
7	Surrey	28	9	7	12	2	16	12.50
10	Essex	22	4	6	12	-2	10	-20.00
11	Somerset	16	4	11	1	-7	15	-46.67
12	Worcestershire	22	3	10	9	-7	13	-53.85
13	Derbyshire	18	2	7	9	-5	9	-55.56
14	Leicestershire	22	3	11	8	-8	14	-57.14
15	Hampshire	22	0	16	6	-16	16	-100.00

- ^{1} Games completed

Points system:

- 1 for a win
- 0 for a draw, a tie or an abandoned match
- -1 for a loss

=== Most runs in the County Championship ===
1900 County Championship - leading batsmen
Name	Team	Matches	Runs	Average	100s	50s
Ranjitsinhji	Sussex	22	2563	85.43	9	9
Bobby Abel	Surrey	22	1880	58.75	10	3
Tom Hayward	Surrey	28	1850	50.00	6	8
C. B. Fry	Sussex	20	1830	63.10	9	4
Gilbert Jessop	Gloucestershire	22	1733	44.43	5	11

=== Most wickets in the County Championship ===
1900 County Championship - leading bowlers
Name	Team	Matches	Balls bowled	Wickets taken	Average
Wilfred Rhodes	Yorkshire	26	6973	206	12.29
Albert Trott	Middlesex	22	6261	154	19.85
Schofield Haigh	Yorkshire	28	4954	145	14.16
Walter Mead	Essex	22	5323	122	15.45
Johnny Briggs	Lancashire	27	6699	120	17.45

== Overall first-class statistics ==
=== Leading batsmen ===
1900 English cricket season - leading batsmen
Name	Team(s)	Matches	Runs	Average	100s	50s
Ranjitsinhji	Sussex	26	3065	87.57	11	10
Tom Hayward	Players, South of England, Surrey	38	2693	53.86	10	11
Bobby Abel	Players, South of England, Surrey	31	2592	56.34	12	7
C. B. Fry	Gentlemen, London County, Marylebone Cricket Club (MCC), Sussex	26	2325	61.18	9	9
Gilbert Jessop	Gentlemen, Gloucestershire, London County, South of England	31	2210	40.18	6	13

=== Leading bowlers ===
1900 English cricket season - leading bowlers
Name	Team(s)	Matches	Balls bowled	Wickets taken	Average
Wilfred Rhodes	North of England, Players, Yorkshire	35	9300	261	13.81
Albert Trott	London County, Marylebone Cricket Club (MCC), Middlesex, Players, South of England	36	9182	211	23.33
Schofield Haigh	Players, Yorkshire	33	5751	163	14.82
Fred Tate	Sussex	30	6863	141	21.53
J. T. Hearne	Marylebone Cricket Club (MCC), Middlesex, Players	29	6646	135	21.05

== Annual reviews ==
- Wisden Cricketers' Almanack 1901
