= Cricketer of the Year =

Cricketer of Year may refer to:

- Any of the ICC Awards:
  - Sir Garfield Sobers Trophy - Overall ICC Player of the Year
  - ICC Women's Cricketer of the Year
  - ICC Test Player of the Year
  - ICC ODI Player of the Year
  - T20 Player of the Year
  - Captain of the Year
  - Emerging Player of the Year
- Wisden Cricketers of the Year
- Cricket Writers' Club Young Cricketer of the Year
- PCA Player of the Year, the best of the year in English county cricket
- Wisden Australia's Cricketer of the Year
- Young Wisden Schools Cricketer of the Year
