= Arthur Turner (British Army officer) =

British Army Brigadier, cricketer & rugby union player

Brigadier-General Arthur Turner CB CMG DSO
- Born: Arthur Jervois Turner; 10 June 1878; United Provinces, British India
- Died: 8 September 1952 (aged 74); Graffham, Sussex, England
- Cricket career

Cricket information
- Batting: Right-handed
- Bowling: Right-arm medium
- Role: Batsman

Domestic team information
- Years: Team
- 1893–1896: Bedfordshire
- 1897–1910: Essex
- 1898: Gentlemen
- 1899–1909: South of England
- 1899: Home Counties
- 1909: Gentlemen of the South
- 1911: Army and Navy
- 1913–1914: Army
- 1914: Free Foresters
- FC debut: 24 June 1897 Essex v Hampshire
- Last FC: 11 June 1914 Army v Cambridge University

Career statistics
Competition	First-class
Matches	77
Runs scored	4,053
Batting average	34.05
100s/50s	11/15
Top score	124
Balls bowled	827
Wickets	15
Bowling average	32.26
5 wickets in innings	0
10 wickets in match	0
Best bowling	3/47
Catches/stumpings	31/2
- Source: CricketArchive, 26 April 2008

Brigadier-General Arthur Jervois Turner, CB, CMG, DSO (10 June 1878 – 8 September 1952) was British Army officer and an English cricketer and rugby union player. A right-handed batsman, right-arm underarm medium pace bowler and occasional wicket-keeper, he played first-class cricket for various teams between 1897 and 1914, predominately for Essex. He also played for the Egypt national cricket team. His other sporting interests included Rugby Union, and he played for Blackheath F.C. and Kent at that sport.

== Personal life ==
Born in the United Provinces of Agra and Oudh in 1878, Arthur Turner was the son of a JT Turner, who played cricket for Hong Kong and died on the SS Bokhara on the way back from playing a match for Hong Kong against Shanghai.

His younger brother Walter also played cricket for Essex, whilst another brother John played first-class cricket in India, as did his nephew Antony.

He was educated at Bedford Modern School, gaining a place in the school's cricket team when aged 13. He played four seasons for the school, captaining them in 1895.

Arthur married Maud Mary Lee Walton in 1912, his wife died 6 months later, he never remarried. He died in Sussex in 1952 and was buried alongside her and some of her family at St Andrew's Church, Church Ln, London NW9 8SX.

== Cricket career ==
After gaining a reputation as a cricketer at school and with the Army, Turner played occasionally for Bedfordshire before making his first-class debut for Essex in a County Championship match against Hampshire in June 1897.

He played nine further County Championship matches for Essex that season and a dozen in the 1898 season, also playing in that year's Gentlemen v Players match at The Oval. He played ten County Championship matches in 1899, also playing twice against Australia – once for Essex and once for the South of England. He also played for a Home Counties team against the Rest of England and was invited to play in that year's Gentlemen v Players match at Lord's but could not accept the invitation due to military duties.

He played no first-class cricket in 1900 or 1902, playing eight County Championship matches for Essex during the 1901 season. His appearances for Essex became more sporadic from this point, playing just twice in 1903, seven times in 1904, five times in 1905 and just once in 1906.

After missing the 1907 season, he played four County Championship matches for Essex in 1908, also playing for the British Army cricket team against the Navy at Lord's and for the Royal Artillery against Philadelphia that season.

He played just two County Championship matches in 1909, also playing for Essex and the South of England against Australia and for the Gentlemen of the South against the Players of the South. His final matches for Essex were in the 1910 season, playing five times for them in the County Championship, his last match coming against Yorkshire in August.

He still played four more first-class matches, playing for a combined Army/Navy team against a combined Oxford/Cambridge University team in 1911, for the Army against the Navy in 1913 and for the Free Foresters against Oxford University and for the Army against Cambridge University in 1914.

He played no more first-class cricket after World War I, though he continued to play cricket at a minor level. He played for the Army against a Public Schools team in 1920, and for the Royal Artillery against West Kent in 1925.

In 1929, he played a match for Egypt against HM Martineau's XI in Cairo and his last recorded match was for the Army against the West Indies in May 1939 when he was 60.

=== Statistics ===
In his 77 first-class matches, Arthur Turner scored 4053 runs at an average of 34.05, including eleven centuries. His highest score was 124 for Essex against Warwickshire in 1899. Whilst he was considered an all-rounder at school, Turner's underarm bowling was rarely used at first-class level. In all he took fifteen first-class wickets, with a best innings bowling performance of 3/47 for Essex against Lancashire in 1898. After taking 14 wickets in his first three seasons, he took only one more first-class wicket in his career.

== Military career ==
Turner was commissioned a second-lieutenant in the Royal Artillery on 23 December 1897. He served in the Second Boer War in South Africa (1899–1900), where he was promoted to lieutenant on 23 December 1900, was severely wounded and mentioned in despatches. He returned to serve in South Africa in 1902, and received a substantive commission as lieutenant in the Royal Field Artillery on 26 March 1902, attached to the 61st Battery. Following the end of the war, he returned home with the men of his battery on the SS Sicilia in October 1902, when the battery was posted at Woolwich.

He later served in France during the First World War and was decorated with the Croix de Guerre. He was also decorated with the Distinguished Service Order (DSO), appointed a Companion of the Order of St Michael and St George (CMG) and a Companion of the Order of the Bath (CB). He achieved the rank of brigadier general, in June 1918.
