= 1898 County Championship =

English cricket tournament

- Cricket format: First-class cricket (3 days)
- Tournament format: League system
- Champions: Yorkshire (3rd title)
- Participants: 14
- Matches: 138
- Most runs: Bobby Abel (1,832 for Surrey)
- Most wickets: Charlie Townsend (130 for Gloucestershire)

The 1898 County Championship was the ninth officially organised running of the County Championship, and ran from 9 May to 3 September 1898. Yorkshire County Cricket Club won their third championship title, with Middlesex finishing as runners-up for the first time.

In April, John Tunnicliffe and Jack Brown of Yorkshire, set a then-record partnership for any wicket of 554, against Derbyshire at Queen's Park, Chesterfield.

== Table ==
- One point was awarded for a win, and one point was taken away for each loss. Final placings were decided by dividing the number of points earned by the number of completed matches (i.e., those that ended in a win or a loss) and multiplying by 100.

Team	Pld	W	L	D	A	Pts	Fin	%Fin
Yorkshire	26	16	3	7	0	13	19	68.42
Middlesex	18	10	3	5	0	7	13	53.85
Gloucestershire	20	9	3	8	0	6	12	50.00
Surrey	26	11	4	9	2	7	15	46.67
Essex	20	10	6	4	0	4	16	25.00
Lancashire	26	9	6	11	0	3	15	20.00
Kent	20	5	6	9	0	–1	11	–9.09
Nottinghamshire	16	1	2	13	0	–1	3	–33.33
Derbyshire	16	2	6	7	1	–4	8	–50.00
Sussex	20	3	9	8	0	–6	12	–50.00
Warwickshire	18	2	6	9	1	–4	8	–50.00
Hampshire	18	2	8	8	0	–6	10	–60.00
Leicestershire	16	1	10	5	0	–9	11	–81.82
Somerset	16	1	10	5	0	–9	11	–81.82
Source: CricketArchive

== Records ==
Most runs
Aggregate	Average	Player	County
1,832	57.25	Bobby Abel	Surrey
1,801	39.15	Johnny Tyldesley	Lancashire
1,604	59.40	C. B. Fry	Sussex
1,538	46.60	John Tunnicliffe	Yorkshire
1,468	43.17	Bill Brockwell	Surrey

Most wickets
Aggregate	Average	Player	County
130	20.00	Charlie Townsend	Gloucestershire
126	13.84	Wilfred Rhodes	Yorkshire
126	21.29	Tom Richardson	Surrey
125	14.76	Jack Hearne	Middlesex
109	17.06	William Lockwood	Surrey
