= Antony Turner (cricketer) =

English cricketer and soldier

Personal information
- Full name: Antony James Dillon Turner
- Born: 19 September 1907; Abbottabad, North-West Frontier Province, British India
- Died: 4 October 1959 (aged 52); Accra, Ghana
- Batting: Unknown
- Bowling: Unknown
- Relatives: Walter Turner (father); Arthur Turner (uncle); John Turner (uncle)

Domestic team information
- Years: Team
- 1936/37: Europeans

Career statistics
Competition	First-class
Matches	1
Runs scored	43
Batting average	21.50
100s/50s	–/–
Top score	42
Balls bowled	108
Wickets	0
Bowling average	–
5 wickets in innings	–
10 wickets in match	–
Best bowling	–
Catches/stumpings	–/–
- Source: ESPNcricinfo, 2 December 2023

Antony James Dillon Turner DSO MC (19 September 1907 – 4 October 1959) was an English first-class cricketer and an officer in the British Army.

== Life and military career ==
The son of the cricketer Walter Turner, he was born in British India at Abbottabad in September 1907. He attended the Royal Military College at Sandhurst, graduating from there into the Suffolk Regiment as a second lieutenant in February 1928, with promotion to lieutenant following in February 1931. In September 1932, he was seconded for service with the Colonial Office and proceeded to serve in the Sierra Leone Battalion of the Royal West African Frontier Force. He was restored to the Suffolk Regiment in February 1935, before being seconded to serve on the staff in India in February 1936. In India, Turner made a single appearance in first-class cricket for the Europeans cricket team against the Indians at Madras in the 1936–37 Madras Presidency Match. Batting twice in the match, he was dismissed for 42 runs in the Europeans first innings by M. J. Gopalan, while in their second innings he was dismissed for a single run by A. G. Ram Singh. With the ball, he bowled 18 wicketless overs.

Turner was promoted to captain in May 1936, before returning to England to attend the Staff College in January 1938. Prior to the Second World War, he was appointed a staff captain at Aldershot Garrison in February 1939. He served in the war and was awarded the Military Cross in August 1940. He later commanded the 6th Battalion, Duke of Wellington's Regiment during the Normandy campaign, but was relieved from his command after requesting that his battalion rest and refit. He was promoted to major in February 1945, having previously held the war substantive rank. Later in the same month, he was made a Companion of the Distinguished Service Order. Turner remained in the military following the war, with a further promotion to lieutenant colonel following in November 1949. He was promoted to colonel in January 1951, and was made commanding officer of the 151st Infantry Brigade. He was later promoted to brigadier in January 1957, while serving as a deputy adjutant general with the Middle East Land Forces.

Turner retired from active service in May 1958. He was resident between Worth in Sussex and Accra in Ghana. He died in Accra in October 1959. His uncles, Arthur and John Turner, were both first-class cricketers.
