= John T. Brown (disambiguation) =

John T. Brown (1876–1951) was the lieutenant governor of Ohio. John T. Brown may also refer to:

- John Thomas Brown (footballer, born 1901) (1901–1977), English footballer for Leicester City and Wrexham
- John Thomas Brown (footballer, born 1935) (1935–2000), Scottish football player
- John Thomas "Jack" Brown (1869–1904), English cricketer
- John Thomas Brown (cricketer, born 1874) (1874–1950), English cricketer
- John Thomas "J. T." Brown (musician) (1918–1969), American tenor saxophonist of the Chicago blues era
- John Thomas Brown (politician) (1857–1942), mayor of Fort Worth, Texas

== See also ==
- John T. Browne (1845–1941), American merchant and politician
