= Percy Adams =

Percy Adams may refer to:

- Percy Adams (cricketer) (1900–1962), English cricketer
- Henry Percy Adams (1865–1930), English architect
