= Tom Hayward =

English cricketer

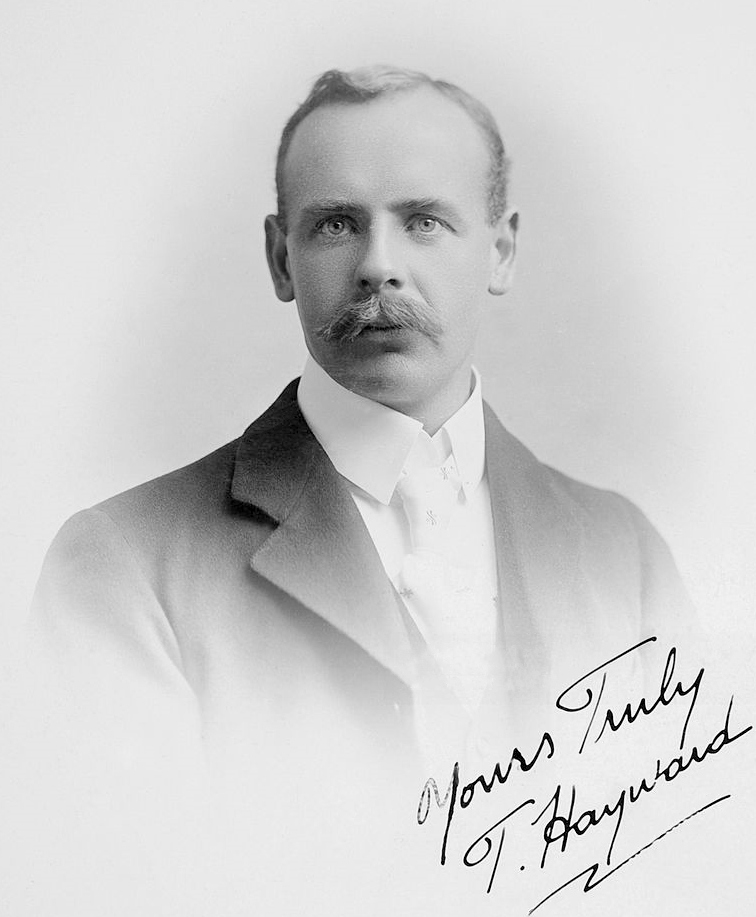
- Hayward in about 1899

Personal information
- Full name: Thomas Walter Hayward
- Born: 29 March 1871; Cambridge, England
- Died: 19 July 1939 (aged 68); Cambridge, England
- Batting: Right-handed
- Bowling: Right-arm medium

International information
- National side: England
- Test debut: 13 February 1896 v South Africa
- Last Test: 16 June 1909 v Australia

Career statistics
Competition	Test	First-class
Matches	35	712
Runs scored	1,999	43,551
Batting average	34.46	41.79
100s/50s	3/12	104/218
Top score	137	315*
Balls bowled	893	20,992
Wickets	14	481
Bowling average	36.71	22.95
5 wickets in innings	0	18
10 wickets in match	0	2
Best bowling	4/22	8/89
Catches/stumpings	19/–	493/–
- Source: CricInfo, 6 December 2019

Thomas Walter Hayward (29 March 1871 – 19 July 1939) was an English first-class cricketer who played for Surrey and England between the 1890s and the outbreak of World War I. He was primarily an opening batsman, noted especially for the quality of his off-drive. Neville Cardus wrote that he "was amongst the most precisely technical and most prolific batsmen of any time in the annals of cricket." He was only the second batsman to reach the landmark of 100 first-class centuries, following WG Grace. In the 1906 English season he scored 3,518 runs, a record aggregate since surpassed only by Denis Compton and Bill Edrich in 1947.

== Career ==
Born on 29 March 1871 in Cambridge, Hayward came from a cricketing family: his grandfather, father and uncle had all played first-class cricket. Hayward himself made his debut for Surrey in 1893 and quickly established himself as an important part of the side, being capped in 1894 and receiving the accolade of Wisden Cricketer of the Year the following season. Although primarily a batsman, Hayward took 481 wickets in first class cricket, taking 114 in the 1897 season. GL Jessop referred to him as an awkward bowler, who bowled wide of the crease and achieved unexpected nip off the wicket that seduced the unwary batsman into an injudicious stroke.

From 1895 through to his final season in 1914, Hayward never once failed to reach 1,000 first-class runs, passing 2,000 on ten occasions and twice (in 1904 and 1906) scoring over 3,000; his 1906 aggregate of 3,518 (at 66.37 with 13 hundreds) established a record which stood until surpassed by Denis Compton and Bill Edrich in 1947. In 1898 he made his highest first-class score of 315 against Lancashire. In 1899 he and Bobby Abel put on 448 for Surrey's fourth wicket against Yorkshire. This remains the highest partnership for any wicket for Surrey. In 1900 he achieved the very rare feat of scoring 1,000 runs before the end of May.

Hayward's first Test match for England came on tour with Lord Hawke's side against South Africa at Port Elizabeth in 1895/96, and in his second Test (at Johannesburg) he hit 122 as England recorded an innings victory. In all, he played 35 times for England scoring three hundreds. In his last innings, coming against Australia in 1909, he was run out for six to finish just one run short of 2,000 for his Test career. He scored 130 at Old Trafford in the fourth Test of the 1899 Ashes series, batting at number six. He came in at 47 for 4 and enabled the final total to reach 372. It was described as "one of the great Test innings" by Ralph Barker. He followed that up in the fifth Test, at The Oval, with 137, putting on 185 for the first wicket with FS Jackson. He headed the batting averages for both sides in this series, in seven innings scoring 413 runs at 68.83.

Once Jack Hobbs made his Surrey debut in 1905, he and Hayward formed an effective opening partnership for the county. The pair put on a hundred or more for the first wicket on 40 occasions. They only played together once for England, opening the innings when Hayward was recalled for what was to prove his final Test, at Lord's in 1909.

Despite a gradual decline in his athleticism in his later career, Hayward remained an effective batsman well into his forties, and in June 1913 he scored his hundredth first-class century, becoming only the second batsman (after W. G. Grace) to achieve this feat. He made his 104th and final hundred in August 1914 against Yorkshire at Lord's (where Surrey played several "home" matches after World War I had begun), but made just one in his last innings of all, against Gloucestershire back at The Oval and on grounds of age did not resume his career after the end of hostilities. Surrey won the County Championship in his final season. Hayward had the rare honour for a professional of the time of captaining the side for six matches in August when the regular captain, Cyril Wilkinson, was unavailable, in preference to the young amateurs Donald Knight and Percy Fender.

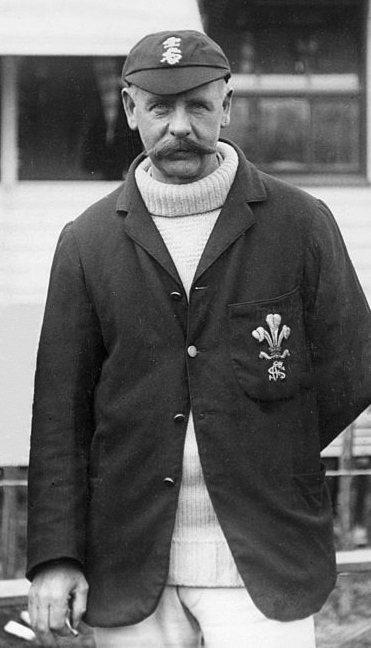
Hayward in 1926

Although primarily known as a batsman, Hayward was also an effective bowler for his county in the middle of his career. In 1897 he did the "double", with 1,368 runs and 114 wickets, and in 1899 he took two hat-tricks. His best bowling of 8–89 was achieved against Warwickshire at Edgbaston in 1901.

Hayward was respected as a model professional. Of his final years with Surrey, David Lemmon wrote: "He was the senior professional in all aspects, setting down standards of behaviour which others violated at their peril. He led by bearing and by example."

He stood in one first-class match as an umpire, the 1920 game between Oxford University and Essex. He died on 19 July 1939 in Cambridge at the age of 68.
