= Alexander Lorrimer =

English cricketer

Personal information
- Full name: Alexander Lorrimer
- Born: 6 January 1859; Leicester, England
- Died: 2 February 1947 (aged 88); Oadby, Leicestershire, England
- Batting: Right-handed
- Relatives: David Lorrimer (brother)

Domestic team information
- Years: Team
- 1894–1896: Leicestershire

Career statistics
Competition	First-class
Matches	6
Runs scored	174
Batting average	14.50
100s/50s	–/–
Top score	46
Balls bowled	–
Wickets	–
Bowling average	–
5 wickets in innings	–
10 wickets in match	–
Best bowling	–
Catches/stumpings	3/–
- Source: Cricinfo, 28 February 2012

Alexander Lorrimer (9 January 1859 – 2 January 1947) was an English cricketer. Lorrimer was a right-handed batsman. He was born at Leicester.

Lorrimer made his first-class debut for Leicestershire against Warwickshire in 1894 at Grace Road (a match in which his brother, David, also made his first-class debut). He made five further first-class appearances for the county, the last of which came against Derbyshire in the 1896 County Championship. In his six matches he scored 174 runs at an average of 14.50, with a high score of 46.

He died at Oadby, Leicestershire, on 2 January 1947.
