= John Gunn (cricketer) =

English cricketer

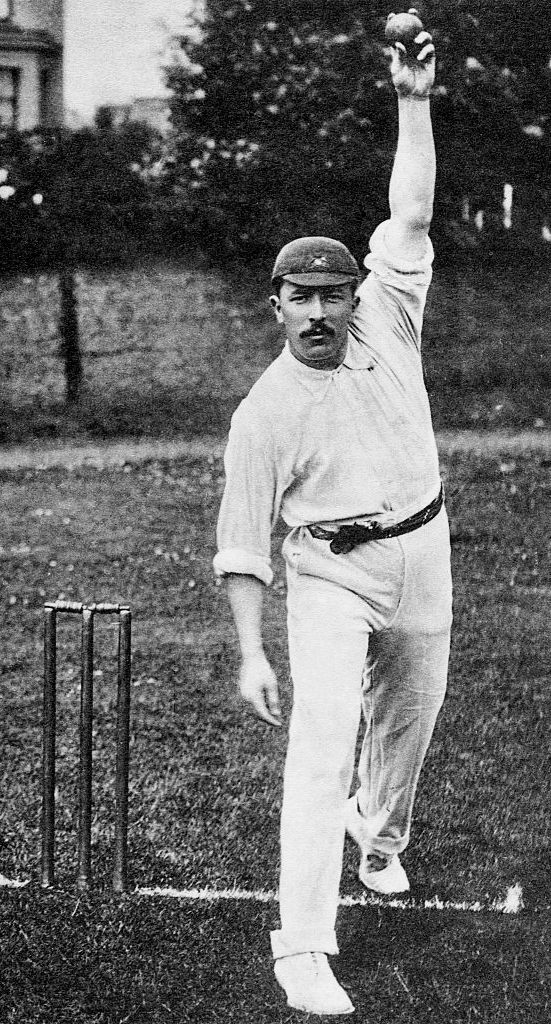

Personal information
- Born: 19 July 1876; Hucknall, Nottinghamshire, England
- Died: 21 August 1963 (aged 87); Basford, Nottinghamshire, England
- Batting: Left-handed
- Bowling: Slow medium

International information
- National side: England
- Test debut: 13 December 1901 v Australia
- Last Test: 29 May 1905 v Australia

Career statistics
| Competition | Test | First-class |
|---|---|---|
| Matches | 6 | 535 |
| Runs scored | 85 | 24,557 |
| Batting average | 10.62 | 33.18 |
| 100s/50s | 0/0 | 40/129 |
| Top score | 24 | 294 |
| Balls bowled | 999 | 68,269 |
| Wickets | 18 | 1,242 |
| Bowling average | 21.50 | 24.52 |
| 5 wickets in innings | 1 | 82 |
| 10 wickets in match | 0 | 17 |
| Best bowling | 5/76 | 8/63 |
| Catches/stumpings | 3/– | 247/– |
- Source: CricInfo, 5 August 2020

John Richmond Gunn (19 July 1876 – 21 August 1963) was an English cricketer who played in six Test matches from 1901 to 1905.

A nephew of the then-famous batsman William Gunn, John Gunn first played for Nottinghamshire when only twenty. The following year John Gunn scored 107 against the Philadelphians in his third first-class match and took ten wickets against Yorkshire in his fourth. With William Attewell desperately needing support to improve Nottinghamshire's deplorably weak bowling, Gunn was seen as a boon but he but did so little after the Yorkshire game that he could not establish a place in the team. 1898, strangely, was a repeat of the previous year with one bowling performance against Yorkshire overshadowing everything else.

1899, with the decline of Attewell, saw John Gunn establish himself as Nottinghamshire's chief bowler, though he faded late in the season. 1900, however, saw him and Thomas Wass restore Nottinghamshire's bowling to reasonable strength for the first time since the early 1890s. He took eleven wickets for the Players against the Gentlemen at the Oval. He also advanced as a batsman with six scores of over fifty, and the following season, though he never played a bigger innings than 87, scored 1,000 runs for the first time and bowled, considering the unfavourable pitches, exceedingly well. In those days Gunn was a left hand medium pace bowler who relied on the ball that went in from off to leg, which allowed him to nag away at batsmen very well on good pitches but could not break-back on a sticky wicket like Rhodes, Blythe, Briggs or Hargreave. It was because of this that Gunn was chosen for the Ashes tour of 1901/1902 when Yorkshire refused to let Rhodes go – apparently because they feared it would affect his performance the following season.

The effects of the tour hit hard on Gunn in 1902 and he was very disappointing with both bat and ball apart from a few good bowling performances. The following year, though, bowling in a slower style, he had his finest season ever and was momentarily second as an all-rounder to Hirst. In the process, on a featherbed wicket at Trent Bridge, he hit 294 against Leicestershire, which was amazingly his first century since his third first-class match! As a bowler, Gunn took 28 wickets in two games against Surrey and Essex during the August Bank Holiday week. He was named a Cricketer of the Year by Wisden for 1904, but the following three years were not quite up to the standard set in 1903 – though he bowled wonderfully against Essex in 1905 on a perfect pitch. In 1906 Gunn again changed his style, bowling very slowly and tossing the ball up, with barely improved success.

1907 was a year of quite incredible triumph for Nottinghamshire, but for John Gunn it was an anticlimax. Wass and Hallam accomplished the most amazing run of bowling triumphs in the history of the competition, and Gunn bowled only 281 overs in 17 matches. Only against Essex and the South African touring team did Gunn have to do serious bowling. In batting, too, he was overshadowed by his younger brother George and failed to reach 1,000 runs despite a century against Sussex.

Unexpectedly, the lack of practice in 1907 affected his bowling severely when Wass and Hallam failed to repeat their 1907 form in the following two seasons. Indeed, by 1909 John Gunn was clearly no more than an occasional bowler – he had taken only 42 wickets for 30 each in 1908 and 1909 – besides failing to recover his batting form. In the extremely dry summer of 1911, he was back in form as a batsman, but though called upon to bowl a good deal he was never formidable and always expensive. Nonetheless, his batting remained a major force right up to the early 1920s: he averaged over 40 in 1911, 1913, 1914, 1919 and 1920 and was at times the side's outstanding batsman. After this, time gradually took its toll and Gunn dropped out of the Nottinghamshire side after a few matches in 1925. He did play for Sir Julien Cahn's XI after this time, scoring 139 in one match against Essex in 1930, and featuring for the team until at least the age of fifty-six.
