= William Brown (cricketer, born 1876) =

English cricketer

William Brown (19 November 1876 – 27 July 1945) was an English first-class cricketer, who played two matches for Yorkshire County Cricket Club, against Sussex at the County Cricket Ground, Hove in 1902, and against Ireland in Dublin in 1908.

Born in Snape Hill, Darfield, Yorkshire, England, Brown was a right arm fast bowler, who took four wickets at 21 each, with a best of 3 for 61 on debut. A right-handed tail ender, he scored two runs in total. He also played for the Yorkshire Second XI from 1902 to 1909, Yorkshire Colts in 1902, Northallerton and District in 1903 and RW Frank's XI at Headingley in 1906.

His brother, John Brown, played thirty games for Yorkshire.

He died at the age of 68, in July 1945 in Barnsley.
