= David Lorrimer =

English cricketer

Personal information
- Full name: David Lorrimer
- Born: 16 January 1865; Leicester, England
- Died: 12 November 1925 (aged 60); Boscombe, Hampshire, England
- Batting: Right-handed
- Relatives: Alexander Lorrimer (brother)

Domestic team information
- Years: Team
- 1894–1895: Leicestershire

Career statistics
Competition	First-class
Matches	9
Runs scored	194
Batting average	12.12
100s/50s	–/–
Top score	46
Balls bowled	–
Wickets	–
Bowling average	–
5 wickets in innings	–
10 wickets in match	–
Best bowling	–
Catches/stumpings	6/–
- Source: Cricinfo, 29 February 2012

David Lorrimer (16 January 1865 – 12 November 1925) was an English cricketer. Lorrimer was a right-handed batsman. He was born at Leicester.

Lorrimer made his first-class debut for Leicestershire against Warwickshire in 1894 at Grace Road (a match in which his brother, Alexander, also made his first-class debut). He made eight further first-class appearances for the county, the last of which came against Dublin University in 1895. In his nine matches he scored 194 runs at an average of 12.12, with a high score of 46.

He died at Boscombe, Hampshire, on 12 November 1925.
