= John Turner (cricketer, born 1879) =

Scottish cricketer and educator (1879–1963)

Personal information
- Full name: John Trench Turner
- Born: 24 December 1879; Meerut, North-Western Provinces, British India
- Died: 15 April 1963 (aged 83); Berkhamsted, Hertfordshire, England
- Batting: Unknown
- Bowling: Unknown
- Relatives: Arthur Turner (brother); Walter Turner (brother)

Domestic team information
- Years: Team
- 1905/06–1908/09: Europeans

Career statistics
Competition	First-class
Matches	7
Runs scored	254
Batting average	19.53
100s/50s	–/1
Top score	54
Balls bowled	518
Wickets	7
Bowling average	32.00
5 wickets in innings	–
10 wickets in match	–
Best bowling	3/11
Catches/stumpings	–/–
- Source: ESPNcricinfo, 12 December 2022

John Trench Turner (24 December 1879 — 15 April 1963) was an English first-class cricketer, educator and British Indian Army officer.

The son of the Scottish soldier James Trench Turner, he was born in British India at Meerut. Turner was educated in Scotland at Fettes College, before matriculating to Clare College, Cambridge. At Cambridge he played both rugby union and field hockey. After graduating from Cambridge, he became an assistant master at Oakham School from 1902 to 1905. From there, he returned to British India and joined the Indian Education Service. He was appointed headmaster of the High School of Poona in 1905, an appointment he held until the following year. Shortly after his arrival in India, Turner made his debut in first-class cricket for the Europeans cricket team against the Hindus at Bombay in the 1905–06 Bombay Presidency Match. He played first-class cricket until 1908, making a total of seven appearances in the Bombay Presidency Matches. He scored 254 runs at an average of 19.53; he made a single half century with a highest score of 54. With the ball, he took 7 wickets at a bowling average of exactly 32 and best figures of 3 for 11. Turner was appointed vice-principal of Rajkumar College, Rajkot in 1906.

Turner served in the First World War, being commissioned into the Cavalry Branch of the British Indian Army Reserve as a second lieutenant in April 1915. He was promoted to lieutenant in December 1915 while appointed to the 28th Light Cavalry, with him later serving as second-in-command of the Zhob Cavalry from 1917 to 1918. After the war, he resumed his post at Rajkumar College and was appointed headmaster there from 1923 to 1930. It was in 1930 that he was appointed to be the personal tutor to the heir apparent of the Mysore Wadiyar dynasty, Jayachamarajendra Wadiyar. Turner later retired to England, where he died at Berkhamsted in April 1963. His brothers, Arthur and Walter, both played first-class cricket.
