= 1896 County Championship =

English cricket tournament

- Cricket format: First-class cricket (3 days)
- Tournament format: League system
- Champions: Yorkshire (2nd title)
- Participants: 14
- Matches: 126
- Most runs: Kumar Shri Ranjitsinhji (1,698 for Sussex)
- Most wickets: Tom Richardson (191 for Surrey)

The 1896 County Championship was the seventh officially organised running of the County Championship, and ran from 4 May to 31 August 1896. Yorkshire County Cricket Club claimed victory that year, winning 16 of their 26 matches and losing only three. Five of Yorkshire's players made over 1,000 runs in the season, including John Brown who was placed third nationally, while Yorkshireman Bobby Peel was sixth highest wicket taker and Schofield Haigh held one of the leading bowling averages. Although Yorkshire had a crop of players accruing these statistics, Kumar Shri Ranjitsinhji of Sussex took the plaudits for the most runs that year, 1,698, at the highest average, 58.55, while Surrey's Tom Richardson took the most wickets – 191, and William Attewell of Nottinghamshire returned the best average – 14.63 for his 87 wickets.

== Highlights ==
The highest team total during 1896 was 887, made by Yorkshire against Warwickshire at Edgbaston, composed of centuries from Stanley Jackson (117), Ted Wainwright (136), Bobby Peel (210*) and Lord Hawke (166). The latter two were both career bests. In contrast, the lowest team total was 45 when Surrey were routed by only two Middlesex bowlers. WG Grace's 301 against Sussex was the highest score of the season, while there were three hat-tricks for Richardson, Jack Hearne and Walter Mead. Richardson also took the season's best match figures, 15/113 against Leicestershire, while Mead took 9/75 – the best innings figures of the season.

== Table ==
- One point was awarded for a win, and one point was taken away for each loss. Final placings were decided by dividing the number of points earned by the number of completed matches (i.e. those that ended in win or loss), and multiplying by 100.

Team	Pld	W	T	L	D	A	Pts	Fin	%Fin
Yorkshire	26	16	0	3	7	0	13	19	68.42
Lancashire	22	11	0	4	7	0	7	15	46.67
Middlesex	16	8	0	3	5	0	5	11	45.45
Surrey	26	17	0	7	2	0	10	24	41.67
Essex	12	5	0	4	3	0	1	9	11.11
Nottinghamshire	16	5	0	5	6	0	0	10	0.00
Derbyshire	16	4	0	6	6	0	−2	10	–20.00
Hampshire	16	5	0	8	3	0	−3	13	–23.07
Kent	18	5	0	9	4	0	−4	14	–28.57
Gloucestershire	18	5	0	10	3	0	−5	15	–33.33
Somerset	16	3	0	7	6	0	−4	10	–40.00
Warwickshire	18	3	0	8	7	0	−5	11	–45.45
Leicestershire	14	2	0	8	4	0	−6	10	–60.00
Sussex	18	2	0	9	7	0	−7	11	–63.64

== Leading averages ==
Most runs
Aggregate	Average	Player	County
1,698	58.55	Kumar Shri Ranjitsinhji	Sussex
1,565	53.96	WG Grace	Gloucestershire
1,556	45.76	John Brown	Yorkshire
1,520	42.22	Bobby Abel	Surrey
1,278	39.93	Frank Sugg	Lancashire

Most wickets
Aggregate	Average	Player	County
191	15.46	Tom Richardson	Surrey
130	17.20	Arthur Mold	Lancashire
122	19.77	Johnny Briggs	Lancashire
118	17.95	Jack Hearne	Middlesex
101	21.84	Charlie Townsend	Gloucestershire
