= Willis Cuttell =

English cricketer

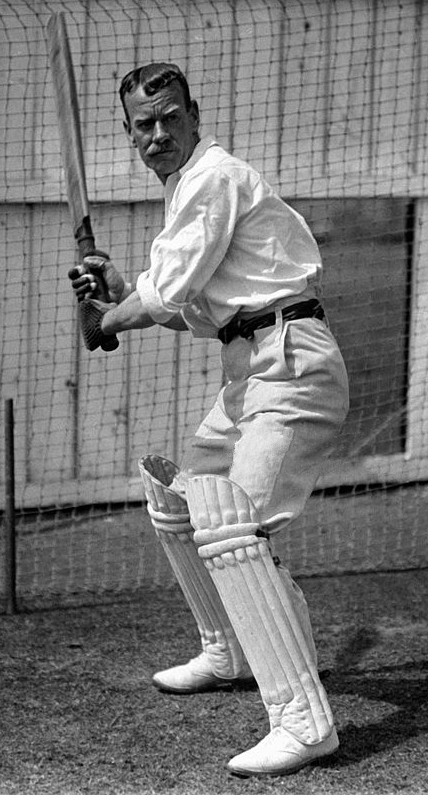

Personal information
- Born: 13 September 1863; Sheffield, Yorkshire
- Died: 9 December 1929 (aged 66); Nelson, Lancashire
- Batting: Right-handed
- Bowling: Right-arm slow

International information
- National side: England
- Test debut: 14 February 1899 v South Africa
- Last Test: 1 April 1899 v South Africa

Career statistics
Competition	Test	First-class
Matches	2	227
Runs scored	65	5,938
Batting average	16.25	20.90
100s/50s	0/0	5/21
Top score	21	137
Balls bowled	285	44,372
Wickets	6	792
Bowling average	12.16	19.59
5 wickets in innings	0	50
10 wickets in match	0	8
Best bowling	3/17	8/105
Catches/stumpings	2/–	141/–
- Source: ESPNcricinfo, 6 November 2022

Willis Robert Cuttell (13 September 1863 – 9 December 1929) was an English cricketer. Along with Albert Hallam, his support for Briggs and Mold gave Lancashire its first official County championship victory in 1897. His bowling was also important to Lancashire's Championship win seven years later, in which they went through the whole season without being beaten.

Cuttell was a slow right-arm bowler who possessed the unusual ability to turn the ball from leg without throwing it up enough to encourage risk-taking batsmen to attack him. He was very accurate in length and also possessed the characteristic break-back of most bowlers of his time, which made him as unplayable as any bowler when the pitch helped him.

He was very slow to move into first-class cricket. Cuttell's early cricket was played for the Accrington Club in the Lancashire League. Having been born in Yorkshire and his father William Cuttell having played for them in the 1860s, he decided to try for a place in the Yorkshire eleven. However, his form in a couple of matches against opposition that was not recognised as first-class was not encouraging, so that Willis returned to league cricket. From 1891 he shifted to the Nelson Club (later famous as where Ted McDonald played when qualifying for Lancashire) and proved himself the best bowler in league cricket. In 1895 he took 106 wickets for 8½ runs apiece and in 1893 as many as 118 wickets fell to his bowling in league games.

Cuttell, long qualified by residence for Lancashire, was finally engaged by them for the season of 1896. He played only two games and then was dropped, but the following year, after a rather slow start, Cuttell showed himself right up to the standard of first-class county cricket. On hard pitches he was never especially difficult, but on the softer pitches at the end of the season he was frequently deadly, taking twelve for 81 in the last match against Nottinghamshire. His work on soft pitches was deadly enough for him to head the Lancashire averages for all first-class games and was chosen as Cricketer of the Year by Wisden.

In 1898, with Hallam ill, Mold injured more than once, and Briggs terribly out of form, Cuttell became the mainstay of Lancashire cricket. Although his wickets were very expensive considering the many rain-affected wickets, his batting advanced so much that he accomplished the "double" of 1,000 runs and 100 wickets. He achieved his best haul of eight for 105 against Gloucestershire on a good pitch in July. He toured South Africa because the matting wickets were expected to suit his style, but did nothing of remarkable quality in his only Tests. The following year, with very few pitches to help him, Cuttell was less successful as a bowler and could not gain a place against Australia, but he batted very well, scoring 137 against Nottinghamshire and scoring more runs than in any other season. 1900 saw Cuttell re-assert himself as one of the best bowlers in England, but with Rhodes and Haigh establishing themselves as the deadliest bowlers on sticky wickets Cuttell's days as a representative player were over. 1901 to 1903 were very disappointing both in batting and bowling, but in 1904 Cuttell's bowling on several sticky wickets in May was decisive in giving Lancashire a surprise championship win after losing Sydney Barnes.

Despite a dreadful 1905, Cuttell bowled with deadly effect in 1906, being ahead even of Haigh in the national bowling averages despite taking over 100 fewer wickets. However, aged 43, he had already decided on the post of coach at Rugby School, which he held right through to 1926. At the age of 63, he then became an umpire in county matches, but could carry out this role for only two years before his health deteriorated too much.
