= Wisden Australia's Cricketer of the Year =

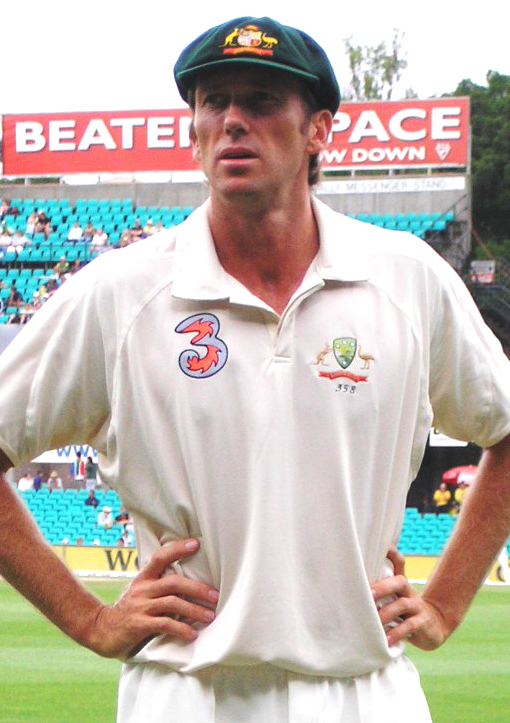
Glenn McGrath was named Cricketer of the Year on three occasions, the only multiple winner.

Each year from 1998 to 2005 Wisden Australia selected one Australian cricketer as Wisden Australia's Cricketers of the Year. The award recognised that player's contribution to cricket in Australia in the previous season, in a similar manner to the Wisden Cricketers of the Year, selected by Wisden Cricketers' Almanack based on their influence on the game in England.

The first award was made to a women's cricketer, Belinda Clark. Until Claire Taylor was nominated by Wisden in 2009, no other woman had been a Cricketer of the Year in any format of the almanack.

== List of Wisden Australia's Cricketers of the Year ==
Year	Recipient
1998	Belinda Clark
1999	Glenn McGrath
2000–01	Steve Waugh
2001–02	Glenn McGrath
2002–03	Adam Gilchrist
2003–04	Ricky Ponting
2004–05	Darren Lehmann
2005–06	Glenn McGrath
