= Walter Turner (cricketer) =

English cricketer

Personal information
- Full name: Walter Martin FitzHerbert Turner
- Born: 4 April 1881; Meerut, Uttar Pradesh, India
- Died: 1 February 1948 (aged 66); Harrow, Middlesex, England
- Batting: Right-handed
- Role: Batsman
- Relatives: Antony Turner (son)

Domestic team information
- Years: Team
- 1899–1911: Essex

Career statistics
Competition	FC
Matches	51
Runs scored	2090
Batting average	26.45
100s/50s	2/13
Top score	172
Balls bowled
Wickets	5
Bowling average	41.00
5 wickets in innings
10 wickets in match
Best bowling	2/12
Catches/stumpings	62/0
- Source: Cricinfo, 24 July 2013

Lt. Col Walter Martin Fitzherbert Turner (4 April 1881 – 1 February 1948) was an English cricketer. He played for Essex between 1899 and 1911, and the Europeans. A 'strong driver and cutter' his cricketing career covered 27 seasons when on leave from military service.

== Life ==
Walter Martin Fitzherbert Turner was born on 4 April 1881 at Meerut, Uttar Pradesh, India, the son of Major J.T. Turner who himself played cricket for Hong Kong and lost his life returning to Hong Kong from a match in Shanghai on board the SS Bokhara. Walter Turner was the brother of another first-class cricketer, Arthur Turner, and educated at Bedford Modern School between 1891 and 1893, and thereafter at Wellington College where he was in the first XI in 1897.

Walter Turner began his first-class career for Essex in 1899 shortly before his commission in the Royal Artillery on 6 January 1900. Thereafter he played as a batsman for Essex when on leave from his military duties abroad. Turner’s best performance was in the 1906 season when he scored 924 runs at 33.00. On returning to England after the first world war, he played in the 1919 season where he scored 371 runs at 51.57 and achieved a career match best with 172 runs against Middlesex. His son, Antony, was also a first-class cricketer.

In terms of his military career, he was promoted Major on 11 June 1915 and Lieutenant-Colonel on 1 January 1917. He retired from the army on 23 December 1925.
