= Albert Hallam =

English cricketer

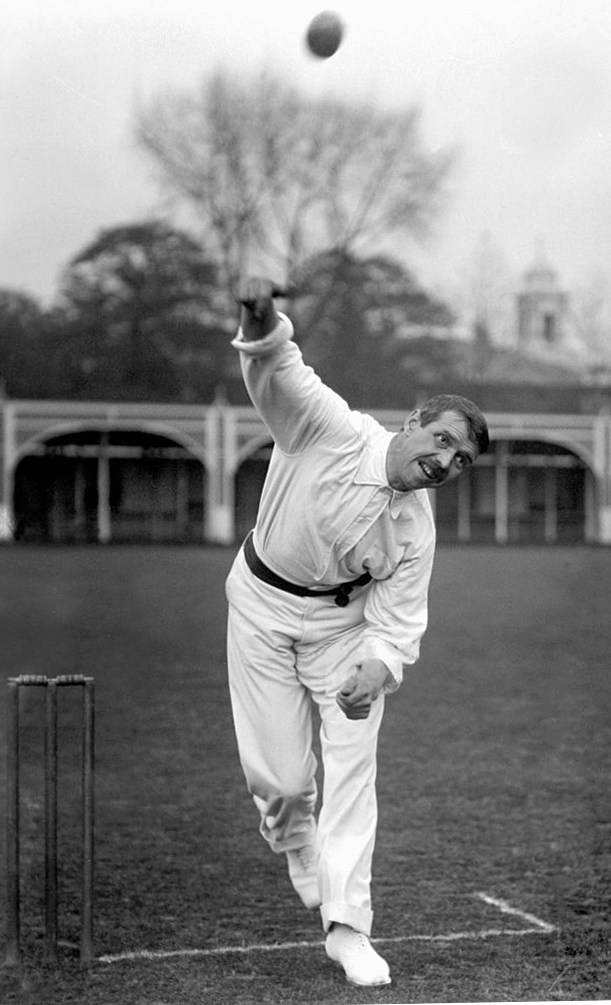
- Hallam in around 1905

Personal information
- Born: 12 November 1869; East Leake, Nottinghamshire, England
- Died: 24 July 1940 (aged 70); Loughborough, England
- Batting: Right-handed
- Bowling: Right-arm off break

Career statistics
Competition	First-class
Matches	273
Runs scored	2,606
Batting average	9.83
100s/50s	0/2
Top score	57
Balls bowled	52,810
Wickets	1,012
Bowling average	19.02
5 wickets in innings	63
10 wickets in match	10
Best bowling	8/63
Catches/stumpings	173/–
- Source: CricketArchive, 8 May 2022

Albert William Hallam (12 November 1869 – 24 July 1940) was an English off spin bowler who is primarily remembered, along with Thomas Wass, for giving Nottinghamshire an astonishing win in the County Championship of 1907. They did not lose a single match and managed to win fifteen out of nineteen games in which a ball was actually bowled. This is the highest proportion of wins by an undefeated side and the third highest proportion of wins in County Championship history – and the two higher figures were in very dry summers with almost no rain interruptions.

Hallam was, at Nottinghamshire, the successor to the more famous Alfred Shaw and William Attewell. He was a slow bowler with extreme accuracy of pitch who could flight the ball with great skill and turn the ball both ways. He had few pretensions as a batsman, but his innings of 46 at The Oval against Surrey was critical to Nottinghamshire remaining unbeaten for the season.

== Early years ==
Like so many Nottinghamshire-born men, Albert Hallam took to cricket at an early age. However, as he developed, he was not seen as good enough for a regular place in the Nottinghamshire eleven and, already residing in Leicestershire, played for them for a number of years in the late 1880s and early 1890s. Though these matches were not first-class, Hallam acquired a good enough reputation for Lancashire, desperate for support for the seemingly irrepressible Mold and Briggs, to encourage Hallam to qualify. He steadily improved, and by 1896 Hallam's slow bowling was already providing Lancashire with a third force in attack. He actually beat Briggs in the averages and was only a fraction behind Mold, though he did less than half as much bowling as the two established bowlers. The following year, these three bowlers, together with the newly imported Willis Cuttell, gave Lancashire a deadly attack on any helpful wicket and they won the County Championship. Hallam bowled consistently well and in all matches just reached 100 wickets. Nevertheless Wisden and many batsmen thought he was not nearly so good as the other three bowlers because he was too regular on dry pitches and helped batsmen to play themselves in.

== Illness and move home ==
The triumphs of 1896 and 1897 were followed by disaster for Hallam, however. Always a sensitive figure of slight build, his health broke down so badly that he could not play in a single match for Lancashire in 1898, and broke down again soon after resuming playing in 1899. Such setbacks would have certainly finished most cricketing careers, but Hallam worked hard to improve his health during 1900. Nevertheless, Lancashire's bowling had become so strong that he was able to play only four games for the first eleven, with the result that Nottinghamshire, wanting a bowler to support Wass and John Gunn, turned to Hallam (qualified for them by birth). Hallam established himself quickly as a steady stock bowler during the following three years, though he was seldom deadly even when the pitches suited slow bowling as they usually did in 1902 and 1903. In 1904, Hallam was so disappointing when the weather turned fine that he was left out of four matches and did not once take five wickets in an innings, but he rebounded in 1905 with some excellent performances, notably 6 for 46 on a worn wicket at Lord's and a career-best 8 for 63 for North Of England in a festival game in September.

== A prelude and an extraordinary triumph ==
1906 saw Hallam develop his skill considerably, showing an ability to spin the ball past the bat of even a watchful batsman when the pitch helped him. However, his greatest feat that season was the amazing endurance he showed in bowling, on a perfect Lord's wicket, 58 overs with a damaged hand and winning the match with Middlesex for the second successive year.

Nobody, though, could have been prepared for the following year's cricket. Striking their form at the start, Hallam and Wass were so deadly on the treacherous pitches that they won match after match with almost no bowling changes – they took all but fifty of the 348 wickets falling to Nottinghamshire in nineteen County Championship matches, only one of which was played throughout on a pitch unaffected by rain. In almost all Nottinghamshire's matches, the soft turf took all the spin Hallam and Wass could get on the ball, and even the best wet-wicket batsmen could never make a stand against them. It was thought Hallam should have played in the Test matches against South Africa, but he was chosen only for the third and declined due to a damaged hand which had prevented him participating in Nottinghamshire's game with the tourists. However, he did displace Schofield Haigh from his perennial position at the top of the bowling averages and was nominated as a Wisden Cricketer of the Year.

== Later life ==
Because it was clear that their bowling would be ineffective on rock-hard Australian pitches (and their bodies would not withstand the hard work under such conditions), Hallam and Wass were never considered for the winter's Ashes tour.

However, it was still a surprise how Hallam declined the following year. Affected by rheumatism in the right shoulder, his haul of wickets in county cricket fell from 153 to 72 and his average more than doubled. 1909, a summer equally as wet as 1907, was little better even if Hallam was twice unplayable against weak opponents on dreadful pitches. Already forty years of age, it was clear Hallam was not going to recover his form as he had done at least twice before, and after bowling with very moderate success in the early games of 1910 he was left out of the Nottinghamshire eleven for James Iremonger to develop as a bowler. He played in Lancashire League cricket until World War I and returned to Leicestershire after that, dying there in 1940 at the age of seventy.
