= Schofield Haigh =

English cricketer

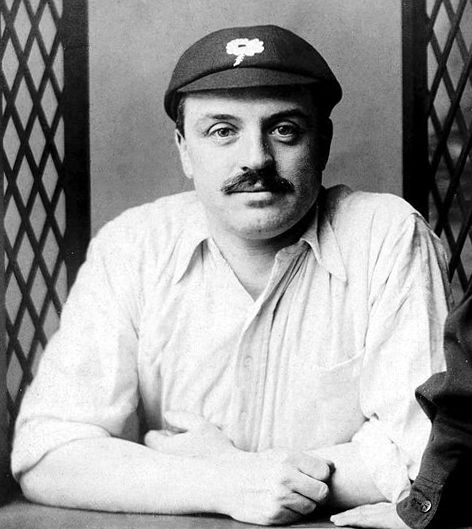

Personal information
- Full name: Schofield Haigh
- Born: 19 March 1871; Berry Brow, Yorkshire, England
- Died: 27 February 1921 (aged 49); Huddersfield, England
- Batting: Right-handed
- Bowling: Right arm fast-medium

International information
- National side: England
- Test debut (cap 113): 14 February 1899 v South Africa
- Last Test: 31 July 1912 v Australia

Domestic team information
- Years: Team
- 1895–1913: Yorkshire

Career statistics
Competition	Test	First-class
Matches	11	561
Runs scored	113	11,713
Batting average	7.53	18.65
100s/50s	0/0	4/47
Top score	25	159
Balls bowled	1,294	78,817
Wickets	24	2,012
Bowling average	25.91	15.94
5 wickets in innings	1	135
10 wickets in match	0	30
Best bowling	6/11	9/25
Catches/stumpings	8/–	299/–
- Source: Cricinfo, 2 October 2009

Schofield Haigh (19 March 1871 – 27 February 1921) was a Yorkshire and England cricketer. He played for nineteen seasons for Yorkshire County Cricket Club, sporadically for England from 1898–99 to 1912, and was a Wisden Cricketer of the Year in 1901.

== Early life and beginnings with Yorkshire ==
Born in Berry Brow, Huddersfield, Yorkshire, England, Haigh began his career under the coaching of Louis Hall in Aberdeen and Perth. He also played club cricket for Keighley and Armitage Bridge, who also produced Jack Beaumont for Surrey and later Crowther Charlesworth for Warwickshire.

Haigh debuted for Yorkshire in 1895 and remained with the Tykes until 1913. He started with Yorkshire as a fast bowler with a long run-up for the era. He played a few times for Yorkshire in 1895 but took fewer than ten wickets. However, when Yorkshire's regular bowlers Peel, Hirst and Wainwright were struggling in the very dry weather of the early 1896 season, Haigh was introduced to the team with great success. He took 7 for 25 in each innings against Durham, (Note: Durham was then a "second-class" county and would not become first-class until 1992.) and was immediately given his county cap and elevated permanently to the first eleven. Possessing a strong break-back and a slower ball very difficult to detect because of lack of change of action, Haigh became viewed as the hard-wicket bowler Yorkshire sought for many seasons. Despite not playing the last four games due to illness, Haigh took 84 wickets for just over 15 runs each, including 8 for 78 on a good wicket against the Australians.

== Deadliest sticky wicket bowler ==
However, the following season the strain on his slight frame of bowling fast began to tell on Haigh, and though his 91 wickets at 18.75 placed him in the top twenty of the national averages, he was already noticed to be less formidable than Yorkshire's other bowlers on firm pitches, but quite unplayable after rain – as in the home games with Surrey and Derbyshire. Although he produced a skilful performance against Middlesex at Lord's on a hard pitch the following year, Haigh did comparatively little else of note except on sticky wickets. On such a sticky wicket his return of 14 for 43 beat Hampshire in one day's cricket. Haigh did nonetheless play representative cricket for the first time for the Players at Lord's in celebration of W. G. Grace's fiftieth birthday; however, his selection was widely criticised and he ultimately achieved little. Nevertheless, Haigh soon became recognised as the deadliest right-handed bowler in the country on sticky wickets, and he was highly successful under his county captain Lord Hawke on the matting pitches in South Africa in 1898–99, helping Albert Trott to dismiss South Africa for 35 with 6 for 11.

Modifying his style to eliminate the sudden plunge and long run-up, Haigh took 163 wickets in 1900 and helped Wilfred Rhodes to give Yorkshire the first unbeaten season in the official County Championship.

Haigh's batting also developed. Having never previously played an innings of 40, he would help George Hirst put on 192 for the ninth wicket on a difficult pitch against Surrey in 1898, and against Worcestershire in 1900 he played an innings critical to maintaining Yorkshire's undefeated record in the County Championship. In 1901, Haigh fell off with the ball in part due to an injured knee that ended his season prematurely, but averaged 26 with the bat. He scored 96 in a sensational loss to Somerset, and then his maiden century and highest career score before lunch against Nottinghamshire in another big stand with Hirst. In 1902 Haigh bounced back with the ball to such a degree that his 158 wickets were taken in just 799 overs – a strike rate rivalled since 1895 only by Colin Blythe in 1912 and Harold Larwood in 1931. He also remained useful with the bat, again helping Yorkshire ward off defeat, this time against nearest rival Sussex. Haigh was controversially omitted from all the Test matches – being left out at the last minute at Sheffield and then England selectors were severely criticised for playing Fred Tate instead of him at Old Trafford. 1903 was a moderate season, but in 1904 Haigh returned to form with the ball and advanced in batting so much that he scored two centuries in consecutive innings and totalled over 1,000 runs, doing the "double" for the only time in his career.

== County stalwart ==
Called to the Test side with a sticky wicket expected in 1905, Haigh had a surprising off-day and was not picked again until 1909. Nevertheless, he came close to heading the national bowling averages for five successive seasons – being only shaded out by Albert Hallam in 1907, (Note: South African tourist Reggie Schwarz took 100 wickets at a lower average than either Hallam or Haigh in 1907.) in which season he took 13 for 40 against Warwickshire. He did not maintain his 1904 form with the bat and indeed did not score fifty in county cricket between 1907 and 1909.

After a poor season in 1910, Haigh returned to form in 1911 and 1912, when his 96 wickets for 11.41 was decisive in Yorkshire's County Championship win. However, another unsuccessful Test appearance and his age – forty-one – made Haigh decide in November 1912 to become coach at Winchester, with that school reserving the post for him until after the 1913 season. Despite missing some games due to a motor accident, Haigh did retain his place for Yorkshire primarily as a batsman with a long series of useful though never large innings, whilst his bowling lapsed into decline.

== Coach and untimely death ==
After 1913 Haigh was coach at Winchester School, where his work was praised from his first season as coach and was responsible for the emergence of Douglas Jardine.

After he retired from first-class cricket, Haigh umpired several first-class matches at the Scarborough Festival, and played a little for Keighley in the Bradford League and Huddersfield in the District League.

Haigh died aged 49 in Taylor Hill, Huddersfield, in early 1921 after a stroke.

== Player profile ==
After shifting away from the faster style of his first two seasons in county cricket, Haigh bowled right-hand medium pace, but could vary it with slower or faster deliveries, and when the pitch helped him he made the ball spin back from the off. The usefulness of Haigh's break-back saw over 74 per cent of his wickets taken without assistance from fieldsmen – the highest of any bowler with over 500 wickets.

However, because he was of slight build, Haigh was not able to undertake arduous spells of bowling, and his output of overs was always low for a frontline bowler. Moreover, after his first few seasons Haigh lacked the pace to be threatening against top batsmen on a good pitch. He was never considered for a tour of Australia, and his record in Test cricket in England was poor compared to his exploits in the county game.

Haigh has the lowest average of any bowler taking 1,000 wickets since 1895 except Hedley Verity. He was also a determined but underrated batsman, who scored a hundred before lunch in 1901, and a keen fieldsman.
