= Percy Adams (cricketer) =

English cricketer

Percy Webster Adams (5 September 1900 – 28 September 1962) was an English first-class cricketer.

== Biography ==
He was born at St Pancras, London and died at Westminster Hospital, Pimlico, London. Adams achieved fame by being selected by Wisden as one of its five Cricketers of the Year in 1919 when the choice was restricted because of the lack of first-class cricket the previous summer.

Adams was a batsman and wicketkeeper at Cheltenham College. Unlike others of the schoolboys selected by Wisden in both 1918 and 1919, he did not go on to a prominent career in first-class cricket: he played just one match for Sussex, against Cambridge University in 1922, scoring two runs and making one stumping.

In his later life he was known as "Peter", rather than Percy, and it was as Peter Adams that his death notice appeared in The Times the day after he died.
