= 1897 English cricket season =

Cricket season review

The 1897 English cricket season featured the eighth edition of the County Championship. Lancashire won the championship for the first time, thanks mainly to only three losses in twenty-six matches. Surrey won more games, and beat Lancashire twice, but one more loss than Lancashire meant that they would have to be content with second place. They could have taken the championship if they had beaten Sussex in the last game at Hove but, after gaining a five-run lead on first innings, Surrey let Billy Murdoch, C. B. Fry and George Bean make half-centuries, and rain spoiled their chances of winning on the final day. At the bottom of the table, Derbyshire suffered a run of 16 matches without victory to finish last in the table and, with the end of the 1896 season having yielded three matches without a win, Derbyshire's streak ran to 19 matches without a win.

== Honours ==
- County Championship – Lancashire
- Minor Counties Championship – Worcestershire
- Wisden – Frederick Bull, Willis Cuttell, Frank Druce, Gilbert Jessop, Jack Mason

== County Championship ==
=== Final table ===
County Championship 1897 – Final Standings
	Team	P	W	L	D	Pts	GC^{1}	Pts/GC (as %)
1	Lancashire	26	16	3	7	13	19	68.42
2	Surrey	26	17	4	5	13	21	61.90
3	Essex	16	7	2	7	5	9	55.56
4	Yorkshire	26	13	5	8	8	18	44.44
5	Gloucestershire	18	7	5	6	2	12	16.67
6	Sussex	20	5	6	9	−1	11	−9.09
7	Middlesex	16	3	4	9	−1	7	−14.29
7	Warwickshire	18	3	4	11	−1	7	−14.29
9	Hampshire	18	4	7	7	−3	11	−27.27
10	Nottinghamshire	16	2	5	9	−3	7	−42.86
11	Somerset	16	3	9	4	−6	12	−50.00
12	Kent	18	2	10	6	−8	12	−66.67
13	Leicestershire	14	1	10	3	−9	11	−81.82
14	Derbyshire	16	0	9	7	−9	9	−100.00

- ^{1} Games completed

Points system:

- 1 for a win
- 0 for a draw, a tie or an abandoned match
- -1 for a loss

=== Most runs in the County Championship ===
1897 County Championship – leading batsmen
Name	Team	Matches	Runs	Average	100s	50s
Bobby Abel	Surrey	26	1833	50.91	6	5
Jack Brown	Yorkshire	22	1431	43.36	3	6
Ted Wainwright	Yorkshire	25	1372	39.20	5	4
David Denton	Yorkshire	26	1328	34.05	2	8
Ranjitsinhji	Sussex	19	1318	42.51	3	6

=== Most wickets in the County Championship ===
1897 County Championship – leading bowlers
Name	Team	Matches	Balls bowled	Wickets taken	Average
Tom Richardson	Surrey	26	6990	238	14.23
Johnny Briggs	Lancashire	26	5770	140	16.38
Frederick Bull	Essex	16	4365	109	20.38
Willis Cuttell	Lancashire	26	519	102	17.77
John Hearne	Middlesex	16	5333	102	18.52

== Overall first-class statistics ==
=== Leading batsmen ===
1897 English cricket season – leading batsmen
Name	Team(s)	Matches	Runs	Average	100s	50s
Bobby Abel	Players, South of England, Surrey	32	2099	44.65	6	7
Ranjitsinhji	Gentlemen, Marylebone Cricket Club (MCC), Sussex	26	1940	45.11	5	7
Jack Brown	North of England, Players, Yorkshire	29	1809	42.06	3	9
George Brann	Gentlemen, South of England, Sussex	26	1626	36.95	3	12
Ted Wainwright	North of England, Players, Yorkshire	32	1612	35.82	5	6

=== Leading bowlers ===
1897 English cricket season – leading bowlers
Name	Team(s)	Matches	Balls bowled	Wickets taken	Average
Tom Richardson	Players, South of England, Surrey	30	8019	273	14.45
John Hearne	Marylebone Cricket Club (MCC), Middlesex, Players	26	8113	173	17.72
Johnny Briggs	Lancashire	28	6465	155	16.51
Cyril Bland	South of England, Sussex	26	5703	129	21.66
Willis Cuttell	Lancashire, North of England	29	5609	120	16.45

== Annual reviews ==
- James Lillywhite's Cricketers' Annual (Red Lilly), Lillywhite, 1898
- Wisden Cricketers' Almanack 1898
