= Frederick Bull =

English cricketer

Frederick George Bull
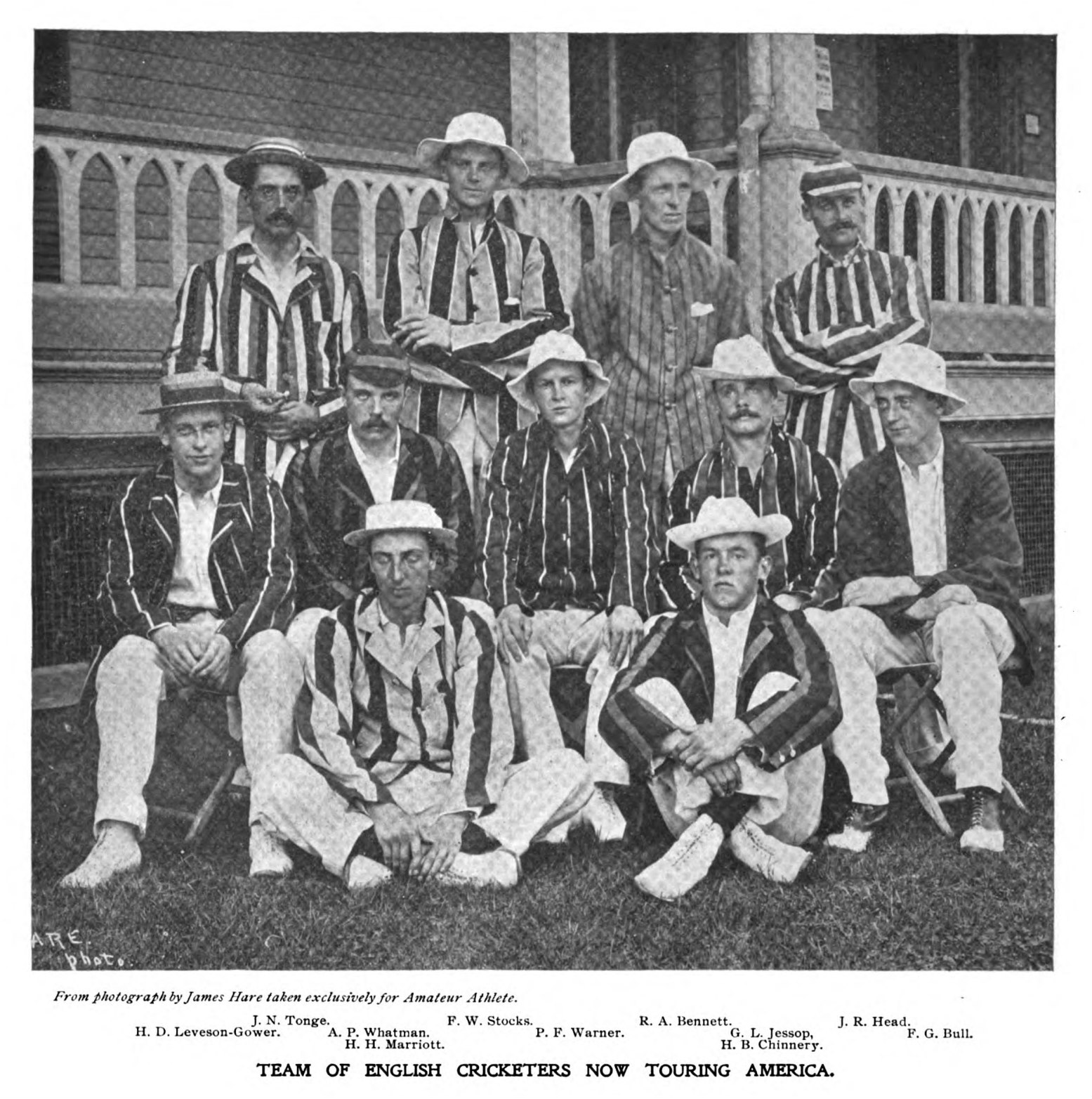
- Bull, far right in middle row, on North American tour in 1897
- Born: April 2, 1875; Hackney, London
- Died: September 16, 1910 (aged 35); St Annes-on-Sea, Lancashire
- Occupation: cricketer

Frederick George Bull, born at Hackney, London on 2 April 1875 and found drowned at St Annes-on-Sea, Lancashire, on 16 September 1910, was an English first-class cricketer who played for Essex.

Bull was a lower-order right-hand batsman and an off break bowler who had a few very productive seasons for Essex and after the most successful of them was named as a Wisden Cricketer of the Year in 1898. He came to the fore in 1896 with 85 wickets, took 120 in 1897 and then 101 in 1898. But in 1899, he fell away, with only 65 wickets and the following year, after seven matches in which he took only five wickets, he took a job in Blackburn, Lancashire and left the first-class game. He resigned from his assistant secretary role with the club in 1901.

There was one brief comeback. In 1905, five years after his final game for Essex, Bull played for Scotland against the Australian touring team. He took eight wickets in the match, with five for 58 runs in the Australians' second innings. Bull would appear in the amateur Lancashire league in 1907 for East Lancashire.
