= 1898 English cricket season =

Cricket season review

The 1898 English cricket season featured the ninth edition of the County Championship. Yorkshire won the championship for the second time in three years. It was an emphatic victory with a record of sixteen wins and seven draws in 26 games. Middlesex finished second after two wins over Kent in late August to improve five places on their 1897 finish. Derbyshire broke their streak of 22 Championship matches without victory by beating Hampshire in late May. As for individual performances, Surrey batsman Bobby Abel made 1800 runs for the second season in succession, one run shy of his own championship record in 1897.

== Honours ==
- County Championship – Yorkshire
- Minor Counties Championship – Worcestershire
- Wisden (Five Cricketers of the Year) – Wilfred Rhodes, Bill Storer, Charlie Townsend, Albert Trott, William Lockwood

== County Championship ==
=== Final table ===
County Championship 1898 – Final Standings
	Team	P	W	L	D		Pts	GC^{1}	Pts/GC (as %)
1	Yorkshire	26	16	3	7	0	13	19	68.42
2	Middlesex	18	10	3	5	0	7	13	53.85
3	Gloucestershire	20	9	3	8	0	6	12	50.00
4	Surrey	26	11	4	9	2	7	15	46.67
5	Essex	20	10	6	4	0	4	16	25.00
6	Lancashire	26	9	6	11	0	3	15	20.00
7	Kent	20	5	6	9	0	−1	11	−9.09
8	Nottinghamshire	16	1	2	13	0	−1	3	−33.33
9	Derbyshire	16	2	6	7	1	−4	8	−50.00
9	Sussex	20	3	9	8	0	−6	12	−50.00
9	Warwickshire	18	2	6	9	1	−4	8	−50.00
12	Hampshire	18	2	8	8	0	−6	10	−60.00
13	Leicestershire	16	1	10	5	0	−9	11	−81.82
14	Somerset	16	1	10	5	0	−9	11	−81.82

- ^{1} Games completed

Points system:

- 1 for a win
- 0 for a draw, a tie or an abandoned match
- -1 for a loss

=== Most runs in the County Championship ===
1898 County Championship – leading batsmen
Name	Team	Matches	Runs	Average	100s	50s
Bobby Abel	Surrey	24	1832	57.25	7	10
Johnny Tyldesley	Lancashire	26	1801	39.15	2	12
CB Fry	Sussex	16	1604	59.40	6	8
John Tunnicliffe	Yorkshire	24	1538	46.60	4	8
Bill Brockwell	Surrey	24	1468	43.17	5	5

=== Most wickets in the County Championship ===
1898 County Championship – leading bowlers
Name	Team	Matches	Balls bowled	Wickets taken	Average
Charlie Townsend	Gloucestershire	20	4905	130	20.00
Wilfred Rhodes	Yorkshire	26	4949	126	13.84
Tom Richardson	Surrey	24	5167	126	21.29
Jack Hearne	Middlesex	18	5663	125	14.76
Bill Lockwood	Surrey	21	4188	109	17.06

== Overall first-class statistics ==
=== Leading batsmen ===
1898 English cricket season – leading batsmen
Name	Team(s)	Matches	Runs	Average	100s	50s
Bobby Abel	Players, Surrey	30	2053	48.88	7	11
Johnny Tyldesley	Lancashire, Players	29	1918	37.60	2	13
John Tunnicliffe	Players, Yorkshire	30	1804	41.00	4	9
CB Fry	Gentlemen, Sussex	19	1788	54.18	6	10
Bill Brockwell	Players, Surrey	30	1686	38.31	6	5

=== Leading bowlers ===
1898 English cricket season – leading bowlers
Name	Team(s)	Matches	Balls bowled	Wickets taken	Average
J. T. Hearne	Marylebone Cricket Club (MCC), Middlesex, Players	30	9053	222	14.05
Tom Richardson	Surrey	29	6119	161	19.54
Wilfred Rhodes	Players, Yorkshire	33	6149	154	14.60
Charlie Townsend	Gentlemen, Gloucestershire	25	5587	145	20.64
Bill Lockwood	Players, Surrey	26	5010	134	16.62

== Annual reviews ==
- James Lillywhite's Cricketers' Annual (Red Lilly), Lillywhite, 1899
- Wisden Cricketers' Almanack 1899
