= Tom Wass =

English cricketer

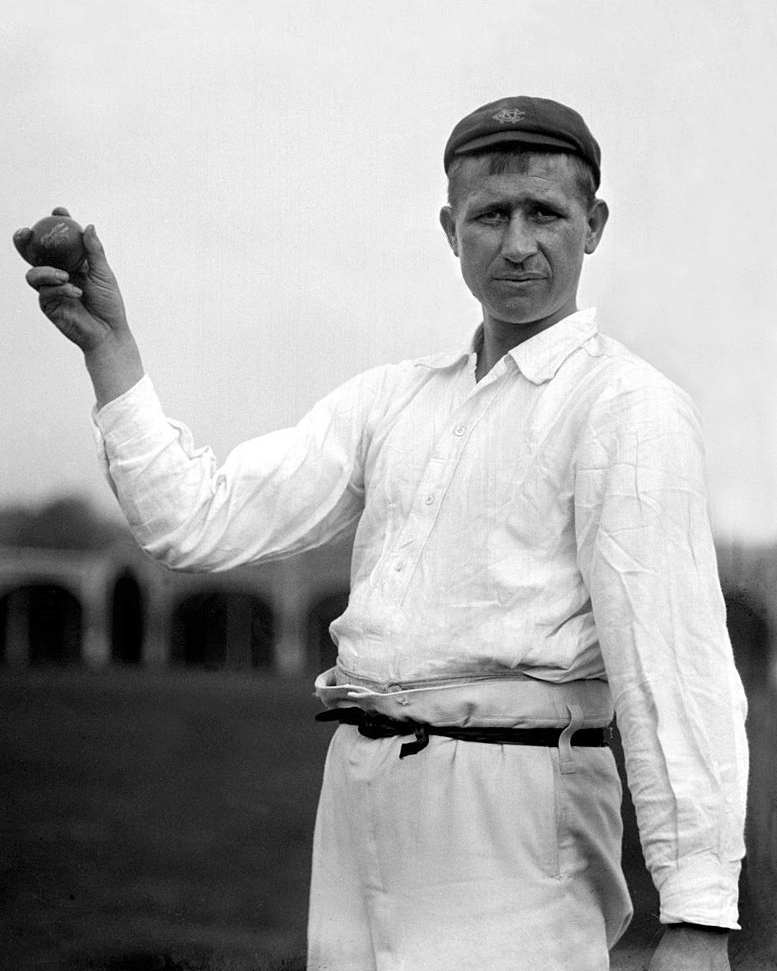
- Wass, c. 1905

Personal information
- Born: 26 December 1873; Sutton-in-Ashfield, Nottinghamshire, England
- Died: 27 October 1953 (aged 79); Sutton-in-Ashfield, England
- Batting: Right-handed
- Bowling: Right arm fast-medium

Career statistics
| Competition | First-class |
|---|---|
| Matches | 312 |
| Runs scored | 2,138 |
| Batting average | 7.29 |
| 100s/50s | 0/1 |
| Top score | 56 |
| Balls bowled | 71,399 |
| Wickets | 1,666 |
| Bowling average | 20.46 |
| 5 wickets in innings | 159 |
| 10 wickets in match | 45 |
| Best bowling | 9/67 |
| Catches/stumpings | 114/0 |
- Source: CricketArchive, 3 May 2022

Thomas George Wass (26 December 1873 – 27 October 1953) was a Nottinghamshire cricketer, a bowler best remembered, alongside Albert Hallam, for bowling that gave Nottinghamshire a brilliant County Championship win in 1907. Wass also holds the record for the most wickets taken for Nottinghamshire — 1633 for 20.34 each.

Tall and solidly built, Wass had a highly rhythmic run-up that allowed him to be, in his prime, fast through the air. However, it was his leg-cutter that made him formidable, and Wass, unlike most fast bowlers of the time, was very dangerous after rain but less effective on a firm pitch when the ball did not turn. He also had a very difficult slower ball that on his best days caught many batsmen unaware. Wass was a very moderate fieldsman, and had no pretensions to be a batsman — though he did score 56 against Derbyshire in 1906, he was dropped four times in doing so.

Wass began his career in local cricket but became a professional for Edinburgh Academicals and Liverpool. Qualified by residence, Wass was offered a place on the Lancashire staff but declined, yet he still took some time to establish himself in a Nottinghamshire side that was in the late 1890s exceedingly weak in bowling and it was never understood why he was given so little to do when he finally broke into the team in the last game against Lancashire. In his first two full seasons, he had very modest records, but in 1900 Wass became Nottinghamshire's chief bowler along with John Gunn, and bowled the team to seven victories as against five in the three seasons from 1897 to 1899. In 1901, apart from one match on a sticky wicket against a weak Derbyshire eleven, Wass was so disappointing he was dropped from the side. He took 58 wickets at the contemporaneously high cost of 29.72. On the wet wickets of 1902 Wass became one of the most difficult bowlers in the game, capturing 140 wickets at 15.89 runs each in all first-class cricket. It remains noteworthy how Wass' bowling was the decisive factor in each Nottinghamshire victory that summer:

- v Sussex at Hove: seven for 19 and five for 22
  - TOTAL 12 wickets for 41 runs
- v Leicestershire at Leicester: eight for 73 and five for 41
  - TOTAL 13 wickets for 114 runs
- v Derbyshire at Derby: three for 75 and six for 152
  - TOTAL 9 wickets for 227 runs (on one of the few hard wickets of a wet summer)
- v Gloucestershire at Trent Bridge: six for 94 and seven for 60
  - TOTAL 13 wickets for 154 runs
- v Derbyshire at Trent Bridge: five for 64 and six for 53
  - TOTAL 11 wickets for 117 runs
- v Lancashire at Old Trafford: five for 64 and seven for 48
  - TOTAL 12 wickets for 112 runs
- GRAND TOTAL for six wins: 70 wickets for 765 runs, average 10.93

In 1903, despite numerous soft pitches, Wass was less effective, taking 76 wickets, though this was frequently attributed to the extreme placidity of the Trent Bridge pitches in fine weather. Still, in 1904, though overworked in unfavourable conditions, Wass appeared for the Players at Kennington Oval, which was to remain one of only two appearances he ever made in a representative match. In 1905, he was at times deadly but handicapped by an injury in a local game, which kept him out of a third of Nottinghamshire's county matches.

May 1906 saw Wass at his deadliest, including one of the most remarkable games in county cricket at Aigburth, where he took 16 wickets in a day on a sticky wicket, yet Nottinghamshire still lost. However, after he recovered from a strain sustained in the Whitsuntide game against Surrey "the long-continued dry weather found out his limitations". In 1907, however, Wass opened with something even more sensational: taking 6 wickets for 3 runs against the Marylebone Cricket Club (MCC) after two blank days. This time wet weather continued almost continuously all summer, allowing Wass and Hallam to dominate match after match to such an extent that they took 298 wickets between them in just nineteen games, of which Nottinghamshire won fifteen and were never defeated. Nobody else bar John Gunn did any serious work, and Gunn took only 25 wickets in seventeen matches in which he bowled.

Wass was chosen in the thirteen for the First Test against South Africa at Lord's in 1907 but left out of the final eleven. In 1908, although Hallam declined owing to rheumatism in his right shoulder, Wass remained at his best and took sixteen for 103 in a day against Essex. 1909, a summer as wet as 1907, was very disappointing: although Hallam was back to full fitness, Wass had his worst record since 1905, but in the following two years he recovered his form, and when helped by the wicket remained as formidable as ever despite having lost much of his former pace. The wet summer of 1912 was disappointing, with the wickets more helpful than ever: Wass took fifty fewer wickets than in 1907. Then in 1913 he failed to reach 100 wickets in a full season for the first time in ten years. 1914, when Wass was handicapped by injury and missed seven games, saw him fall further to 69 wickets at his highest average since 1903. After the war he appeared only once, in Joe Hardstaff senior's benefit match. "Topsy" Wass was regarded as a character but was generally popular drawing a remarkably warm tribute from Sir Pelham Warner when he died.
