= John Brown (cricketer, born 1874) =

English cricketer

John Thomas Brown (24 November 1874 – 12 April 1950) was an English first-class cricketer.

Born in Snape Hill, Darfield, Yorkshire, England, Brown was a right arm fast bowler and right-handed tail end batsman. He played thirty matches for Yorkshire between 1897 and 1903. He took 97 wickets, with a best of 8 for 40 against Gloucestershire, at an average of 21.35. He took 5 wickets in an innings eight times, and 10 wickets in a match on two occasions. His best innings, a knock of 37*, came against Nottinghamshire.

He died in April 1950, in Duckmanton, Derbyshire. His brother, William Brown, was also a first-class cricketer for Yorkshire.

== Confusion ==
He is not to be confused with another John Thomas Brown, who played more frequently for Yorkshire (and England) over a similar time span. For clarity, the subject of this article is often described as Brown, J. T. (Darfield), the other as Brown, J. T. (Driffield).
