= Wisden Cricketers of the Year =

Cricket award in the United Kingdom

The Wisden Cricketers of the Year are cricketers selected for the honour by the annual publication Wisden Cricketers' Almanack, based "primarily for their influence on the previous English season". The award began in 1889 with the naming of "Six Great Bowlers of the Year", and continued with the naming of "Nine Great Batsmen of the Year" in 1890 and "6 Great Wicket-Keepers" in 1891.

Since 1897, with a few notable exceptions, the annual award has recognised five players of the year. No players were named in 1916 or 1917, as the First World War prevented any first-class cricket being played in England, while in 1918 and 1919 the recipients were five schoolboy cricketers. From 1941 to 1946, the Second World War caused the same issue and no players were named. Three players have been sole recipients: W. G. Grace (1896), Plum Warner (1921) and Jack Hobbs (1926). The latter two selections are the only exceptions to the rule that a player may receive the award only once. Hobbs was first recognised in 1909, but was selected a second time in 1926 to honour his breaking W. G. Grace's record of 126 first-class hundreds; Warner was first honoured in 1904, but received a second award in 1921 for his last season in first-class cricket, when he led Middlesex to a County Championship win. John Wisden, cricketer and eponymous founder of the almanack, was featured in a special commemorative section in the Jubilee edition of the publication in 1913, 29 years posthumously.

From 2000 to 2003 the award was made based on players' impact on cricket worldwide rather than just the preceding season in England, but the decision was reversed in 2004 with the introduction of a separate Wisden Leading Cricketer in the World award.

The oldest surviving recipient of the award is Neil Harvey (1954), which he became in February 2022 with the death of Sonny Ramadhin. The longest that a recipient has lived after receiving the award is 77 years by Harry Calder (1918), who died in 1995. Calder, however, uniquely for a male recipient, played no first-class cricket. Among first-class players, the longest-lived after receipt of the award is 74 years by Wilfred Rhodes (1899).

Eleven women have been chosen: Claire Taylor (2009), Charlotte Edwards (2014), Heather Knight (2018), Natalie Sciver (2018), Anya Shrubsole (2018), Tammy Beaumont (2019), Ellyse Perry (2020), Dane van Niekerk (2022), Harmanpreet Kaur (2023), Ashleigh Gardner (2024), Sophie Ecclestone (2025).

== List of Cricketers of the Year ==
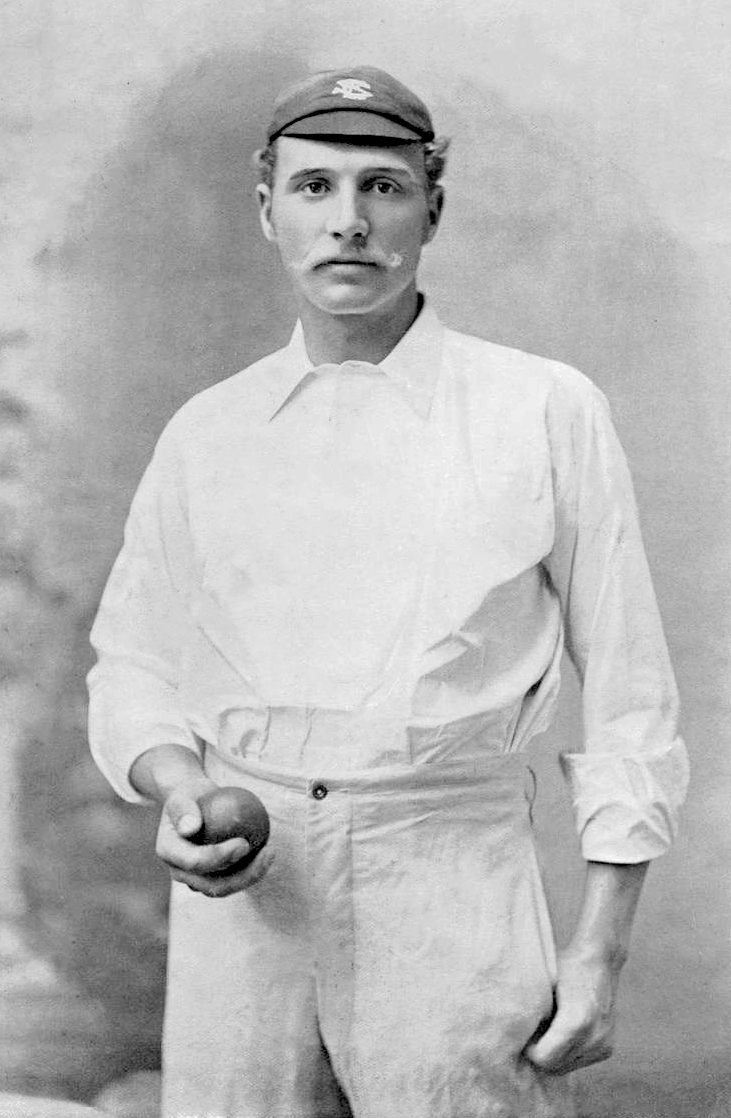
George Lohmann an inaugural nominee, 1889

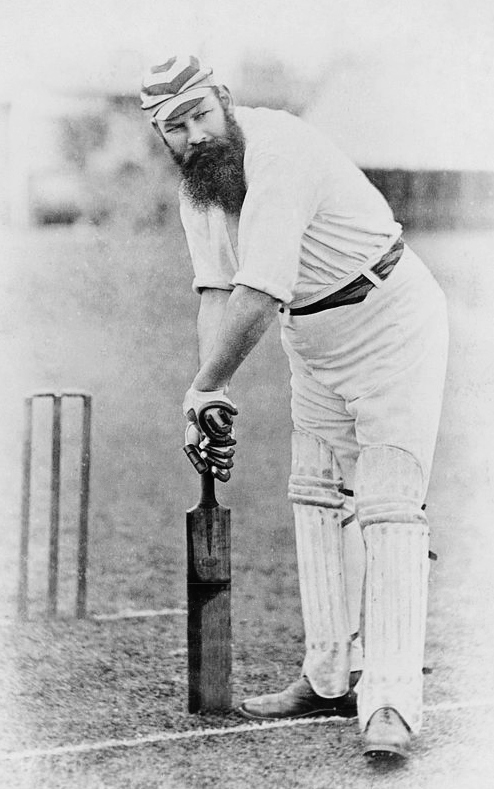
W.G. Grace, sole recipient of the honour, 1896

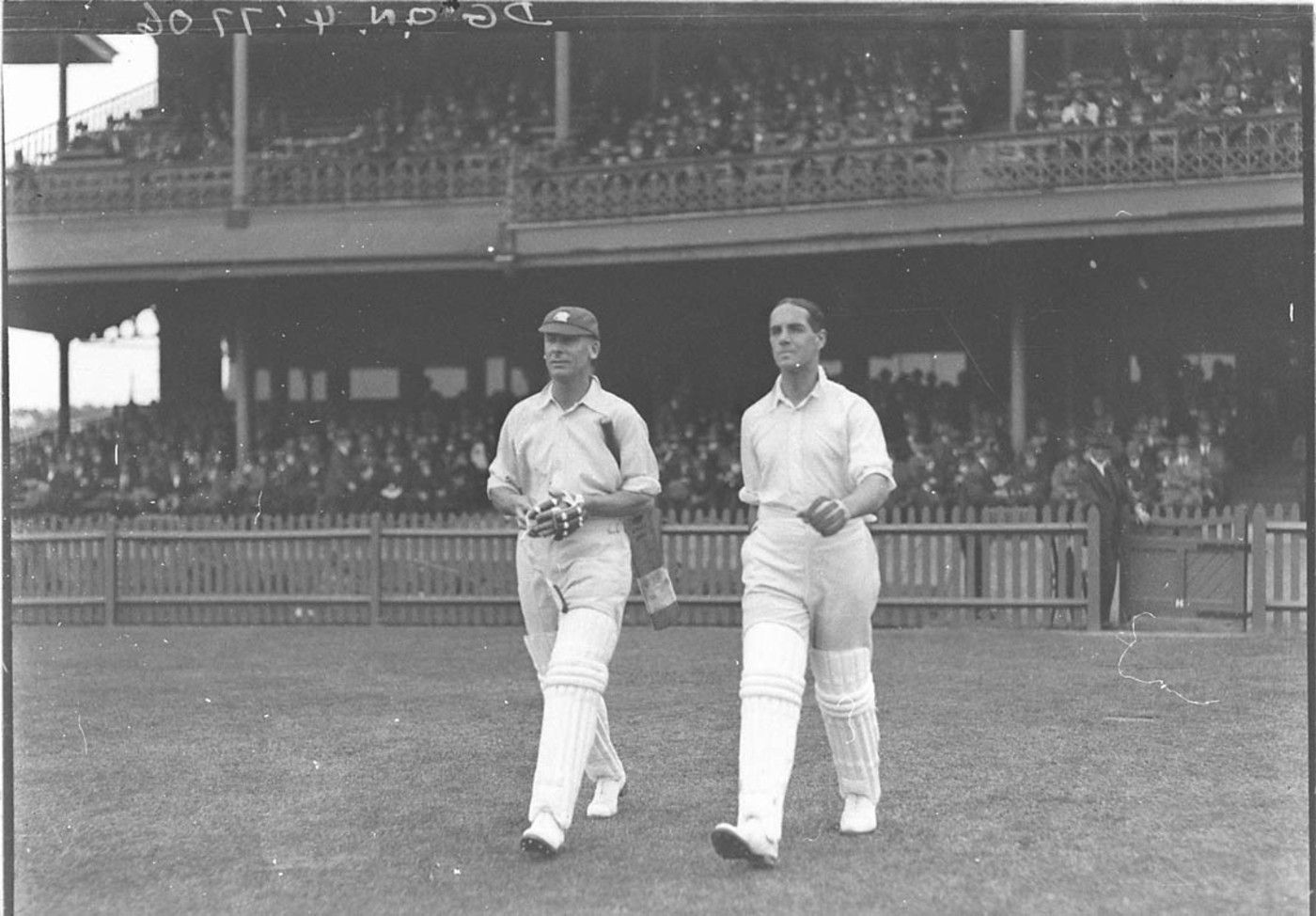
Jack Hobbs (l) and Herbert Sutcliffe. Hobbs was honoured in both 1909 and 1926, Sutcliffe in 1920.

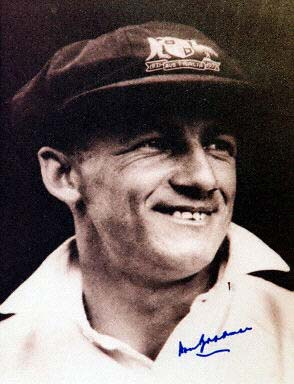
Sir Donald Bradman, recognised in 1931

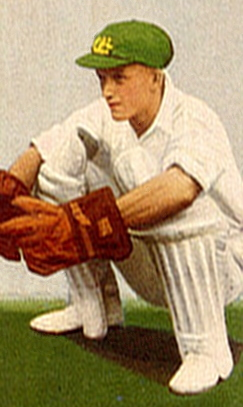
The Invincibles took all five awards in 1949; Don Tallon was their wicket-keeper.

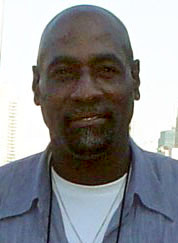
Viv Richards, recognised in 1977

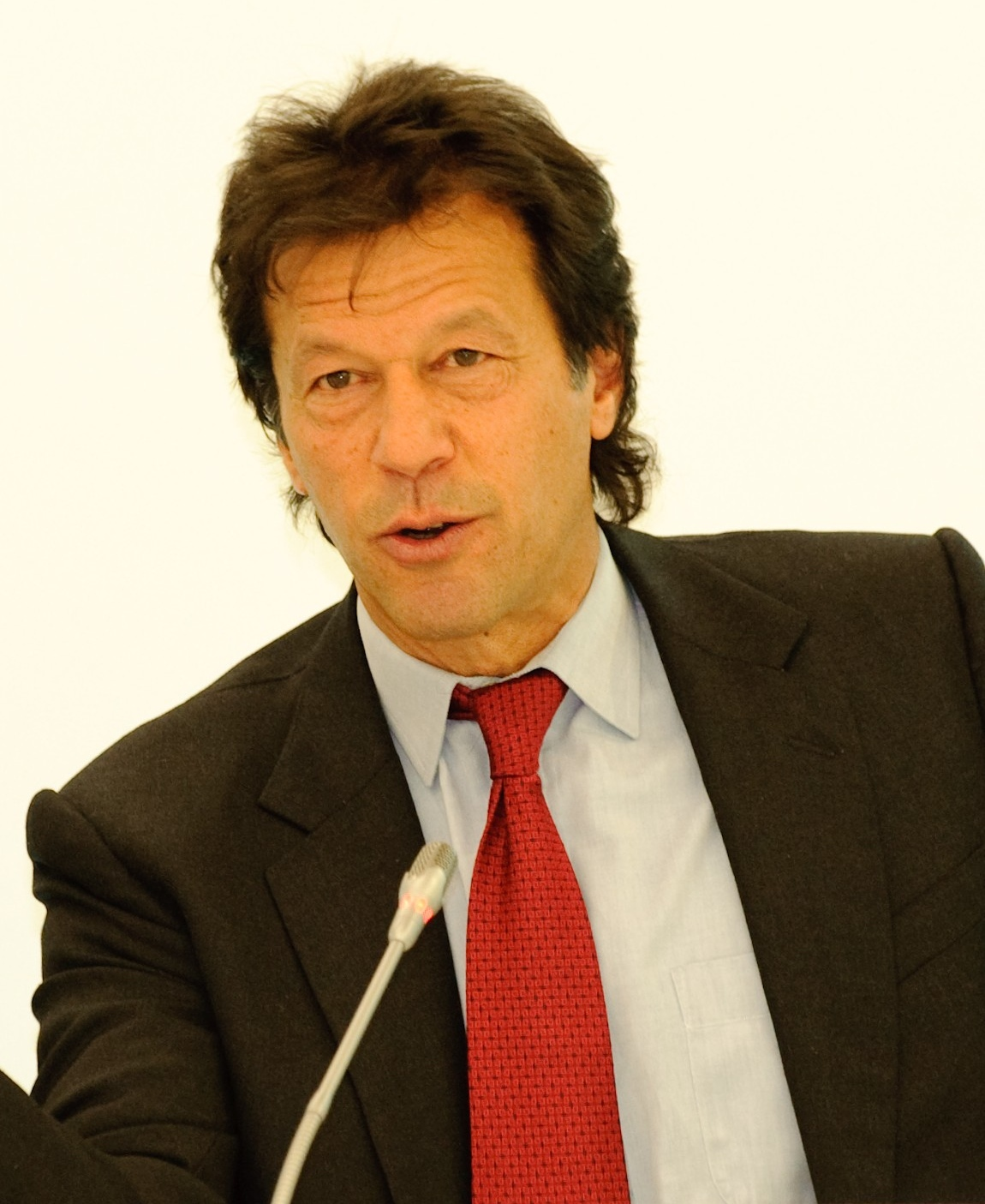
Imran Khan, recognised in 1983

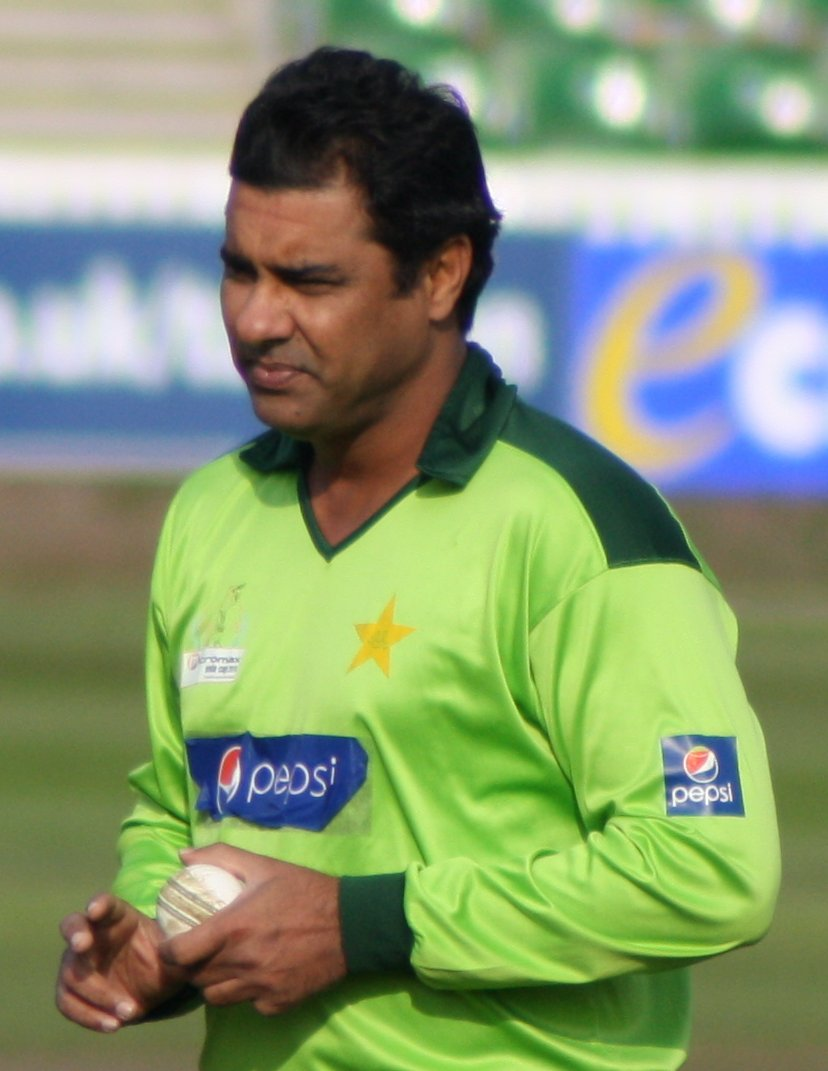
Waqar Younis, recognised in 1992

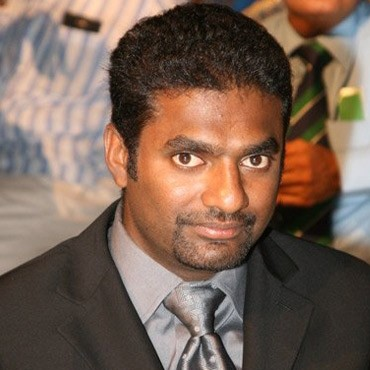
Muttiah Muralitharan, recognised in 1999

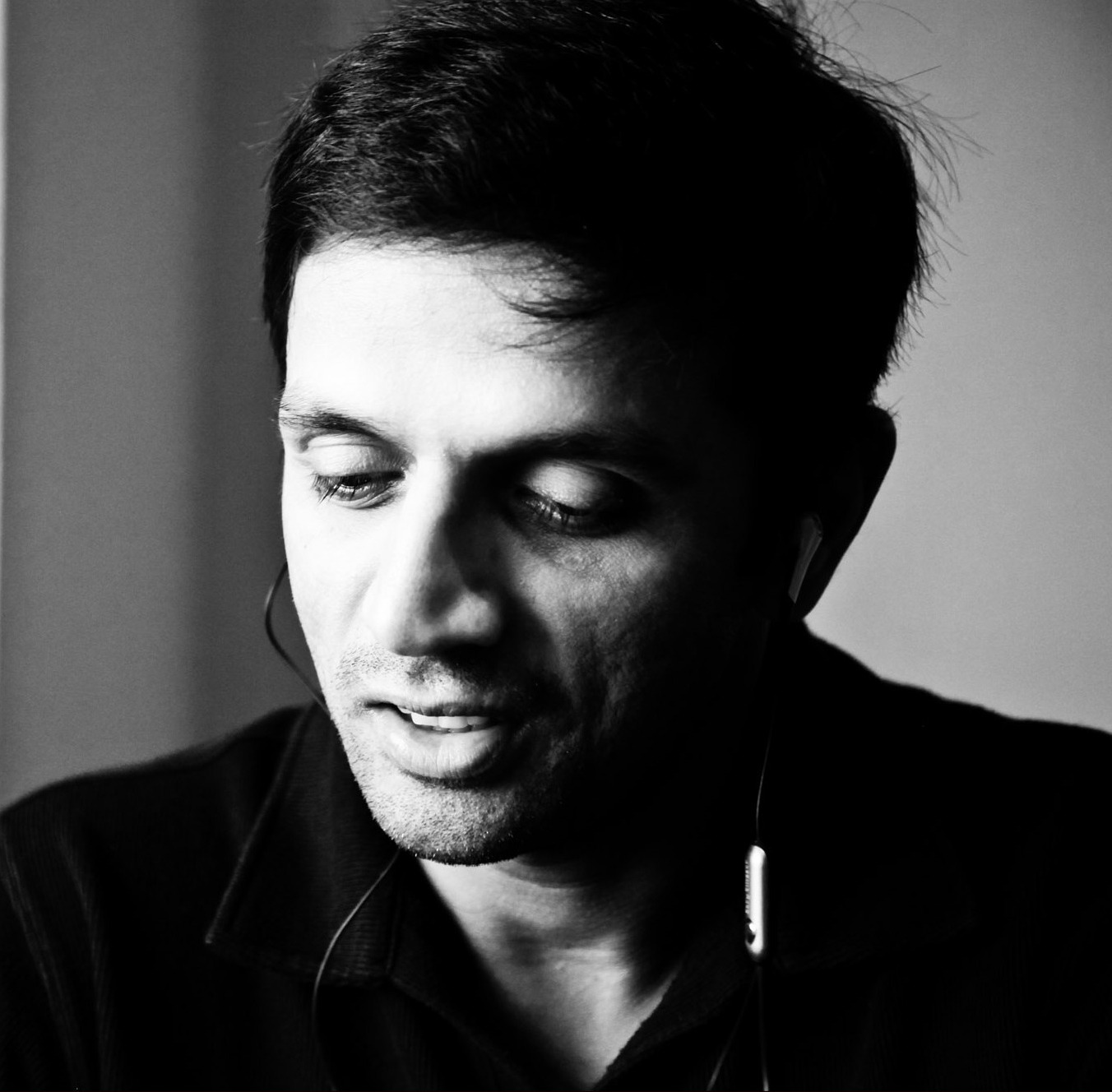
Rahul Dravid, recognised in 2000

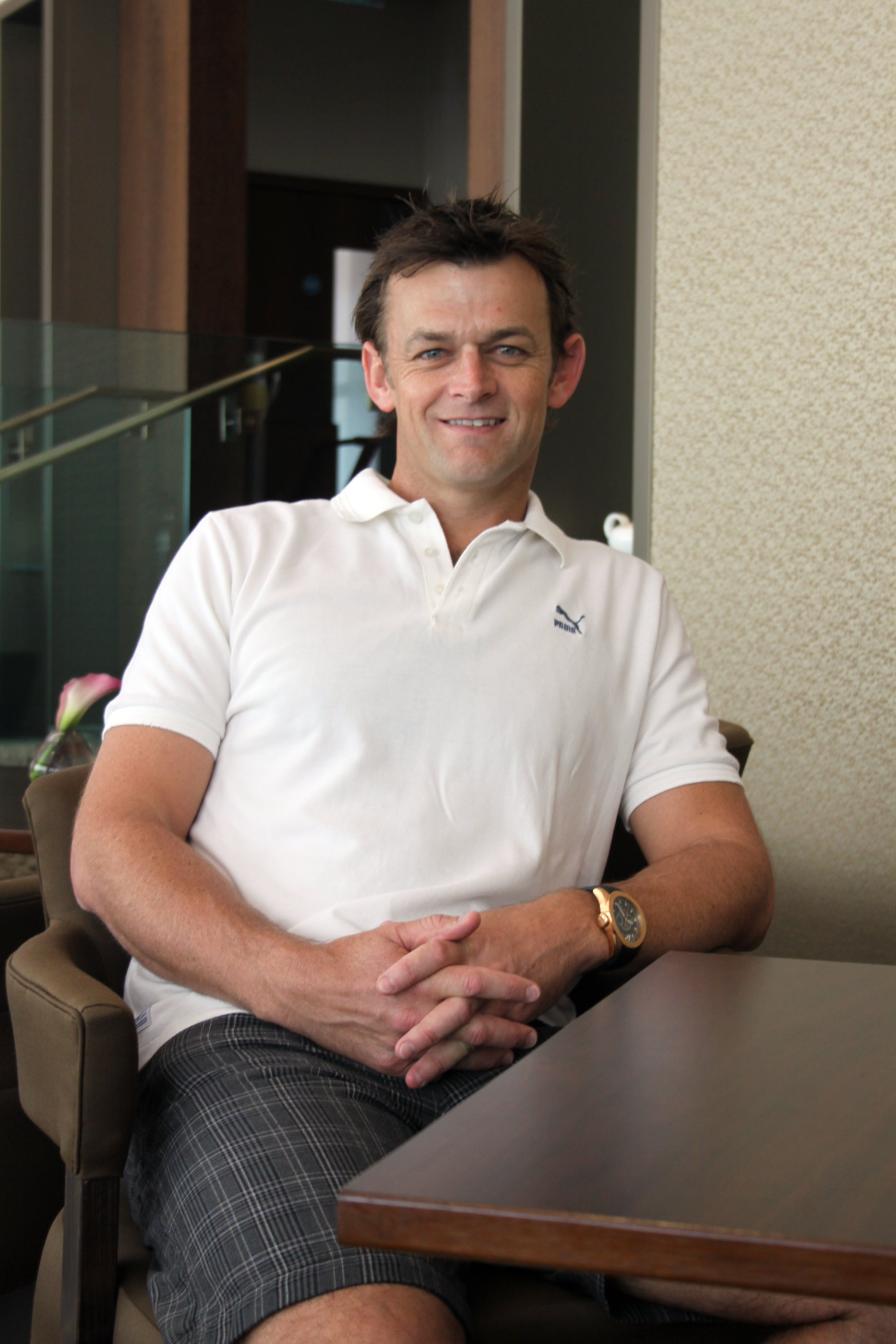
Adam Gilchrist, recognised in 2002

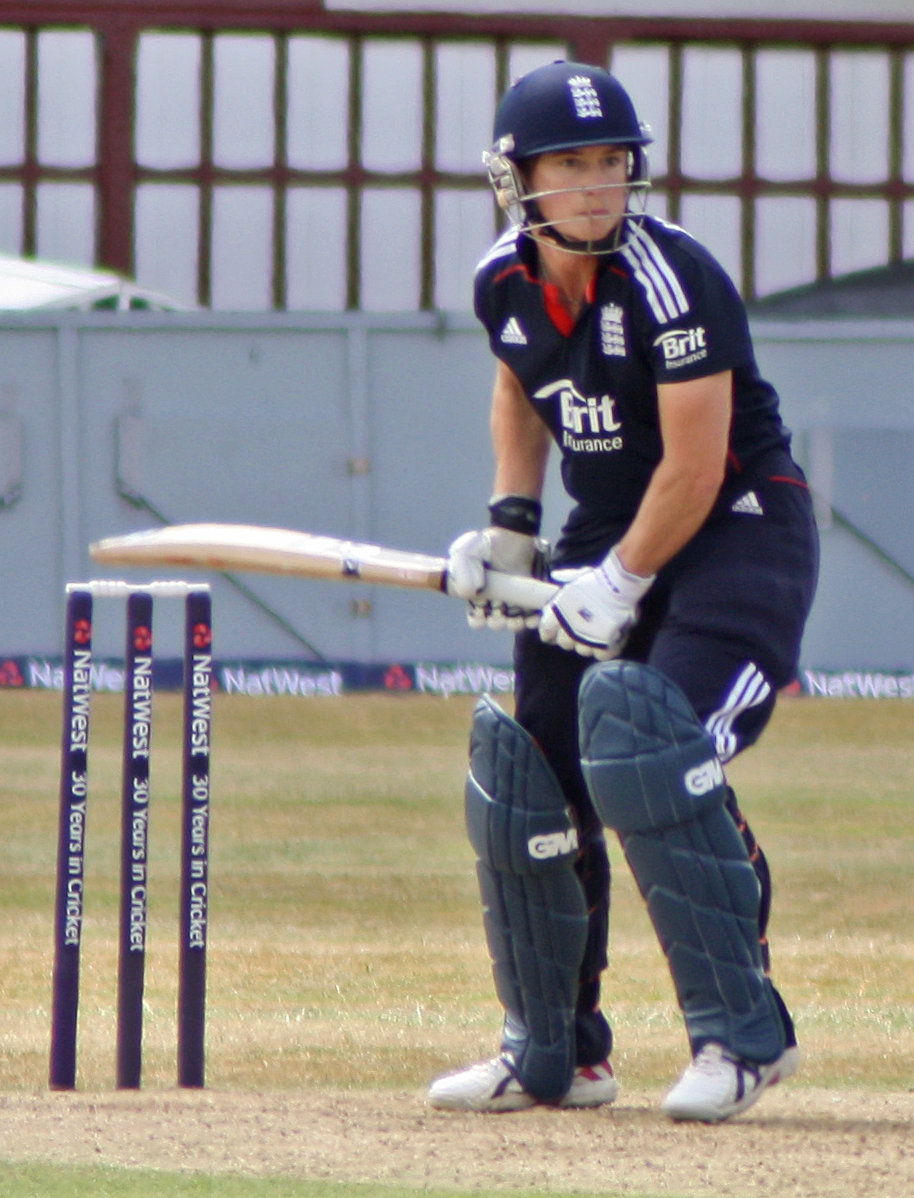
Claire Taylor, in 2009 became the first woman to be recognised

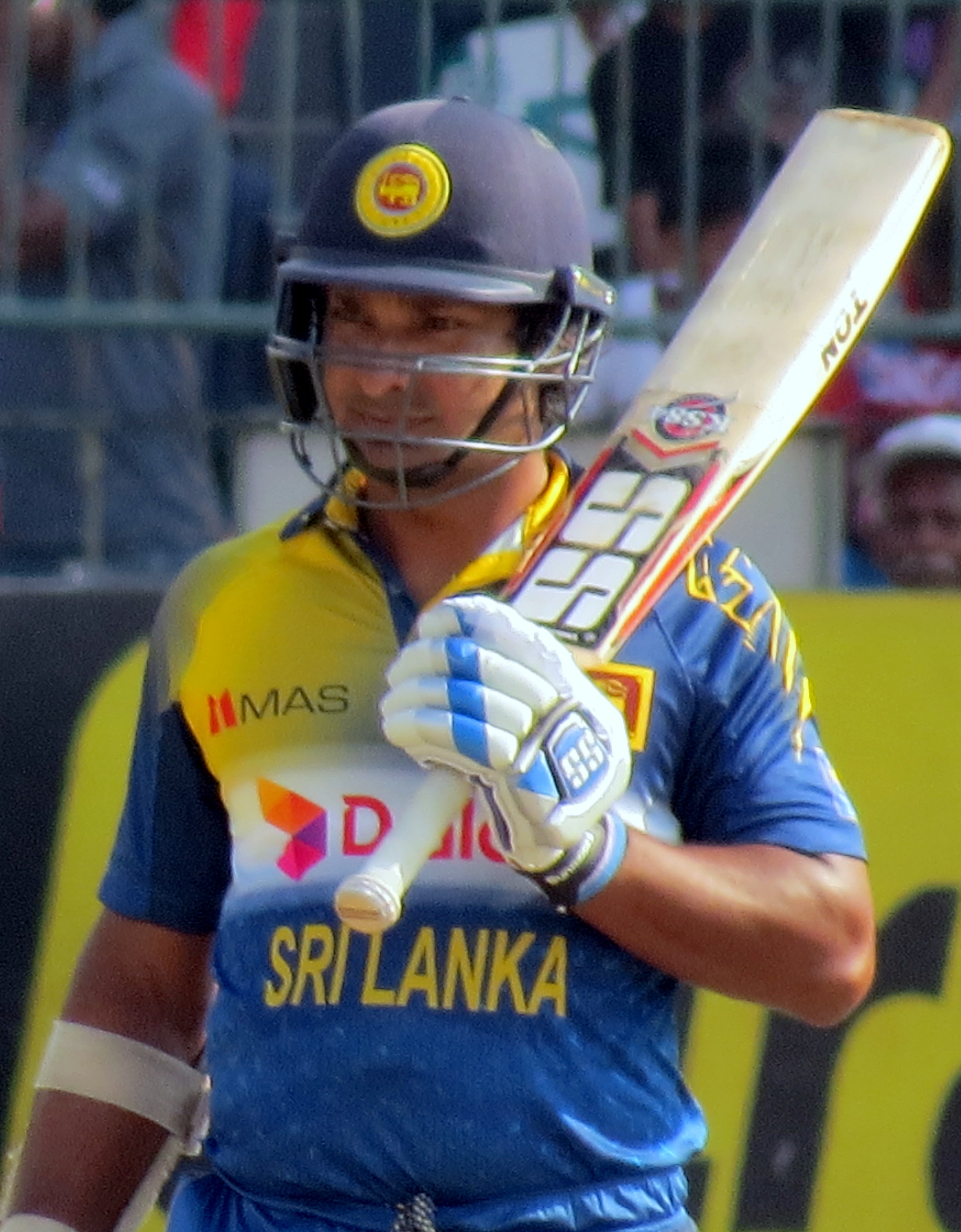
Kumar Sangakkara, recognised in 2012

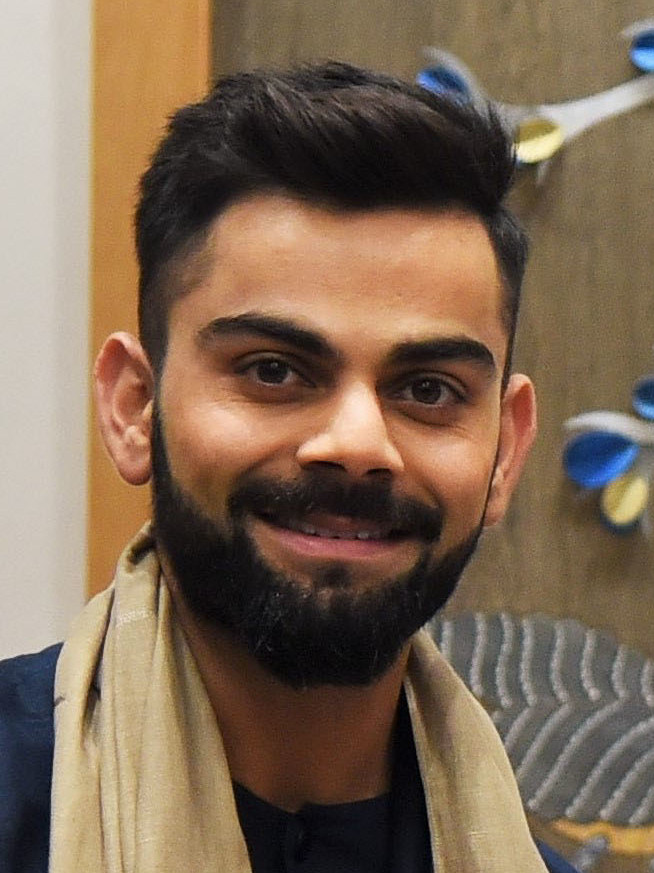
Virat Kohli, recognised in 2019

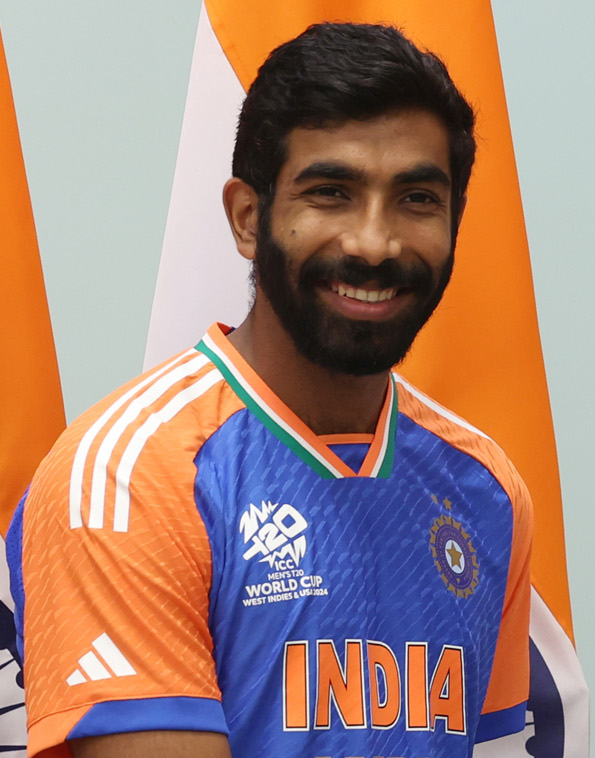
Jasprit Bumrah, recognised in 2022

Year	Recipient(s)				
1889	George Lohmann, Johnny Briggs, John Ferris, Charles Turner, Sammy Woods, Bobby Peel				
1890	Bobby Abel, Billy Barnes, Billy Gunn, Louis Hall, Robert Henderson, Maurice Read, Arthur Shrewsbury, Frank Sugg, Albert Ward				
1891	Jack Blackham	Gregor MacGregor	Dick Pilling	Mordecai Sherwin	Henry Wood
1892	William Attewell	J. T. Hearne	Frederick Martin	Arthur Mold	John Sharpe
1893	Herbie Hewett	Lionel Palairet	Walter Read	Stanley Scott	Andrew Stoddart
1894	George Giffen	Alec Hearne	Stanley Jackson	Harry Trott	Ted Wainwright
1895	Bill Brockwell	Jack Brown	C. B. Fry	Tom Hayward	Archie MacLaren
1896	W. G. Grace				
1897	Syd Gregory	Dick Lilley	Ranjitsinhji	Tom Richardson	Hugh Trumble
1898	Frederick Bull	Willis Cuttell	Frank Druce	Gilbert Jessop	Jack Mason
1899	Wilfred Rhodes	William Storer	Charlie Townsend	Albert Trott	William Lockwood
1900	Joe Darling	Clem Hill	Arthur Jones	Monty Noble	Robert Poore
1901	Tip Foster	Schofield Haigh	George Herbert Hirst	Tom Taylor	John Tunnicliffe
1902	Len Braund	Charlie McGahey	Frank Mitchell	Willie Quaife	Johnny Tyldesley
1903	Warwick Armstrong	Cuthbert Burnup	James Iremonger	Jim Kelly	Victor Trumper
1904	Colin Blythe	John Gunn	Albert Knight	Walter Mead	Plum Warner
1905	Bernard Bosanquet	Ernest Halliwell	James Hallows	Percy Perrin	Reggie Spooner
1906	David Denton	Walter Lees	George Thompson	Joe Vine	Levi Wright
1907	Jack Crawford	Arthur Fielder	Ernie Hayes	Kenneth Hutchings	Neville Knox
1908	Albert Hallam	Reggie Schwarz	Frank Tarrant	Bert Vogler	Thomas Wass
1909	Walter Brearley	Lord Hawke	Jack Hobbs	Alan Marshal	John Newstead
1910	Warren Bardsley	Sydney Barnes	Douglas Carr	Arthur Day	Vernon Ransford
1911	Harry Foster	Alfred Hartley	Charlie Llewellyn	Razor Smith	Frank Woolley
1912	Frank Foster	J. W. Hearne	Sep Kinneir	Phil Mead	Bert Strudwick
1913	John Wisden				
1914	Major Booth	George Gunn	Bill Hitch	Albert Relf	Lionel Tennyson
1915	Johnny Douglas	Percy Fender	Wally Hardinge	Donald Knight	Sydney Smith
1918	Harry Calder	John Firth	Clement Gibson	Gerard Rotherham	Greville Stevens
1919	Percy Adams	Percy Chapman	Adrian Gore	Lionel Hedges	Norman Partridge
1920	Andy Ducat	Patsy Hendren	Percy Holmes	Herbert Sutcliffe	Ernest Tyldesley
1921	Pelham Warner				
1922	Hubert Ashton	Jack Bryan	Jack Gregory	Charlie Macartney	Ted McDonald
1923	Arthur Carr	Tich Freeman	Charlie Parker	Jack Russell	Andy Sandham
1924	Arthur Gilligan	Roy Kilner	George Macaulay	Cec Parkin	Maurice Tate
1925	Bob Catterall	Jack MacBryan	Herbie Taylor	Dick Tyldesley	William Whysall
1926	Jack Hobbs				
1927	George Geary	Harold Larwood	Jack Mercer	Bert Oldfield	Bill Woodfull
1928	Roger Blunt	Charlie Hallows	Wally Hammond	Douglas Jardine	Vallance Jupp
1929	Les Ames	George Duckworth	Maurice Leyland	Sam Staples	Jack White
1930	Ted Bowley	Duleepsinhji	Tuppy Owen-Smith	Walter Robins	Bob Wyatt
1931	Donald Bradman	Clarrie Grimmett	Beverley Lyon	Ian Peebles	Maurice Turnbull
1932	Bill Bowes	Stewie Dempster	James Langridge	Nawab of Pataudi senior	Hedley Verity
1933	Ewart Astill	Freddie Brown	Alec Kennedy	C. K. Nayudu	Bill Voce
1934	Fred Bakewell	George Headley	Stan Nichols	Leslie Townsend	Cyril Walters
1935	Stan McCabe	Bill O'Reilly	George Paine	Bill Ponsford	Jim Smith
1936	Jock Cameron	Errol Holmes	Bruce Mitchell	Denis Smith	Arthur Wellard
1937	Charlie Barnett	Bill Copson	Alf Gover	Vijay Merchant	Stan Worthington
1938	Tom Goddard	Joe Hardstaff Jr	Len Hutton	Jim Parks Sr	Eddie Paynter
1939	Hugh Bartlett	Bill Brown	Denis Compton	Kenneth Farnes	Arthur Wood
1940	Learie Constantine	Bill Edrich	Walter Keeton	Brian Sellers	Doug Wright
1947	Alec Bedser	Laurie Fishlock	Vinoo Mankad	Peter Smith	Cyril Washbrook
1948	Martin Donnelly	Alan Melville	Dudley Nourse	Jack Robertson	Norman Yardley
1949	Lindsay Hassett	Bill Johnston	Ray Lindwall	Arthur Morris	Don Tallon
1950	Trevor Bailey	Roly Jenkins	John Langridge	Reg Simpson	Bert Sutcliffe
1951	Godfrey Evans	Sonny Ramadhin	Alf Valentine	Everton Weekes	Frank Worrell
1952	Bob Appleyard	Tom Dollery	Jim Laker	Peter May	Eric Rowan
1953	Harold Gimblett	Tom Graveney	David Sheppard	Stuart Surridge	Fred Trueman
1954	Neil Harvey	Tony Lock	Keith Miller	Johnny Wardle	Willie Watson
1955	Bruce Dooland	Fazal Mahmood	Eric Hollies	Brian Statham	George Tribe
1956	Colin Cowdrey	Doug Insole	Jackie McGlew	Hugh Tayfield	Frank Tyson
1957	Dennis Brookes	Jim Burke	Malcolm Hilton	Gil Langley	Peter Richardson
1958	Peter Loader	Arthur McIntyre	Collie Smith	Mickey Stewart	Clyde Walcott
1959	Les Jackson	Roy Marshall	Arthur Milton	John Reid	Derek Shackleton
1960	Ken Barrington	Donald Carr	Ray Illingworth	Geoff Pullar	M. J. K. Smith
1961	Neil Adcock	Ted Dexter	Roy McLean	Raman Subba Row	Vic Wilson
1962	Bill Alley	Richie Benaud	Alan Davidson	Bill Lawry	Norm O'Neill
1963	Don Kenyon	Mushtaq Mohammad	Peter Parfitt	Phil Sharpe	Fred Titmus
1964	Brian Close	Charlie Griffith	Conrad Hunte	Rohan Kanhai	Garfield Sobers
1965	Geoffrey Boycott	Peter Burge	Jack Flavell	Graham McKenzie	Bob Simpson
1966	Colin Bland	John Edrich	Dick Motz	Peter Pollock	Graeme Pollock
1967	Bob Barber	Basil D'Oliveira	Colin Milburn	John Murray	Seymour Nurse
1968	Asif Iqbal	Hanif Mohammad	Ken Higgs	Jim Parks junior	Nawab of Pataudi junior
1969	Jimmy Binks	David Green	Barry Richards	Derek Underwood	Ossie Wheatley
1970	Basil Butcher	Alan Knott	Majid Khan	Mike Procter	Don Shepherd
1971	Jack Bond	Clive Lloyd	Brian Luckhurst	Glenn Turner	Roy Virgin
1972	Geoff Arnold	Bhagwat Chandrasekhar	Lance Gibbs	Brian Taylor	Zaheer Abbas
1973	Greg Chappell	Dennis Lillee	Bob Massie	John Snow	Keith Stackpole
1974	Keith Boyce	Bevan Congdon	Keith Fletcher	Roy Fredericks	Peter Sainsbury
1975	Dennis Amiss	Mike Denness	Norman Gifford	Tony Greig	Andy Roberts
1976	Ian Chappell	Peter Lee	Rick McCosker	David Steele	Bob Woolmer
1977	Mike Brearley	Gordon Greenidge	Michael Holding	Viv Richards	Bob Taylor
1978	Ian Botham	Mike Hendrick	Alan Jones	Ken McEwan	Bob Willis
1979	David Gower	John Lever	Chris Old	Clive Radley	John Shepherd
1980	Joel Garner	Sunil Gavaskar	Graham Gooch	Derek Randall	Brian Rose
1981	Kim Hughes	Robin Jackman	Allan Lamb	Clive Rice	Vintcent van der Bijl
1982	Terry Alderman	Allan Border	Richard Hadlee	Javed Miandad	Rod Marsh
1983	Imran Khan	Trevor Jesty	Alvin Kallicharran	Kapil Dev	Malcolm Marshall
1984	Mohinder Amarnath	Jeremy Coney	John Emburey	Mike Gatting	Chris Smith
1985	Martin Crowe	Larry Gomes	Geoff Humpage	Jack Simmons	Sidath Wettimuny
1986	Phil Bainbridge	Richard Ellison	Craig McDermott	Neal Radford	Tim Robinson
1987	John Childs	Graeme Hick	Dilip Vengsarkar	Courtney Walsh	James Whitaker
1988	Jonathan Agnew	Neil Foster	David Hughes	Peter Roebuck	Saleem Malik
1989	Kim Barnett	Jeff Dujon	Phil Neale	Franklyn Stephenson	Steve Waugh
1990	Jimmy Cook	Dean Jones	Jack Russell	Robin Smith	Mark Taylor
1991	Mike Atherton	Mohammad Azharuddin	Alan Butcher	Desmond Haynes	Mark Waugh
1992	Curtly Ambrose	Phillip DeFreitas	Allan Donald	Richie Richardson	Waqar Younis
1993	Nigel Briers	Martyn Moxon	Ian Salisbury	Alec Stewart	Wasim Akram
1994	David Boon	Ian Healy	Merv Hughes	Shane Warne	Steve Watkin
1995	Brian Lara	Devon Malcolm	Tim Munton	Steve Rhodes	Kepler Wessels
1996	Dominic Cork	Aravinda de Silva	Angus Fraser	Anil Kumble	Dermot Reeve
1997	Sanath Jayasuriya	Mushtaq Ahmed	Saeed Anwar	Phil Simmons	Sachin Tendulkar
1998	Matthew Elliott	Stuart Law	Glenn McGrath	Matthew Maynard	Graham Thorpe
1999	Ian Austin	Darren Gough	Muttiah Muralitharan	Arjuna Ranatunga	Jonty Rhodes
2000	Chris Cairns	Rahul Dravid	Lance Klusener	Tom Moody	Saqlain Mushtaq
2001	Mark Alleyne	Martin Bicknell	Andy Caddick	Justin Langer	Darren Lehmann
2002	Andy Flower	Adam Gilchrist	Jason Gillespie	V. V. S. Laxman	Damien Martyn
2003	Matthew Hayden	Adam Hollioake	Nasser Hussain	Shaun Pollock	Michael Vaughan
2004	Chris Adams	Andrew Flintoff	Ian Harvey	Gary Kirsten	Graeme Smith
2005	Ashley Giles	Steve Harmison	Rob Key	Andrew Strauss	Marcus Trescothick
2006	Matthew Hoggard	Simon Jones	Brett Lee	Kevin Pietersen	Ricky Ponting
2007	Paul Collingwood	Mahela Jayawardene	Mohammed Yousuf	Monty Panesar	Mark Ramprakash
2008	Ian Bell	Shivnarine Chanderpaul	Ottis Gibson	Zaheer Khan	Ryan Sidebottom
2009	James Anderson	Dale Benkenstein	Mark Boucher	Neil McKenzie	Claire Taylor
2010	Stuart Broad	Michael Clarke	Graham Onions	Matt Prior	Graeme Swann
2011	Tamim Iqbal	Eoin Morgan	Chris Read	Jonathan Trott	Not awarded
2012	Tim Bresnan	Alastair Cook	Glen Chapple	Alan Richardson	Kumar Sangakkara
2013	Nick Compton	Hashim Amla	Jacques Kallis	Dale Steyn	Marlon Samuels
2014	Shikhar Dhawan	Charlotte Edwards	Ryan Harris	Chris Rogers	Joe Root
2015	Moeen Ali	Gary Ballance	Adam Lyth	Angelo Mathews	Jeetan Patel
2016	Jonny Bairstow	Brendon McCullum	Steve Smith	Ben Stokes	Kane Williamson
2017	Ben Duckett	Younis Khan	Misbah-ul-Haq	Toby Roland-Jones	Chris Woakes
2018	Shai Hope	Heather Knight	Jamie Porter	Natalie Sciver	Anya Shrubsole
2019	Tammy Beaumont	Rory Burns	Jos Buttler	Sam Curran	Virat Kohli
2020	Jofra Archer	Pat Cummins	Simon Harmer	Marnus Labuschagne	Ellyse Perry
2021	Zak Crawley	Jason Holder	Mohammad Rizwan	Dom Sibley	Darren Stevens
2022	Jasprit Bumrah	Devon Conway	Ollie Robinson	Rohit Sharma	Dane van Niekerk
2023	Tom Blundell	Ben Foakes	Harmanpreet Kaur	Daryl Mitchell	Matthew Potts
2024	Harry Brook	Ashleigh Gardner	Usman Khawaja	Mitchell Starc	Mark Wood
2025	Gus Atkinson	Liam Dawson	Sophie Ecclestone	Jamie Smith	Dan Worrall
2026	Shubman Gill	Haseeb Hameed	Ravindra Jadeja	Rishabh Pant	Mohammed Siraj

== See also ==
- Wisden Leading Cricketer in the World
- Wisden Leading Woman Cricketer in the World
- Six Giants of the Wisden Century
- Wisden Australia's Cricketer of the Year
- Wisden Cricketers of the Century
