= Jack Brown (cricketer) =

English cricketer

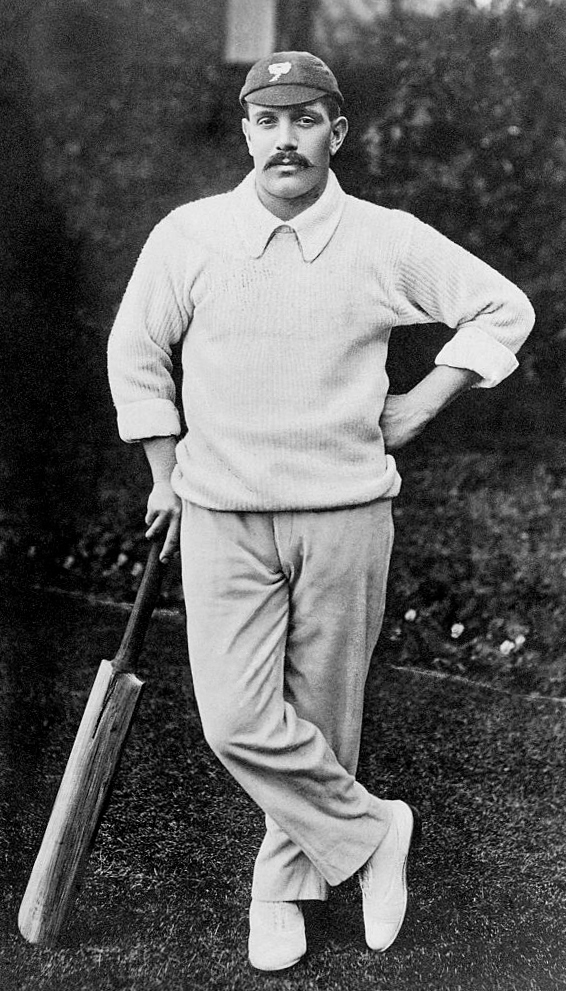
- Brown in the 1890s

Cricket information
- Batting: Right-handed
- Bowling: Leg-break

International information
- National side: England
- Test debut: 14 December 1894 v Australia
- Last Test: 1 July 1899 v Australia

Career statistics
Competition	Test	First-class
Matches	8	383
Runs scored	470	17,920
Batting average	36.15	30.52
100s/50s	1/1	29/76
Top score	140	311
Balls bowled	35	9,391
Wickets	0	190
Bowling average	–	29.61
5 wickets in innings	–	4
10 wickets in match	–	0
Best bowling	–	6/51
Catches/stumpings	7/–	230/–
- Source: CricInfo, 20 August 2021

John Thomas Brown (20 August 1869 – 4 November 1904) was an English professional cricketer, who played primarily as a batsman. He was Yorkshire's first great opening batsman, a lineage continued by Herbert Sutcliffe, Len Hutton and Geoffrey Boycott. He took five wickets in an innings on three occasions with his leg breaks, but except in 1901 (when he claimed 57 wickets) he generally bowled little.

Another John Thomas Brown was a cricketer who played, less frequently, for Yorkshire over a similar time span. The subject of this article is often described as Brown, J. T. (Driffield), the other as Brown, J. T. (Darfield).

== County career ==
Born in Driffield, Yorkshire, Brown made his first-class debut for Yorkshire County Cricket Club in 1889. Here he formed a successful opening partnership with John Tunnicliffe. From 1895 to 1903, he passed 1,000 runs each season, and in 1897 made his highest score of 311, against Sussex at Bramall Lane, following it up with 300 the following year against Derbyshire at Chesterfield. In this match he added 554 for the first wicket with Tunnicliffe, which was then a record partnership for any wicket. He shared 19 century stands with Tunnicliffe in all. He is the only batsman to have scored two triple hundreds for Yorkshire. In 1900, he made 163 to help the Players to a startling two-wicket victory over the Gentlemen, successfully chasing a huge target of 501.

== International career ==
Brown's form in 1894 was such to earn him both a mention as a Wisden Cricketer of the Year in 1895, and a Test debut against Australia at Sydney in 1894/95. He kept his place for all five Test matches, and after England has suffered a crushing innings defeat in the fourth Test (also at Sydney) the teams went into the fifth and final Test at Melbourne with the series level at 2–2. Needing 297 to win, England fell to 28/2, but then Brown and Albert Ward put on 210 before Brown was out for 140, his only Test century. Brown reached his 50 in 28 minutes – still a record – and 100 in 91, then the fastest Test century. England won the game by six wickets and the Ashes 3–2. He was the first batsman in test history to score a test century in the 4th innings of a test match

Brown played only three more Tests, all against the Australians – two in 1896 and one in 1899 – although many judges (not least Wisden) felt that he was unlucky not to be selected for the 1897/98 Ashes tour. He continued to bat productively for Yorkshire for several more seasons, but in 1904 he played just two matches, both in May, against Cambridge University and Leicestershire before a heart condition forced his retirement.

== Death ==
Brown's health continued to worsen, and later that year he died in a medical home in Pimlico, London at the age of 35. Heavy smoking had contributed to asthma and heart problems. The cause of death was given as heart failure and "congestion of the brain".
