= John Tunnicliffe =

English cricketer

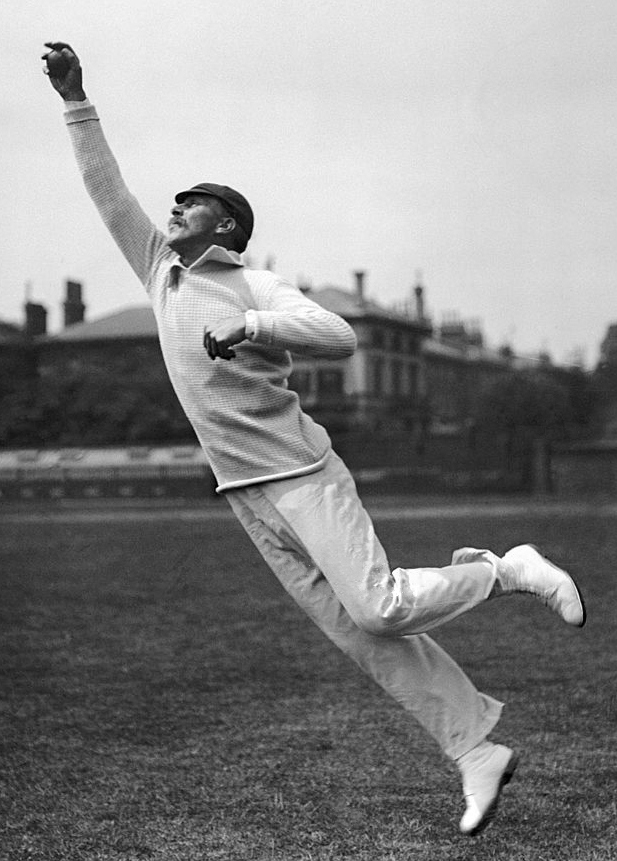
- Tunnicliffe photographed in about 1905 by George Beldam

Personal information
- Born: 26 August 1866; Pudsey, Yorkshire, England
- Died: 11 July 1948 (aged 81); Westbury Park, Bristol, England
- Batting: Right-handed
- Bowling: Right-arm slow

Domestic team information
- Years: Team
- 1891–1907: Yorkshire

Career statistics
Competition	First-class
Matches	498
Runs scored	20,310
Batting average	27.00
100s/50s	23/107
Top score	243
Balls bowled	718
Wickets	7
Bowling average	57.85
5 wickets in innings	0
10 wickets in match	0
Best bowling	1/6
Catches/stumpings	694/–
- Source: CricketArchive, 2 August 2012

John Tunnicliffe (26 August 1866 – 11 July 1948) was an English, first-class cricketer, who played in 472 first-class matches for Yorkshire County Cricket Club.

== County career ==
Tunnicliffe was born at Low Town in Pudsey, Yorkshire. He was a tall, forceful right-handed opening batsman, and on his figures one of the best slip fielders of all time. A late starter in first-class cricket, he was a regular in the Yorkshire team from 1893 and, between 1895 and 1907, scored 1,000 runs in every season except 1903. His best year was 1898, when he scored 1,804 runs at an average of 41.00 runs per innings. That season he made his highest score, contributing 243 in a then-record partnership for any wicket of 554 with Jack Brown against Derbyshire at Queen's Park, Chesterfield. That stand is still the third highest for the first wicket, and the sixth highest for any wicket, in first-class cricket worldwide. Tunnicliffe was named as a Wisden Cricketer of the Year in 1901.

Almost as important to Yorkshire as his batting was Tunnicliffe's slip fielding. Nicknamed "Long John of Pudsey", he had long arms that enabled him to bring off catches others would not have attempted. In 498 first-class matches, he took 695 catches. In a few of his early games in 1891 and 1892, he appeared to have acted as wicket-keeper, but thereafter he was at slip. His 70 catches in the 1901 season was a record that stood until Wally Hammond caught 79 in 1928. His ratio of catches to matches is 1.393:1, which compares favourably with both Hammond (1.291:1) and John Langridge (1.365:1).

Tunnicliffe scored 20,310 first-class runs at an average of 27.00, and with his occasional bowling took seven wickets at 57.85.

== Retirement and death ==
Tunnicliffe retired after the 1907 season, and became cricket coach at Clifton College. He later served on the Gloucestershire County Cricket Club committee when his son was the county secretary.

He died in Westbury Park, Bristol in July 1948, aged 81.
