= English cricket team in South Africa in 1905–06 =

International cricket tour

English cricket team in South Africa 1905-06
- Date: 1 December - 2 April
- Location: South Africa
- Result: South Africa won the 5-Test series 4-1
Teams
- South Africa: England
Captains
- Percy William Sherwell: Pelham Francis Warner
Most runs
- Gordon Charles White (437) Arthur William Nourse (289) Louis Joseph Tancred (192): Frederick Luther Fane (342); John Neville Crawford (281); Albert Edward Relf (229)
Most wickets
- Sibley John Snooke (24) James Hugh Sinclair (21) Reginald Oscar Schwarz (18): Walter Scott Lees (26); Colin Blythe (21); John Neville Crawford (9)

The England cricket team toured South Africa under the auspices of the Marylebone Cricket Club from December 1905 to March 1906. There were five Test matches, and seven first-class games against South African provincial teams. While the team won a number of their first-class matches, they also lost several, and South Africa won the Test series 4 to 1.

== England squad ==
- PF Warner (Middlesex) (captain)
- FL Fane (Essex)
- JN Crawford (Surrey)
- EG Wynyard (Hampshire)
- LJ Moon (Middlesex)
- JC Hartley (Sussex)
- HDG Leveson-Gower (Surrey)
- D Denton (Yorkshire)
- S Haigh (Yorkshire)
- EG Hayes (Surrey)
- WS Lees (Surrey)
- C Blythe (Kent)
- AE Relf (Sussex)
- JH Board (Gloucestershire) (wk)

Jack Mason of Kent was MCC's first choice as captain, but he was unable to take the time away from his law practice. George Dennett of Gloucestershire was also invited to tour, but Gloucestershire refused to permit him to tour out of fear it would affect his bowling for the county.

== Warm up matches ==
=== Western Province against the MCC ===
Between 1 December 1905 and 12 December, The MCC played two first-class matches against Western Province at Cape Town cricket ground. The MCC made 365, choosing to bat having won the toss. PF Warner (56) D Denton (78), FL Fane (60) and AE Relf (61*) all made half-centuries while Whitehead took the best figures of the home team's bowlers with 6/100. In response, the hosts were quickly removed for 96 with Schofield Haigh taking 5/29, the pick of the MCC's bowlers. Forced to follow on, Western Province were bowled out for 142, with a five-wicket haul for Crawford.

After four days of rest, the MCC and Western Provinces came together once more at the same ground, and on this occasion the home team won the toss and chose to bat. They were unable to make a solid start, however, being bowled out for 81 with nine batsmen scoring only single figures, and with the innings extras (six) outscoring six of their batsmen. The MCC responded with 272 all out, with half centuries for Relf (60) and wicket keeper LJ Moon (57). Western Province then scored 233 with scores of 80 and 74 for SJ Snooke and SE Horwood, Crawford taking six wickets for the MCC. Despite this innings, the MCC required only 43 runs to win, and Warner together with fellow opener EG Wynyard made the runs without loss.

=== Transvaal ===
On Boxing Day, the MCC played a 3-day match against Transvaal at Johannesburg. Choosing to bat first, Transvaal were bowled out for 135 with Walter Lees taking five wickets. In response, MCC gained a lead of 130 with their innings of 265 supported largely by a 132* from Denton. Transvaal scored 305 in response, with half-centuries for WA Shalders (66) and GA Faulkner (63). MCC needed 176 to win, but three wickets for Faulkner and a five-wicket haul for Schwarz meant that MCC made only 115, giving Transvaal victory by 60 runs.

== First-class matches ==
=== Army v MCC ===
The South African Army faced the MCC for a three-day match on an army camp in Pretoria between the first and second Test matches on 12 January. Batting first, the MCC declared on 480 built from a 130 from Denton, and half-centuries from LJ Moon (80), Sir Henry Leveson-Gower (67*) and Crawford (54). In response, the Army were bowled out for 97, with P Mitford making 65 of their total. Following on, the Army reached 165 thanks to a 68 from FA Macfarlan, and a 32 from JA Davenport, however they were still 218 runs short, giving the MCC victory by an innings and 218 runs.

=== Natal v MCC ===
The MCC then played a three-day match against Natal in Durban. Losing the toss, the MCC were forced to bowl as Natal reached 191, largely due to a century from Nourse (119). The MCC then stumbled 17 short of Natal's target when they were bowled out for 175, Denton top scoring with 53 and Nourse taking five wickets to go with his century. Natal then made 159 to take their lead to 176, with Blythe taking five wickets for the MCC. Chasing the target, the MCC lost early wickets to leave them 38/4, however an unbeaten 77 from Fane and some lower-order runs from Haigh took them to victory by four wickets, despite Nourse taking four more wickets to leave him with a tally of nine for the match to go with his 119 from the first innings.

Two days later, Natal met the MCC in Pietermaritzburg for a second three-day match. Winning the toss, the MCC inserted Natal and bowled them out for 117 on the first day, however they were only able to take a slender lead when they were in turn bowled out for 191 despite a 59 from Fane, with Hime taking five wickets. Natal were then limited to 173 by a seven-wicket-haul from Haigh, allowing the MCC to chase down their target of 100 runs with four wickets remaining.

=== Eastern Province v MCC ===
The final match of the tour for the MCC saw them meet the Eastern Province cricket team at Port Elizabeth on 20 February. The hosts batted first, however the MCC bowled them out for 132 with Hartley taking 6/32. The MCC then reached 201 despite being at one time 30/3 with both Denton and Fane out for ducks, as Crawford (64) and Wynyard (54) made good preparation for the remaining Test matches with half-centuries. The hosts were then run through by Blythe (5/30) and (4/34) and left 92 all out, leaving the MCC with 24 runs to win, which they reached for no loss.

== Test series ==
=== 1st Test ===
2–4 January 1906
Scorecard

England	v	South Africa
184 (63 overs); JN Crawford 44; RO Schwarz 3/72 (21 overs)		91 (46.1 overs); SJ Snooke 19; WS Lees 5/34 (23.1 overs)
190 (58.5 overs); PF Warner 51; GA Faulkner 4/26 (12.5 overs)		287/9 (112.5 overs); AW Nourse 93*; WS Lees 3/74 (33 overs)

South Africa won by 1 wicket
Old Wanderers, Johannesburg
Umpires: J Phillips (AUS) and FE Smith (ENG)

- England won the toss and elected to bat.
- FL Fane, EG Hayes, JN Crawford and WS Lees (all ENG), and GC White, SJ Snooke, GA Faulkner, AEE Vogler, RO Schwarz and PW Sherwell (all SA) made their Test debuts.
- This was South Africa's first test cricket victory.

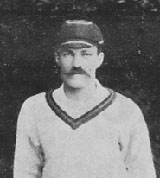
Percy Sherwell, who led the South African Test team

England and South Africa faced each other for the first Test at Johannesburg on 2 January 1906. A four-day match, it was the first in a five-Test series, and Test match debut for six South African and four English players. The toss, like the match, was overseen by umpires J Phillips and FE Smith from Australia and England respectively, and was won by England, who chose to bat.

The first innings began poorly, with England struggling to 15/3 before a 29 from Wynward, a 20 from EG Hayes on debut and a 44 from JN Crawford, also on debut, saw them to 147/8. Late blows by debutant Lees and C Blythe took them to 184 all out. The South African innings, however, began with similar setbacks, as they reached 44/7. The first six of the match from AEE Vogler, a South African Test debutant, helped see them to 91; however this was still 94 runs behind England's total.

Thus England began her second innings with a lead of 94, which was increased to 149 for the loss of two wickets thanks in part to a half-century from Warner (51). Only Crawford showed any resistance out of the rest of the batting lineup, however, with 42, and England were all out for 190 setting South Africa a target of 284 runs to win the match. While this was higher than any score reached thus far in the match, South Africa made the target with one wicket to spare thanks to a four-hour knock of 81 by GC White in his second Test match innings, and a score of 93* from AW Nourse. South Africa, therefore, took the lead 1.0 in the five-match series.

=== 2nd Test ===
6–8 March 1906
Scorecard

England	v	South Africa
148 (66.2 overs); LJ Moon 30; JH Sinclair 3/35 (25 overs)		277 (100.2 overs); JH Sinclair 66; S Haigh 4/64 (19.2 overs)
160 (70.5 overs); FL Fane 65; RO Schwarz 4/30 (14.5 overs)		33/1 (10.5 overs); LJ Tancred 18*; WS Lees 1/16 (4 overs)

South Africa won by 9 wickets
Old Wanderers, Johannesburg
Umpires: J Phillips (AUS) and FE Smith (ENG)

- England won the toss and elected to bat.
- LJ Moon (ENG) made his Test debut.

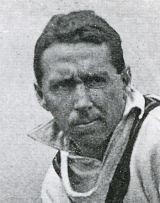
GC White, South Africa's top run scorer during the series

South Africa led the series 1:0 by the time of the second Test at Johannesbury on 6 March. Officiated by the same umpires, England won the toss and chose to bat, handing a debut to LJ Moon. Three wickets each to Sinclair and Faulkner, however, held England at 148 all out and South Africa were batting by the end of the first day, and by the second day they were 277 all out thanks to a half-century from South African Sincliar (66) and 4/64 from England's Haigh.

England began their second innings poorly, with the top three batsmen dismissed for single figures they reached 19/3, which soon became 25/4 when Moon was out for a duck. A 65 from Fane combined with a 30 and 37 from Wynyard and Relf respectively helped England limp to 160 all out, leaving South Africa a target of only 32 runs. While Lees removed South African opener WA Shalders for a duck, South Africa had no further difficulty taking a nine-wicket victory.

=== 3rd Test ===
10–14 March 1906
Scorecard

South Africa	v	England
385 (118.3 overs); CMH Hathorn 102; WS Lees 6/78 (31.3 overs)		295 (101.2 overs); FL Fane 143; SJ Snooke 4/57 (21.2 overs)
349/5d (101 overs); GC White 147; WS Lees 3/85 (26 overs)		196 (78.4 overs); D Denton 61; SJ Snooke 8/70 (31.4 overs)

South Africa won by 243 runs
Old Wanderers, Johannesburg
Umpires: J Phillips (AUS) and FE Smith (ENG)

- South Africa won the toss and elected to bat.
- 11 March was taken as a rest day
- JC Hartley (ENG) made his Test debut.

The third Test at Johannesburg began on 10 March, and England handed a Test debut to JC Hartley as they lost the toss and were given the ball as South Africa chose to bat first. The hosts reaped the rewards of first use of the pitch, amassing 338 runs in the first day, and reaching 385 all out on the second day thanks to a century from CMH Hathorn (102) and a half-century from Nourse (61), despite the best efforts of Lees 6/78 and Blythe 2/72.

In reply, England managed 295 thanks largely to 143 from Fane, no other batsman passing 36, with the South Africa bowlers Snooke (4/57) and Schwarz (4/67) taking the majority of the wickets. Another century followed in South Africa's second innings from White (147) supported by a knock of 73 from opener and captain LJ Tancred and a 55 from Nourse combining to give them a second inning score of 349. Left with a large target of 440 to win, England staggered to 75/5 before Denton's 61 and Crawford's 34 helped England limp to 171/7. Sooke, who finished with figures of 8/70, removed the remaining batsmen to leave England all out for 196 and give South Africa a 243 run victory to take an unassailable 3:0 lead in the series.

=== 4th Test ===
24–27 March 1906
Scorecard

South Africa	v	England
218 (97.3 overs); SJ Snooke 44; C Blythe 6/68 (32 overs)		198 (89.5 overs); JN Crawford 36*; JH Sinclair 4/41 (27 overs)
138 (59.5 overs); GC White 73; C Blythe 5/50 (28.5 overs)		160/6 (59.1 overs); FL Fane 66*; JH Sinclair 3/67 (26.1 overs)

England won by 4 wickets
Newlands, Cape Town
Umpires: F Hearne (SA) and J Phillips (AUS)

- South Africa won the toss and elected to bat.
- 25 March was taken as a rest day.

England entered the fourth Test at Cape Town with no chance victory with the series 3:0 with two to play. Losing the toss, England were given the ball and a six-wicket haul for Blythe helped restrict South Africa to 218. England were not, however, able to take a lead with their innings of 198 falling 20 runs short, with Sinclair and Faulkner taking four wickets each.

South Africa began their second innings with a 20 run lead, however Blythe and Crawford reduced them to 28/2, and despite a 73 from White South Africa were bowled out for 138 thanks to a five-wicket haul from Blythe, and four wickets for Lees. Seven South African batsmen were dismissed for single figure scores, and England needed only 159 runs to win. Despite losing both openers for four runs and reeling at 34/3, a partnership between Moon (28) and Fane (66*) helped England to victory by four wickets. This took the series to 3:1.

=== 5th Test ===
30 March–2 April 1906
Scorecard

England	v	South Africa
187 (65.2 overs); JN Crawford 74; JH Sinclair 4/45 (21.2 overs)		333 (110.4 overs); AEE Vogler 62*; AE Relf 3/40 (21 overs)
130 (49.2 overs); LJ Moon 33; AW Nourse 4/25 (10 overs)

South Africa won by an innings and 16 runs
Newlands, Cape Town
Umpires: F Hearne (SA) and J Phillips (AUS)

- England won the toss and elected to bat.
- 1 April was taken as a rest day

The fifth and final Test took place in Cape Town on 30 March. With the series at 3:1 to South Africa, England could not affect the result, however they began well by winning the toss and choosing to bat. A 4/45 from Sinclair, however, restricted England to 187 all out, with Crawford's 74 the only half-century. South Africa surpassed England with a score of 333 all out, thanks to Snooke (60) and a rapid 62 in 75 minutes from AEE Vogler, the last-wicket partnership being worth 94.

England were bowled out in their second innings for 130, 16 runs short of South Africa's score. Moon and Relf, with scores of 33 and 21 respectively, were the only batsmen to pass 20, five were out for single figures and the extras outscored nine of England's batsmen. Four wickets for Nourse and three for Schwarz helped seal South Africa's victory by an innings and 16 runs, taking the Test series 4:1.
