= South African cricket team in England in 1907 =

International cricket tour

South Africa in England in 1907
	South Africa	England
- Dates: 20 May – 11 September 1907
Captains	Percy Sherwell	R. E. Foster

Test series
- Result: England won the 3-match series 1–0
Most runs	Percy Sherwell (154)	C. B. Fry (221)
Most wickets	Bert Vogler (15)	Colin Blythe (26)

The South African national cricket team toured England during the 1907 cricket season, playing three Tests and twenty four first-class matches. South Africa's quartet of bowlers, Reggie Schwarz, Aubrey Faulkner, Bert Vogler and Gordon White were praised for the quality of their googly bowling, and two of the four—Schwarz and Vogler—were recognised as Wisden Cricketers of the Year the following year.

Although the tour was the fourth the South Africans had made to England, it was the first to include Test matches; England won the three-match series 1–0. Across the whole tour, South Africa won 21 of their 31 matches and drew many plaudits.

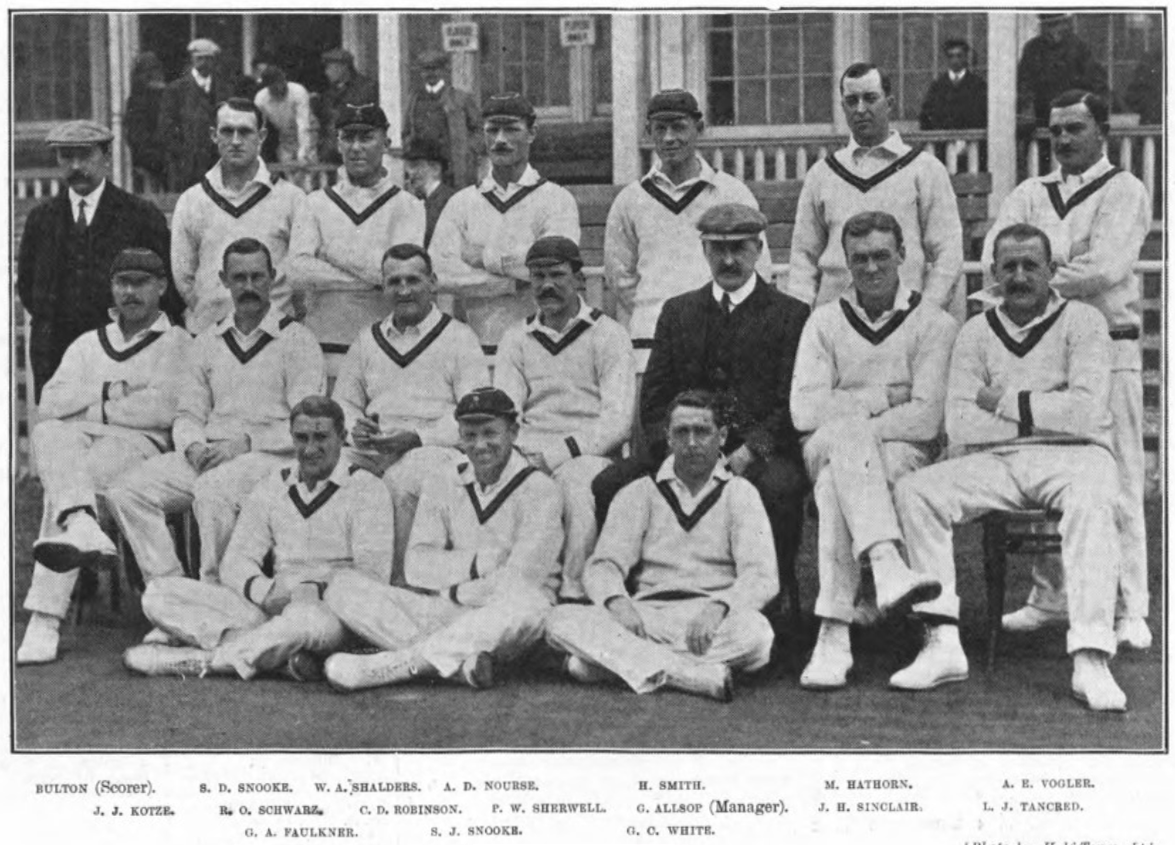
The South African team that toured England in 1907.

== Test series ==
=== 1st Test ===
Batting first, England batted for the whole of the first day to reach their total of 428. Len Braund was the top-scorer for the hosts, scoring 104 with "the utmost patience and judgement", while Gilbert Jessop scored a quick 93 runs late in the day. Wisden identified Bert Vogler, who took seven wickets, as the best of the bowlers, spinning the ball in both directions and varying his pace effectively. In their reply, only two of the South African batsmen made significant scores—Dave Nourse and Aubrey Faulkner—no other players reached double figures. In a three-day match, Foster asked the South Africans to follow on, as they still trailed by 288 runs at the close of the first innings, but they recovered and batted with more resolve in their second innings. Led by their captain, Percy Sherwell, who scored 115 runs, South Africa finished the second day on 185 for 3, still trailing England by 103 runs. On the third day, it began raining just as the umpires were walking out onto the pitch in the morning, and got heavier later, making it impossible to play any cricket, and the match was accordingly drawn. On each of the first two days over 17,000 people attended the match.

1–3 July
Scorecard

England	v	South Africa
428 (127.2 overs); Len Braund 104; Bert Vogler 7/128 (47.2 overs)		140 (65 overs); Dave Nourse 62; Ted Arnold 5/37 (22 overs)
		185/3 (58 overs); Percy Sherwell 115; Colin Blythe 2/56 (21 overs)

Match drawn
Lord's, London
Umpires: Arthur Millward and Archibald White

- England won the toss and elected to bat.

=== 2nd Test ===
England once again won the toss and chose to bat in the second Test, but in contrast to the first match, they made few runs. Only three batsmen reached double figures—Tom Hayward, Johnny Tyldesley and George Hirst—as Faulkner took six wickets for the tourists, getting prodigious turn in both directions with his spin bowling. The pitch was soft and difficult to bat on due to the rain, and after lunch nine of England's wickets were lost in under an hour. England were weakened due to their decision to pick a pace bowler, Neville Knox, over a spinner, Jack Crawford, who would have been better suited to the conditions. Accordingly, England relied on Colin Blythe, who bowled for the entire innings and collected eight wickets. Nevertheless, partially due to a number of dropped catches, South Africa scored 110 to lead by 34 runs.

England began their second innings on the evening of the first day, and had reached 25 runs without loss by the close. On the second day, rain showers in the morning meant that the players were on and off the pitch a number of times, and no play was possible at all after lunch, by which time the score had moved on to 110 for 4, of which C. B. Fry had scored 54. Rain continued to disrupt play on the third day, and the condition of the pitch made batting extremely difficult; England only scored 52 more runs, leaving South Africa needing 129 runs to win. The South Africans lost wickets quickly and regularly on the final day, being at one stage 18 for 5. Despite a good partnership between Faulkner and Tip Snooke, they were all out for 75, granting England victory by 53 runs. Blythe once again bowled for the entire innings, collecting another seven wickets, giving him match figures of 15 for 99.

29–31 July
Scorecard

England	v	South Africa
76 (36.3 overs); Tom Hayward 24; Aubrey Faulkner 6/17 (11 overs)		110 (31.5 overs); Percy Sherwell 26; Colin Blythe 8/59 (15.5 overs)
162 (49.4 overs); C. B. Fry 54; Gordon White 4/47 (16 overs)		75 (44.4 overs); Jimmy Sinclair 15; Colin Blythe 7/40 (22.4 overs)

England won by 53 runs
Headingley, Leeds
Umpires: John Carlin and John Moss

- England won the toss and elected to bat.

=== 3rd Test ===
Wisden identified the third Test as featuring the best cricket of the three matches, partially due to the better weather. For the third time, England won the toss and batted, and were led by a century from Fry and a half-century from the captain, R. E. Foster. Although England made a respectable total, their batting was criticised for being inconsistent, and the South African bowling praised as being difficult. Due to rain breaks, England batted until the middle of the afternoon on the second day to reach their 295. When South Africa came in to bat, the conditions were difficult as the pitch was drying, but partially due to some inaccurate bowling from Blythe, the batsmen were able to score runs. Tip Snooke top-scored with 63 runs, while Nourse, Jimmy Sinclair and William Shalders all scored twenty or more. Blythe bowled far better on the final morning to dismiss South Africa for 178, leaving England a 117-run lead.

England lost three early wickets in their second innings, but their middle order rallied, and they reached 138, despite both Schwarz and Vogler getting a lot of movement with their bowling. South Africa needed 256 runs in two hours and forty minutes to secure an unlikely victory. Their captain, Sherwell, announced that they would give it a go, and the opening batsmen, Sinclair and Faulkner began well, moving the score to 61 runs after 35 minutes. Three wickets from Hirst restricted the South Africans, but further attacking batting from the South Africans entertained the crowds until the match was stopped due to poor light, resulting in a draw.

19–21 August
Scorecard

England	v	South Africa
295 (112 overs); C. B. Fry 129; Reggie Schwarz 3/45 (27 overs)		178 (63.3 overs); Tip Snooke 63; Colin Blythe 5/61 (20.3 overs)
138 (54.3 overs); R. E. Foster 35; Bert Vogler 4/49 (14.3 overs)		159/5 (40.3 overs); Aubrey Faulkner 42; George Hirst 3/42 (13 overs)

Match drawn
The Oval, London
Umpires: Walter Richards and William West

- England won the toss and elected to bat.
