= Golden age of cricket =

Period of English cricket from 1890-1914

The "Golden Age" of cricket is a nostalgic term that has often been applied in cricket literature to the period in English cricket from 1890, the opening season of the official County Championship, to the outbreak of World War I which occurred just before the scheduled end of the 1914 season. The term has also gained currency in Australian cricket of the same period and in America in reference to the Philadelphian cricket team.

== Nostalgia ==
The period became infused with a nostalgic yearning, ostensibly because the teams played according to "the spirit of the game". More poignantly, the nostalgia was due to the loss of life in the Great War and a hankering for those happier times before the war's outbreak. A number of cricketers were killed or wounded during the war, the deaths including eight Test players: Colin Blythe, Major Booth and Kenneth Hutchings of England; Tibby Cotter of Australia; Reginald Hands, Bill Lundie, Reggie Schwarz and Gordon White of South Africa. The war years also saw the deaths of W. G. Grace and Victor Trumper, who both succumbed to illness in 1915.

Cricket of the period did feature numerous great names such as Grace, Trumper, Blythe, Wilfred Rhodes, Jack Hobbs, C. B. Fry, Ranjitsinhji and Frank Woolley, but that in itself is not unique as any period in cricket history can boast its great players. As David Frith pointed out, the nostalgia "needed someone to put a perspective on it". In his 1939 autobiography, Fry wrote: "I have a notion that the cricket of the nineties and early nineteen hundreds was more amusing to watch, but I am not at all sure that the game of today is not more difficult to play".

== In Australia ==
In Australian cricket, the period is another "golden age". Cricket writer Jack Pollard wrote: "The golden age of cricket has always been regarded as the period between 1890 and 1914. For in all those years all the skills of the game flowered and an unprecedented array of great batsman and bowlers delighted informed and appreciative galleries. More importantly the players of that time set standards for sportsmanship that lifted cricket above other games and established it as a character-builder and an integral part of the social scene".

Writer Gideon Haigh said of Australian batsman Victor Trumper: "If it is possible for a cricketer to be their period, rather than merely part of it, then Trumper is the "Golden Age" of cricket. In the gaiety and gallantry of his strokeplay, the charm of his personality, even in his frailty, transience and suddenness of death, Trumper personifies what we understand as the values and nature of his time".

== Test cricket ==
Test cricket between England and Australia was well established by the time the Australians visited England in the 1890 season. The two countries played 15 series between 1890 and 1914 including the 1912 Triangular Tournament, in which South Africa took part. It was during the "Golden Age" that Test cricket first achieved its hegemony over other forms of cricket.

England's captains against Australia were W. G. Grace, Andrew Stoddart, Archie MacLaren, Plum Warner, Stanley Jackson, A. O. Jones, Frederick Fane, Johnny Douglas, and C. B. Fry. Australia's captains against England were Billy Murdoch, Jack Blackham, George Giffen, Harry Trott, Joe Darling, Hugh Trumble, Monty Noble, Clem Hill and Syd Gregory.

South Africa had played their first Test in 1888–89, but initially they were very weak; up to 1898–99 they had played eight Tests against England and lost them all. They played Australia for the first time in 1902–03 and had the limited satisfaction of avoiding defeat in one of the three matches. However, in 1905–06, they won a series against England by four matches to one, thanks partly to the emergence of four googly bowlers: Reggie Schwarz, Bert Vogler, Aubrey Faulkner, and Gordon White. Schwarz had learnt how to bowl the googly from its originator, Bernard Bosanquet, while in England and had passed on the secret to the others. On South Africa's next tour of England, in 1907, they narrowly lost the Test series one-nil with two matches drawn, but in 1909-10 won by three matches to two. After that, however, their results declined, although the 1910–11 series in Australia was competitive.

== Philadelphian cricket ==
The period also saw the brief flowering of Philadelphian cricket. Three tours were undertaken to England during which the team played on level terms with the leading counties. The Philadelphians played ten important matches on their final tour in 1908, winning four and losing six. This tour was notable for the outstanding bowling of Bart King, who took 87 wickets and topped the England bowling averages with 11.01 runs per wicket. This was not bettered until 1958 when Les Jackson of Derbyshire posted an average of 10.99.

== See also ==
- History of Test cricket from 1890 to 1900
- History of Test cricket from 1901 to 1914
