= Early life of Jack Hobbs =

Hobbs batting early in his career

Sir John Berry "Jack" Hobbs (16 December 1882 – 21 December 1963) was an English professional cricketer who played for Surrey from 1905 to 1934 and for England in 61 Test matches between 1908 and 1930. Born into poverty in Cambridge, Hobbs displayed little distinction as a cricketer until relatively late in life. After some limited early success, he began to aspire to a career in professional cricket, and a sudden improvement in 1901 made this more likely. Following the death of his father, the whole family depended on Hobbs but he was supported by Tom Hayward, a professional cricketer who played for Surrey. Hayward arranged for Hobbs to have a trial at Surrey, and after he was successful, Hobbs spent two years qualifying to play County Cricket.

Hobbs was immediately successful when he made his debut for Surrey, but his batting form went into decline in the rest of his first season. However, he established himself in the following seasons as one of the best and most promising professional batsmen in England. He was chosen to tour Australia with an England team in 1907–08, and retained his place in the team when England next played Test matches in 1909. While successful, it was not until Hobbs toured South Africa in 1909–10, where he established his dominance over the feared South African googly bowlers, that he established himself fully at Test level. By the time of his next series, in Australia in 1911–12, he was regarded by critics as the best batsman in the world and scored three centuries in the series. He maintained his position as the world's leading batsman until war broke out in 1914. Hobbs established a very effective opening partnership with Wilfred Rhodes at Test level, and another with Hayward for Surrey. By 1914, Hobbs was batting in a very aggressive, attractive manner that he would never recapture again when his career resumed after the war.

== Early life ==
=== Childhood ===
Hobbs was born in Cambridge on 16 December 1882, the eldest of 12 children born to John Cooper Hobbs, a slater, and his wife Flora Matilda Berry. Hobbs was born in a cottage belonging to his maternal grandfather, situated in a poor, run-down area of the town, but the family moved into their own home shortly after his birth. However, throughout his childhood, Hobbs' family remained in poverty, and conditions for the working class in Cambridge were poor. Hobbs later wrote that, although he had a happy childhood, he had envied those who lived a more privileged life in Cambridge's more affluent areas and his childhood experiences left him with a sense of inferiority. The family moved house several times during this period.

Hobbs' father had a great love of cricket and his performances playing for a short-lived club formed by him and his colleagues led to an offer of employment as a professional cricketer at Fenner's, the cricket ground of Cambridge University. His main duties were umpiring matches on the ground and bowling in the cricket nets to undergraduates. Although the pay was poor, Hobbs senior was happy to have achieved his lifetime ambition of a career in cricket. In 1889, he was appointed to the more prestigious position of groundsman and umpire at Jesus College, where Hobbs junior was able to watch cricket practice and occasionally become involved, although he received little formal coaching from his father, who was reluctant to exploit his position. Nevertheless, Hobbs soon acquired a love of cricket from his father. Hobbs later claimed that his father rarely coached him, but his mother once recounted that Hobbs senior "trained him carefully since he was old enough to hold a bat". From an early age, Hobbs played cricket whenever he could and his first games were played in the streets near his house. He and his father frequently discussed the game and Hobbs closely followed local cricket.

Hobbs was educated at a primary school affiliated with his local Anglican church, St Matthew's. In 1891, he moved to York Street Boys' School, where in contrast to his previous school, his family had to pay fees for him to attend. He later wrote that he was a poor scholar but was more successful at sports. Both he and his mother later recounted that he was rarely in trouble at home or school, except when carrying out practical jokes. He was also heavily involved in St Matthew's Church, and was a member of the church choir. Although his first appearance in a cricket match was as a last minute substitute playing for Jesus College choir, he played regularly for the St Matthew's choir team, which he went on to captain, and the York Street school team. He was also a founder member of a team called the Ivy Club which played on Parker's Piece. During holidays, he helped his father at work on the Jesus College ground. In his final year at York Street, in order to supplement the family budget, he took a job working before school hours in the domestic service of a private house where his duties mainly involved cleaning. When he left school in 1895, Hobbs initially worked as an errand boy before his father's connections at the university helped him to get a summer job as a college servant, chiefly assisting the cricket team. Then, aged 16, he began a potentially more permanent career working as an apprentice gas fitter.

He continued to practise hard, batting in the mornings and evenings on Parker's Piece; the cricket pitches here were poor quality and some critics have attributed Hobbs' later success to his formative years on difficult batting pitches. Even so, he did not stand out as a cricketer at this time, in contrast to other successful batsmen who excelled from an early age. No coaches or teams approached him and he was 18 years old before hitting his first century. Hobbs later admitted that he was a slow developer, and there seemed little realistic prospect at this time of him pursuing a career as a professional cricketer like his father, although he continued to harbour the hope.

=== Development as a cricketer ===
Hobbs' breakthrough came in 1901, and he began to believe he could succeed as a cricketer. His batting improved throughout the season, during which he appeared for two local sides, Ainsworth and the Cambridge Liberals. Appearing for the former against the latter, he scored 102, his first century. His performances in the season meant that he was picked for an annual charity match played between a team representing Cambridge and a team of professional cricketers brought by the Cambridge-born Surrey cricketer Tom Hayward. Hobbs was a last minute replacement, and although he scored just 26 not out, was comfortable playing against the professionals; Hobbs was delighted that he could compete at a higher level, and he began to understand the best way to bat effectively. At the end of the season, he was invited to play as an amateur for Cambridgeshire, even though his record in club cricket was unremarkable. He was not particularly successful, reaching double figures just once, but his experiences in the season increased his determination to pursue a career in cricket.

Early in 1902, Hobbs successfully applied for the job of assistant professional at Bedford School, which he held throughout the summer term. The work mainly consisted of working as a groundsman and bowling in the nets, which left him exhausted and unhappy. Living away from home from the first time and working in a public school environment left him feeling socially out of his depth and he did not enjoy his cricketing duties, although he later admitted that the cricketing strength of the school improved his own batting. In late August, Hobbs returned to Cambridge to play as a professional for the first time. For a fee of ten shillings, he appeared for a team from the nearby town of Royston against Hertfordshire Club and Ground. Appearing in his highest level of cricket to date, Hobbs scored 119. His success delighted his family and made him a local celebrity. Hobbs' father had helped to arrange his appearance in the match but was already seriously ill with pneumonia, and he died a week after his son scored his century, on 3 September 1902. His death left his wife and children facing great financial hardship.

Given the local reputation and respect for Hobbs senior, a local committee formed to raise money to support his family. To this end, a fundraising match was organised on Parker's Piece. Tom Hayward brought a team of well-known professionals, including several of his Surrey team-mates; the match was a resounding financial success and went a long way to easing any financial difficulties for the Hobbs family. Hobbs assumed his father's duties as groundsman at Jesus college in the winter of 1902–03. While working there, one of his colleagues and a friend of his father, F. C. Hutt, got in contact with Hayward to ask him to arrange a trial for Hobbs, with a view to joining Surrey. Consequently, in late 1902, Hayward and Bill Reeves, an Essex cricketer born in Cambridge, bowled at Hobbs on Parker's Piece and he impressed Hayward. Hobbs and Hutt were not certain that anything would come of this, and Hutt wrote to Essex asking for a trial, but the county never replied.

=== Surrey cricketer ===
Hobbs (right) opening the batting with Tom Hayward in 1907

Hobbs was summoned to a trial at Surrey in April 1903; after batting in the nets, he was chosen to appear in two trial matches in which he made scores of 37 and 13. The Surrey secretary subsequently offered him a position on the ground staff at the Oval with a basic wage of 30 shillings per week during the season. (Note: On top of this, Hobbs received match fees. During the winter, he received a retainer of one pound per week. At the time, the average weekly wage was 28 shillings.) Hayward also persuaded the secretary to include a £10 at the end of the 1903 season to further support the Hobbs family. Hobbs could not immediately play for Surrey owing to the qualification rules in place at the time for the County Championship. To appear for a county, a player had to be born in that county or to have lived there for two years. To this end, Hobbs moved to London; he later wrote how much he enjoyed living in the city. He shared lodgings with a fellow Surrey youth player. Around this time he played football for local teams as a forward with some success. However, he struggled financially during the winter months despite the off-season pay provided by Surrey. In common with other Surrey cricketers at the time, Hobbs struggled to find employment outside of the cricket season.

While qualifying, Hobbs played for Surrey's Colts side and for the "Club and Ground" Eleven, both of which were teams for young Surrey cricketers. He made some substantial scores, including 86 runs in his first match for the Club and Ground, but according to Hobbs' biographer, Leo McKinstry, "Just as he had done for much of his early life, [Hobbs] performed satisfactorily without doing anything startling". He scored 480 runs at an average of 34.29, as well as taking 19 wickets as his bowling improved. The following season, Hobbs played only for the Club and Ground, increased his average to 43.90, and impressed people connected with Surrey. Hobbs' sudden improvement brought about his return to the Cambridgeshire team. He impressed many critics with his batting, particularly when he scored 195 and 129 in two matches against Hertfordshire. In total, he scored 696 runs in 13 innings for Cambridgeshire, averaging 58.00. Wisden Cricketers' Almanack, in its review of Cambridgeshire's season, commented: "A new player in Hobbs rendered fine services as a batsman and came out with a remarkable average."

== First-class cricketer ==
=== Debut season ===
Hobbs qualified for Surrey by the beginning of the 1905 cricket season. At this time, Tom Hayward was Surrey's opening batsman but lacked a regular opening partner; following the retirement of Bobby Abel, several batsmen had been tried without success. At the time, Hobbs had only rarely opened the batting and had not done so for Cambridgeshire. Nor was Hobbs guaranteed a place in the team as Surrey had a large playing staff with great competition for places. Even so, the cricketing press regarded Hobbs as very promising, as did Tom Hayward. When Hayward captained Surrey in their opening game of the season—the regular, amateur Surrey captain was absent—he ensured that Hobbs played in the game against a team representing the "Gentlemen of England". With none of the recognised opening batsmen available for the match, Hayward took Hobbs out to open the batting. Making his debut on 24 April 1905, Hobbs scored 18 runs in the first innings and a quick-scoring 88 in the second before rain ensured the match was drawn. Several of those who played in the game were impressed, including W. G. Grace, the captain of the opposing team, and the press commented favourably on his performance. Following the game, the Surrey secretary, C. W. Alcock, called Hobbs into his office to congratulate him on his debut.

The official Surrey captain, Lord Dalmeny, assumed control of the team for the following match against Essex, the club's opening County Championship match, beginning on 4 May. Hobbs retained his place and scored 155 runs in around three hours during Surrey's second innings. Hobbs later held the catch which won the game for Surrey and he was cheered from the ground by the crowd. Lord Dalmeny awarded Hobbs his County Cap as the players left the field; it was very unusual for a player to be awarded a cap so quickly. Press reports over the following days recognised that he was potentially a very good player. Hobbs maintained his form over the following weeks; he scored another century against Essex and hit 94 runs against the touring Australian cricket team. However, from the beginning of June he was generally less successful. Although he scored 75 not out against Middlesex and 58 in a second match against the Australians, his next best score in the remainder of the season was 38. He struggled to cope with a variety of bowlers and began to despair of scoring runs. The fatigue of playing cricket up to six days each week affected his batting, while in contrast to his subsequent career, his fielding was criticised by spectators and journalists. To attempt to recapture his form, Surrey tried Hobbs in different positions in the batting order and occasionally left him out of the side, but nothing helped.

In all first-class cricket in the season, Hobbs scored 1,317 runs at an average of 25.82, including two centuries and four other scores over fifty. This placed him ninth in the Surrey batting averages. McKinstry describes this as "a sound if hardly electrifying start." As an occasional medium-paced bowler, he took six wickets. Reviewing Surrey's season, Wisden singled Hobbs out for attention, praising his early-season form but noted how tiredness had affected him; it suggested that he was the best professional batsman Surrey had found for a long time. The Times noted that, although performing well, Hobbs had fallen short of the standards suggested by his start. Hobbs proved generally popular with his team-mates, and established a reputation as a practical joker which he maintained through his career. However, according to McKinstry, at least one member of the team was less impressed and tried to undermine Hobbs by spreading gossip that he had insulted the captain while drunk.

=== Growing reputation ===
Hobbs spent the winter of 1905–06 practising his batting and fielding. Consequently, he displayed greater consistency in 1906. He scored 85 in the opening game of the season against the Gentlemen of England and maintained his form throughout the season. Displaying a wider range of shots, he scored four centuries, including another against Essex, and established an effective opening partnership with Hayward, who set a record for the highest aggregate of runs in a season. The pair shared a succession of substantial partnerships, although Hayward was very much the dominant partner. Hobbs later acknowledged Hayward's influence and inspiration to him at this time. In total, Hobbs scored 1,913 runs at an average of 40.70 with a highest score of 162, placing him second in the Surrey averages. Wisden praised his improved fielding and commented that he was "one of the best professional bats of the year" and noted that he was likely to get even better. Surrey climbed to third place in the County Championship but faced criticism for their recruitment of Hobbs; the press suggested that it was unethical for counties to include players from outside their boundaries and suggested that the club's perseverance with Hobbs stemmed from a wish to justify signing him.

Following his marriage and honeymoon in the winter of 1906–07, Hobbs made further advances as a batsman in 1907. Unusually frequent rain during the season—Wisden described the season as the wettest ever—meant that pitches often favoured bowlers. Hobbs adapted his batting technique to suit the conditions, improving his defence and developing a method of playing off the back foot—with his weight transferred backwards rather than towards the ball. After beginning the season in uncertain form, he began to bat with great consistency. Showing more control of off side shots, he batted through an entire innings against Warwickshire on a pitch damaged by rain that was difficult to bat on, shared four century partnerships with Hayward in the same week in June, and hit 150 in the home match against Warwickshire in an innings praised by critics. These performances brought him to the attention of the Marylebone Cricket Club (MCC) selectors, and he was chosen for the Players in the prestigious Gentlemen v Players matches in July. He was unsuccessful in both games; in the first, at Lord's Cricket Ground, he scored 2 and 9 before being dismissed in both innings by the fast bowler Walter Brearley, and in the match at the Oval, he scored 5 and 19. (Note: In the first innings at the Oval, he was dismissed by Johnny Douglas, who went on to take Hobbs' wicket more times than any other bowler in first-class cricket.) Some commentators criticised Hobbs after these matches and suggested that he should bat more defensively as he was too cavalier in his batting.

Hobbs scored a further three centuries in the season, and was selected to play in a Scarborough Festival match against the touring South African team. The South African googly bowlers had caused consternation among English batsmen that summer, and the googly threatened to change the nature of cricket. Against these bowlers, Hobbs scored 78, although as Ronald Mason writes, it was on "a bone-hard wicket against tired bowlers ... an enjoyment rather than a business". By the end of the season, Hobbs had scored 2,135 runs, averaging 37.45. He was one of only three men to pass 2,000 runs; he was second to Hayward in the Surrey averages, and eighth in the national averages. Wisden noted his improvement, the increase in the range of his strokes, particularly on the off side, and noted that "no one among young professional batsmen looks to have such a bright future before him."

== Test match cricketer ==
=== First tour to Australia ===
In August 1907, during the cricket season, Hobbs was selected to tour Australia with an MCC team—at the time, England teams toured under the name and badge of the MCC. (Note: Throughout Hobbs' career, the MCC organised and administered English cricket. Official English touring teams always played under the name of MCC and were only styled "England" during Test matches.) Hobbs later remarked that until the improvement in his batting, he simply aimed to play for Surrey, but he realised during 1907 that a place in the England team was achievable. However, his chances of selection were increased through the rejection by four leading professional cricketers, including Hayward, of the financial terms offered for the tour. In addition, several amateur batsmen including C. B. Fry were either not asked to tour or proved unavailable. It was acknowledged at the time, and by subsequent writers, that the team was not a strong one given the quality of English cricket at the time. Even so, Hobbs was not a certain choice; the influential Archie MacLaren was critical of his batting at the time, and Hobbs may have owed his selection to the support of the Surrey amateur H. D. G. Leveson Gower.

Having overcome initial reservations about leaving his wife and newly born son, Hobbs accepted the invitation but throughout the voyage to Australia was severely affected by sea-sickness, a condition which was to afflict him throughout his life. To allow him to recover from his illness upon arrival in Australia, Hobbs missed the first two games of the tour, but once recovered, he played in only two of the remaining four fixtures before the Test series began. Hobbs later expressed the belief that the MCC captain, Arthur Jones was instrumental in his omission from the team as he did not rate Hobbs a good player. He also believed that Jones did not give him a chance to prove himself. But Hobbs failed with the bat on his two appearances and was subsequently left out of the team for the first Test match. Even when Jones was taken ill before the game started, George Gunn, not a member of the touring team but present in Australia, was preferred to Hobbs and scored a century in the game. However, England lost the game and the performance of the amateur wicketkeeper and makeshift opening batsman Dick Young was singled out as detrimental to the team. Following effective batting performances by Hobbs in two matches after the Test, Frederick Fane, the stand-in England captain, chose Hobbs to open the batting in the second Test. He made his Test debut on 1 January 1908 at Melbourne. He went in to bat on the second day after Australia had scored 266; in 182 minutes, he scored 83 runs in his first innings and although he batted more slowly than usual, critics praised his defence. Eventually, England needed 282 to win. Hobbs and Fane added 54 for the first wicket; before Hobbs fell for 28 but England went on to win the match by one wicket.

Hobbs retained his place for the rest of the series. In the third Test, he scored 26 and 23, although he was forced to retire hurt in the latter innings. In the fourth match, he scored 57 on a pitch badly affected by rain, adopting a policy of attacking the bowling and hitting 10 fours. The MCC team manager commented on Hobbs' excellent technique and judgement in the difficult batting conditions. He concluded his series with an innings of 72 in the final game, but could not prevent a third successive English defeat—the home side won the five-match series 4–1. Hobbs had scored 302 runs at an average of 43.14. In other first-class matches, Hobbs scored centuries against Tasmania and Victoria, totalling 876 runs at 41.71. The MCC manager praised Hobbs after the tour, but Hobbs himself did not enjoy the tour. He found the travelling tiring and felt very homesick.

=== Continued success ===
Although batting conditions were generally better in 1908 than the previous season, Hobbs scored fewer runs. Even so, he achieved a batting average over 40 in the County Championship and scored six centuries for Surrey. One such century came in an innings of 106 on an extremely difficult pitch, which caused the ball to spin and bounce excessively, against the bowling of Colin Blythe, regarded as extremely effective in such conditions. In the Gentlemen v Players match, Hobbs scored 81, in contrast to his lack of success during his first appearance. On the other hand, he struggled against Yorkshire, the County Champions that year, scoring 33 runs in four innings against the team. In all first-class games, Hobbs scored 1,904 runs at 37.33. For his achievements that season, Hobbs was chosen as one of Wisden's Cricketers of the Year. The citation noted that "at the present time there is perhaps no better professional batsman in England except Hayward and Tyldesley".

Hobbs began the 1909 season with a succession of large scores. In his second game, he scored a hundred before lunch on the first day against Hampshire. He eventually reached 205, his maiden double-hundred, sharing a partnership of 371 in 165 minutes with Ernie Hayes, albeit on an easy batting pitch against a team lacking effective bowlers. In the following game, Hobbs scored 159 against Warwickshire and shared an opening partnership of 352 with Hayward, then top-scored in the first innings of Surrey's victory over the touring Australian team. Surrey then played Warwickshire again, and Hobbs scored a century in each innings before hitting 99 against Essex in the next match. Such form placed him in contention for a place in the England team to play Australia, but the strength of English batting at the time meant that he was not a certainty. Furthermore, the England captain, Archie MacLaren, remained unconvinced that Hobbs possessed the required quality. However, the Surrey captain, Leveson-Gower, was a selector that year. He persuaded the committee to include Hobbs in the squad, then convinced a reluctant MacLaren to play him in the team. (Note: The player who was left out for Hobbs' inclusion was his colleague and supporter Tom Hayward.)

In the first Test, played at Edgbaston, Hobbs opened the batting with MacLaren but was dismissed, from the first ball he received, by Charlie Macartney for a duck. However, the match was a low-scoring one on a pitch which made batting difficult, and Australia left England needing 105 to win. The task was not easy in the conditions, but Hobbs, this time opening the batting with C. B. Fry, hit 62 not out. He scored quickly off all the bowlers and England passed the target without losing a wicket. This innings meant that he had scored 919 runs before the end of May, but he failed to emulate W. G. Grace's achievement of scoring 1,000 runs in May when Nottinghamshire batted throughout the day when Surrey played them on 31 May. England lost the second Test by nine wickets, their team much changed to the bafflement of critics and spectators, and Hobbs scored just 19 and 9. The home side also lost the third Test. Hobbs scored 12 and 30, the latter the highest score of the innings, but was involved in controversy in the first innings when he appeared to change his mind when about to walk off after apparently hitting his own wicket. The umpire ruled him not out, to the fury of the Australians who loudly protested for some time. Hobbs was out to a very straightforward delivery almost immediately after; some critics, including the Australian captain, believed he allowed himself to be dismissed because he thought the umpire was wrong, but Hobbs later wrote that the incident unsettled him and he lost concentration.

In his next game, Hobbs badly injured his finger and missed the remainder of the Test series; in three games, he scored 132 runs at an average of 26.40. England lost the series when the remaining two matches were drawn. Hobbs struggled to regain his form when he recovered from the injury and his scoring was inconsistent, but he still finished the season with 2,114 runs at 40.65. However, nearly half of those runs came in the first month of the season, and he passed 40 only four times in his last 20 innings. Surrey also had a difficult season, falling from third to fifth and losing the services of three players including the amateur Jack Crawford following internal disciplinary issues.

=== Dominance in South Africa ===
McKinstry notes that, by the end of the 1909 season, Hobbs had not really established himself at international level and his career "seemed in danger of stagnating". Invited to tour South Africa that winter with the MCC, Hobbs had no hesitation in accepting, needing to support his family financially. However, a tour to South Africa was not prestigious; many leading cricketers were missing from the touring team and others were selected who were a long way from the first-choice eleven. The team faced a challenging tour, playing on matting pitches, with which English players were unfamiliar, and against the South African googly bowlers, who had caused tremendous difficulties for English batsmen both in 1907 and particularly on their home pitches on the last MCC tour in 1905–06. The leading players had found no answer to the four South African googly bowlers; critics and analysts believed a new batting method was needed to defeat the relatively new delivery. In the absence of other players, Hobbs was expected to be the leading batsman on the tour.

When the tour began, local press disregarded Hobbs on the evidence of his first practice sessions on matting pitches, but he subsequently scored centuries in the first two matches, including one in a first-class match. Hobbs was chosen for the first Test against South Africa; the MCC captain, Leveson-Gower, selected Wilfred Rhodes to open the batting with him. Rhodes, who began his career as a bowler who batted down the batting order but steadily improved his batting until he became an opening batsman, went on to establish a successful opening partnership with Hobbs in the years until the First World War. A particular hallmark of their association was quick running between the wickets, and when they batted on the first day in response to a South African total of 208, they immediately began to score singles by pushing the ball just past nearby fielders and running quickly. The tactic was initially a response to the difficulty of facing the bowlers on a matting pitch, but was successful as they added 159 runs for the first wicket. Hobbs scored 89 in the first innings and 35 in the second, and although England lost narrowly, he appeared much more comfortable than the other English batsmen against the googly. Hobbs and Rhodes followed up with a partnership of 207 in the match following the Test, and Hobbs scored 163. England also lost the second Test, but Hobbs continued to impress critics; he scored 53 and 70, sharing two substantial opening partnerships of 94 and 48 with Rhodes in the process. The failure of the other batsmen, defeated by the googly bowlers, caused consternation in the English press. As England had few effective pace bowlers on the tour, Hobbs opening the bowling in the first two Tests, as well as the batting.

Hobbs failed in the first innings of the third Test, batting down the order owing to illness. In the second innings, he scored 93 not out in 130 minutes, batting at number five in the order, and despite another failure by the other English batsmen, guided England to a three-wicket victory. He received a rapturous welcome from the crowd and his team-mates. However, the series was lost when England were defeated in the fourth match; Hobbs scored 0 and 1, the only time in his Test career that he failed to reach double figures in either innings, and his worst return in first-class cricket. Then in the final game of the series, he scored his first Test hundred, opening the batting and sharing a partnership of 221 with Rhodes which was a record at the time for the first wicket in Test matches. Hobbs batted for 225 minutes in total and scored 187, an innings praised by Wisden for its "brilliancy". Later, he once more opened the bowling, dismissing Reggie Schwarz, his only Test wicket. England won the match by nine wickets and the series finished 3–2.

Hobbs scored 1,124 first-class runs at an average of 66.11 on the tour, while in the Test matches, he scored 539 runs at 67.37. Wisden commented: "Beyond everything else from the English point of view the feature of the trip was the superb batting of Hobbs, who easily adapted himself to the matting wickets and scored from the famous googly bowlers with amazing skill and facility. When they came home the other members of the team could not say too much in his praise." Syd Gregory, an Australian Test batsman who was visiting South Africa, described Hobbs as the best batsman in the world in a press interview following the series. His success against the googly arose from either reaching a long way forward or stepping back near his stumps in order to play the ball;this meant that he either smothered the ball so that it did not spin or allowed him time to see which way it would spin and play accordingly. He also adopted cautious tactics, preferring to wait for an easy delivery to hit for runs rather than play aggressively; the orthodox approach at the time was to attempt to hit googly bowling aggressively. Hobbs also demonstrated an ability to judge very effectively where the ball would land after it had been bowled. This judgement, allied to an instinctive knowledge of what the bowler was trying to do and an increasing ability to judge from the bowler's wrist allowed him to predict when a googly had been bowled. As such, he encountered far fewer difficulties than other batsmen in playing googly bowling. According to Ronald Mason, after Hobbs' success, the South African googly bowlers were never as effective.

=== Leading batsman in England ===
As the leading batsmen of the previous decade fell into decline, Hobbs' success in South Africa meant he was, according to McKinstry, "beyond dispute, seen as the finest batsman in the country". However, a combination of a wet summer, the effects of switching from matting pitches to grass ones, and tiredness from having played cricket for 18 months without a substantial break meant that Hobbs record was poor in 1910. He did not enjoy the season owing to fatigue and scored 1,982 runs at an average of 33.03, the lowest average of his career apart from his first season. He was more effective during 1911, after a long rest during the winter. The summer was hot and dry, leading to better batting pitches. Although Hobbs played few outstanding innings, he was consistently successful, and scored 2,376 runs at 41.68. Bowling more frequently than in other seasons, Hobbs also took 28 wickets. Against Oxford University, Hobbs bowled throughout the second innings to take seven wickets for 56 runs, the best figures of his career. While Hobbs may have been frequently dismissed having scored between 40 and 70 runs, his best innings were played in the most pressurised games. In the Gentlemen v Players match at Lord's, Hobbs carried his bat through the second innings for 154 in 195 minutes against a varied bowling attack, containing highly regarded bowlers, on a very difficult pitch; the next highest score was 41 and the team were bowled out for 292.

=== Success in Australia ===
Hobbs was an automatic selection for the MCC tour of Australia in the winter of 1911–12, and in previewing the series, former Australian captain Harry Trott saw Hobbs as the key batsman. Hobbs once more suffered from sea-sickness on the journey, even travelling by land to meet the team's ship at Marseilles to reduce his time on the water. After scoring 43 when the team stopped in Colombo on the way, Hobbs and the MCC arrived in Australia in October 1911. The side faced immediate difficulties when their captain, Pelham Warner became seriously ill shortly after scoring 151 in the opening game. Warner named Johnny Douglas his replacement as leader, a decision which pleased the team and Hobbs, an admirer of Douglas, in particular. However, several leading batsmen struggled for form in the opening games, including Hobbs. Affected by sunstroke, Hobbs highest score, and only fifty, in seven innings before the Tests began was 88. Nor did Douglas' captaincy convince Australian critics at first. Problems continued during the first Test, which Australia won by 146 runs, and Douglas faced severe criticism of his leadership. Hobbs scored 63 in the first innings, although by his own admission he did not play well, and 22 in the second. Although Rhodes was in the team, he did not open the batting owing to his poor form, and Hobbs opened with Septimus Kinneir.

For a time following the Test defeat, Douglas' position was under threat. Douglas met with Hobbs and two other senior professionals to discuss how he could improve as captain, and Warner summoned Hobbs and the leading professionals to his sickbed to discuss the captaincy. Several thought Douglas should be replaced but Hobbs argued in his favour and Douglas remained in the post following a vote. England went on to win the second Test; after bowling Australia out for 184 in the first innings, the visiting team faced a target of 219 to win in the fourth innings. Hobbs and Rhodes, restored to the opening position, began with a partnership of 57. Hobbs scored 126 not out, his first century against Australia, and scored particularly well from the bowling of Ranji Hordern, a googly bowler who had taken 12 wickets in the first Test. Wisden commented that Hobbs "played one of the finest innings of his life", and England won by eight wickets. Australia were once more bowled out for a low score in the third Test; this time Hobbs and Rhodes added 147 for the first wicket and Hobbs scored 187. Clem Hill, the Australian captain, attempted to slow the scoring through the placement of his field, a tactic Hobbs combated by careful placement of the ball past the fielders. Hobbs played more attacking cricket after passing 100, scoring more quickly but making more mistakes. The intense heat also affected him and he was exhausted when finally dismissed. England reached a total of 501 and won the match by seven wickets. The press praised Hobbs and the Manchester Guardian noted that the batsmen seemed to have finally conquered the googly.

Australia, already behind in the series, faced disruption within the team before the fourth Test when Hill, the captain, came to blows with Peter McAlister, the chairman of selectors, over a dispute regarding the control of the Australian team. Then in damp conditions, Australia were bowled out for 191 in their first innings. At the end of the first day, Hobbs and Rhodes had scored 54 together, and the next day they took their partnership for the first wicket to 323, setting a new record for the highest partnership for any wicket in Test matches. Their partnership remained an overall Test record for 22 years and the highest for the first wicket until 1948. As of 2012, this remains England's highest opening partnership against Australia. The pair scored easily from the bowling but faced criticism for slow batting. Even so, Hobbs reached a century in 133 minutes and proceeded to play more aggressively afterwards. He was dismissed for 178 after batting for four-and-a-half hours. The press and players praised the partnership and in particular the quality of the running between the wickets. England reached a total of 589 and bowled Australia out for 173 to win the match by an innings and regain the Ashes. In a speech following the game, Hill identified the batting of Hobbs as the crucial factor in the English victory. England also won the final Test to take the series 4–1; Hobbs scored 32 and 45, sharing a partnership of 76 with Rhodes in the second innings.

Hobbs ended the series with an aggregate of 662 runs at an average of 82.75, setting a new record number of runs for an individual batsman in a Test series. Jack Crawford, now living in Australia, was struck by the improvement in Hobbs since they had played together at Surrey, noting that he seemed to possess no weaknesses. In his review of the tour, Warner said: "I have long since exhausted my vocabulary of praise in favour of Rhodes and Hobbs, and, thanks in a very large degree to their superlative work, our batting was eminently successful. Too much stress cannot be laid on what they accomplished, for in innings after innings they gave us a wonderful start. They were the backbone of the batting." In addition, Hobbs ran out 15 batsmen and Warner praised his fielding at cover point. The Australians did not dare run when he fielded the ball for fear of the speed of his throw. In all first-class matches, Hobbs scored 943 runs at 55.47.

=== Triangular tournament ===
The 1912 season was unusually wet, which caused many games to be rained off and produced some very difficult batting wickets. For Surrey, Hobbs was as successful as in previous years. Surrey had a poor season and Wisden remarked that Hobbs did not bat as well for his county as for his country. His batting approach also differed from that which he adopted for England; he tried to attack at all times and attempted shots he dare not risk in a Test. Consequently, he lost his wicket on several occasions trying to score quickly, and the press criticised him for recklessness, although spectators responded well to his tactics. Wisden also described his batting in the Gentlemen v Players match as "reckless", but he scored 94 for the Players at Lord's and 54 in 20 minutes at the Oval.

During the summer, both Australia and South Africa toured England, taking part in the Triangular Tournament. The competition was not a success owing to the poor weather and the inability of South Africa to compete with the other two teams. Also, several leading players were absent from the Australian team owing to the continuing dispute between them and the Australian Board of Control. In addition, spectators lost interest in the tournament because it took too long to complete. As a result, England's eventual victory lacked the prestige that had been expected before the season. Hobbs made a slow start to the competition when he was bowled in the first over in England's opening match against South Africa, and his batting form in all matches was uncertain in the early part of the season. However, he scored a century against Australia at Lord's on a very difficult batting pitch in England's next game, sharing a partnership of 112 with Rhodes. He continued with scores of 55 and 68 in the next two games against South Africa, and his batting was praised by the press; for the first time, in the Times, he was referred to as "a great master". South Africa were defeated in all three Tests played against England, and in two out of three (the third was drawn) by Australia. With the first two games between England and Australia drawn, the final match between these teams was designated as the deciding match for the tournament. Hobbs and Rhodes opened with 107, and Hobbs scored 66. These runs were crucial and England won the game by 244 runs. Hobbs also ran out Warren Bardsley in Australia's second innings, although there was controversy over the umpire's decision to rule him out.

Hobbs came top of the batting averages for the tournament, and in the final Test passed 2,000 runs in Test matches. In judging his performance in the season, Sydney Pardon, the editor of Wisden, wrote:

Hobbs was magnificent—just as good, allowing for the difference in the wickets, as he had been during his Australian and South African tours ...It was a great point in our batting that we had in Hobbs and Rhodes such a splendid pair to go in first. Thanks to constant association in South Africa and Australia the two men understood each other so well that they could with safety attempt short runs that in ordinary circumstances would have savoured of madness. They never seemed to let a chance escape them, and yet they seldom looked to be in any danger. Better running between the wickets has not often been seen.

— Sydney Pardon, Wisden, 1913

In Tests, Hobbs averaged 40.75 against South Africa and 56.00 against Australia. In all first-class cricket his aggregate was 2,042 runs at 37.81.

=== Years before the First World War ===
As there was no senior cricket tour in the winter of 1912–13, Hobbs took the opportunity to have a break. He took a job as a private cricket coach to a wealthy South African's son. He and his family also moved into their own property, Hobbs now being able to afford to buy, rather than rent a house. In 1913, Hobbs scored 2,605 runs at an average of 50.09, placing him second in the national averages to Phil Mead. Unlike the previous season, Hobbs was more controlled in his aggression. Even so, he continued to score quickly, twice scoring 100 runs before lunch on the first day of a match. He and Hayward also shared an opening partnership of 313 in 190 minutes against Worcestershire. One of his most high-profile achievements was an innings of 72 not out on a difficult pitch to guide the Players to victory over the Gentlemen at Lord's in a run-chase where time was short. Wisden described him as "the best bat" in England, and "one of the greatest bats of his generation"; it also paid tribute to both his consistency and ability to score runs in many different batting conditions and types of pitch.

In the winter of 1913–14, the MCC sent a team to South Africa under the captaincy of Johnny Douglas. The team was strong, but the South African side had few effective players and the previously dominant googly bowlers were either unavailable or had lost form. The tour encountered some difficulties; South Africa was experiencing industrial disputes which resulted in several strikes, and there were uncomfortable diplomatic incidents in Boer territory. Nor did the team get along with their manager, appointed by the South African Cricket Association. Hobbs also experienced some uncomfortable personal incidents. In Kimberley, he was the victim of attempted fraud by an impersonator, and at Amanzimtoti, he and two team-mates were involved in a road accident as a result of which Hobbs was thrown from their car. Neither Hobbs nor the other players were seriously hurt. On the field, England won the five-Test series 4–0, mainly as a result of the bowling of Sydney Barnes. Hobbs scored 443 runs at an average of 63.28 in the series; he did not score a century, but accumulated scores of 82, 92 and 97. With Rhodes, he shared two century opening partnerships and another of 92, although Hobbs did not open the batting in the second Test for tactical reasons. Critics pointed out that Hobbs was more defensive in his approach than he was for Surrey, and Wisden noted that he was "not quite so brilliant as in England" but said that he was "an absolute master on matting wickets [pitches]." In all first-class matches, he scored 1,489 runs at 74.45.

Shortly after the team returned home, the 1914 season began and Hobbs was praised in press previews of the season as the world's best batsman. Hobbs was awarded a benefit match by Surrey. He made a slow start to the season but innings of 100 and 74 on a difficult pitch in a close win over Yorkshire marked the beginning of a series of high scores. Against Essex, he hit the highest score of his career to that point when he scored 215 not out; the next highest score was 27. He scored 183 against Warwickshire, 163 against Hampshire, 156 for the Players against the Gentlemen and two other centuries before the end of July. At the same time, war in Europe was becoming more and more likely throughout the season. The day before Britain entered the First World War, against a background where it was uncertain if cricket would continue, Hobbs scored 226 against Nottinghamshire, surpassing his previous highest score despite suffering badly from a migraine. Cricket continued once the war began, but Hobbs' benefit was moved from the Oval to Lord's. This move, and the public's greater concern for the war, meant that the match was a failure; in total Hobbs' benefit raised £657 which was lower than most benefits and far less than raised for cricketers of Hobbs' standing. The Surrey committee attempted to increase the amount raised but eventually agreed to give him another benefit when the war concluded. Cricket continued for a little longer, and Hobbs scored his 11th century of the season before public pressure to cease caused Surrey to cancel their final fixtures. However, Surrey were declared County Champions for the only time in Hobbs' career. In all first-class games, he scored 2,697 runs at 58.63. McKinstry notes that during the season: "With his free-scoring method, [Hobbs] had dazzled in a way that he was never to do again."

== Bibliography ==
- Arlott, John (1981). Jack Hobbs: Profile of "The Master". London: John Murray/David-Poynter. ISBN 0-7195-3886-6.
- Birley, Derek (1999). A Social History of English Cricket. London: Aurum Press. ISBN 1-85410-941-3.
- Green, Benny, ed. (1982). Wisden Anthology 1900–1940. London: Queen Anne Press. ISBN 0-7472-0706-2.
- Mason, Ronald (1960). Jack Hobbs: A Portrait of an Artist as a Great Batsman. London: Hollis & Carter.
- McKinstry, Leo (2011). Jack Hobbs: England's Greatest Cricketer. London: Yellow Jersey Press. ISBN 978-0-224-08329-4.
