= 1905 English cricket season =

1905 was the 16th season of County Championship cricket in England. England defeated Australia 2–0 in the Test series and Yorkshire pipped defending champions Lancashire for the championship title.

== Honours ==
- County Championship - Yorkshire
- Minor Counties Championship - Norfolk
- Wisden - David Denton, Walter Lees, George Thompson, Joe Vine, Levi Wright

== County Championship ==
Yorkshire and Lancashire fought throughout the season; Lancashire were the first team to beat Yorkshire, in their ninth game, when hundreds from Reggie Spooner and Johnny Tyldesley helped Lancashire to an innings victory at Old Trafford. Lancashire went unbeaten until July, their fifteenth game, when Surrey overcame them at Aigburth, but Yorkshire were behind on the table with three losses before their match with Yorkshire at Bramall Lane. With Walter Brearley taking seven for 35 in the first innings, Lancashire took a lead of 101, but Wilfred Rhodes turned it around with 74 and four for 49. Lancashire could still have managed to take the title with wins in their final games, but a loss to Gloucestershire at Bristol while Yorkshire avoided defeat meant the title went to Yorkshire.

This season saw Northamptonshire join the Championship; they played twelve matches, beating Derbyshire and Hampshire to avoid the wooden spoon.

=== Final table ===
The final County Championship table is shown below. One point was awarded for a win, none for a draw, and minus one for a loss. Positions were decided on percentage of points over completed games.

County Championship 1905 - Final Standings
	Team	P	W	L	D	T	A	Pts	GC^{1}	Pts/GC (as %)
1	Yorkshire	28	13	3	7	0	0	15	21	71.43
2	Lancashire	26	12	3	10	0	1	9	15	60.00
3	Sussex	28	13	4	11	0	0	9	17	52.94
4	Surrey	28	14	6	6	1	1	8	20	40.00
5	Leicestershire	22	8	5	9	0	0	3	13	23.08
6	Kent	22	10	7	4	1	0	3	17	17.65
7	Warwickshire	22	5	4	13	0	1	1	9	11.11
=8	Gloucestershire	18	8	8	2	0	0	0	16	0.00
=8	Worcestershire	18	5	5	8	0	0	0	10	0.00
10	Nottinghamshire	20	6	7	7	0	0	-1	13	-7.69
11	Middlesex	18	4	7	7	0	0	-3	11	-27.27
12	Essex	20	3	10	7	0	0	-7	13	-53.85
13	Northamptonshire	12	2	8	2	0	0	-6	10	-60.00
14	Derbyshire	20	3	14	3	0	0	-11	17	-64.71
15	Somerset	18	1	10	7	0	0	-9	11	-81.82
16	Hampshire	20	1	12	7	0	0	-11	13	-84.62

- ^{1} Games completed

=== Most runs in the County Championship ===
1905 County Championship - leading batsmen
Name	Team	Matches	Runs	Average	100s	50s
David Denton	Yorkshire	28	1963	46.73	7	8
C. B. Fry	Sussex	15	1912	86.90	7	10
Willie Quaife	Warwickshire	22	1785	66.11	6	3
George Herbert Hirst	Yorkshire	24	1713	61.17	4	8
Levi Wright	Derbyshire	20	1651	43.44	4	10

=== Most wickets in the County Championship ===
1905 County Championship - leading bowlers
Name	Team	Matches	Balls bowled	Wickets taken	Average
Walter Lees	Surrey	27	7215	169	17.01
George Cox senior	Sussex	28	8277	154	21.40
George Dennett	Gloucestershire	17	5529	131	19.48
Colin Blythe	Kent	22	6087	130	19.94
Wilfred Rhodes	Yorkshire	25	5057	126	15.76

== Ashes tour ==
Australia toured England in 1905, playing 35 first class matches around the British Isles. They only lost three of them, beating both champions Yorkshire and runners-up Lancashire, but two of the lost matches were Tests, and they drew the other three to lose the series 0–2. England's captain, Stanley Jackson, not only won the series, but also won the toss in all five matches and headed both the batting and the bowling averages. Australia only took a first-innings lead in one of the matches, the first, and then Archie MacLaren responded with his highest career Test score of 140 before Bernard Bosanquet took eight for 107 and bowled England to a 213-run victory. The second Test only reached the third innings, with no play possible on the final day, while Australia survived 91 overs for the loss of seven wickets in the drawn third Test. In the fourth Test, however, they lost nine wickets for 51 on the final day, after being asked to follow on 249 behind. They lost by an innings and 80 runs, thus conceding an unassailable lead in the series before the final Test, where England made 430 and 261 for six declared to draw the game. The Australians' only other loss came at Leyton to Essex in June.

Cumulative record - Test wins	1876-1905
England	33
Australia	28
Drawn	15

== Overall first-class statistics ==
=== Leading batsmen ===
1905 English cricket season - leading batsmen (most runs)
Name	Team(s)	Matches	Runs	Average	100s	50s
C. B. Fry	England, Gentlemen, Gentlemen of England, MCC, Sussex	26	2801	70.02	10	12
Tom Hayward	England Players, South of England, Surrey	36	2592	44.68	5	18
David Denton	England, North of England, Players, Yorkshire	37	2405	42.19	8	10
George Herbert Hirst	England, North of England, Players, Yorkshire	35	2266	53.95	6	10
Willie Quaife	England, Players, Warwickshire	30	2060	54.21	6	3

=== Leading bowlers ===
1905 English cricket season - leading bowlers (most wickets)
Name	Team(s)	Matches	Balls bowled	Wickets taken	Average
Walter Lees	Players, South of England, Surrey	34	8331	193	18.01
Wilfred Rhodes	England, North of England, Players, Yorkshire	37	7449	182	16.95
Walter Brearley	England, Gentlemen, Gentlemen of England, Lancashire	25	6292	181	19.25
George Cox senior	MCC, South of England, Sussex	34	9348	170	21.87
George Dennett	Gloucestershire, MCC, Players	23	6969	163	20.98

== Annual reviews ==
- Wisden Cricketers' Almanack 1906
