= International cricket in 1907–08 =

International cricket season

The 1907–08 international cricket season was from September 1907 to April 1908. The season consists with a single international tour.

== Season overview ==
International tours
Start date	Home team	Away team	Results [Matches]			
Start date	Home team	Away team	Test	ODI	FC	LA
13 December 1907	Australia	England	4–1 [5]	—	—	—

== December ==
=== England in Australia ===
The Ashes Test series
No.	Date	Home captain	Away captain	Venue	Result
Test 96	13–18 December	Monty Noble	Frederick Fane	Sydney Cricket Ground, Sydney	Australia by 2 wickets
Test 97	1–7 January	Monty Noble	Frederick Fane	Melbourne Cricket Ground, Melbourne	England by 1 wickets
Test 98	10–16 January	Monty Noble	Frederick Fane	Adelaide Oval, Adelaide	Australia by 245 runs
Test 99	7–11 February	Monty Noble	Arthur Jones	Melbourne Cricket Ground, Melbourne	Australia by 308 runs
Test 100	21–27 February	Monty Noble	Arthur Jones	Sydney Cricket Ground, Sydney	Australia by 49 runs
