= Jimmy Sinclair (cricketer) =

South African cricketer

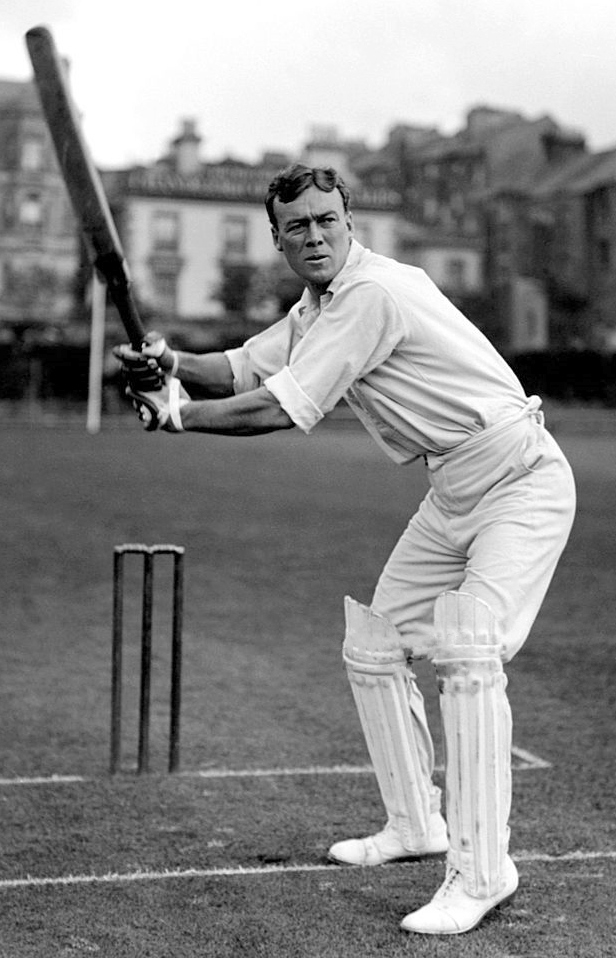

Personal information
- Full name: James Hugh Sinclair
- Born: 16 October 1876; Swellendam, Cape Colony
- Died: 23 February 1913 (aged 36); Yeoville, Transvaal Province, Union of South Africa
- Height: 6 ft 4 in (1.93 m)
- Batting: Right-handed
- Bowling: Right-arm fast-medium

International information
- National side: South Africa
- Test debut: 13 February 1896 v England
- Last Test: 3 March 1911 v Australia

Career statistics
Competition	Test	First-class
Matches	25	129
Runs scored	1,069	4,483
Batting average	23.23	21.55
100s/50s	3/3	6/21
Top score	106	136
Balls bowled	3,598	19,543
Wickets	63	491
Bowling average	31.68	21.43
5 wickets in innings	1	33
10 wickets in match	0	10
Best bowling	6/26	8/32
Catches/stumpings	9/–	66/–
- Source: Cricinfo, 17 June 2016

James Hugh Sinclair (16 October 1876 – 23 February 1913) was a South African cricketer who played in 25 Test matches from 1896 to 1911. He scored South Africa's first three Test centuries and was the first person from any country to score a century and take five wickets in an innings in the same Test. He is one of the fastest-scoring Test batsmen of all time.

== Cricket career ==
=== 1890s ===
Jimmy Sinclair stood six feet four inches tall and was a "prodigious right-handed hitter and an excellent fast bowler, combining a nice variety of pace with a high delivery". He made his first-class debut for Transvaal in the 1892–93 Currie Cup a few weeks after turning 16, opening both bowling and batting, taking eight wickets and scoring 37 and 11. He took 10 wickets and top-scored with 75 for a Johannesburg XV against Lord Hawke's XI in 1895–96 and was selected for all three Tests that followed.

At this stage in its history South Africa had played three Tests, all against England, and been so outclassed that no batsman had scored more than 29. That dismal record was not disturbed in the First Test in 1895–96, but in the Second Test Sinclair set a new record, scoring 40 in the first innings. He finished the series South Africa's second-highest scorer with 103 runs at an average of 17.16 and, opening the bowling, South Africa's second-highest wicket-taker with eight wickets at an average of 30.37. South Africa lost all three Tests by large margins.

In February 1897 Sinclair scored 301 not out in a club game, which remained the highest score in any form of cricket in South Africa for many years. South Africa's next Tests came in 1898–99, with a two-match series against England. This time, thanks largely to Sinclair, the matches were more evenly contested, and South Africa gained a first-innings lead each time before losing. He did not bowl in the First Test, but scored 86, South Africa's first Test fifty, opening the first innings; apart from Pelham Warner's 132 in England's second innings, no one else in the match reached 40. In the Second Test Sinclair became the first person from any country to score a century and take five wickets in an innings in the same Test. In England's first innings he took 6 for 30, dismissing them for 92, then went in to bat with South Africa's score at 27 for 2 to make 106 before being last out with the total on 177. He was caught on the boundary in each innings.

=== 1900s ===
Sinclair fought on the British side in the Boer War. In December 1899 it was recorded that he had joined Little's scouts and that he had expressed as fervent a desire to bowl over a few Boers as he did to knock out Lord Hawke's team in the final Test at Cape Town. He had a difficulty in that there was no patrol jacket big enough to fit him. He was captured by the Boers but escaped in time to take part in South Africa's tour of England in 1901.

No Tests were played on the 1901 tour. Sinclair's batting was only moderately successful, but in the first-class matches against the counties he twice took 13 wickets in a match, and as an indication of the esteem in which he was held in England he was invited to play a few games for London County and to represent the Gentlemen against the Players. For London County he took 8 for 32 against Derbyshire and scored 108 not out in 80 minutes against Warwickshire.

South Africa next played Test cricket when Australia brought a strong team for three Tests in 1902–03. The First Test was drawn, Sinclair making 44 and 19 and taking five wickets. It was the first Test South Africa had not lost. In the Second Test, a week later on the same ground, South Africa lost, but Sinclair top-scored in each innings: 101 in two hours out of a team total of 240 in the first innings, and 18 in the second out of 85. Sinclair made a duck in the first innings of the Third Test, but in the second innings he made one of the fastest Test centuries of all time: 104, including six sixes, in 80 minutes, off approximately 79 balls. Wisden described it as "a superb innings, and he might perhaps have made more runs if he had not become somewhat reckless after completing his hundred". He had gone to the wicket at 81 for 2, and the score was 216 for 6 when he was dismissed. South Africa lost again.

In South Africa's next Test series, against the English tourists in 1905–06, Sinclair made 160 runs at an average of 20.00 and took 21 wickets at 19.90 in South Africa's first series victory. By this stage other South Africans were also contributing substantially, such as the all-rounder Aubrey Faulkner and his fellow leg-spinners Reggie Schwarz, Bert Vogler and Gordon White, and the 4–1 series victory was a team effort. Sinclair continued to play Test cricket until 1911, but with only moderate success.

A 2006 source shows Sinclair as still being the world's sixth quickest Test batsman. He scored his runs at around 71 or 72 per 100 balls. Various stories are told about him, including that on one occasion a ball he had hit for six at the Old Wanderers Ground in Johannesburg landed on a train bound for the Cape and was only recovered at its destination. This ball was for many years on display at the Wanderers' clubhouse (both old and new grounds) until a fire in the latter part of the 20th century.

== Other sports ==
Sinclair also played international rugby union and won a single international appearance in association football, thus representing his country at three sports. He shares this distinction with his contemporary Percy Sherwell (cricket, association football and tennis).

== Personal life and death ==
Sinclair worked in banking before setting up as a "mining material and general broker". He married "a Miss Ryan" in about 1904.

After a long illness, Sinclair died in Johannesburg in February 1913 aged 36, leaving a widow and two sons. A memorial fund was set up, 10 per cent of which was to go towards a suitable tombstone, and the other 90 per cent to be placed in trust for the education of Sinclair's sons.

== Racism controversy ==
In Rowland Bowen's extensive history of cricket, Cricket: A History of its Growth and Development throughout the World (1970), he deplored Sinclair's treatment of the non-white South African Test player Charlie Llewellyn during the tour of Australia in 1910–11: "[Llewellyn] was tormented by his white fellow tourists to such an extent that for peace and quiet in the hotels where the team stayed, he had to take refuge in the W.Cs and lock himself in. His chief tormentor was J. H. Sinclair, the leading Transvaal batsman. This kind of thing should never be forgotten when South African cricket is referred to." Bowen provided no source or evidence for this assertion, but it has coloured Sinclair's reputation since.

The South African writers Jonty Winch and Richard Parry investigated the relations between Sinclair and Llewellyn in the light of Bowen's assertion and published their findings in 2009. They found no evidence that Sinclair had ever behaved reprehensibly towards Llewellyn. In fact they noted that Sinclair "had admired and loyally backed Llewellyn over a period of fifteen years". Sinclair, who was on the committee that organised the tour to Australia, had supported both Llewellyn's inclusion in the team and a special payment for him in recognition of Llewellyn's life as a professional cricketer.

The South African Test batsman Herbie Taylor, who was not on the tour, later said he had heard that some of the South African players on the tour gave Llewellyn "a hard time now and again" when they had been drinking. He did not name them or say that the behaviour had a racial motivation. As Llewellyn was being paid more than the other players and had shown patchy form on the tour, Winch and Parry suggest that the antagonism may have been motivated by resentment. In the 1970s, Llewellyn's daughter, who had not even been aware that her father had mixed-race parentage until Bowen's book revealed the fact, said her father's relations with his former teammates from South Africa were all friendly.

Winch and Parry concluded that while "it cannot be assumed that Bowen was simply making it up", he may have misinterpreted or exaggerated his information and used it to belabour the South African apartheid regime and the English cricket establishment, both of which he detested. It is "therefore reasonable to say he was wrong given Sinclair's long and positive relationship with Llewellyn".

== Cited sources ==
- Ali Bacher and David Williams (2013) Jacques Kallis and 12 Other Great South African All-Rounders. Penguin, Johannesburg. ISBN 9780143538325.
