= International cricket in 1922–23 =

International cricket season

The 1922–23 international cricket season was from September 1922 to April 1923.

== Season overview ==
International tours
Start date	Home team	Away team	Results [Matches]			
Start date	Home team	Away team	Test	ODI	FC	LA
3 November 1922	Australia	Marylebone	—	—	3–0 [8]	—
23 December 1922	South Africa	England	1–2 [5]	—	—	—
30 December 1922	New Zealand	Marylebone	—	—	0–2 [3]	—

== November ==
=== MCC in Australia ===
First-class match
No.	Date	Home captain	Away captain	Venue	Result
Match 1	3–4 November	(Western Australia) Leonidas Bott	Jock Hartley	WACA Ground, Perth	Match drawn
Match 2	10–13 November	(South Australia) Charlie Dolling	Archie MacLaren	Adelaide Oval, Adelaide	South Australia by 6 wickets
Match 3	17–20 November	(Victoria (state)) Edgar Mayne	Archie MacLaren	Melbourne Cricket Ground, Melbourne	Victoria by 2 wickets
Match 4	24–27 November	(New South Wales) Herbie Collins	Archie MacLaren	Sydney Cricket Ground, Sydney	New South Wales by 5 wickets
Match 5	2–% March	(New South Wales) Herbie Collins	Jock Hartley	Sydney Cricket Ground, Sydney	Match drawn
Match 6	7–8 March	Not mentioned	Jock Hartley	Melbourne Cricket Ground, Melbourne	Match drawn
Match 7	9–12 March	(Victoria (state)) Jack Ryder	Jock Hartley	Melbourne Cricket Ground, Melbourne	Match drawn
Match 8	15–17 March	(South Australia) Charlie Dolling	Jock Hartley	Adelaide Oval, Adelaide	Match drawn

== December ==
=== England in South Africa ===
Test series
No.	Date	Home captain	Away captain	Venue	Result
Test 148	23–28 December	Herbie Taylor	Frank Mann	Old Wanderers, Johannesburg	South Africa by 168 runs
Test 149	1–4 January	Herbie Taylor	Frank Mann	Newlands, Cape Town	England by 1 wicket
Test 150	18–22 January	Herbie Taylor	Frank Mann	Kingsmead, Durban	Match drawn
Test 151	9–13 February	Herbie Taylor	Frank Mann	Old Wanderers, Johannesburg	Match drawn
Test 152	16–22 February	Herbie Taylor	Frank Mann	Kingsmead, Durban	England by 109 runs

=== MCC in New Zealand ===
First-class Series
No.	Date	Home captain	Away captain	Venue	Result
Match 1	30 Dec–2 January	Not mentioned	Archie MacLaren	Basin Reserve, Wellington	Marylebone by an innings and 156 runs
Match 2	5–8 January	Not mentioned	Not mentioned	AMI Stadium, Christchurch	Match drawn
Match 3	2–5 February	Not mentioned	Not mentioned	Basin Reserve, Wellington	Marylebone by an innings and 20 runs
