= International cricket in 1905–06 =

International cricket season

The 1905–06 international cricket season was from September 1905 to April 1906. The season consisted of a single international tour, with England visiting South Africa.

== Season overview ==
International tours
Start date	Home team	Away team	Results [Matches]			
Start date	Home team	Away team	Test	ODI	FC	LA
2 January 1906	South Africa	England	4–1 [5]	—	—	—

== January ==
=== England in South Africa ===
Test series
No.	Date	Home captain	Away captain	Venue	Result
Test 88	1–5 January	Percy Sherwell	Pelham Warner	Old Wanderers, Johannesburg	South Africa by 1 wickets
Test 89	1–5 January	Percy Sherwell	Pelham Warner	Old Wanderers, Johannesburg	South Africa by 9 wickets
Test 90	26 Feb–3 March	Percy Sherwell	Pelham Warner	Old Wanderers, Johannesburg	South Africa by 243 runs
Test 91	7–9 March	Percy Sherwell	Pelham Warner	Newlands Cricket Ground, Cape Town	England by 4 wickets
Test 92	11–14 March	Percy Sherwell	Pelham Warner	Newlands Cricket Ground, Cape Town	South Africa by an innings and 16 runs
