= 1905 County Championship =

British cricket tournament

- Cricket format: First-class cricket (3 days)
- Tournament format: League system
- Champions: Yorkshire (7th title)
- Participants: 16
- Most runs: David Denton (1,963 for Yorkshire)
- Most wickets: Walter Lees (169 for Surrey)

Location of the home ground of each county

The 1905 County Championship was the 16th officially organised running of the County Championship, and ran from 4 May to 4 September 1905. Yorkshire won their seventh championship title, while the previous season's winners, Lancashire, finished in fourth place. The number of participants was expanded from fifteen to sixteen, with Northamptonshire gaining first-class status, having previously played with some success in the Minor Counties Championship.

== Table ==
- One point was awarded for a win, and one point was taken away for each loss. Final placings were decided by dividing the number of points earned by the number of completed matches (i.e. those that ended in a win or a loss), and multiplying by 100.
- The tied match did not count as a finished match for working out the percentage.

Team	Pld	W	T	L	D	A	Pts	Fin	%Fin
Yorkshire	28	18	0	3	7	0	15	21	71.42
Lancashire	26	12	0	3	10	1	9	15	60.00
Sussex	28	13	0	4	11	0	9	17	52.94
Surrey	28	14	1	6	6	1	8	20	40.00
Leicestershire	22	8	0	5	9	0	3	13	23.07
Kent	22	10	1	7	4	0	3	17	17.64
Warwickshire	22	5	0	4	13	0	1	9	11.11
Gloucestershire	18	8	0	8	2	0	0	16	0.00
Worcestershire	18	5	0	5	8	0	0	10	0.00
Nottinghamshire	20	6	0	7	7	0	–1	13	–7.69
Middlesex	18	4	0	7	7	0	–3	11	–27.27
Essex	20	3	0	10	7	0	–7	13	–53.84
Northamptonshire	12	2	0	8	2	0	–6	10	–60.00
Derbyshire	20	3	0	14	3	0	–11	17	–64.70
Somerset	18	1	0	10	7	0	–9	11	–81.81
Hampshire	20	1	0	12	7	0	–11	13	–84.61

== Records ==
=== Batting ===
Most runs
Aggregate	Average	Player	County
1,963	46.73	David Denton	Yorkshire
1,912	86.90	C. B. Fry	Sussex
1,785	66.11	Willie Quaife	Warwickshire
1,713	61.17	George Hirst	Yorkshire
1,651	43.44	Levi Wright	Derbyshire

=== Bowling ===
Most wickets
Aggregate	Average	Player	County
169	17.01	Walter Lees	Surrey
154	21.40	George Cox	Sussex
131	19.48	George Dennett	Gloucestershire
130	19.94	Charlie Blythe	Kent
126	18.71	Wilfred Rhodes	Yorkshire
