= Billy Moon =

English footballer, cricketer, and solicitor

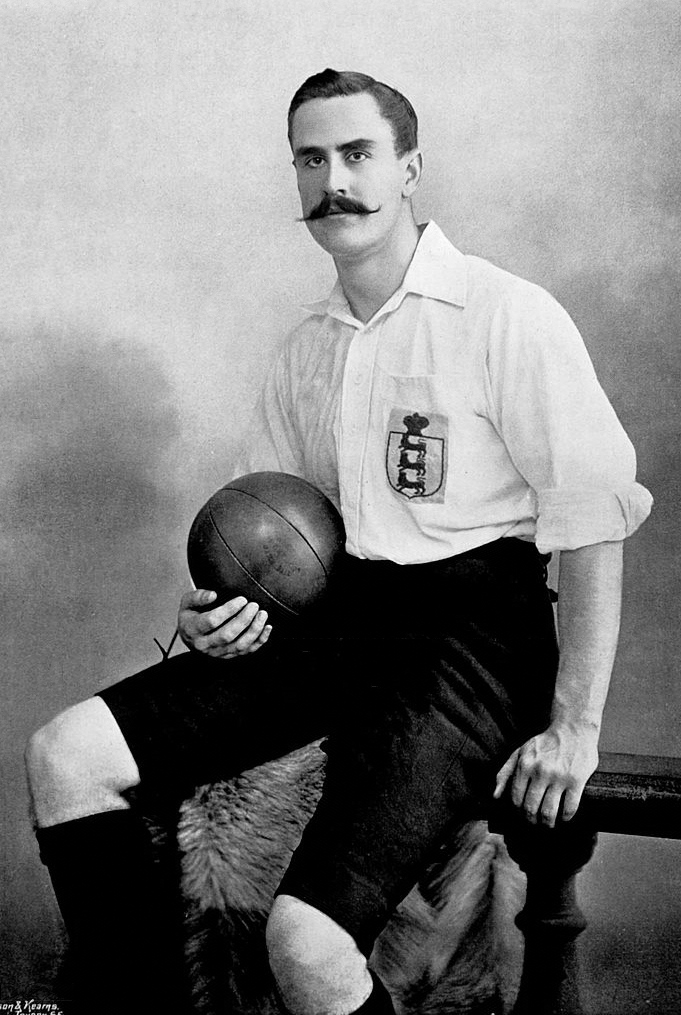

Personal information
- Full name: William Robert Moon
- Date of birth: 7 June 1868
- Place of birth: Maida Vale, London, England
- Date of death: 9 January 1943 (aged 74)
- Place of death: Hendon, Middlesex, England
- Position: Goalkeeper

Senior career*
Years	Team	Apps	(Gls)
- Old Westminsters

International career
1888–1891	England	7	(0)
- * Club domestic league appearances and goals

William Robert Moon (7 June 1868 – 9 January 1943) was an English association football goalkeeper and a member of the England national football team. He also played first-class cricket with Middlesex. His brother Leonard Moon was a Test cricketer.

Moon debuted for England in a win over Wales in 1888 and same year kept a clean sheet against Scotland. His record as being the youngest goalkeeper for England remained until August 2012 when this was taken by Jack Butland of Birmingham City who was 64 days his junior. Up until 1891 he appeared in three further internationals against Wales and was capped twice against Scotland. He captained his country for the last of his seven internationals, when England took on Scotland at Ewood Park. When not playing for England he occupied the goals for both Old Westminsters and the Corinthians.

A solicitor by profession, Moon was also a capable cricketer and played as a hard hitting wicket-keeper batsman. He kept wicket for Middlesex in two first-class cricket matches during the 1891 County Championship. He made 17 not out on debut against Surrey in what would be his only first-class innings as Moon's second match was washed out after a day.
