= William Shalders =

South African cricketer

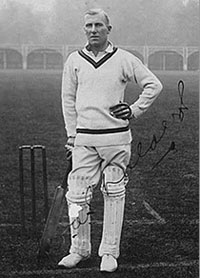

Personal information
- Full name: William Alfred Shalders
- Born: 12 February 1880; Kimberley, Cape Colony
- Died: 19 March 1917 (aged 37); Cradock, Cape Province, South Africa
- Batting: Right-handed
- Bowling: Right-arm medium-pace

International information
- National side: South Africa

Domestic team information
- Years: Team
- 1897–98 to 1898–99: Griqualand West
- 1902–03 to 1906–07: Transvaal

Career statistics
| Competition | Tests | First-class |
|---|---|---|
| Matches | 12 | 88 |
| Runs scored | 355 | 3351 |
| Batting average | 16.13 | 23.27 |
| 100s/50s | 0/0 | 2/14 |
| Top score | 42 | 105 |
| Balls bowled | 48 | 331 |
| Wickets | 1 | 6 |
| Bowling average | 6.00 | 23.16 |
| 5 wickets in innings | 0 | 0 |
| 10 wickets in match | 0 | 0 |
| Best bowling | 1/6 | 3/30 |
| Catches/stumpings | 3/– | 38/– |
- Source: Cricinfo, 13 July 2017

William Alfred Shalders, also known as William Alfred Shalders Heap (12 February 1880 – 19 March 1917) was a Cape Colony cricketer who played in 12 Test matches for South Africa from 1899 to 1907.

== Early life ==
Shalders was born in Kimberley, where his parents, John and Emily Shalders, owned the Halfway House inn from 1884 to 1925. He attended Kimberley Boys' High School.

== Cricket career ==
Shalders was a stroke-playing opening batsman whose impetuosity often led to his dismissal in the twenties or thirties. His highest Test score was 42 in his second Test, when South Africa took a first-innings lead of 65 over Australia only to lose by 159 runs. He made a valuable 38 when South Africa beat England by one wicket in the 1905–06 series.

Shalders toured England with the South African teams in 1901, 1904 and 1907, playing 58 of his 88 first-class matches in England and scoring his two first-class centuries. In 1901 he was the South Africans' second-highest run-scorer, with 782 runs at an average of 30.07, with a top score of 103 against Somerset. In 1907 he scored 105 against Hampshire. His highest first-class score in South Africa was 93, the highest score of the match, in an innings victory for Transvaal over Natal in the 1903–04 Currie Cup.

He was also a fine fieldsman and useful bowler.

== Life outside cricket ==
Shalders was a member of the Kimberley Town Guard during the Siege of Kimberley (October 1899 to February 1900) and was awarded the Queen's South Africa Medal and the Kimberley Star. He also served in World War I.

Shalders married Myrah Richmond in Johannesburg in September 1909. They had a farm at Bath Heights, near Cradock in Cape Province. They had one child who died at one day old in February 1914. Shalders died on 19 March 1917 at Cradock, aged 37, and is buried in the Cradock cemetery.

Shalders often used the surname Heap. His father's family name was Heap, and his mother's later remarried name was Shalders. On his marriage certificate he is "William Alfred Shalders Heap". On his official death notice he is "William Alfred Heap, also known as William Alfred Shalders and William Alfred Shalders Heap". On his grave he is "William Alfred Shalders".
