= George Thompson (cricketer) =

English cricketer (1877–1943)

Personal information
- Born: 27 October 1877; Northampton
- Died: 3 March 1943 (aged 65); Bristol
- Batting: Right-handed
- Bowling: Right-arm fast-medium

International information
- National side: England
- Test debut (cap 159): 27 May 1909 v Australia
- Last Test: 14 March 1910 v South Africa

Career statistics
Competition	Test	First-class
Matches	6	352
Runs scored	273	12,018
Batting average	30.33	22.01
100s/50s	0/2	9/53
Top score	63	131*
Balls bowled	1,367	63,988
Wickets	23	1,591
Bowling average	27.73	18.89
5 wickets in innings	0	147
10 wickets in match	0	40
Best bowling	4/50	9/63
Catches/stumpings	5/–	252/–
- Source: CricInfo, 30 December 2021

George Joseph Thompson (27 October 1877 – 3 March 1943) was the mainstay of the Northamptonshire county cricket eleven for a long period encompassing both its days as a minor county and its earliest years in the County Championship.

Standing well over six feet tall and weighing more than 16 stone or 102 kilograms, Thompson was an all-rounder. Despite his large frame, his batting relied chiefly on a watchful eye that made him difficult to dismiss when pitches were hard. Though at times he would hit hard, he had little backlift and could play only a restricted range of strokes, and his size made him rather slow of foot and hence seldom likely to make many runs on the numerous rain-affected pitches of his day. As a bowler, he was above medium pace and could gain a great deal of spin, which made him respected when pitches were hard and frequently unplayable after rain or on a crumbling pitch. His large hands and long reach made him an excellent fieldsman at slip: in 1914 as an out-fielder took three catches off consecutive balls against Warwickshire. (Note: This feat was not to be emulated by any other out-fielder until Marcus Trescothick in 2018: four wicket-keepers have also achieved a hat-trick of catches, but none of these predated Thompson's achievement)

== Early career ==
George Thompson was born in Northampton's Louise Road, and sent to Wellingborough School shortly after his mother died. After leaving Wellingborough, he played in Northamptonshire club cricket for Cogenhoe and, from 1896, Excelsior. For both of these clubs Thompson was already a major force even as a teenager.

== Minor Counties and MCC ==
George Thompson first played for Northamptonshire in 1895 as an amateur when only seventeen, but would turn professional in 1897. Thompson's ability was demonstrated so quickly, that he made his first-class debut for the Marylebone Cricket Club against Essex as early as 1897, when he was not yet twenty. Thompson did nothing in his only appearance that season, and played only twice for M.C.C. in 1898 and no games whatsoever in 1899. Nevertheless, from 1898 he formed a deadly partnership with bat and ball alongside William East for Northamptonshire in the new Minor Counties Championship, where the county was unbeaten for three years beginning in July 1898.

In 1900, Thompson plated five first-class games for M.C.C. with modest success, but surprised the critics with an excellent innings of 125 for the Players at the Scarborough Festival in September, where he played only because of the unavailability of John Gunn and Mead. In the following four seasons Thompson was amazingly successful for Northamptonshire in the Minor Counties Championship, and was so well regarded that he went as chief bowler on a tour to New Zealand (Note: New Zealand would not attain Test status until 1930.) led by Lord Hawke. On this tour, Thompson did consistently excellent work, taking fifty-seven wickets for 11.35 each in eleven-a-side matches and another 120 for 490 runs in matches against odds. (Note: Before World War I, touring teams would often play against opponents with more than eleven players to partially compensate for the low strength of local teams.) In a match against a full-strength South Australian team at Unley Oval, Thompson took nine for 85 in the first innings and 12 for 198 in the match, although the locals would win after following on on a "good" pitch.

In 1904, Thompson averaged 42 with the bat and less than 11 with the ball, showing he was clearly too good for "second-class" level.

== Early Career in First-Class County Cricket ==
When Northamptonshire became first-class in 1905, Thompson, though his team-mates showed themselves unable to compete at a higher level than Minor Counties cricket, bowled superbly even if he was aided by playing mostly during the wettest weather of the summer. The reward was a deserved Cricketer of the Year selection, and a benefit in the final home county match against Warwickshire that netted Thompson £409 10s. He was invited to tour South Africa, but the Northamptonshire committee refused to let Thompson go for fear it would affect his work for the county in subsequent summers.

Though overworked in the absence of support bowlers, Thompson bowled excellently in 1906 and did the "double" of 1000 runs and 100 wickets in all first-class matches. He would take 24 wickets in three consecutive innings against Derbyshire and Leicestershire during June, a feat only equalled ten times in first-class cricket. (Note: Charlie Parker in 1925 took 26 wickets in three innings, whilst Tich Freeman in 1932 and George Giffen in 1886 took 25 in three successive innings.)

In 1907, despite the presence of Lancelot Driffield as a second support bowler alongside East, Thompson maintained his excellence with the ball and did the hat-trick against Lancashire at Old Trafford. However, Thompson declined so badly with the bat that he did not once score 40 in a first-class innings and averaged only 13.90 for 556 runs over 43 visits to the wicket. Then in 1908 he returned to form with the bat but his bowling declined so much that his average for all first-class matches rose to over 28 for just 84 wickets.

== Northamptonshire's Rise to Prominence ==
Thompson rebounded so well in 1909 that he had his best season on record, taking 163 wickets and playing for England at Edgbaston, where his bowling was not required because Hirst and Blythe were so deadly. In the following winter his watchful eye on the matting wickets allowed Thompson to play the South African "googly" bowlers with more assurance than anybody except Jack Hobbs and in 1910 he again did the "double". On the rock-hard wickets of 1911, Thompson bowled as well as ever – so well that he headed the first-class averages, whilst his bowling and slip catching was a major factor in Northamptonshire rising to one of the top counties in 1912 and 1913.

Whilst he showed some decline as a bowler in 1914, Thompson batted better than ever, and it was a great pity for Northamptonshire that serious injuries prevented him playing at all until 1921, when he had lost his bowling completely but retained some of his batting skill. After a few games in 1922, Thompson's career ended tamely.
