= Leonard Moon =

English cricketer (1878–1916)

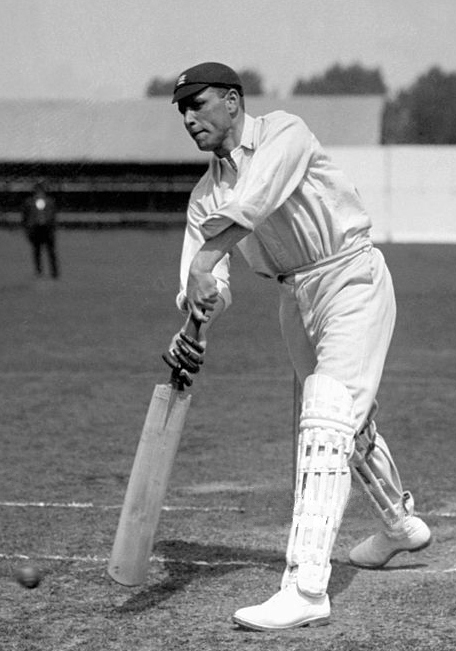

Personal information
- Full name: Leonard James Moon
- Born: 8 February 1878; Kensington, London
- Died: 23 November 1916 (aged 38); Salonika, Greece
- Batting: Right-handed
- Role: Batsman
- Relatives: Billy Moon (brother)

International information
- National side: England
- Test debut (cap 150): 6 March 1906 v South Africa
- Last Test: 2 April 1906 v South Africa

Domestic team information
- Years: Team
- 1897–1900: Cambridge University
- 1899–1909: Middlesex

Career statistics
Competition	Test	First-class
Matches	4	96
Runs scored	182	4,166
Batting average	22.75	26.87
100s/50s	0/0	7/18
Top score	36	162
Catches/stumpings	4/–	72/13
- Source: CricketArchive, 29 November 2009

2nd Lieutenant Leonard James Moon (9 February 1878 – 23 November 1916) was an officer in the British Army who died of wounds suffered in World War I. Before the war, he was an amateur first-class cricketer who played for Middlesex County Cricket Club from 1899 to 1909, and in four Test matches for England in 1905–06. He was born in London and died near Salonika. Moon also played football for Corinthians & Fulham and his brother Billy was an England international goalkeeper.

Moon was a right-handed top-order batsman and an occasional wicket-keeper. He played in 96 first-class matches. He scored 4,166 career runs at an average of 26.87 runs per completed innings with a highest score of 162 as one of seven centuries. As a fielder and keeper, he held 72 catches and completed 13 stumpings.

== Career ==
Leonard Moon was born at 45, Portsdown Road, London (his parents' home) on 9 February 1878. He was the son of William Moon, a Lincoln's Inn Fields solicitor. Moon was educated at Westminster School where he was a member of the school cricket XI for three seasons from 1894 to 1896. In his final year, he averaged 46.69 as a batsman and scored 57 against Charterhouse. He progressed to the University of Cambridge where he was admitted to Pembroke College in October 1896. He played cricket and football there and was awarded blues for both sports: in 1889 and 1890 for cricket; in 1888, 1889 and 1890 for football. When he left Cambridge, Moon became a teacher at Wellesley House School in Broadstairs.

Moon became a member of Marylebone Cricket Club in 1898 and made his debut for Middlesex County Cricket Club in 1899. He toured North America with MCC in the autumn of 1905 and South Africa in 1905–06, where he played for England in four Tests.

== First World War ==
Moon enlisted in the British Army during World War I and became a 2nd lieutenant with the Devon Regiment. He died of wounds suffered while fighting near Salonica in Greece. He is buried in Karasouli Military Cemetery (grave A189).
