= Frank Smith (umpire) =

English cricketer and umpire

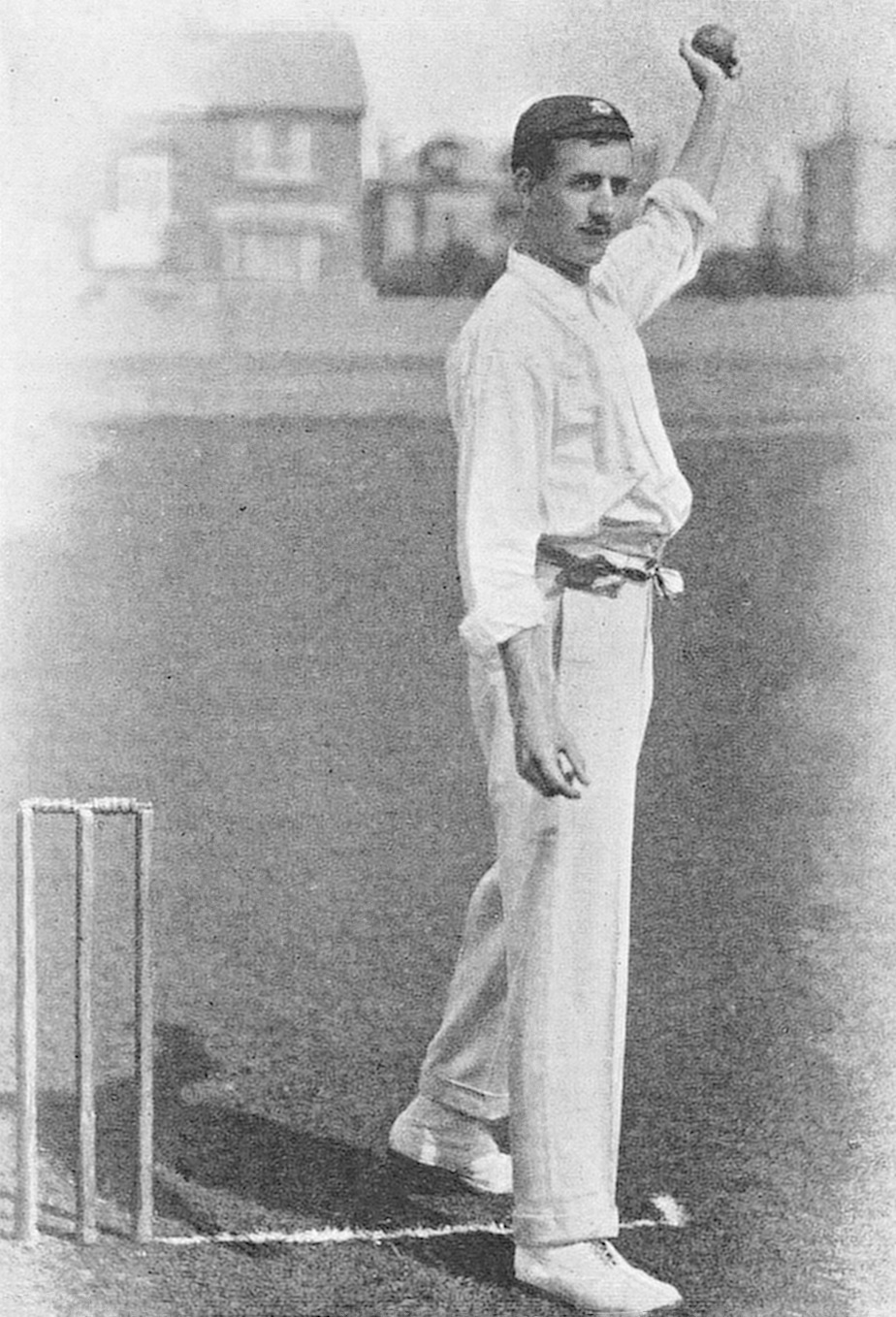
- Frank Smith

Personal information
- Full name: Frank Ernest Smith
- Born: 13 May 1872; Bury St Edmunds, Suffolk
- Died: 3 December 1943 (aged 71); Sedbergh, Yorkshire
- Batting: Left-handed
- Bowling: Left-arm orthodox spin

Domestic team information
- Years: Team
- 1893–1908: Surrey
- 1901–1902: London County
- 1906–1907: Transvaal

Umpiring information
- Tests umpired: 5 (1902–1910)

Career statistics
Competition	First-class
Matches	68
Runs scored	578
Batting average	9.79
100s/50s	0/0
Top score	45
Balls bowled	10,358
Wickets	194
Bowling average	20.36
5 wickets in innings	9
10 wickets in match	3
Best bowling	6/12
Catches/stumpings	31/–
- Source: CricInfo, 21 September 2008

Frank Ernest Smith (13 May 1872 – 3 December 1943) was an English professional cricketer who played first-class cricket between 1893 and 1908. He played 68 games and later umpired.

He was born at Bury St Edmunds in Suffolk.

As a player, Smith played for Surrey County Cricket Club as part of the County Championship-winning sides of 1893 and 1895 and was awarded his county cap in 1894. His best season was in 1894 when he took 95 wickets with his "rather slow" left-handed deliveries. He made 11 appearances for the short-lived London County between 1901 and 1902 and played once for Transvaal in 1907, spending many years coaching in South Africa during the English off-season. As an umpire, he stood in five Test matches between 1902 and 1910, all in South Africa.

After playing Smith coached at Sedbergh School in Yorkshire. He died at Sedbergh in 1943 aged 71.

== See also ==
- List of Test umpires
