= Ernie Hayes =

English cricketer

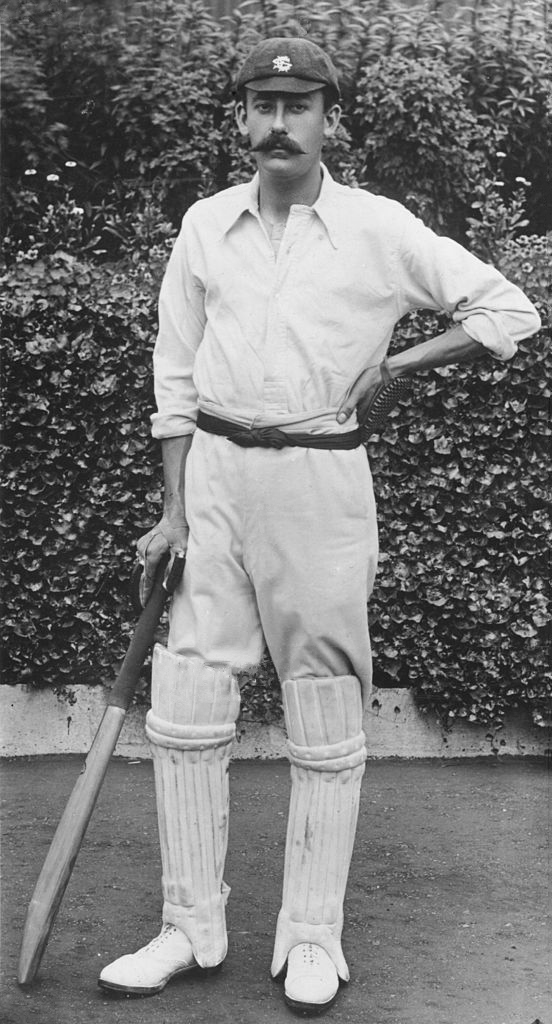
- Hayes in 1912

Personal information
- Born: 6 November 1876; Peckham, London
- Died: 2 December 1953 (aged 77); West Dulwich, London
- Batting: Right-handed
- Bowling: Legbreak

International information
- National side: England
- Test debut: 2 January 1906 v South Africa
- Last Test: 12 August 1912 v South Africa

Career statistics
Competition	Test	First-class
Matches	5	560
Runs scored	86	27,318
Batting average	10.75	32.21
100s/50s	0/0	48/142
Top score	35	276
Balls bowled	90	27,022
Wickets	1	515
Bowling average	52.00	26.70
5 wickets in innings	0	12
10 wickets in match	0	2
Best bowling	1/28	8/22
Catches/stumpings	2/–	608/2
- Source: CricInfo, 6 November 2022

Ernest George Hayes MBE (6 November 1876 – 2 December 1953) was an English first-class cricketer who played for Surrey, Leicestershire and England.

Ernie Hayes was a right-handed batsman, usually batting at No 3 and strong at driving and pulling, a leg-break bowler and a fine slip fielder. He was a regular in the Surrey side for 15 years up to the First World War, scoring 1,000 runs and more in every season from 1899 to 1914. His best year was 1906 when he scored 2,309 runs at an average of more than 45 runs an innings, and he was named as a Wisden Cricketer of the Year in 1907. His highest score, 276, was made against Hampshire in 1909 at The Oval, when he shared a second wicket partnership of 371 with Jack Hobbs that remains a Surrey record.

Hayes' bowling was intermittently useful: in 1905, he took 76 wickets, and in 1912 there were 60, but in other seasons he took very few and was expensive. As a slip fielder, he took more than 600 catches in all matches.

Hayes' Test match career was not a success. He went to South African under Pelham Warner in 1905–06 and played in three of the Tests in the first series ever won against England by the South African cricket team. He scored just 69 runs, with a top score of 35. He also went on the 1907–08 tour to Australia, but his form was so poor that he was not picked for any of the Tests. In 1909, he played once in a home Test against the Australians, but though the match was won, he scored only 13 runs in his two innings. Finally, he was recalled for one match against South Africa in the 1912 Triangular Tournament, and scored just four runs.

After distinguished war service that won him the MBE, Hayes returned to Surrey as an amateur in 1919, but retired after just one season. He was afflicted with a contracture of the fingers of the right hand that made holding a bat difficult: this was attributed to years of fielding at slip to the stinging pace of Tom Richardson and William Lockwood. He moved to Leicestershire as coach and Second Eleven captain, and was so successful that, in 1926, at the age of 49, he was picked for five first-team matches, scoring 99 against Nottinghamshire in his first game and heading the county's averages.

In all cricket, he scored 27,318 runs with 48 centuries, and took 515 wickets.

He was later coach at Surrey. In 1933 he retired to run a pub, the Paxton Arms in West Norwood, being its landlord for 20 years.
