= Percy Sherwell =

South African cricketer (1880 – 1948)

- Percy Sherwell in 1911

Personal information
- Born: 17 August 1880; Isipingo, Natal
- Died: 17 April 1948 (aged 67); Bulawayo, Rhodesia
- Batting: Right-handed
- Role: Wicketkeeper-batsman

International information
- National side: South Africa

Career statistics
Competition	Tests	First-class
Matches	13	58
Runs scored	427	1808
Batting average	23.72	24.10
100s/50s	1/1	3/6
Top score	115	144
Balls bowled	0	0
Wickets	–	–
Bowling average	–	–
5 wickets in innings	–	–
10 wickets in match	–	–
Best bowling	–	–
Catches/stumpings	20/16	67/53
- Source: Cricinfo

Percy William Sherwell (17 August 1880 – 17 April 1948) was a South African cricketer who played in 13 Tests for South Africa as captain, wicketkeeper and batsman from 1906 to 1911.

== Life and career ==
Sherwell was the eldest of ten brothers. His father, Thomas, was described as a "Rand pioneer" and Percy was brought up and educated to follow in his father's footsteps as a mining man. To this end, he was first sent to school at the Berea Academy in Natal, followed by St. Michael's College in Johannesburg, before rounding off his education in England at Bedford County School from the age of 15, followed by a spell at the Camborne School of Mines in Cornwall. He returned to the Rand in 1902 to take up a managerial position in a gold mine.

It was while at Bedford, he said, that his cricket developed. He became captain of the school as well as playing rugby. During his time at Camborne, he represented Cornwall at both cricket and rugby and took the opportunity of the long summer holiday to attend big matches at Lord's and The Oval to pick up tips on technique from the best players.

He captained South Africa in every one of his 13 Tests. Keeping wicket to the South African leg-spin quartet of Faulkner, Schwarz, Vogler and White, he stumped a higher proportion of his victims than any other wicketkeeper with over 20 dismissals. In his first Test match, he led South Africa to their first victory in Tests when they beat England by one wicket in Johannesburg in January 1906, scoring 22 not out in a match-winning last-wicket partnership of 48 with Dave Nourse. He recorded his only Test century at Lord's in 1907. E. W. Swanton called this golden age of South African cricket the "Sherwell era".

He holds the record for playing the most number of test matches for whom he has kept wicket and opened the batting as a captain (did it in 7 test matches) From 1907 to 1924 he was a Test selector.

Sherwell was also an accomplished tennis player, winning the singles title at the South African Championships in 1904 and the doubles title in 1903 and 1904 and representing South Africa against England in 1909–10. He also played rugby union for Cornwall and was an international-class hockey player.
