= Jock Hartley =

English cricketer and British Army officer

Personal information
- Full name: John Cabourn Hartley
- Born: 15 November 1874; Lincoln, Lincolnshire, England
- Died: 8 March 1963 (aged 88); Woodhall Spa, Lincolnshire, England
- Batting: Right-handed
- Bowling: Leg-break

International information
- National side: England
- Test debut: 10 March 1906 v South Africa
- Last Test: 2 April 1906 v South Africa

Career statistics
Competition	Test	First-class
Matches	2	84
Runs scored	15	1,380
Batting average	3.75	12.89
100s/50s	0/0	0/2
Top score	9	84*
Balls bowled	192	10,489
Wickets	1	227
Bowling average	115.00	25.40
5 wickets in innings	0	12
10 wickets in match	0	4
Best bowling	1/62	8/161
Catches/stumpings	2/0	53/0
- Source: CricketArchive, 1 July 2017

Colonel John Cabourn Hartley DSO (15 November 1874 – 8 March 1963), known as Jock Hartley, was an English first-class cricketer and British Army officer.

== Cricket career ==
Hartley was educated at Tonbridge School and Brasenose College, Oxford. He played first-class cricket for Oxford University from 1895 to 1897 and Sussex from 1895 to 1898. He then went on to play for Marylebone Cricket Club (MCC) in first-class fixtures until the 1926 season. He was vice-captain of the MCC team in New Zealand in 1922-23, but captained most of the matches owing to an injury to the captain, Archie MacLaren.

Hartley played two Test matches for England on their tour to South Africa in 1905-06, but with little success.

His best first-class bowling figures were 8 for 161 for Oxford University in the first innings in Oxford's victory over Cambridge University in 1896. He also took 3 for 78 in the second innings and top-scored with 43 in Oxford's first innings. He made his highest score of 84 not out at the age of 50 when he captained MCC in a match against Wales in 1925.

== Military career ==
Hartley was commissioned into the Army as a second lieutenant in the Royal Fusiliers on 13 July 1898, and was promoted to lieutenant on 2 August 1899. He served with the 2nd battalion of his regiment in South Africa during the Second Boer War, where he was present at the Battle of Colenso (December 1899), engagements at Pieter's Hill, Hussar Hill and Hlangwani (February 1900), and the subsequent relief of Ladysmith in late February 1900. In the following months he served in the Transvaal, including the engagement at Rooidam (May 1900). After the end of the war in South Africa in June 1902, Hartley resigned his commission on 26 November 1902.

He re-enlisted for service in the First World War, being wounded twice and mentioned in dispatches four times. He was awarded the Distinguished Service Order (DSO) in the 1919 New Year Honours.
