= Bert Vogler =

South African cricketer (1876–1946)

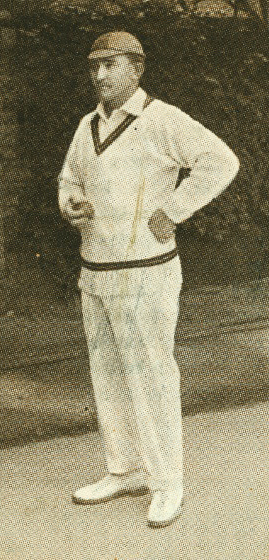
- Vogler in about 1912

Personal information
- Full name: Albert Edward Ernest Vogler
- Born: 28 November 1876; Swartwater, Queenstown, Cape Colony
- Died: 9 August 1946 (aged 69); Fort Napier, Pietermaritzburg, Natal Province, Union of South Africa
- Batting: Right-handed
- Bowling: Leg-break

International information
- National side: South Africa
- Test debut: 2 January 1906 v England
- Last Test: 17 February 1911 v Australia

Career statistics
Competition	Test	First-class
Matches	15	83
Runs scored	340	2,375
Batting average	17.00	20.29
100s/50s	0/2	1/8
Top score	65	103
Balls bowled	2,764	13,097
Wickets	64	393
Bowling average	22.73	18.27
5 wickets in innings	5	31
10 wickets in match	1	7
Best bowling	7/94	10/26
Catches/stumpings	20/–	81/–
- Source: Cricinfo, 29 May 2019

Albert Edward Ernest Vogler (28 November 1876 – 9 August 1946) was a South African cricketer. A leading all-rounder skilled both at batting and bowling, Vogler played cricket in South Africa prior to becoming eligible to play for Middlesex County Cricket Club in England after serving on the ground staff of the Marylebone Cricket Club at Lord's. He rose to prominence during the 1906 home Test series and then in England the following year: he was described during the latter as the best bowler in the world by Tip Foster, and named a Wisden Cricketer of the Year.

Renowned for his exploits on pitches suited to his bowling, Vogler found difficulty touring Australia where harder pitches inhibited his bowling and his batting. He did not play a first-class match following the end of the tour in the spring of 1911. The reasons for him not appearing in the Triangular Tournament in England in 1912 was because he had fallen out with Abe Bailey who was the principle financier of South Africa cricket. Their dispute dated back to the 1910/11 tour of Australia.

== Career ==
=== Early years ===
Vogler was born in Swartwater, Queenstown, Eastern Cape. He began his cricket career for Natal as an attacking lower order right-handed batsman and fast medium bowler before acquiring the googly from Reggie Schwarz on that player's return from England after the 1904 tour. In the 1904/1905 season Vogler played for Transvaal before in 1905 coming to England with the intention of qualifying for Middlesex. Vogler did not fulfill this intention, however, despite bowling so well in 1906 for MCC that in a very dry summer he took 63 wickets for less than twenty runs apiece, including nine for 44 against the West Indian tourists.

In between these two seasons for MCC, Vogler had played in the 1905/1906 Test series against England and had been extremely difficult against a second-string English team for South Africa, though he had few opportunities because of the form of Schwarz, Jimmy Sinclair and Tip Snooke. His batting, however, showed such development that he scored 62 not out going in last. Only Asif Masood since then has top scored in a Test innings batting at number eleven.

=== Development as an all-rounder ===
Returning again to South Africa to play for his third domestic team in Eastern Province, Vogler scored 505 runs at an average of 36 per innings, but he set a domestic season record with fifty-five wickets in nine games for the amazing average of 10.54. By this time, Vogler had improved upon the methods of Bosanquet and Schwarz, being able not only to at a faster pace disguise which way he was turning the ball, but to flight it with skill so that it would do things in the air that batsmen could not predict. Against Griqualand West in the 1906–07 Currie Cup, Vogler put in an all-round performance. Eastern Province batted upon winning the toss, and Vogler second top-scored with 79 to help his team to 403 all out. He then took 6/12 from ten overs as Griqualand West collapsed to 51 all out, and were asked to follow on. In the second innings, Vogler took all ten wickets for 26 runs, and Griqualand West were dismissed for 51 once more. Eastern Province finished as victors by an innings and 301 runs. Vogler's 10/26 remains the best first-class innings return ever achieved in South Africa, while his match figures of 16/38 have never been beaten for Eastern Province.

=== Wisden Cricketer of the Year ===
In 1907, Vogler went to England with one of the best bowling teams to tour that country, and did well in a summer of soft wickets which took all the spin he could get on the ball. Although he did not do as well as Schwarz or Gordon White in average, Tip Foster, a premier Worcestershire batsman playing semi-regularly for the only time after 1901, thought that Vogler was the most difficult bowler in the world. Vogler was named as a Wisden Cricketer of the Year in 1908, and when these statistics were posthumously compiled became the earliest South African to be named a Wisden Leading Cricketer in the World.

Although Vogler did not play any cricket after this until the 1908/1909 South African season, on the matting pitches the following season he reached his highest point against England with thirty-six wickets in the five Tests for 21.75 each, and fifty-eight for 19.12 in all matches against the tourists. Vogler also hit to that point the fastest fifty in the history of Test cricket, hitting George Thompson for 22 in a single over.

=== Fall in Australia, and retirement ===
However, the following season Vogler's reputation suffered. Touring Australia for the first time as a requirement to all for the proposed Triangular Tournament on 1912, Vogler could not cope with the extremely hard Australian pitches which allowed him no bite with which to spin the ball, nor with the instructions of Australia's captain Warwick Armstrong to hit the googly bowlers off their length at any cost. So ineffective was Vogler that he was left out of two of the Tests and took four wickets in the three he did play – and this in spite of the fact that two games were played on pitches affected by rain. He also failed as a batsman, averaging only nine an innings as against 21 in England in 1907 on much more difficult pitches.

Vogler never played first class cricket again. Moving to the British Isles on business, he did however play for a number of clubs in Scotland and Ireland until after World War I, and played one final first class match for the Woodbrook Club and Ground against his old teammates in 1912. He died in August 1946 from lobar pneumonia and brain disease.
