= George Dennett =

English cricketer

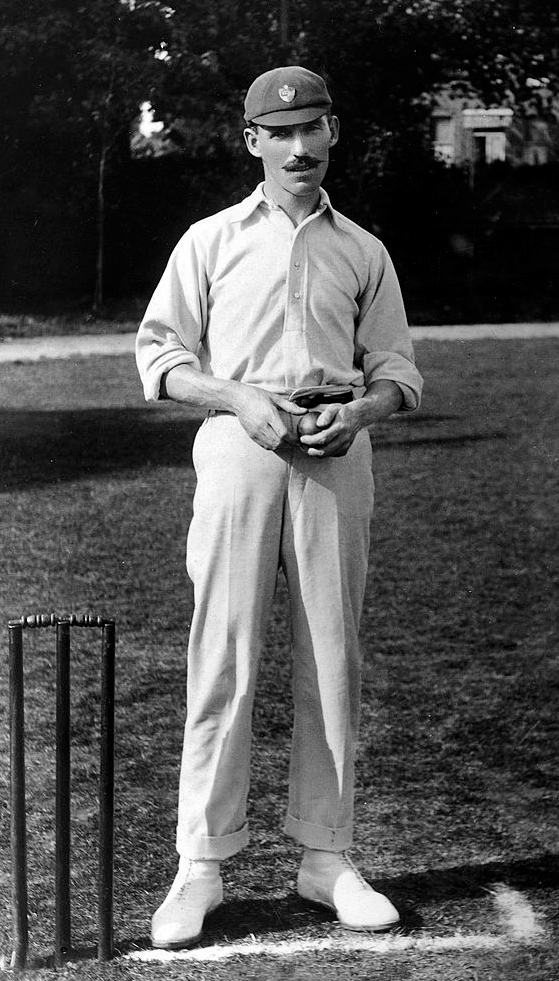
- Dennett in about 1905

Personal information
- Full name: Edward George Dennett
- Born: 27 April 1879; Upwey, Dorset, England
- Died: 15 September 1937 (aged 58); Leckhampton, Gloucestershire, England
- Batting: Left-handed
- Bowling: Slow left-arm orthodox

Career statistics
| Competition | First-class |
|---|---|
| Matches | 401 |
| Runs scored | 4,102 |
| Batting average | 10.33 |
| 100s/50s | 0/4 |
| Top score | 71 |
| Balls bowled | 98,606 |
| Wickets | 2,151 |
| Bowling average | 19.82 |
| 5 wickets in innings | 211 |
| 10 wickets in match | 57 |
| Best bowling | 10/40 |
| Catches/stumpings | 298/– |
- Source: CricketArchive, 20 August 2021

Edward George Dennett (27 April 1879 – 15 September 1937) was a left arm spinner for Gloucestershire County Cricket Club between 1903 and 1926, and from his figures could be considered one of the best bowlers to never play Test cricket. His career of 2,147 first-class wickets puts him 23rd on the all-time list of wicket-takers, and only Glamorgan's Don Shepherd took more wickets without being capped. Owing to the strength of the competition at the time, Dennett was never able to progress even to lower representative levels. Dennett also failed to be nominated as a Wisden Cricketer of the Year, and only Worcestershire’s Reg Perks took more first-class wickets without ever being chosen.

Born on 27 April 1879, Dennett began his cricket career in Scotland for the Grange club, but after a stint in the Army during the Boer War, was by 1902 playing club cricket in Bristol. There he was discovered by Gloucestershire captain Gilbert Jessop, and after trialing with Gloucestershire early in 1903, Dennett would gain a place in the team when former spinner Arthur Paish was dropped after having been no-balled for throwing. In his first season, despite exceptionally helpful pitches due to a very wet summer, Dennett fared poorly until August when he aided the veteran Roberts in Gloucestershire’s only three wins of the season. However, in 1904, Dennett rose rapidly to become one of the leading bowlers of the day, finishing with 123 wickets and in the top ten of the national averages. Dennett relied on gentle spin, accuracy of length and a quick but very easy and rhythmic arm action. He would usually bowl on off stump and turn away, relying on variations of flight, his considerable bounce, and his off-side fieldsmen for his wickets.

Throughout the period from 1904 to 1914, Dennett never failed to take 100 wickets for Gloucestershire. At times, they were as dependent on him as Kent were on Tich Freeman in the early 1930s. Their dependence was such that Gloucestershire refused to let Dennett tour South Africa with the MCC in 1905–06.

Dennett accomplished some amazing feats. The most famous of these was when he took eight wickets for three runs in 25 balls to dismiss Northamptonshire for 12 runs at Gloucester in 1907. Northamptonshire’s total remains the lowest team total in the history of county cricket, and Dennett took fifteen wickets for 21 runs in a single day. That season Dennett was the country’s leading wicket-taker with 201, but Colin Blythe was preferred to him in the Tests, and had been regarded as the superior bowler even when Dennett took over seventy wickets in the August of the dry 1906 summer. That year, Dennett achieved the rare feat of taking all ten wickets in an innings on a difficult pitch against Essex.

Joining the military to meet the demand for officers caused by World War I, Dennett would be stationed in India during the war and was obliged to remain there with his regiment when county cricket resumed in 1919. Although much was expected when he returned to England for the 1920 season, Dennett never really recovered his pre-war form — being helped to take 100 wickets again in 1921 by some abysmal county batting sides. In 1926, Dennett retired from the game to take up cricket coaching, though he did play three games for the county in August that year.

An all-round sportsman, he also excelled at soccer, fives, billiards and shooting. In retirement, his health soon deteriorated. He died at Leckhampton, Gloucestershire on 15 September 1937.
