= Walter Lees (cricketer) =

English cricketer

Cricket information
- Batting: Right-handed
- Bowling: Right-arm medium-fast

International information
- National side: England
- Test debut: 2 January 1906 v South Africa
- Last Test: 30 March 1906 v South Africa

Career statistics
Competition	Test	First-class
Matches	5	364
Runs scored	66	7,642
Batting average	11.00	17.13
100s/50s	0/0	2/17
Top score	25*	137
Balls bowled	1,256	69,778
Wickets	26	1,402
Bowling average	17.96	21.40
5 wickets in innings	2	97
10 wickets in match	0	20
Best bowling	6/78	9/81
Catches/stumpings	2/–	125/–
- Source: CricInfo, 19 November 2022

Walter Scott Lees (25 December 1875 – 10 September 1924) was a Surrey and England cricketer who played in five Test matches against South Africa in 1906. On his debut, he took five wickets in the first innings in Johannesburg.

== Biography ==
He was born on 25 December 1875 in Yorkshire. He learned his cricket in London and began his career with Surrey in 1896, but was regarded as merely promising until the following year when he took a regular place from the out-of-form William Lockwood and took 75 wickets despite being overshadowed by Tom Richardson. On two occasions his bowling was nonetheless a vital factor in Surrey winning or turning around matches.

The following few years, however, were very patchy and Lees struggled to maintain his place in the side against competition from the rejuvenated Lockwood and Bill Brockwell. He lost his place very early in 1898 and did not become a regular again until 1900, when performances like eight for 31 against Hampshire and nine wickets in a superb win over Lancashire showed he had the potential to be a major force. However, Lees was again disappointing in 1901 and almost completely lost his place in 1902 despite Surrey being dreadfully short of bowlers.

However, in the following year a performance of thirteen wickets for 75 runs against Cambridge University saw Lees finally establish himself as an integral part of the Surrey eleven. Although he only twice took five wickets in a County Championship innings, Lees not only took 102 wickets but developed his hard hitting sufficiently to be often valuable as a batsman for a team weakened immensely by the loss of Brockwell and Bobby Abel. 1904 saw Lees raised to the status of Surrey's chief bowler (except on sticky wickets) by the dropping out of Lockwood and Richardson, but by the standards of the day he was very expensive in most matches.

However, in 1905 Lees, aided by some fiery pitches at the Oval in July and August, rose far beyond what his previous performances would suggest. With improved accuracy, spin and life from the fast pitches he was the leading wicket-taker in England, falling only seven short of 200 first-class wickets at a price far below any he had previously managed. This earned Lees a Wisden Cricketer of the Year nomination in 1906, and he was chosen for a tour to South Africa. His batting remained on the same level as previous years, but he did hit a maiden century in fifty minutes against Hampshire, something he was to repeat a year later against Sussex. In 1906, though he took 168 wickets, Lees was overshadowed by the tremendous speed of Neville Knox on the dry but very true Oval pitches, but was believed by observers to be just as good as in 1905. In a famous match for the Players, Lees put on more pace than usual and took six wickets, whilst with 51 he proved better able to play Knox and Walter Brearley than most of the recognised professional batsmen.

Lees' 1907 season was affected by a strain that cost him a month's cricket and any chance of representative honours, whilst from 1908 inconsistency began to plague his bowling and his batting was no longer of value. Though he had some deadly days in 1909, it was clear Lees was on the way down, and by the end of 1910 he had lost his place in the Surrey side to Bill Hitch and Tom Rushby. After a few games in 1911, Lees was not re-engaged. He died in 1924 aged 48.
