= Frederick Fane =

English cricketer

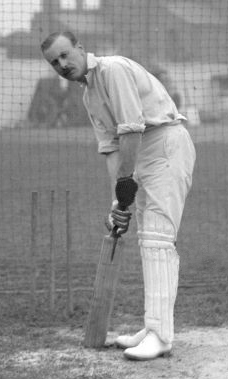
- Fane in 1912

Personal information
- Born: 27 April 1875; Curragh Camp, County Kildare, Ireland
- Died: 27 November 1960 (aged 85); Kelvedon Hatch, Essex, United Kingdom
- Batting: Right-handed

International information
- National side: England
- Test debut: 2 January 1906 v South Africa
- Last Test: 14 March 1910 v South Africa

Career statistics
| Competition | Test | First-class |
|---|---|---|
| Matches | 14 | 417 |
| Runs scored | 682 | 18,548 |
| Batting average | 26.23 | 27.39 |
| 100s/50s | 1/3 | 25/83 |
| Top score | 143 | 217 |
| Catches/stumpings | 6/– | 194/0 |
- Source: ESPN Cricinfo, 30 December 2021

Frederick Luther Fane, MC (27 April 1875 – 27 November 1960) played cricket for the England cricket team in 14 Test matches. He also played for Essex, Oxford University and London County.

Fane was born at Curragh Camp in County Kildare, Ireland, where his father Frederick John Fane, an officer in the British Army, was stationed with the 61st (South Gloucestershire) Regiment of Foot. He was a great-grandson of John Fane, a politician, of the family of the Earls of Westmorland. He was educated at Charterhouse School and Magdalen College, Oxford.

Fane captained the England cricket team on five occasions: three times when he took over from the injured Arthur Jones, and twice when he took over from H. D. G. Leveson Gower. He won two and lost three of these games.

He was the first Irish-born player to score a century in a Test match for England and remained the only one for over a hundred years, until Eoin Morgan repeated the feat against Pakistan at Trent Bridge in July 2010.

During the First World War Fane was commissioned in the West Yorkshire Regiment. He was awarded the Military Cross in 1917 "for conspicuous gallantry and devotion to duty while commanding a patrol. Having obtained valuable information, he withdrew his men from a difficult position under heavy machine gun fire. He displayed the greatest coolness and determination."

== See also ==
- List of Test cricketers born in non-Test playing nations
