= Arthur Jones (English cricketer) =

English cricketer and rugby union player

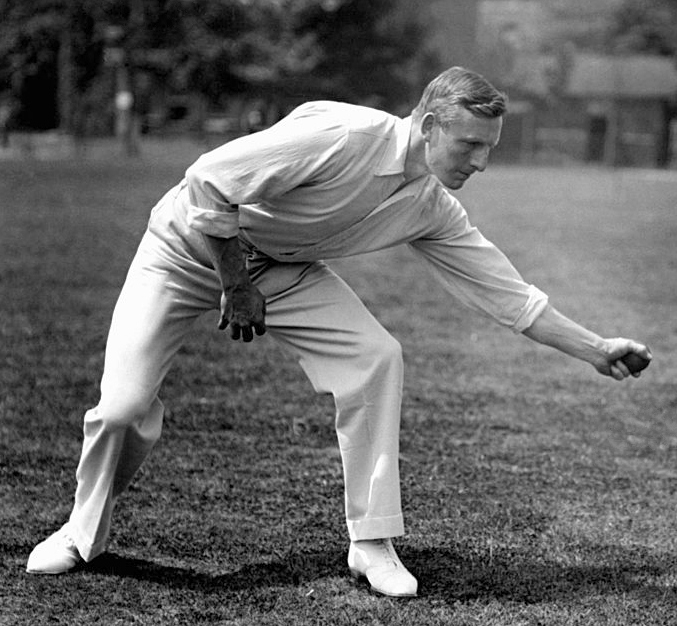
- Jones in about 1905

Personal information
- Full name: Arthur Owen Jones
- Born: 16 August 1872; Shelton, Nottinghamshire, England
- Died: 21 December 1914 (aged 42); Dunstable, Bedfordshire, England
- Batting: Right-handed
- Bowling: Right arm leg break

International information
- National side: England
- Test debut (cap 128): 14 August 1899 v Australia
- Last Test: 16 June 1909 v Australia

Domestic team information
- Years: Team
- 1892–1914: Nottinghamshire
- 1892–1893: Cambridge University
- 1901: London County

Career statistics
Competition	Test	First-class
Matches	12	472
Runs scored	291	22,935
Batting average	13.85	31.54
100s/50s	0/0	34/117
Top score	34	296
Balls bowled	228	18,116
Wickets	3	333
Bowling average	44.33	32.81
5 wickets in innings	0	8
10 wickets in match	0	1
Best bowling	3/73	8/71
Catches/stumpings	15/–	580/2
- Source: Cricinfo, 11 November 2008

Rugby union career
- Position: Full Back
Senior career
Years	Team	Apps	(Points)
1895–1910	Leicester	224	(563)

Arthur Owen Jones (16 August 1872 – 21 December 1914) was an English cricketer, noted as an all-rounder, and former Captain of England. He was also a rugby union player for Leicester at full back or three quarter.

== Early life ==
Jones was born in 1872 in Shelton, Nottinghamshire, and educated at Bedford Modern School and Jesus College, Cambridge.

== Cricket career ==
Jones played for Cambridge University, Nottinghamshire, London County and England. He was named Wisden Cricketer of the Year in 1900.

Jones was the first substitute to keep wicket in a Test match, when he did so against Australia at The Oval in 1905. He was a brilliant, sometimes impetuous, opening batsman and a leg-break and googly bowler. In 1903 he made what was then the highest-ever score by a Nottinghamshire batsman, scoring an unbeaten 296 against Gloucestershire at Trent Bridge, Nottingham. Jones played 12 Test matches for England, but lost the two games he captained. He led Nottinghamshire to the County Championship in 1907 and was captain of the 1907/08 England tour to Australia. But he only appeared in two matches because of illness. He remained captain of Nottinghamshire until a few months before his death from tuberculosis, in Dunstable, Bedfordshire.

== Rugby career ==
Jones made 15 appearances for Bedford between 1889 and 1895 before moving to Leicester Tigers in 1895. He was appointed captain between 1896 and 1899 and then again between 1902 and 1904. He was club captain when Tigers secured their first piece silverware, the Midlands Counties Cup, though missed the final through injury. He was captain in the victorious finals of 1899, 1903 and 1904 and played in the victorious final of 1900 and 1901. He became the first player to pass 500 points for the club against Moseley in 1903.

Between 1906 and 1912 he refereed 5 rugby internationals, including France's first test victory against Scotland in 1911.

== External reference ==
- Media related to Arthur Jones (cricketer) at Wikimedia Commons

Sporting positions
Preceded by Tip Foster	English national cricket captain 1907–1908	Succeeded by Archie MacLaren
Preceded by John Dixon	Nottinghamshire County cricket captain 1900–1914	Succeeded by Arthur Carr
