= Reggie Schwarz =

South African international cricketer & rugby union player

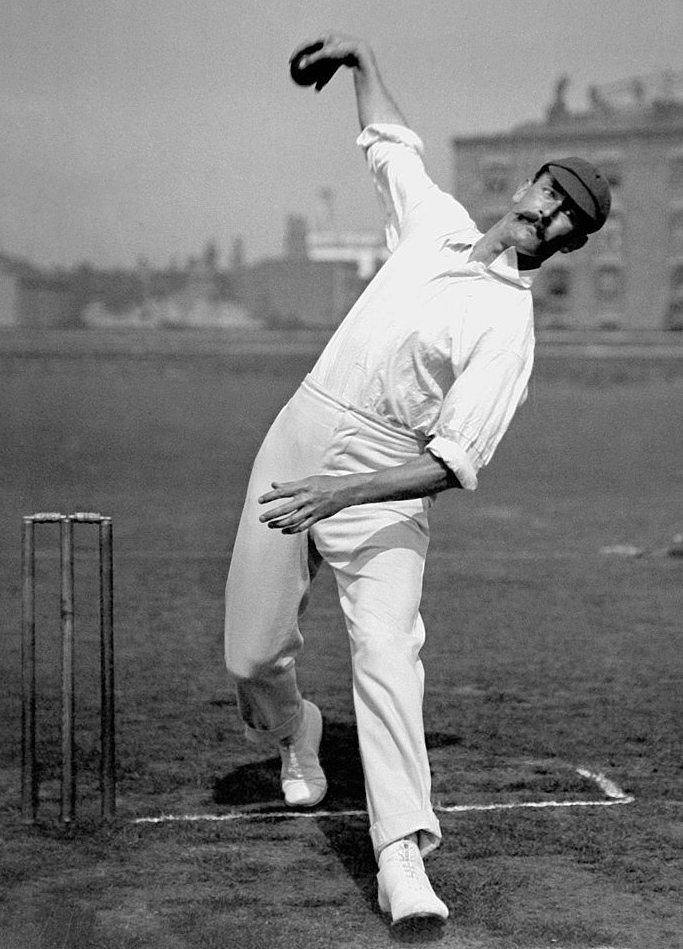
- Schwarz bowling in about 1905

Personal information
- Full name: Reginald Oscar Schwarz
- Born: 4 May 1875; Lee, London, England
- Died: 18 November 1918 (aged 43); Étaples, Pas-de-Calais, France
- Batting: Right-handed
- Bowling: Leg-break

International information
- National side: South Africa
- Test debut: 2 January 1906 v England
- Last Test: 15 July 1912 v Australia

Career statistics
Competition	Tests	FC
Matches	20	125
Runs scored	374	3,798
Batting average	13.85	22.60
100s/50s	0/1	1/20
Top score	61	102
Balls bowled	2,639	13,553
Wickets	55	398
Bowling average	25.76	17.58
5 wickets in innings	2	25
10 wickets in match	0	3
Best bowling	6/47	8/55
Catches/stumpings	18/–	108/–
- Source: CricketArchive, 29 May 2019

Major Reginald Oscar Schwarz MC (4 May 1875 – 18 November 1918), known as Reggie Schwarz, was a South African international cricketer and rugby union footballer.

== Early life ==
Schwarz was born in Lee in London in 1875, the son of Robert George Schwarz, a merchant from Breslau who lived in Bagshot in Surrey. Schwarz was educated at St Paul's School in London, and matriculated to Christ's College, Cambridge in 1893. While at Cambridge he joined the Cambridge University rugby team and in the Varsity Match of 1893 he won his only sporting Blue. Although Schwarz became better known as a cricketer than a rugby player, he did not win a Blue for cricket.

== Rugby career ==
Schwarz won three caps for England against Scotland in 1899, and Wales and Ireland in 1901. At club level, Schwarz played for Richmond and in the 1896–97 season was invited to play for the Barbarians.

== Cricket career ==
Schwarz played a handful of games for Middlesex County Cricket Club in 1901 and 1902 before emigrating to South Africa where he played for Transvaal. It was on his return to England with the South African cricket team in 1904 that he made his mark, having learned from Bernard Bosanquet how to bowl the googly. Unusually, he bowled it as his stock delivery, with considerable success: in 1904 and 1907 he topped the bowling averages, in the latter year taking 137 wickets at just 11.70 apiece, and he was named as a Wisden Cricketer of the Year in 1908. On that 1907 tour, the first on which South Africa played Tests in England, they had no fewer than four leg-break and googly bowlers, Schwarz having passed on the secret of the googly to Aubrey Faulkner, Bert Vogler and Gordon White.

Schwarz retired from playing regularly after the 1912 season, although he appeared three times for L Robinson's XI over the next two seasons. In all he took 398 wickets at a bowling average of 17.58, and in Tests he took 55 wickets at 22.60. Schwarz made one first class century: 102 runs scored in a non-Test game against an England XI at Lord's in 1904.

== Personal and military career ==
Schwarz was a member of the London stock exchange from 1899 to 1902, before joining South African Railways in 1902 after his move to South Africa. From 1904 to 1911, he was a Member of the South African stock exchange until he rejoined the London stock exchange on his return to Britain.

Schwarz was a Major in the King's Royal Rifle Corps of the British Army and fought on the Western Front in World War I. He was given the role of Deputy Assistant Quartermaster General and was Assistant Controller of Salvage. For his actions during the war he was Mentioned in Despatches and was awarded the Military Cross. He survived the war, but died in the Spanish flu epidemic at Étaples in northern France just seven days after the Armistice had been signed. He was 43.

== See also ==
- List of international rugby union players killed in action during the First World War
