= Gordon White (cricketer) =

South African cricketer (1882–1918)

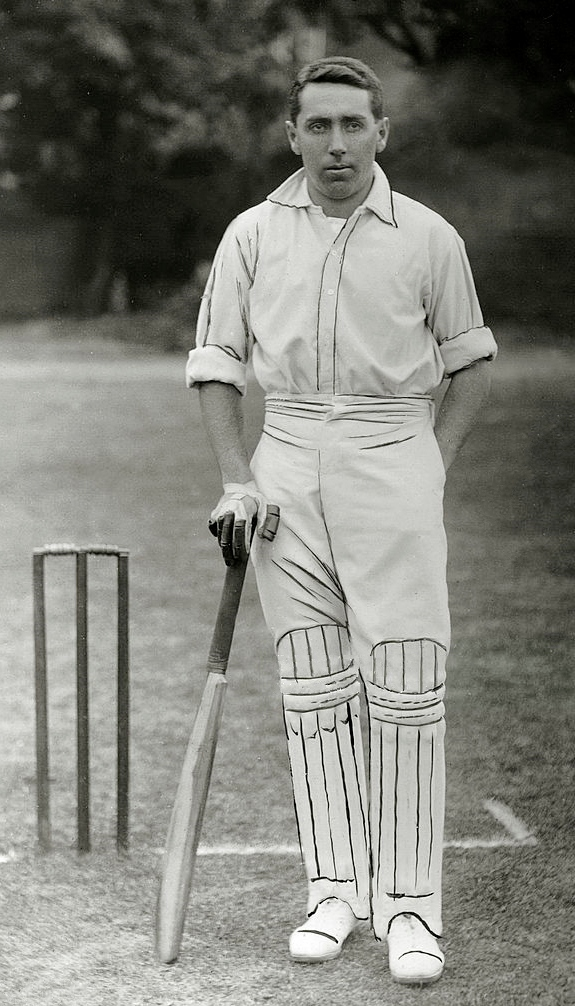
- White pictured in about 1905

Personal information
- Born: 5 February 1882; Port St. Johns, Cape Colony
- Died: 17 October 1918 (aged 36); Gaza City, Ottoman Palestine
- Batting: Right-handed
- Bowling: Legbreak

International information
- National side: South Africa
- Test debut: 2 January 1906 v England
- Last Test: 12 August 1912 v England

Career statistics
Competition	Test	First-class
Matches	17	97
Runs scored	872	3,740
Batting average	30.06	27.70
100s/50s	2/4	4/17
Top score	147	162*
Balls bowled	498	5,323
Wickets	9	155
Bowling average	33.44	20.05
5 wickets in innings	0	8
10 wickets in match	0	2
Best bowling	4/47	7/33
Catches/stumpings	10/–	46/–
- Source: CricketArchive, 1 September 2011

Gordon Charles White (5 February 1882 – 17 October 1918) was a South African cricketer who played in 17 Test matches from 1906 to 1912. He served as an officer in the 1st Battalion, Cape Corps in the First World War, and died of wounds in Gaza, Palestine.

== Cricket ==
White was born in Port St Johns, Cape Colony. He played domestic first-class cricket for Transvaal from 1902. He was a free-hitting batsman and occasional leg-spin bowler.

He played Test cricket for South Africa against England in 1905–06 and 1909–10, and was a member of the South African teams that toured England in 1904 and 1907 and in 1912 for the Triangular Tournament. On the 1904 tour to England he scored 937 runs in first-class matches, with a batting average of 30, including 115 against Nottinghamshire, but did not play a Test. He played in the five Tests at home against England in 1905–06, scoring 147 in the 3rd Test at Johannesburg, and two half-centuries.

He played in three Tests in the 1907 tour. He was generally less successful as a batsman than in 1904, scoring only 15 runs in five Test innings, but he scored 162 not out against Gloucestershire. He achieved more success as a leg-spin bowler, taking 72 wickets at a bowling average of 13. He played in four Tests against England in 1909–10, reaching 118 at Durban. He played in five Tests in the Triangular Tournament of 1912, but he did not achieve much with the bat or the ball.

== First World War ==
He joined the South African Army in the First World War, and was erroneously gazetted as a captain in the 1st Battalion, Cape Corps in August 1916, over several more senior officers. He chose to be reduced in rank voluntarily to lieutenant in December 1916. He served at Morogoro in the East African Campaign in 1916–17, returning to South African on the hospital ship Oxfordshire in July 1917. In March 1918, he was sent with his unit to Egypt to join the 160th Brigade. He was wounded in the bayonet charge on Turkish troops at Khan Jibeit near Jerusalem on 20 September 1918, part of the Battle of Megiddo, and died at the 47th Stationary Hospital in Gaza, Palestine, nearly a month later. He was buried in Gaza.
