= Cartledge (disambiguation) =

Cartledge is a hamlet in Derbyshire, England.

Cartledge may also refer to:

== Places ==
- Cartledge Hall and Cartledge Grange, in Holmesfield, Derbyshire, England; see Notable Buildings in Holmesfield
- Mount Cartledge, a mountain in the Athos Range, Prince Charles Mountains, Antarctica
- Cartledge House, an historic house in Batesburg-Leesville, Lexington County, South Carolina

== People ==
- Brian Cartledge (1941–2004), Australian cricketer
- Bryan Cartledge (born 1931), British diplomat
- David Cartledge (born 1956), English cricketer
- Frank Cartledge (1899–?), English footballer
- Geoff Cartledge, Australian rules footballer
- Graham S Cartledge, High Sheriff of Nottinghamshire 2014-2015
- Gwendolyn Cartledge, American educationist and academic
- Horace Avron Cartledge, British Senior Overseas Inspector, Education Division; see 1967 Birthday Honours
- Jack Pickering Cartledge, Australian public servant; see 1947 Birthday Honours
- John Cartledge, English cricketer
- John Cartledge (footballer), English footballer
- Paul Cartledge, British ancient historian and academic
- Paul Cartledge (music producer), English record producer
- Sam Cartledge, English footballer
- Tristan Cartledge, Australian rules footballer
- Vincent Cartledge Reddish, British astronomer

== See also ==
- Meryl Cartlege and Anita Cartlege, characters in the TV series Springhill
- Cartlidge, including Cartlich
