= Carbon (disambiguation) =

Carbon is a chemical element with symbol C and atomic number 6.

Carbon may also refer to:

== Entertainment ==
- Carbon (2017 film), French film
- Carbon (2018 film), Indian Malayalam-language film
- Carbon (2022 Indian film), Tamil-language film
- Carbon (2022 Moldovan film), Romanian-language film
- Carbon (Halo team)

== Science ==
=== Chemistry ===
- Carbon black, a filler often used to improve the properties of rubber or plastic compounds
- Carbon chauvinism, a term meant to disparage the assumption that the molecules responsible for the mechanisms of life must be based on carbon
- Carbon (fiber), can refer to carbon filament thread, or to felt or woven cloth made from those carbon filaments
- Carbon offset, a reduction in emissions of carbon dioxide
- Isotopes of carbon
- Carbon dioxide equivalent, a greenhouse gas measurement
- "Carbon", shorthand for radiative forcings which effect the carbon cycle and increase global warming, such as greenhouse gases

=== Computers and electronics ===
- Carbon (API), a deprecated application programming interface for Mac OS X
- Need for Speed: Carbon, a computer racing game developed by Electronic Arts
- ThinkPad X1 Carbon, a notebook computer released by Lenovo
- Rio Carbon, a product line of digital audio players
- WSO2 Carbon, an open-source middleware platform
- Carbon (programming language), an experimental general-purpose programming language
- Gemini 4 Carbon, a large language model

== People ==
- Lolita Carbon (born 1957), Filipino singer, member of Asin

== Places ==
=== Canada ===
- Carbon, Alberta, a village in Kneehill County

=== United States ===
- Carbon, Indiana, a town in Clay County
- Carbon, Iowa, a city in Adams County
- Carbon, Pennsylvania
- Carbon, Texas, a town in Eastland County
- Carbon County (disambiguation), multiple places

== Other uses ==
- Carbon (journal)
- Carbon 15, a family of firearms
- Carbon Motors Corporation, an American automotive corporation
- Corral del Carbón, a building in Granada, Andalusia, Spain
- Carbon (company), a technology company that manufactures 3D printers
- Carbon (programming language), an experimental programming language started at Google

== See also ==
- Carbonation
- Carboniferous, a geologic timescale
- Karbon (disambiguation)
- C (disambiguation)
- Carlon
