= Carton (surname) =

Carton is a surname. Notable people and characters with the surname include:

== People ==
- Craig Carton (born 1969), American radio personality
- Davy Carton (born 1959), Irish singer, songwriter and rhythm guitarist
- Gordon Carton (1921–2017), Canadian politician
- John J. Carton (1856–1934), American politician
- Michael Carton (born 1984), Irish hurler
- Noel Carton (born 1981), Irish hurling goalkeeper
- Paul Carton (1875–1947), French physician
- Pauline Carton (1884–1974), French film actress
- Peadar Carton, Irish hurler
- Raoul Carton (fl. 1920s), French philosopher
- Rick Carton (born 1967), American book illustrator
- Victor Carton (1902–1970), Irish politician

== Fictional characters ==
- Sydney Carton, hero of Charles Dickens' novel A Tale of Two Cities

== See also ==
- Carlon
- Cartan (disambiguation), a surname (and a crater)
- Cartin, a surname
- Carton de Wiart, a surname of Belgian origin
- McCartan, a surname of Irish origin believed to be the forefather of Carton
