= Karbon =

Karbon may refer to:

- Denise Karbon (born 1980), Italian skier
- Fadel Karbon (born 1992), Norwegian footballer
- Karbon (software), vector graphic editor
- Karbon, Iran, a village in Mazandaran Province, Iran
- Siah Karbon, village in Iran
- Karbon Homes, housing association in England

== See also ==
- Korban, sacrificial offerings in Judaism
- Karbonn Mobiles, Indian mobile phone company
- Carbon (disambiguation)
