= Cardon =

Cardon may refer to:

- Cardon (surname)
- CarDon & Associates, operator of senior housing facilities
- Cardon cactus, a list of cacti
- Cardon V. Burnham (1927–2005), American composer, arranger, conductor, and performer
- a subdivision of C. A. Rosetti, Tulcea, Romania

== See also ==
- Cardón (disambiguation)
- Cardoon, an artichoke of the sunflower family
