= Caslon (disambiguation) =

Caslon usually refers to William Caslon (I) of United Kingdom (1692–1766), who was an English gunsmith and designer of typographic fonts.

Caslon may also refer to:

- Lucy Caslon, (since April 2014 Lucy Herron) the founding trustee of the London-based charity Msizi Africa.
- Caslon Type Foundry
- Caslon, a family of typeface, created by William Caslon.
- Caslon Antique, a decorative American typeface that was designed in 1894 by Berne Nadall.
- Caslon Roman, a Unicode typeface, designed by George Williams.
- Elizabeth Caslon (I) a typographer who died in 1795
- Elizabeth Caslon (died 1833) (II) a typographer, daughter in law of Elizabeth Caslon (I) who died in 1833

== See also ==
- Carlon
