= Catledge =

Catledge is a surname. Notable people with the name include:

- Dick Catledge (1920–2007), U.S. Air Force general
- Terry Catledge (born 1983), American basketball player
- Turner Catledge (1901–1983), American journalist

== See also ==
- Cartledge (disambiguation) § People
