= Carlon =

Carlon is a given name and surname. Notable people referred to by this name include the following:

== Given name ==
- Carlon Blackman (born 1965), Barbadian sprinter
- Carlon Brown (born 1989), American basketball player
- Carlon Colker (born 1965), American celebrity doctor
- Carlon Jeffery (born 1993), American actor and rapper

== Surname ==
- Fran Carlon (1913–1993), American actress
- Ken Carlon (1923–2004), Australian rules footballer
- Mark Carlon (born 1953), Australian rules footballer
- Patricia Carlon (1927–2002), Australian writer
- Tom Carlon (born 1987), English ice hockey player

== See also ==
- Cardon (surname)
- Carlen (surname)
- Carlin (name)
- Carlo (name)
- Carlone
- Carloni
- Carlos (given name)
- Carlos (surname)
- Carlson (name)
- Carlton (name)
- Carlyon (surname)
- Caron (name)
- Carson (given name)
- Carson (surname)
- Carton (surname)
- Carbon (disambiguation)
- Carlow (disambiguation)
- Carron (disambiguation)
- Caslon (disambiguation)
