= Cartin =

Cartin is the surname of:

- Carlos Durán Cartín (1852–1924), Vice President and acting President of Costa Rica and a doctor
- Paul Cartin (born 1981), Irish Gaelic footballer

== See also ==
- Cartan (disambiguation)
- Carton (surname)
- McCartan, a surname of Irish origin believed to be the forefather of Cartin
