= Cardon (surname) =

Cardon is a surname. Notable people with the surname include:

- Antoine Cardon (1739–1822), Belgian painter
- Lon Cardon, American geneticist
- Pierre Cardon (1894–?), French World War I balloon buster
- Rebecca Cardon (born 1975), American actress
- Roland Cardon (1929–2001), Belgian composer and musician
- Sam Cardon, American composer
- Zoe G. Cardon, American ecosystems ecologist

== See also ==
- Cardon (disambiguation)
- Carlon
