= Carlyon (surname) =

Carlyon is a surname. Notable people with the surname include:

- Harrison Carlyon (born 2001), Jersey cricketer
- Les Carlyon (1942–2019), Australian writer and newspaper editor
- Loveday Carlyon, Cornish nationalist politician
- Norman Carlyon (born 1938), Australian cricketer
- Phillip H. Carlyon (1863–1946), American politician
- Richard Carlyon (1930–2006), American artist
- Tom Carlyon (1902–1982), Australian rules footballer
- Tom Carlyon (musician), Australian musician, formerly of the Melbourne band The Devastations
- Tony Carlyon (born 1970), Jersey cricketer

== See also ==
- Carlon
