= United States Air Force Thunderbirds =

Air demonstration squadron of the United States Air Force

Thunderbirds USAF Air Demonstration Squadron
- United States Air Force Thunderbirds emblem
- Active: 25 May 1953 – present (as air demonstration squadron); 13 June 1917 – 1 February 1963 (as operational squadron)
- Country: United States
- Branch: United States Air Force
- Role: Aerobatic display team
- Size: 12 officers 132 enlisted support personnel 3 civilian support personnel
- Part of: Air Combat Command
- Garrison/HQ: Nellis Air Force Base; Las Vegas, Nevada
- Nickname: "TBirds"
- Colors: Red, White and Blue
- Engagements: World War I World War II (Pacific Theater) Korean War
- Website: Official website

Commanders
- Commander/Leader: Lt. Col Nathan Malafa
- CEM: CMSgt Harvey McReynolds

Aircraft flown
- Fighter: six F-16C Fighting Falcons two F-16D Fighting Falcons

The USAF Air Demonstration Squadron is the air demonstration squadron of the United States Air Force. The Thunderbirds, as they are colloquially known, are assigned to the 57th Wing, and are based at Nellis Air Force Base, Nevada. Created 73 years ago in 1953, the USAF Thunderbirds are the third-oldest formal flying aerobatic team (under the same name) in the world, after the French Air Force Patrouille de France formed in 1931 and the United States Navy Blue Angels formed in 1946.

The Thunderbirds Squadron tours the United States and much of the world, performing aerobatic formation and solo flying in specially marked aircraft. The squadron's name is taken from the creature that appears in the mythologies of several indigenous North American cultures.

== Overview ==
The Thunderbirds Squadron is a named USAF squadron, meaning it does not carry a numerical designation. It is also one of the oldest squadrons in the Air Force, its origins dating to the organization of the 30th Aero Squadron, formed at Kelly Field, Texas, on 13 June 1917.

Officers serve a two-year assignment with the squadron, while enlisted personnel serve three to four years. Because the squadron performs no more than 88 air demonstrations each year, replacements must be trained for about half of the team each year, in order to provide a constant mix of experience. In addition to their air demonstration responsibilities, the Thunderbirds are part of the USAF combat force and if required, can be rapidly integrated into an operational fighter unit. Since 15 February 1974 the Thunderbirds have been a component of the 57th Wing at Nellis AFB. Since 1953, they have flown in front of more than 300 million people.

=== F-16 Fighting Falcon ===
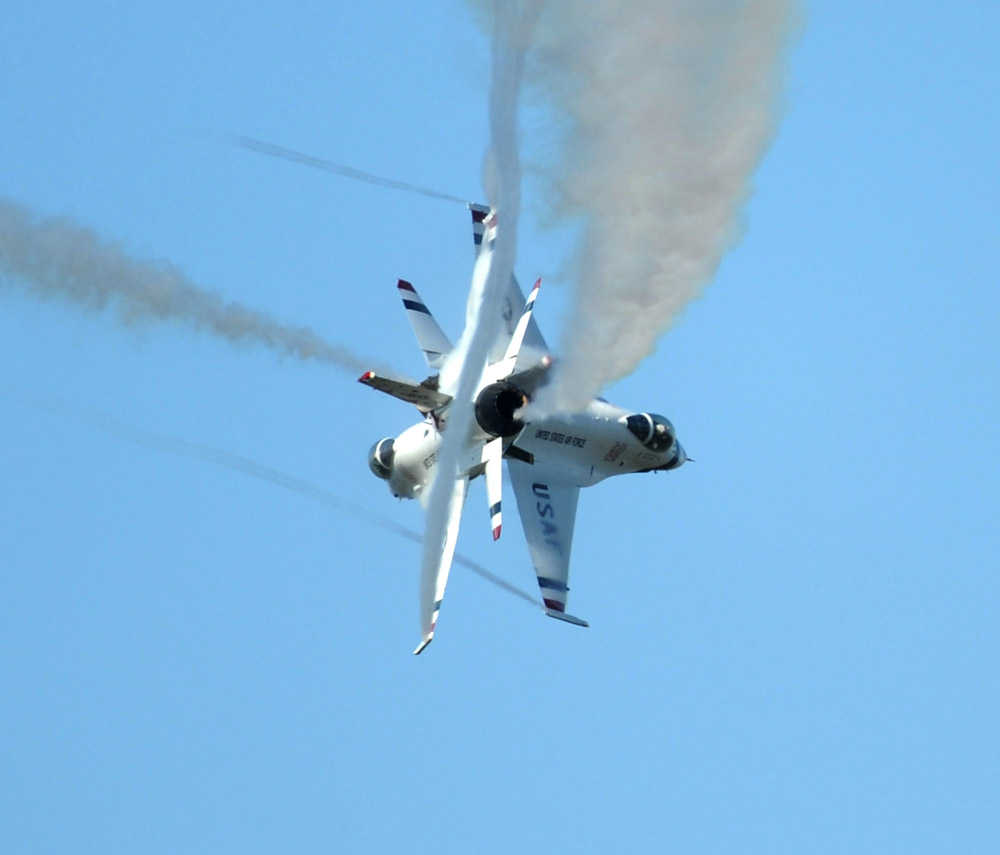
The Thunderbirds performing the crossover break

The Thunderbirds perform aerial demonstrations in the F-16C Fighting Falcon, and they also fly two F-16D twin-seat trainers.

The F-16 has been the demonstration aircraft for the Thunderbirds since the 1983 season. In January 1982, four members of the squadron were killed in what became known as the "Diamond Crash" of T-38 Talon aircraft which the squadron had flown since 1974. Partially as a result of that accident, the squadron switched to the F-16A, and sat out the 1982 airshow season and spent that year retraining and transitioning over to the new aircraft to ready themselves for the 1983 season. The F-16, however, had been considered for transition prior to the accident. In rebuilding the Thunderbird Team, the Air Force recruited previous Thunderbird pilots, qualified each in the F-16A, and had them begin by flying "two-ship" maneuvers, then expanded the program one airplane at a time up to the full six airplanes. Beginning in June 1982, the F-16 Thunderbirds were led by Major Jim Latham.

The team continues to fly the F-16, having switched from the F-16A to the F-16C in 1992. Only a few minor modifications differentiate a Thunderbird from an operational F-16C. These include the replacement of the 20 mm cannon and ammunition drum with a smoke-generating system, including its plumbing and control switches, the removal of the jet fuel starter exhaust door, and the application of the Thunderbirds' glossy red, white, and blue polyurethane paint scheme. All the modification work is performed at the maintenance depot at Hill AFB near Ogden, Utah. Other than those modifications, the aircraft are taken from the standard USAF inventory as production fighters, and can be returned to an operational squadron in short order without any major modification.

General Dynamics F-16A/B Fighting Falcon

During the switch to the F-16A the Thunderbirds acquired new block 15 aircraft which they operated from 1983 to 1991, making the team one of the last USAF units flying the older F-16As before transitioning into new Cs. They also operated the two-seat F-16B during this time for training new pilots and for VIP flights, these being replaced by the F-16D when the rest of the squadron transitioned to the F-16C.
Lockheed Martin F-16C/D Fighting Falcon (Block 32)
The block 32H/J aircraft assigned to the Thunderbirds were built in 1986 and 1987, and operated by the Thunderbirds from 1992 to 2008. At their retirement, they were some of the oldest operational F-16s in the Air Force.
Lockheed Martin F-16C/D Fighting Falcon (Block 52)
In the 2009 show season the Thunderbirds transitioned to an updated version of the F-16 fighter. The Block 52s have an upgraded avionics package that brings the Thunderbird fleet into alignment with the rest of the worldwide F-16 fleet. Additionally, the more powerful Pratt & Whitney F100-PW-229 engine adds an additional 3,600 lb_{f} of thrust. This in turn increases the maximum allowable gross weight for ground handling, taxi, takeoff and in-flight maneuvers by nearly 5,000 lb.

=== Support aircraft ===
- Boeing C-17 Globemaster III

== Demonstration routine ==
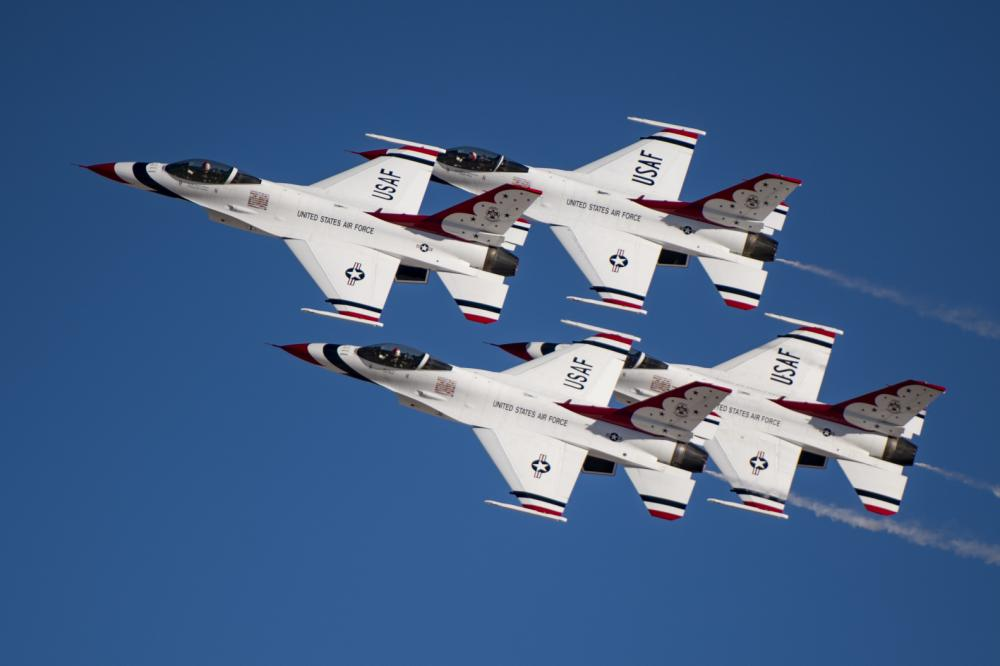
The Thunderbirds perform the Diamond Pass-In-Review at the Aviation Nation airshow at Nellis AFB, NV on November 6, 2022.

From the end of the runway the four-ship Thunderbird team get ready to begin their takeoff roll with the words "Thunderbirds, let's run em up!" being retransmitted from the team leader's mic through the PA system for the crowd to hear.

Diamond: Historically, as Thunderbirds 1 through 4 lift off, the slot aircraft slips immediately into position behind 1 to create the signature Diamond formation. Thanks to the 2009 upgrade to the Block 52, the Diamond now has more than enough thrust to continue to climb straight up into their first maneuver, the Diamond Loop.

Solos: Thunderbird 5 takes to the air next, performing a clean low altitude aileron roll, followed by 6 who performs a split S, climbing in a near vertical maneuver, rolling over and diving back toward show center and pulling up just above the runway to exit in the opposite direction.

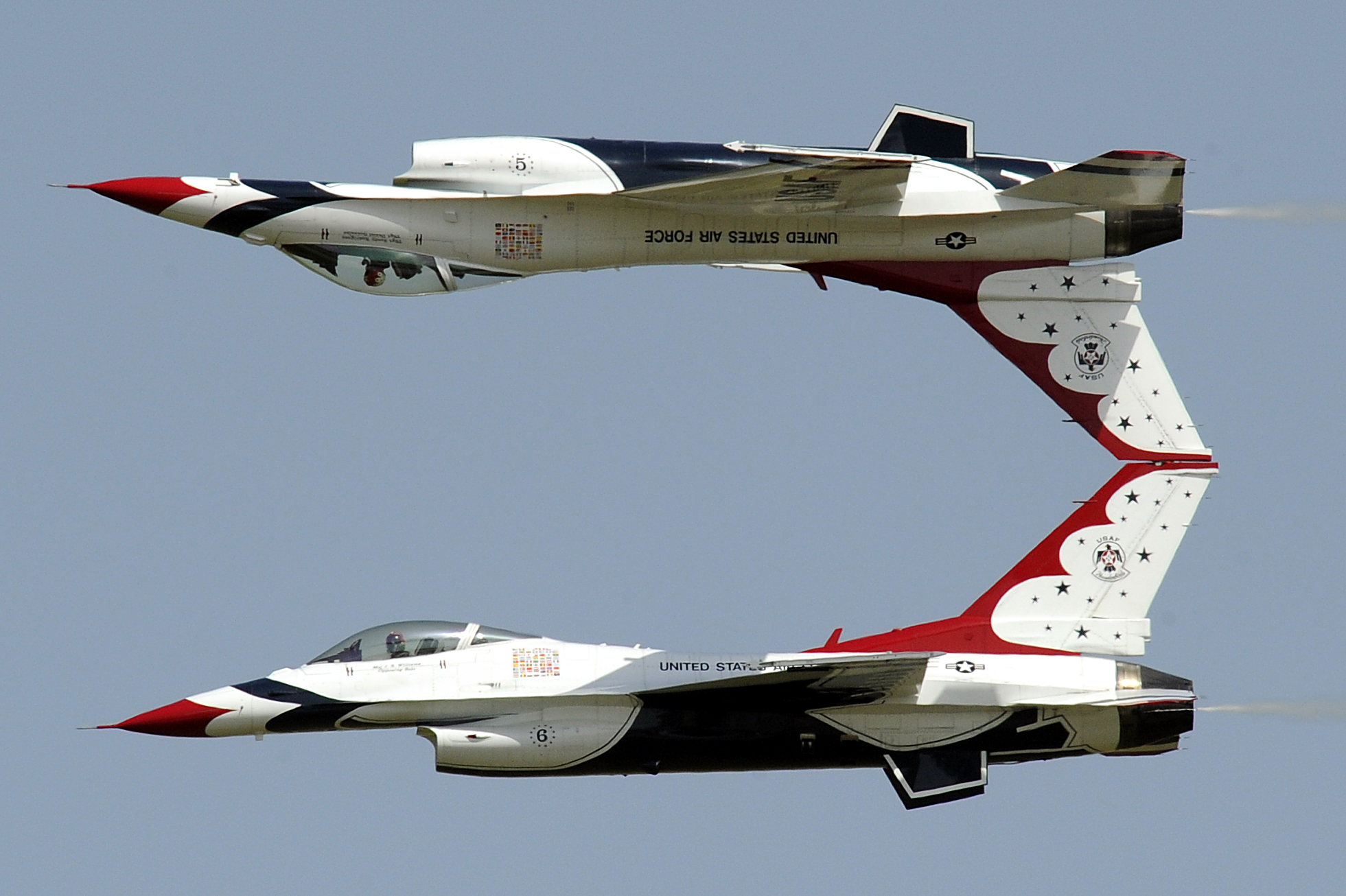
Two Thunderbirds perform a calypso pass.

Much of the Thunderbirds' display alternates between maneuvers performed by the diamond, and those performed by the solos. They have a total of eight different formations: The Diamond, Delta, Stinger, Arrowhead, Line-Abreast, Trail, Echelon and the Five Card. The Arrowhead involves maneuvers in tight formation with as little as 18 inches (46 cm) fuselage to canopy separation. They perform formation loops and rolls or transitions from one formation to another. All maneuvers are performed at speeds of 450 to 500 mph (720 to 800 km/h).

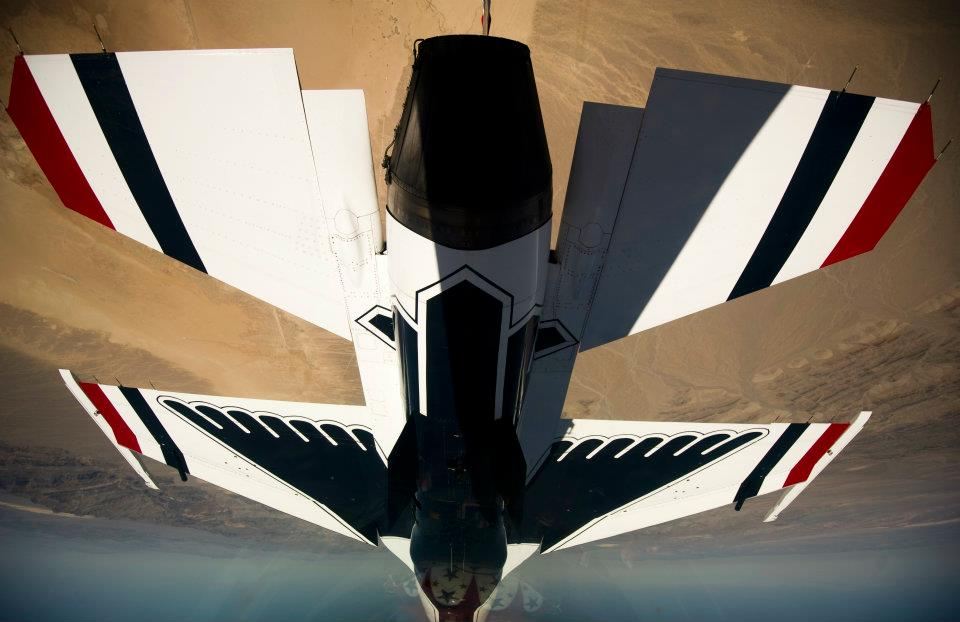
A TB4 slot pilot flies as close as 18 inches to the commander, TB1, during the arrowhead loop.

The opposing solos usually perform their maneuvers just under the speed of sound (500 to 700 mph (800 to 1,130 km/h)), and show off the capabilities of their individual aircraft by doing maneuvers such as fast passes, slow passes, fast rolls, slow rolls, and very tight turns. Some of their maneuvers include both solo aircraft at once, such as opposing passes (passing in close proximity to each other) and mirror formations (two aircraft being flown back-to-back in the calypso pass or belly-to-belly). In mirror formations, one Thunderbird must be inverted, and it is always number 5. In fact, the number 5 on this aircraft is painted upside-down, and thus appears right-side-up for much of the routine. There is also an extra piece of humor regarding the inverted performance of Thunderbird 5: the pilots all wear tailored flight suits with their name and jet number embroidered on the left breast. The suit for the pilot of the number 5 airplane has the number sewn upside-down.

Nearing the end the Diamond pulls straight up into the vertical to perform the signature "Bomb Burst", where all four aircraft break off in separate directions while a solo goes straight up through the maneuver and performs aileron rolls until 3 miles (4.8 km) above the ground. At the end of the routine, all six aircraft join in formation, forming the Delta.

One of the Thunderbirds' standing engagements is the annual commencement ceremony at the United States Air Force Academy in Colorado Springs. The jets fly over Falcon Stadium at the precise moment the cadets throw their hats into the air at ceremony's end.

== History ==
On 19 September 1985, the USAF Air Demonstration Squadron was consolidated by Air Force Historical Research Agency (AFHRA) with the 30th Bombardment Squadron, a unit which was organized on 13 June 1917.

During its operational history, the 30th served in World War I as a training unit in France, its mission to train fighter pilots to go into combat on the Western Front. The squadron was almost torpedoed on its troop ship crossing the Atlantic Ocean. Stationed at Clark Field in the Philippines on 7 December 1941, it was almost wiped out in the 1941 Battle of the Philippines. Some members of the squadron fought as an infantry unit and were captured by the Japanese, being subjected to the Bataan Death March. The squadron was withdrawn to Australia, being reformed and later attacked Japan as a B-29 Superfortress squadron in 1945. It was awarded nine Presidential Unit Citations in World War II. During the Korean War, the 30th attacked North Korean targets with B-29's.

Present-day USAF Thunderbirds carry the lineage, history, and honors of the 30th on active duty.

=== USAF Thunderbirds history ===
==== F-84 Thunderjet/Thunderstreak era ====
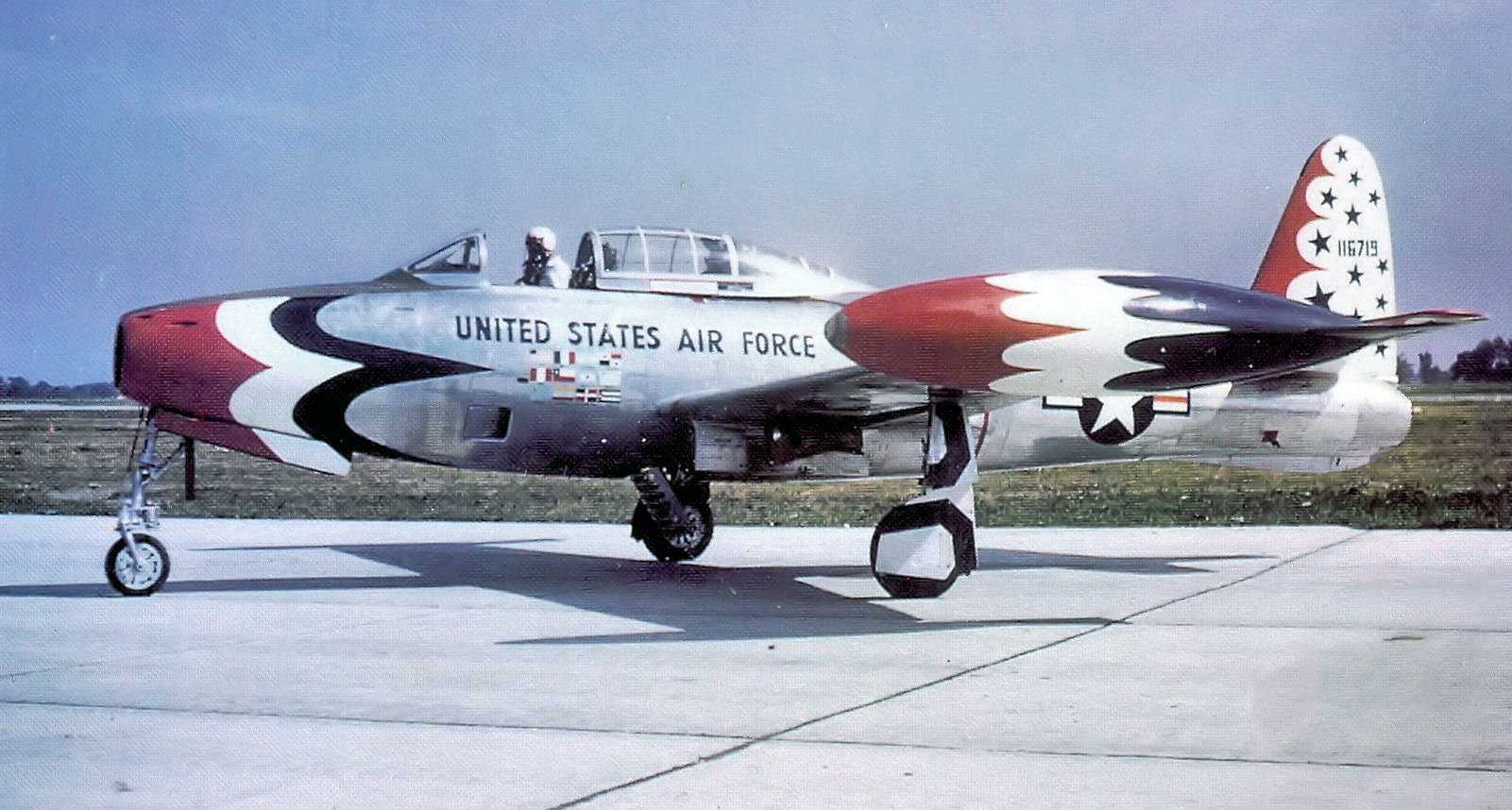
Republic F-84G Thunderjet 51-16719, flown by the Thunderbirds in 1954

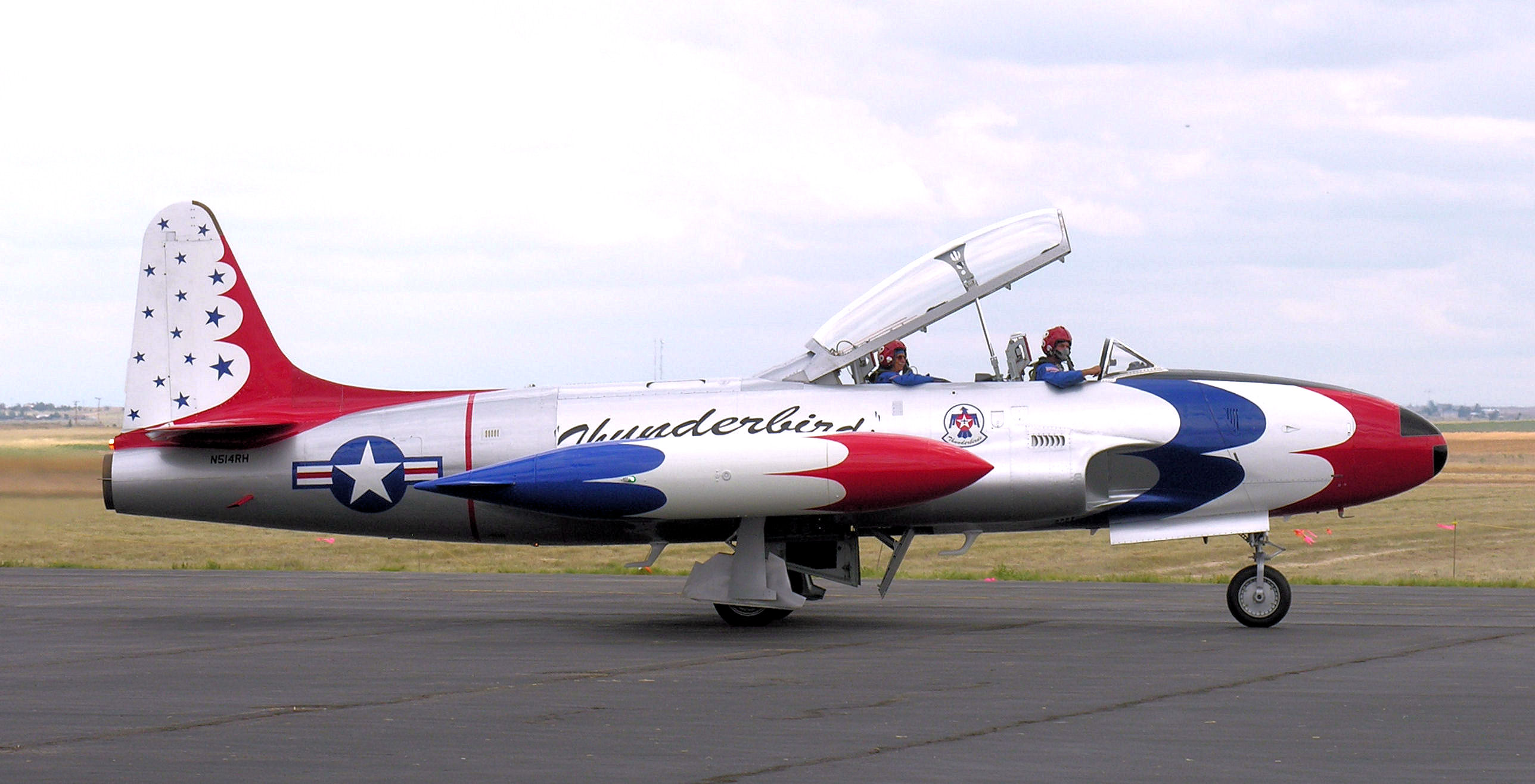
T-33A Shooting Star narrator/VIP/Press ride aircraft

After six months training in an unofficial status, the Thunderbirds were activated on 25 May 1953 as the 3600th Air Demonstration Team at Luke AFB, just west of Phoenix.

The team had flown 26 shows by that August. The first team leader was Major Richard C. Catledge (1953–1954), and the first plane used by the unit was the straight-wing F-84G Thunderjet. Because the Thunderjet was a single-seat fighter, a two-seat T-33 Shooting Star served as the narrator's aircraft and was used as the VIP/Press ride aircraft. The T-33 served with the Thunderbirds in this capacity in the 1950s and 1960s.

The next year the Thunderbirds performed their first overseas air shows, in a tour of South and Central America, and added a permanent solo routine to the demonstration. In the spring of 1955, under their second commander/leader (September 1954 – February 1957), Captain Jacksel M. Broughton, they moved to the swept-wing F-84F Thunderstreak aircraft, in which they performed 91 air shows, and received their first assigned support aircraft, a C-119 Flying Boxcar.

==== F-100 Super Sabre era ====
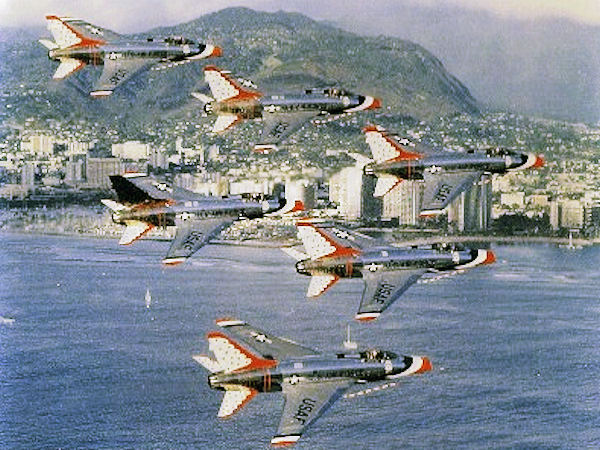
F-100 Super Sabres, 1966

The Thunderbirds' aircraft were again changed in June 1956, to the F-100C Super Sabre, which gave the team supersonic capability. This switch was accompanied by a relocation of their headquarters to Nellis AFB, Nevada on 1 June because of maintenance and logistical difficulties of basing the F-100s at Luke, with their first show after the move being held on 23 June. It also signaled a shift in their performance routine—for example, the Cuban Eight opening routine was dropped, and emphasis was placed on low, screaming flyovers and demonstrations of takeoff performance. For a time, if the show's sponsor permitted it, the pilots would create a sonic boom; this ended when the Federal Aviation Administration (FAA) banned supersonic flight over the continental United States. The move to Nellis also resulted in the first assignment of buildings and hangar space to the team.

This practice remained in force through the 1973 season. In 1961, the team was compelled to discontinue the vertical bank maneuver due to an FAA regulation prohibiting aerobatics that pointed the nose of the aircraft toward the crowd. The year 1962 saw the introduction of dual solo routines, and the Thunderbirds went on their first European deployment in 1963, the year after the disbanding of the Skyblazers (see below). The team switched to the F-105 Thunderchief for the 1964 season, but were forced to re-equip with the F-100D after only six airshows due to a catastrophic structural failure of the No. 2 aircraft during a pitch-up maneuver that resulted in the death of Capt Gene Devlin at Hamilton Air Force Base on 9 May. The F-100D Super Sabre was retained through the 1968 season.

==== F-4 Phantom II era ====
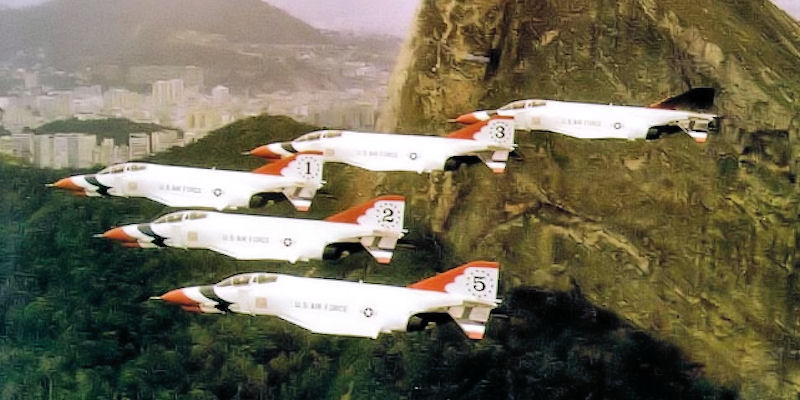
F-4Es, about 1972

By 1967, the Thunderbirds had flown 1,000 shows. In 1969, the squadron re-equipped with the front-line F-4E Phantom, which it flew until 1973, the only time the Thunderbirds would fly jets similar to those of the Navy's Blue Angels as it was the standard fighter for both services in the 1960s and 1970s.

==== T-38 Talon era ====
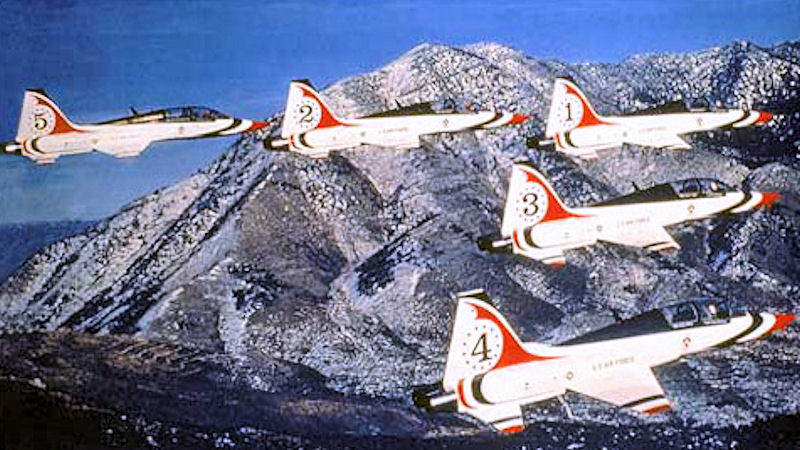
T-38 Talons, about 1980

The team flew only six air shows in 1973 and was grounded for some time. Due to the 1973 oil crisis, they switched to the more economical T-38 Talon for the 1974 season, as five T-38s used the same amount of fuel as one F-4 Phantom. The switch saw an alteration of the flight routine to exhibit the aircraft's maneuverability in tight turns, and ended the era of the black tail on the No. 4 slot plane, now regularly cleaned and shined like the others.

In 1982, the Thunderbirds suffered a catastrophic loss during pre-season training on 18 January. While practicing the four-plane diamond loop, the formation impacted the ground at high speed, instantly killing all four pilots: Major Norman L. Lowry (commander/leader), Captain Willie Mays, Captain Joseph N. "Pete" Peterson, and Captain Mark Melancon. The cause of the crash was determined by the USAF to be the result of a mechanical problem with the No. 1 aircraft's control stick actuator. This resulted in insufficient back pressure by the formation leader on the T-38 control stick during the loop. Visually cueing off the lead aircraft during formation maneuvering, the wing and slot pilots disregarded their positions relative to the ground. (Note: A five-page report of the mishap was published by Aviation Week & Space Technology in their issue dated 17 May 1982.)

==== F-16 Fighting Falcon era ====
The team's activities were suspended for six months pending investigation of the crashes and review of the program, then reinstituted using the General Dynamics F-16A Fighting Falcon in 1983 and upgraded to the F-16C (now produced by Lockheed Martin) in 1992.

In 1986, the Thunderbirds did a fly-by for the re-dedication of the Statue of Liberty in New York City. They also performed the first American military demonstration in a communist country when the team visited Beijing, China, in 1987.

Their 3,000th air show was performed in 1990, and in 1991 the team went overseas to perform air shows in Switzerland, Poland, and Hungary. The team traveled abroad again in 1996, visiting Romania, Bulgaria, and Slovenia. Also in 1996, the team participated in the Atlanta Olympics' opening ceremonies.

The United States Postal Service honored the Air Force's 50th anniversary as a separate branch of the military in 1997 with a limited edition stamp featuring the Thunderbirds.

In June 2005, the Thunderbirds selected Major Nicole Malachowski for the No. 3 position, making her the first female to hold a pilot position in the team's 53-year history. In 2007, during Maj. Malachowski's final season as a Thunderbird, the team selected its second female pilot, Captain Samantha Weeks, who flew the No. 6 opposing solo position.

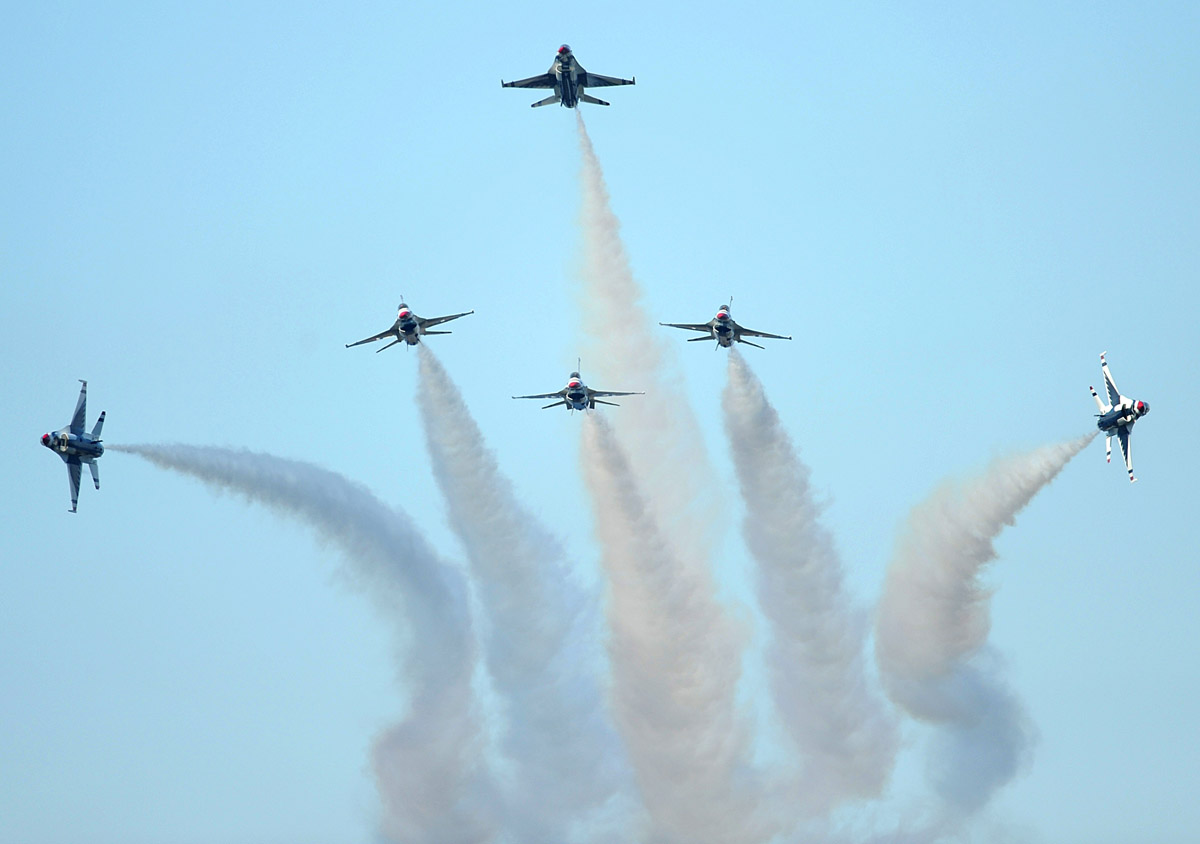
The Delta Burst

The 2007 European Goodwill Tour was the Thunderbirds' first visit to Europe after the 11 September attacks. During this tour, the Thunderbirds performed at their first-ever air show in Ireland. Despite inclement weather, more than 100,000 people attended the air show, garnering nationwide exposure by Irish media. Additional stops along the way included aerial demonstrations in Poland, Romania, Bulgaria's Graf Ignatievo Air Base, Italy, France and England, where the Thunderbirds participated in the Royal International Air Tattoo, the world's largest military air show. Outside of aerial demonstrations, the team participated in eight official public relations events attended by heads of state and local civic leaders. The team also conducted community outreach by meeting with needy children throughout Europe.

On 10–11 November 2007, the City of Las Vegas and Nellis AFB saluted the U.S. Air Force, hosting the capstone event of the USAF's 60th anniversary celebration.

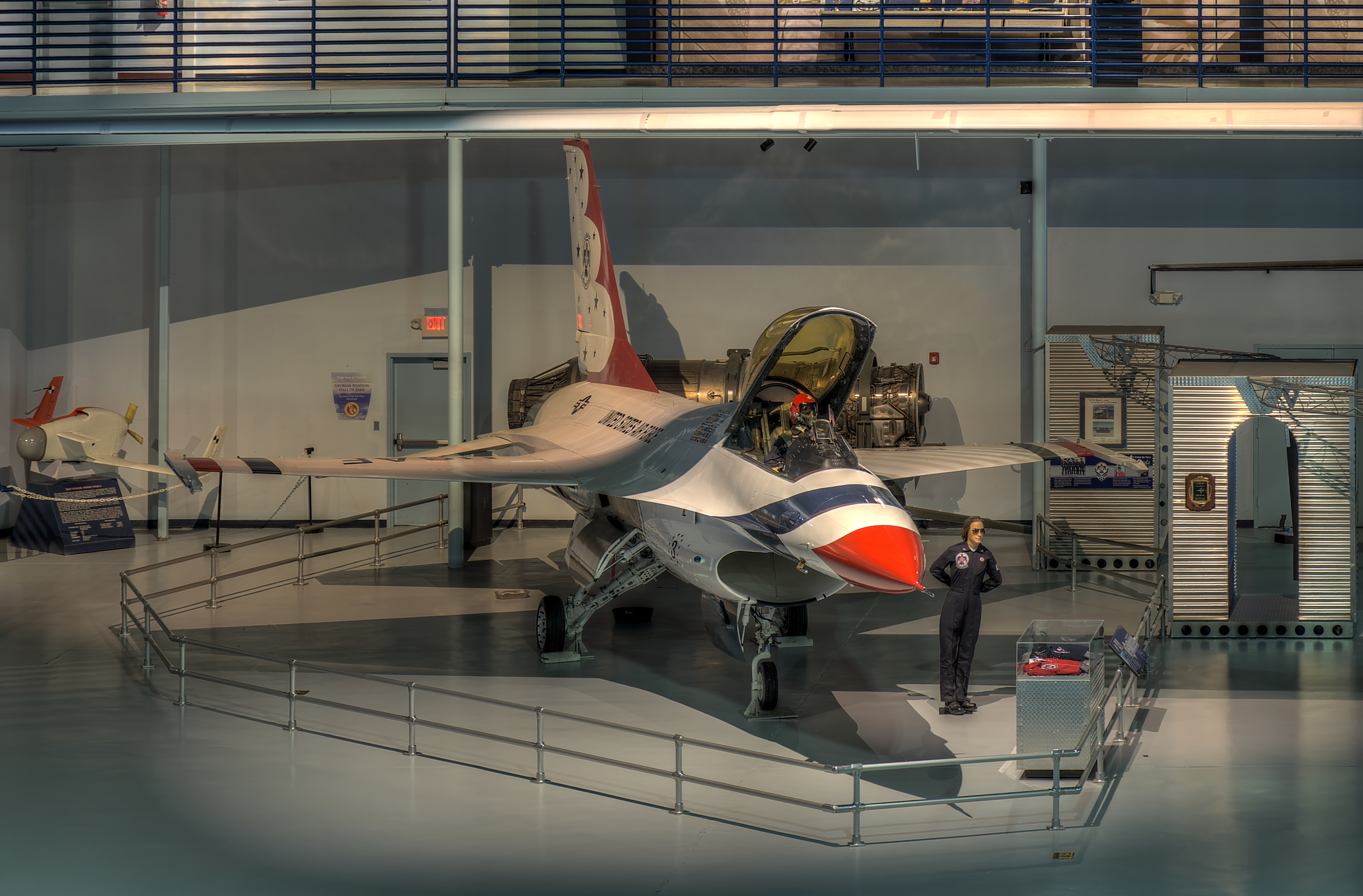
F-16A on display at the Museum of Aviation, Robins AFB. It was flown by the Thunderbirds between 1982 and 1992.

In 2008, the Thunderbirds remained in North America, performing both in the United States and in Canada. When Quebec City celebrated its 400th anniversary, the Thunderbirds joined the Canadian Armed Forces's Snowbirds, the British Royal Air Force's Red Arrows, and the United States Navy's Blue Angels in a ceremonial flight over Quebec City. Later in the year, the team returned to Canada for the Abbotsford International Airshow at Abbotsford International Airport, British Columbia.

In 2009 the Thunderbirds hired their first-ever Air National Guard pilot, Lt. Col. Derek Routt as Thunderbird No. 7 (operations officer), and the first-ever Air Force Reserve Command pilot, Maj. Sean Gustafson, also joined the team as Thunderbird No. 4 (slot).

The 2009 Far East Tour took the team to multiple locations on the western border of the Pacific Rim and included performances in Hawaii, Australia, Malaysia, Guam, Thailand, Japan and South Korea. More than 1.2 million people saw the shows in person and more than 120 million were exposed to the shows through their national media. These are conservative estimates as one Korean prime-time television show alone reached eight million. The top-rated show "Qualifications of Man" did a one-hour feature on the Thunderbirds and resulted from a coordinated media pitch to the network and the Republic of Korea Air Force. In addition to the air shows, the Thunderbirds personally met and spent time with more than five hundred special needs children and orphans.

The entire 2013 flying season was canceled due to budget cuts resulting from the United States fiscal cliff. Team members made recruiting appearances in the Las Vegas area that did not require travel. Enlisted personnel performed gate checks and base housing inspections. Performances resumed in 2014.

==== Historical demonstration aircraft ====
Republic F-84G Thunderjet
Employed by the Thunderbirds 1953–1954.
Republic F-84F Thunderstreak
The Air Force selected the swept-wing F-84F Thunderstreak as their second aircraft in 1955, modified for the team by adding smoke tanks, and red, white and blue drogue parachutes. Used from 1955 to 1956.
North American F-100C Super Sabre
With the change to the F-100 Super Sabre in 1956, the Thunderbirds became the world's first supersonic aerial demonstration team. That same year, the Thunderbirds moved to Nellis Air Force Base, Nevada, simplifying logistics and maintenance for the aircraft. The Thunderbirds used the C-model Super Sabre from 1956 to 1963.
Republic F-105B Thunderchief
Only six shows were flown in 1964 using the F-105 before safety concerns resulted in the team's adoption of the F-100D.
North American F-100D Super Sabre

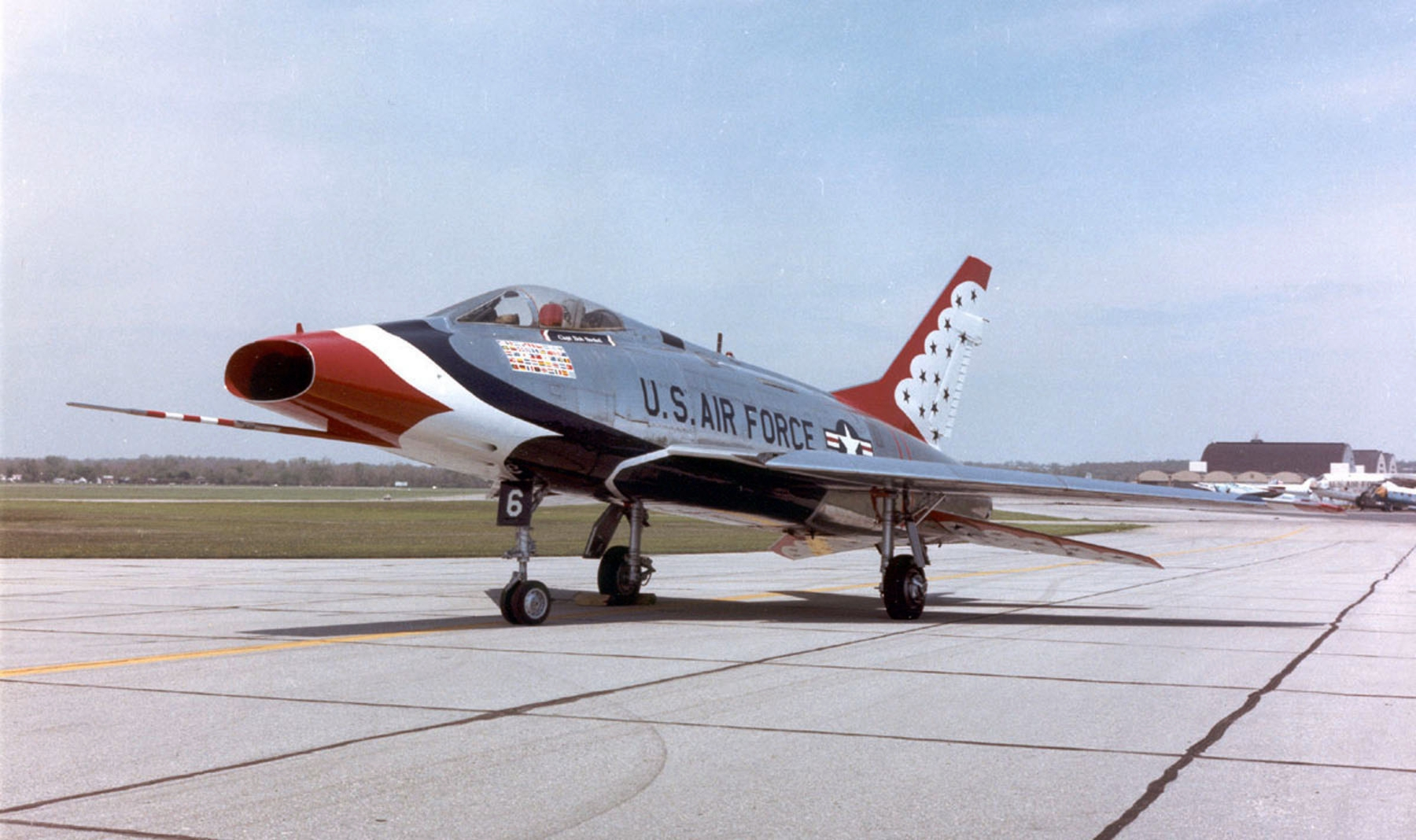
An F-100D on display at the National Museum of the United States Air Force

The D-model Super Sabres were used from 1964 to 1968.
McDonnell F-4E Phantom II
The 1969 conversion to the F-4 was the most extensive in the team's history. Among other modifications, paints that had worked on the F-100 appeared blotchy on the F-4 because of multicolored alloys used to resist heat and friction at Mach 2 speeds. A polyurethane paint base was developed to resolve the problem. The white paint base remains a part of today's Thunderbird aircraft. A popular myth is, given the exhaust emissions of the F-4's engines, the vertical stabilizer of the No. 4 slot aircraft was painted flat black. However, this is false; the vertical stabilizer of the No. 4 slot aircraft was allowed to be blackened by jet exhaust starting in 1960. Phantoms were used from 1969 to 1973.
Northrop T-38 Talon
The fuel crisis of the early 1970s resulted in the selection of the Northrop T-38A Talon, a supersonic trainer. Five T-38s used the same amount of fuel needed for one F-4 Phantom, and fewer people and equipment were required to maintain the aircraft. Although it met the criteria of demonstrating the capabilities of a prominent USAF aircraft, the Talon failed to fulfill the Thunderbird tradition of flying front-line jet fighters. The team flew the Talon from 1974 to 1981.

==== Accidents ====
In total, twenty-one Thunderbirds pilots have been killed in the team's history. Only three fatal crashes have occurred during air shows, two of them in jets:

The first was the death of Major Joe Howard, flying Thunderbird No. 3 (F-4E s/n 66-0321) on 4 June 1972 at Dulles Airport, during Transpo 72. His Phantom experienced a structural failure of the horizontal stabilizer, and Major Howard ejected as the aircraft fell back to earth tail first from about 1,500 feet and descended under a good canopy, but he landed in the aircraft fireball and did not survive.

The second death occurred 9 May 1981 at Hill AFB, Utah, when Captain David "Nick" Hauck flying Thunderbird No. 6 (T-38A) crashed while performing the hi-lo Maneuver. Capt Hauck crashed while attempting to land his ailing T-38 after an engine malfunctioned and caught fire. With black smoke billowing from the exhaust and the aircraft losing altitude in a high nose-up attitude, the safety officer on the ground radioed Capt Hauck: "You're on fire, punch out!" To that, he responded: "Hang on ... we have a bunch of people down there". The aircraft continued to stay airborne for about half a mile before hitting a large oak tree and a barn, then sliding across a field and flipping as it traversed an irrigation canal—ultimately erupting into a fireball just a few hundred feet from the runway's end. No one on the ground was injured, even though the accident occurred adjacent to a roadway packed with onlookers.

===== Air shows =====
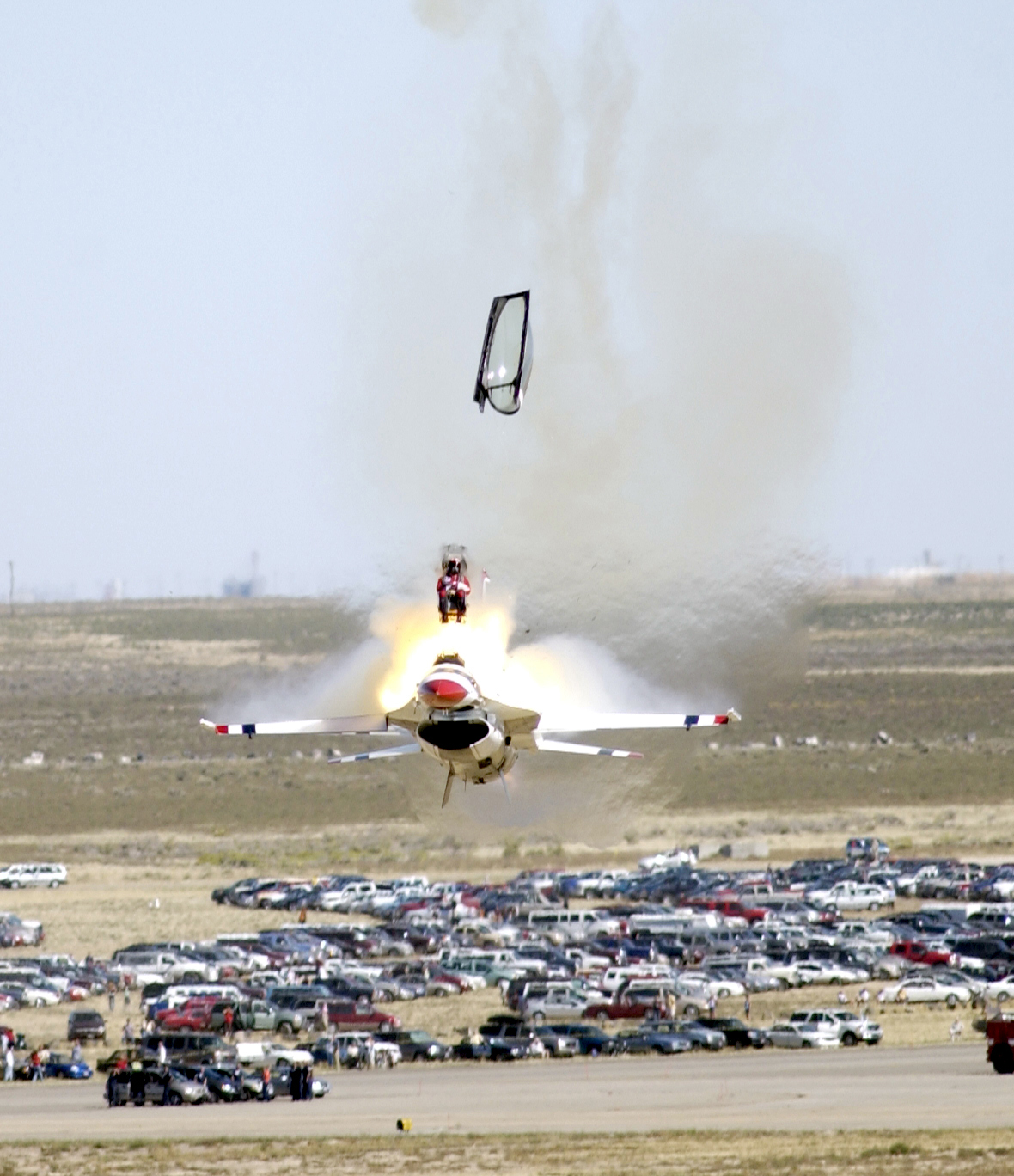
Captain Chris Stricklin ejects from his F-16 at the Mountain Home AFB airshow on 14 September 2003.

- 24 September 1961: TSgt John Lesso of the Thunderbirds C-123 crew was killed when a USAF C-123 carrying the Army Golden Knights, on which he was flight engineer, crashed during takeoff at an airshow in Wilmington, North Carolina.
- 4 June 1972: Major Joe Howard, flying Thunderbird No. 3 (F-4 s/n 66-0321), was killed during the Transpo '72 airshow at Dulles International Airport in northern Virginia.
- 9 May 1981: Capt Nick Hauck was killed in the crash of Thunderbird No. 6 (Northrop T-38) during a low approach during an air show at Hill Air Force Base, near Ogden, Utah.
- 14 September 2003: Captain Chris Stricklin, flying Thunderbird No. 6 (F-16), crashed during an airshow at Mountain Home AFB, Idaho. Immediately after takeoff, Stricklin attempted a "Split S" maneuver (which he had successfully performed over 200 times) based on an incorrect mean sea level (MSL) elevation of the airfield, 1,100 ft (340 m) higher than the home base at Nellis AFB. Climbing to only 1,670 ft (510 m) above ground level instead of 2,500 ft (760 m), Stricklin had insufficient altitude to complete the maneuver, but guided the F-16C aircraft down the runway away from the spectators and ejected less than one second before impact. He survived with only minor injuries and no one on the ground was injured, but the $20 million aircraft was completely destroyed. Official procedure for demonstration "split S" maneuvers was changed, and the USAF now requires Thunderbird pilots and airshow ground controllers to both work in above-MSL altitudes, as opposed to ground control working in AGL (above-ground-level) and pilots in MSL, which led to two sets of numbers that had to be reconciled by the pilot. Thunderbird pilots now also climb an extra 1,000 ft (300 m) before performing the Split S maneuver.
- 20 August 2005: The Thunderbirds temporarily grounded themselves pending an investigation into a minor mid-air incident during the Chicago Air & Water Show. During the diamond pass in review, the tip of the missile rail on the right wing of the slot (#4) aircraft contacted the left stabilator of the right (#3) aircraft. A four-foot section of the missile rail snapped off, while the No. 3 aircraft sustained damage described by one of the Thunderbirds pilots as a "medium deep scratch" to the red paint of the stabilator. This is why the USAF Thunderbirds have taken extra precaution when flying their diamond, changing from about one and a half feet wingtip to canopy separation to around three feet. Amateur video showed the missile rail falling into the "safety box" on Lake Michigan away from boaters. While there were no injuries and the aircraft remained flight worthy, the demonstration was immediately terminated, all aircraft returned to Gary International Airport, and the Thunderbirds did not perform on the second day of the Chicago show. The right wing pilot (#3) was Major D. Chris Callahan, and the slot position (#4) was flown by Major Steve Horton.
- 2 June 2016: Major Alex Turner, flying Thunderbird No. 6, crashed in a field near Colorado Springs, Colorado after performing a flyover at the United States Air Force Academy graduation ceremony. The F-16 pilot ejected and was unhurt. Investigation revealed that the aircraft's engine was inadvertently shut down at the start of landing procedures when a faulty throttle trigger permitted the throttle to be rotated into an engine cut-off position. In a strange twist later that day, the Thunderbirds' Naval counterparts in the Blue Angels suffered a fatal crash of their own.
- 23 June 2017: Capt. Erik Gonsalves was injured when, during landing, Thunderbird No. 8 ran off the runway and overturned prior to the Vectren Dayton Air Show. The pilot and a passenger, Technical Sgt. Kenneth Cordova, were trapped in the aircraft for over an hour. Cordova was uninjured. The investigation revealed excessive air speed coupled with landing too far down a wet runway caused the jet to leave the airstrip and flip over. Rain on the canopy windscreen and failure to follow proper braking procedures during the landing contributed to the accident.

===== Other fatalities =====
- 11 December 1954: Capt George Kevil was killed during solo training at Luke in an F-84G.
- 26 September 1957: 1st Lt Bob Rutte was killed in solo training at Nellis.
- 9 October 1958: Nineteen men aboard the Thunderbirds' support C-123 with a crew of 21 were killed in a crash about fifty miles (80 km) northwest of Boise, Idaho, while en route to McChord AFB, Washington, reportedly when the transport struck a flock of geese. Only two men survived.
- 12 March 1959: Capt C. D. "Fish" Salmon, slot pilot, was killed after a collision during formation training near Nellis.
- 27 July 1960: Capt J.R. Crane, advance pilot and narrator for the team, was killed during a solo proficiency flight at Nellis.
- 6 April 1961: Maj Robert S. Fitzgerald, commander of the team, and Capt George Nial, advance pilot and narrator, were killed during a training flight at Nellis.
- 9 May 1964: Capt Eugene J. "Gene" Devlin was killed when his Republic F-105B broke apart as it pitched up for landing from a three-plane formation pass over Hamilton AFB, California.
- 12 October 1966: Maj Frank Liethen and Capt Robert Morgan were killed in a collision of two F-100s during opposing Cuban eights, their F-100F crashing, at Indian Springs Air Force Auxiliary Field in Nevada. The other, an F-100D, managed to land at Nellis AFB, despite wing damage.
- 9 January 1969: Capt Jack Thurman was killed after a mid-air collision in training north of Nellis; the other F-100D returned safely.
- 21 December 1972: Capt Jerry Bolt and TSgt Charles Lynn were killed during a flight test at Nellis.
- 25 July 1977: Capt Charlie Carter, Thunderbird pilot and narrator, was fatally injured after an aborted landing attempt in Cheyenne, Wyoming, and crashed into the Frontier Days rodeo arena.
- 8 September 1981: Lt Col David L. Smith, commander of the Thunderbirds, was killed when his aircraft ingested seagulls while taking off from Cleveland, Ohio. His T-38 crashed into Lake Erie, and although Smith ejected from the airplane, his ejection seat malfunctioned and did not deploy his parachute (his crew chief successfully ejected from the rear cockpit).
- 18 January 1982: The "Diamond Crash", the worst training crash in Thunderbird history, occurred when Maj Norman L. Lowry, Capt Willie Mays, Capt Joseph N. Peterson, and Capt Mark Melancon were killed while practicing a diamond loop during training at Indian Springs Air Force Auxiliary Field in T-38s. Only two Thunderbird pilots survived. Both Thunderbird Numbers 5 and 6, the solo pilots.
- 4 April 2018: Maj Stephen Del Bagno, slot pilot, was killed when his aircraft, Thunderbird No. 4, crashed over the Nevada Test and Training Range, during a routine aerial demonstration training flight.

==== Relationship to other USAF aerial demonstration teams ====
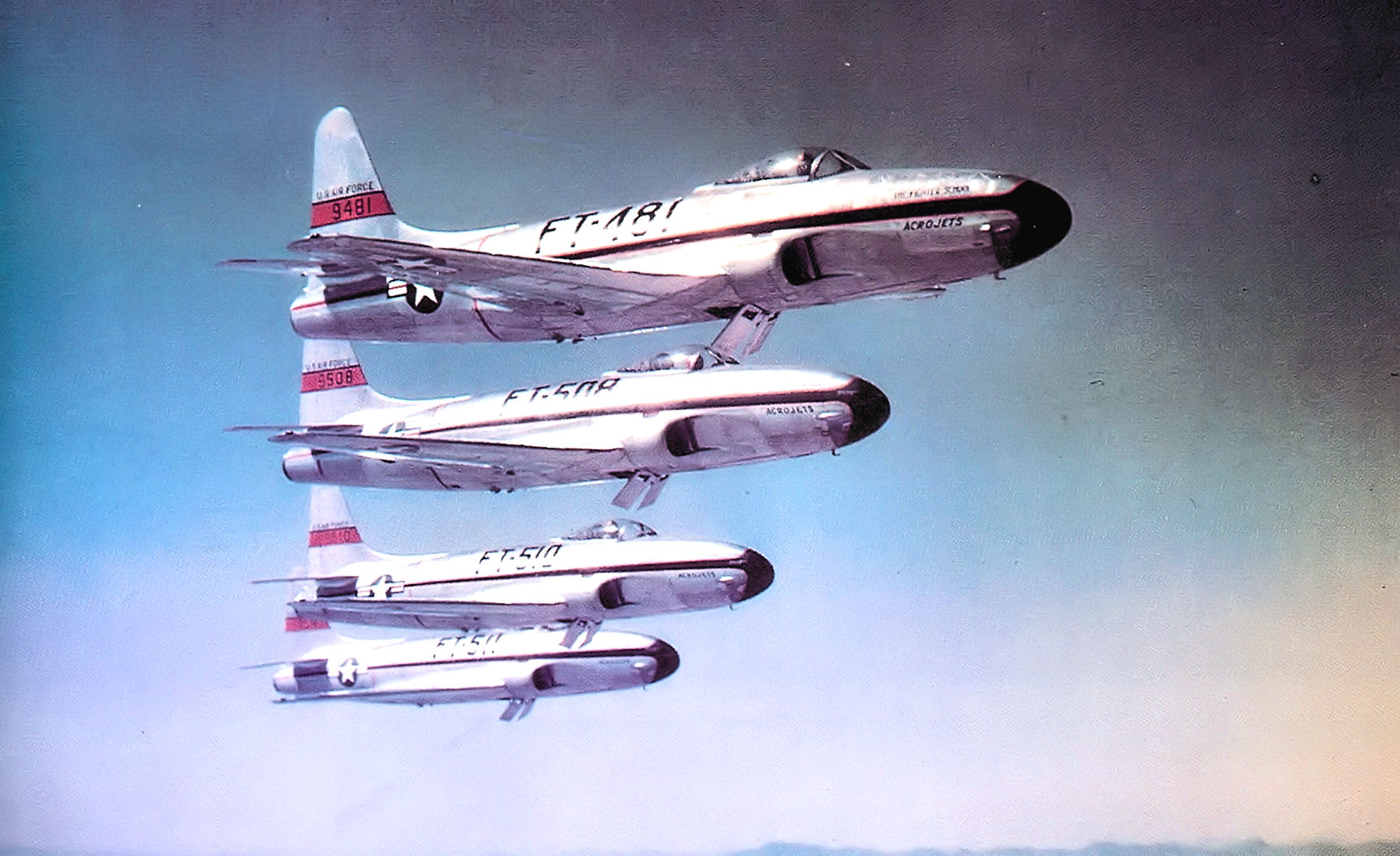
1950 photo of USAF Fighter School Acrojets demonstration team. Identified aircraft are Lockheed F-80C-10-LO Shooting Stars, 49-481, 49-508, 49-510, 49-511. 49-481 had been assigned to the 1st Fighter Group. The remainder were among the handful of F-80C-10s that did not see service in the Korean War.

The first USAF jet-powered aerobatic demo team was the "Acrojets", performing early in 1949 with F-80Cs at the USAF Fighter School at Williams Air Force Base, Arizona, and was headed by Captain Howard W. "Swede" Jensen. This team flew together until August 1950, when it was inactivated due to the American commitment to the Korean War. Additionally, there was also a later USAFE "Acrojets" team in West Germany, this one made up of USAF T-33 Shooting Star instructor pilots at Fürstenfeldbruck AB in the mid-1950s.

The "Skyblazers" were the USAF demonstration team representing the United States Air Forces Europe (USAFE) from the late 1940s through the 1950s. This team was formed in early 1949 by a group of 22d Fighter Squadron pilots from the 36th Fighter Wing at Fürstenfeldbruck AB in West Germany. At this time they were flying Lockheed F-80B Shooting Stars. The unit transitioned to the F-84E in 1950, the F-86F in 1955 and the F-100C in 1956. Two of the original Skyblazer team members, identical twins C.A. "Bill" and C.C. "Buck" Pattillo, went on to become members of the first Thunderbird team.

Unlike the Thunderbirds, the Skyblazers seldom appeared outside of the realm of USAFE operations in Europe. The Skyblazers were disbanded in January 1962 when their home squadron was rotated back to the United States and their assigned aircraft transitioned to the F-105 Thunderchief.

The "Four Horsemen of the Apocalypse" were a group of four C-130 Hercules transport pilots and their planes who were officially recognized as an aerial demonstration team by the USAF's Tactical Air Command in 1957. They flew as an aerial demonstration team until 1960.

==== Thunderbirds museum ====
The USAF maintains a Thunderbirds Museum covering the history of the demonstration team. The museum is located at Nellis Air Force Base and includes a full size F-16 gate guard on display (in full Thunderbird paint scheme).

=== Decorations ===
- Decorations

Air Force Outstanding Unit Award

25 Feb 1967 – 31 Dec 1968; 1 Jan – 31 Dec 1973; 1 Jan – 31 Dec 1974; 1 Jan 1979 – 31 Dec 1980; 1 Jun 1995 – 31 May 1997; 1 Jun 2001 – 31 May 2003; 1 Jun 2004 – 31 May 2006

Air Force Organizational Excellence Award

1 Jan 1984 – 31 Dec 1985; 1 Jan 1986 – 31 Dec 1987; 30 Sep 1989 – 30 Sep 1991; 1 Jun 1997 – 31 May 1998

=== Lineage ===
- Organized as: 3600th Air Demonstration Team, 25 May 1953
  Inactivated on 23 June 1956
- Organized as: 3595th Air Demonstration Flight, 19 November 1956
  Re-designated: 4520th Air Demonstration Flight, 1 July 1958
  Re-designated: 4520th Air Demonstration Squadron, 1 January 1961
  Discontinued on 25 February 1967
- Constituted as: USAF Air Demonstration Squadron, and activated 13 February 1967
- Organized on 25 February 1967
- Consolidated on 19 September 1985 with 30th Bombardment Squadron (Heavy), first organized on 13 June 1917

=== Assignments ===
4520th Air Demonstration Squadron

- 3600th Fighter Training Wing, 25 May 1953 – 23 June 1956
- USAF Advanced Fighter School, 19 November 1956 – 25 February 1967

USAF Air Demonstration Squadron

- Tactical Air Command, 13 February 1967
- USAF Tactical Fighter Weapons Center, 25 February 1967
- 57th Fighter Weapons (later, 57th Tactical Training; 57th Fighter Weapons; 57th Fighter; 57th) Wing, 15 February 1974 – present

=== Stations ===
4520th Air Demonstration Squadron

- Luke AFB, Arizona, 1 November 1952 – 23 June 1956
- Nellis AFB, Nevada, 19 November 1956 – 25 February 1967

USAF Air Demonstration Squadron

- Nellis AFB, Nevada, 25 February 1967 – present

=== Aircraft ===
4520th Air Demonstration Squadron

- Republic F-84G Thunderjet, 1953
- Republic F-84F Thunderstreak, 1954–1955
- North American F-100 Super Sabre, 1956–1963
- Republic F-105 Thunderchief, 1964
- North American F-100 Super Sabre, 1964–1966

USAF Air Demonstration Squadron

- North American F-100 Super Sabre, 1967–1968
- McDonnell Douglas F-4 Phantom II, 1969–1973
- Northrop T-38 Talon, 1974–1982
- General Dynamics F-16 Fighting Falcon, 1983–present.

== Notable members ==
Below are some of the more notable members of the Thunderbirds:

- Sam Johnson, American politician and military pilot
- Nicole Malachowski, American aviator and first female pilot for the Thunderbirds
- Merrill McPeak, Air Force General and pilot
- E. Daniel Cherry, Air Force General and pilot

== See also ==
- U.S. Navy Blue Angels
