= 1982 Thunderbirds Indian Springs diamond crash =

U.S. Air Force Demonstration Team accident

Coordinates: 36.5884°N 115.680°W

1982 Thunderbirds Indian Springs Diamond Crash
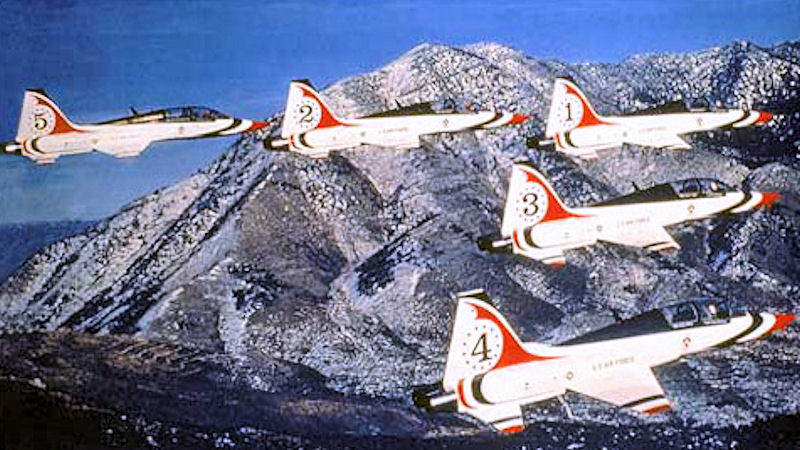
- Thunderbird T-38As in formation

Accident
- Date: 18 January 1982
- Summary: Crashed into terrain due to jammed stabilizer on lead aircraft
- Site: Indian Springs Air Force Auxiliary Field

Aircraft
- Aircraft type: Four Northrop T-38 Talons
- Operator: United States Air Force Thunderbirds
- Flight origin: Nellis AFB, Nevada
- Crew: 4
- Fatalities: 4
- Survivors: 0

The 1982 Diamond Crash was the worst operational accident to befall the U.S. Air Force Thunderbirds Air Demonstration Team involving show aircraft. Four Northrop T-38 Talon jets crashed during operational training on 18 January 1982, killing all four pilots.

== Accident ==
The Thunderbirds were practicing at Indian Springs Air Force Auxiliary Field, Nevada (now Creech Air Force Base) for a performance at Davis–Monthan AFB, Arizona. Four T-38As, Numbers 1–4, comprising the basic diamond formation, hit the desert floor almost simultaneously on Range 65, now referred to as "The Gathering of Eagles Range". The pilots were practicing the four-plane line abreast loop, in which the aircraft climb in side-by-side formation several thousand feet, pull over in a slow, inside loop, and descend at more than 400 miles per hour (640 km/h). The planes were meant to level off at about 100 feet (30 m); instead, the formation struck the ground at high speed.

The four pilots died instantly: Major Norm Lowry, III, leader, 37, of Radford, Virginia; Captain Willie Mays, left wing, 31, of Ripley, Tennessee; Captain Joseph "Pete" Peterson, right wing, 32, of Tuskegee, Alabama; and Captain Mark E. Melancon, slot, 31, of Dallas, Texas. The airframes involved were all T-38A-75-NO Talons, serial numbers 68-8156, -8175, -8176 and -8184.

Col. Mike Wallace, of the Public Information Office at nearby Nellis AFB, home of the demonstration team, said that Major General Gerald D. Larson, the head of an Air Force investigation board, arrived at Nellis that night. "Larson and a team of 10 to 15 experts are expected to spend three weeks studying the wreckage of the four T-38s – the worst [training] crash in the 28-year history of the Air Force aerial demonstration team. The jets crashed almost simultaneously with what near-by Indian Springs residents described as an earthquake-like explosion that looked like a napalm bomb. Wreckage was strewn across a 1-square-mile area of the desert 60 miles (97 kilometres) north of Las Vegas."

Initial speculation was that the accident might have been due to pilot error, that the leader might have misjudged his altitude or speed and the other three pilots repeated the error. However, the Air Force concluded that the crash was due to a jammed stabilizer on the lead jet. The other pilots, in accordance with their training, did not break formation.

== Eyewitness accounts ==
"At the speed they were going when they came out of the loop, I just thought, "That's the end of that for them fellows,'" said W. G. Wood of Indian Springs, who witnessed the crash as he drove along US 95. "It happened so fast I couldn't tell you if one hit sooner. It looked like all of them hit at the same time."

Construction worker George LaPointe watched the jets disappear behind tree tops, "They didn't come back up," he said. "They were going full tilt, really screaming, and at the time I thought they were too low."

== Investigation and aftermath ==
Technical Sergeant Alfred R. King filmed the accident from the ground. His footage helped to determine the cause for the AFR 127-4 (the Air Force Regulation covering "Investigating and Reporting US Air Force Mishaps") accident investigation. On 26 January 1982, Congress passed Resolution 248, stating that "The Congress hereby affirms its strong support for continuation of the Thunderbirds program." Nonetheless, the 1982 season was cancelled for the Thunderbirds while they rebuilt the team. Former demonstration-unit members still on active duty were recalled to help rebuild the squadron.

A five-page report of the mishap was published by Aviation Week & Space Technology in their issue dated 17 May 1982.

The Thunderbirds next flew a public demonstration in early 1983, more than 18 months after their last public air show.

On 2 April 1984, at the direction of Gen. Wilbur Creech, Commanding General, USAF Tactical Air Command, the two authorized and only known copies of the crash videotape were destroyed, with Creech himself erasing the portion of the master tape that showed the final impact and subsequent fireball of the four aircraft. At the time of the destruction, the families of the pilots and NBC had already demanded access to the tapes as part of a suit against Northrop and a FOIA request, respectively. Creech did not seek JAG guidance prior to destroying the tapes, and asked two of the three personnel who had been involved in reviewing the tapes to leave the room prior to his partial erasure of the master tape. He stated that he erased the tape because it would likely be used for sensationalism purposes and he was concerned about the privacy of the victims' families.

== Conversion to the F-16A ==
The Thunderbirds switched back to front-line jet fighters after the accident. The Air Force team, like the U.S. Navy's Blue Angels, had switched to smaller aircraft after the 1973 oil crisis (the Navy switched from F-4 Phantoms to smaller A-4 Skyhawks). The first F-16A Fighting Falcon in Thunderbird colors arrived at Nellis AFB, Nevada, on 22 June 1982.
