= Carlone =

Carlone is a surname. Notable people with the surname include:

- Alessio Carlone (born 1996), Belgian football player
- Andrea Carlone (1626–1697), Italian painter
- Carlo Carlone (1686–1775), Italian painter and engraver
- Diego Francesco Carlone (1674–1750), Italian sculptor
- Francis Nunzio Carlone or Frankie Carle (1903–2001), American pianist and bandleader
- Giovanni Battista Carlone (1603–1684), Italian painter
- Giovanni Bernardo Carlone (1590–1630), Italian painter
- Pietro Francesco Carlone (before 1607–1681/82), Austrian architect
- Taddeo Carlone (died 1613), Swiss-Italian sculptor and architect
- Carlo Martino Carlone (1616–1667), Italian architect
- Paul Anthony Carlone (born 1990), American meteorologist and businessman

== See also ==
- Carlon
