= Zoe G. Cardon =

American ecosystems ecologist

- Born: Logan, Utah
- Education: B.S. Utah State University; Ph.D. Stanford University; Postdoctoral fellow at UC Berkeley
- Scientific career
- Fields: Ecosystems ecology; plant physiology; microbiology
- Institutions: MBL, Woods Hole, MA; Brown University; University of Connecticut; Bowdoin College

Zoe G. Cardon is an American ecosystems ecologist whose research focused on plant-soil interaction in the rhizosphere. She is a senior scientist at the Marine Biological Laboratory's Ecosystems Center and an adjunct professor of ecology and evolutionary biology at Brown University. Her work integrates stable isotopes techniques and mathematical modeling to study belowground ecological processes. Cardon has also participated in federal science policy initiatives, including efforts associated with the National Microbiome Initiative.

== Early life and education ==
Cardon was born in Logan, Utah to parents Guy Cardon and Joyce Johnson Cardon, owners of the Bluebird Restaurant and Candy Co. She grew up playing the piano, performing as a soloist in the Utah Symphony and the USU Orchestra. She has also won four piano competitions at the Utah State Fair, and has published poetry. She was named a Presidential Scholar from Utah in 1983. In 1988, she graduated with a B.S in Biology and a B.A in Spanish from Utah State University as valedictorian in the College of Science and Scholar of the Year in the university's Robins Awards. She went on to receive her Ph.D in Biological Sciences at Stanford University in 1994. She completed her education by conducting research as a DOE Global Change Distinguished Postdoctoral Fellow at the University of California, Berkeley.

== Career and research ==
Cardon began as an assistant professor at Bowdoin College for a year (1996–1997) before moving to the University of Connecticut (UConn), where she received an Outstanding Advisor Award for her enthusiasm and accessibility as an advisor and assistant professor. One of her advisees, Andy Czaja, said of Cardon, "Zoe is always willing to help, no matter what she's doing. A lot of times, she'll offer help even without asking. She sends e-mail, saying 'I was thinking about your project, what about this?'" She worked at UConn until 2007, eventually becoming head of the Biology Honors Program, and associate director and Graduate Program Director of the Center for Integrative Geosciences. In 2002, Cardon was awarded the Sarah and Daniel Hrdy Visiting Fellowship in Conservation Biology at Harvard University, which is awarded to distinguished individuals who will work and study within the Department of Organismic and Evolutionary Biology. In 2007, Cardon assumed a position as Senior Scientist at the Ecosystems Center, Marine Biological Laboratory, in Woods Hole, MA. She is also an adjunct professor of Ecology and Evolutionary Biology at Brown University.

Cardon's research focuses largely on the rhizosphere and interactions between the micro- and macro-organisms within it. Her work draws from multiple disciplines and perspectives in order to understand how interactions among plant roots, microbes, and minerals facilitate exchanges of resources in these systems. In 2015 Cardon participated in a forum on "Microbiome Innovation: Roadmap to the Future" that was hosted by the White House Office of Science and Technology Policy.

== Publications ==
Cardon's research focuses largely on interactions within the rhizosphere and understanding the complex relationships between microbes, plants, and soils. Her research is highly influential and she has published in many peer-reviewed journals such as Proceedings of the National Academy of Sciences of the United States of America, Soil Biology and Biochemistry, Journal of Cell Science, Plant Physiology, and more. Listed below are a few of her most highly cited publications:

- Contrasting effects of elevated CO2 on old and new soil carbon pools. Soil Biology and Biochemistry, 2001
- Influence of rhizodeposition under elevated CO_{2} on plant nutrition and soil organic matter. Plant and Soil, 1995
- Sagebrush carrying out hydraulic lift enhances surface soil nitrogen cycling and nitrogen uptake into inflorescences. Proceedings of the National Academy of Sciences of the United States of America, 2013
- The green algal underground – evolutionary secrets of desert cells. Bioscience, 2008

== Awards and honors ==
In 2018 Cardon was named a fellow of Ecological Society of America. Cardon was elected a fellow of the American Association for the Advancement of Science in 2021.
