= Carlow (disambiguation) =

Carlow is a town in Ireland.

Carlow may also refer to:

== Ireland ==
- County Carlow
- Carlow (barony)

=== Parliament of Ireland (1800) ===
- Carlow (Parliament of Ireland constituency) (1613–1800)
- County Carlow (Parliament of Ireland constituency)

=== House of Commons of the United Kingdom (1801–1922) and First Dáil 1918 ===
- Carlow (UK Parliament constituency) (1801–1885)
- County Carlow (UK Parliament constituency) (1801–1922)

=== Dáil Éireann (1921–present) ===
- Carlow–Kilkenny (1921–1937, 1948– )
- Carlow–Kildare (1937–1948)

== Others ==
- Carlow, Germany
- Carlow, Missouri
- F.C. Carlow
- Carlow University

== See also ==
- Carlo (name)
- Carlon
