= Cartlidge =

Cartlidge is a surname. Notable people with the surname include:

- Arthur Cartlidge (1880–1922), English footballer
- David Cartlidge (born 1940), English footballer
- James Cartlidge (born 1974), English politician
- Katrin Cartlidge (1961–2002), English actress
  - Katrin Cartlidge Foundation
- Michelle Cartlidge, English writer and illustrator
- William P. Cartlidge (born 1942), English film producer

People with the surname Cartlich, an archaic and variant spelling of Cartlidge:

- Elizabeth Caslon née Cartlich (1730–1795), British typefounder
- John Cartlich, 19th century equestrian performer
- Serena Cartlich, fictional character from the 1932 film Big City Blues

== See also ==
- Cartledge
- Cartridge
- For members of the fictional 'Cartlege' family, see the Springhill TV series.
