= Paul Cartledge (music producer) =

English record producer

Paul Cartledge is an English record producer specializing in media based projects including advertising, television, film, radio and digital.

He grew up in the Punk scene in the North West of England, playing in various bands. He was taken under the wing of Tony Visconti, record producer to David Bowie among others, and became the studio manager of Visconti's 'Good Earth Studios' in London. There he worked with many rock and pop artists including The Moody Blues, Elaine Paige, Les Rita Mitsouko, The Alarm, Big Audio Dynamite, Paul Oakenfold & Steve Osbourne with Happy Mondays, Captain Sensible, The Jesus and Mary Chain, Hazel O'Connor, Bros, S'Express, Derek B, and Ed Buller.

He went on to work for Joe & Co, the music production company owned by Joe Campbell & Paul Hart. He became house engineer and worked with many artists including Pink Floyd, Robert Plant, Dusty Springfield, Jon Secada, Roy Wood, Carl Wayne, Stephanie Lawrence, Ralph McTell, Georgie Fame, Charles Aznavour, Chrissie Hynde, Dead or Alive; his highest profile engineering credits being on two records, produced by Phil Ramone, for Frank Sinatra. He pioneered ISDN recording techniques and used this in work on film soundtracks, including Steven Zaillian's Searching for Bobby Fischer and Henry Selick's James and the Giant Peach, produced by Tim Burton. Notable actors he has recorded include James Coburn, Sir Robert Stephens, Sir Ben Kingsley, Pete Postlethwaite, and David Thewlis.

At the beginning of the 21st century, Cartledge teamed up with Harrison Birtwistle protogé Philip Jewson, to compose and produce music for the British cult drama Urban Gothic, and has since worked with Jewson on an array of music for media projects. Together they own the Soho-based music production company 'Yellow Boat Music Limited'.

He has kept the connection with Visconti alive recording vocals on a duet "No Other God" between Placebo frontman Brian Molko And Kristeen Young, on the Visconti produced album X and is mentioned in his autobiography, Bolan, Bowie and the Boy from Brooklyn.

== Record credits ==
Year	Title	Artist	Label	Code	Credit
1988	Sur La Mer	The Moody Blues	Polygram	-	Assistant
1988	Marc & Robert	Les Rita Mitsouko	Virgin	30635	Assistant
1988	Tighten Up Vol.88	Big Audio Dynamite	CBS	461199 2	Assistant
1989	Nude	Dead Or Alive	Epic	46 50791	Engineer
1990	Cookin With Gas	NYJO	NYJO Records	NYJCD010	Producer/Engineer
1990	Electric Angels	Electric Angels	Atlantic	82064-2	Studio Manager
1990	Portraits	NYJO	Hothouse Records	HHCD1007	Producer/Engineer
1991	Remembrance	NYJO	NYJO Records	NYJCD011	Producer/Engineer
1992	Looking Forward - Looking Back	NYJO	NYJO Records	NYJCD012	Producer/Engineer
1993	A Merry Christmas	NYJO	NYJO Records	NYJCD014	Producer/Engineer
1993	A Merry Christmas	NYJO	NYJO Records	NYJCD014	Producer/Engineer
1994	Si Te Vas	Jon Secada	EMI	29683	Engineer
1994	Time Traveller	The Moody Blues	Polygram	-	Assistant Engineer
1994	Duets	Frank Sinatra	Capitol Records	-	Engineer
1994	Duets 2	Frank Sinatra	Capitol Records	-	Engineer
1995	Sarabande	Richard Durrant	Longman Records	1	Compilation (Digital Editing)
1996	Republica	Republica	BMG	74321 410522	Guitar on Track 2
1998	Down Behind The Abbey	The Cluskey Hopkins Jazz Show	DH Entertainment	DHCD002	Engineer
1998	Volume 1	Dave Chandlers Quintet	V.J.M. Records	LMJCD29	Engineer
1998	Volume 2	Dave Chandlers Quintet	V.J.M. Records	LMJCD30	Engineer
2000	La Guitarra Latina	Richard Durrant	Longman Records	030CD	Engineer
2005	A Scattering Of Snow	The Big Stone	Longman Records	043CD	writer/artist/producer
2005	Two Suites	NYJO	NYJO Records	NYJCD024	Producer/Engineer
2005	You and Me Against The World Baby	Priya Thomas	Boiling Point	-	Mix Engineer 3 tracks
2005	Uranus	Monkey Pants	Grammy	G0547076	Producer/Backing Vocals
