= Geoff Cartledge =

Australian rules footballer (1922–2001)

Personal information
- Full name: Geoffrey Edwin Cartledge
- Born: 17 August 1922; Malvern, Victoria, Australia
- Died: 4 December 2001 (aged 79)
- Original team: South Camberwell
- Height: 173 cm (5 ft 8 in)
- Weight: 76 kg (168 lb)

Playing career^{1}
| Years | Club | Games (Goals) |
| 1946–47 | Hawthorn | 7 (0) |
- ^{1} Playing statistics correct to the end of 1947.

Geoffrey Edwin Cartledge (17 August 1922 – 4 December 2001) was an Australian rules footballer who played with Hawthorn in the Victorian Football League (VFL).

== Personal life ==
Cartledge enlisted in the Australian Army on 23 July 1942, one-and-a-half years after the outbreak of the Second World War. He was discharged as a trooper on 12 July 1946.
