= WSO2 Carbon =

WSO2 Carbon is the core platform on which WSO2 middleware products are built. It is based on Java OSGi technology, which allows components to be dynamically installed, started, stopped, updated, and uninstalled, and it eliminates component version conflicts. In Carbon, this capability translates into a solid core of common middleware enterprise components, including clustering, security, logging, and monitoring, plus the ability to add components for specific features needed to solve a specific enterprise scenario.

WSO2 Carbon was introduced in 2009 and received InfoWorld's 2009 'Best of Open Source Software', or "Bossie", award.

In February 2009, WSO2 introduced the WSO2 Carbon componentized framework based on the Open Source Gateway Initiative (OSGi), designed to serve as the basis for all WSO2 software products. Version 5.3.0 of the open-source WSO2 Carbon Kernel was released in December 2022 and updated in January 2023.
