= CarDon & Associates =

- Company type: Private
- Industry: Senior living
- Founded: 1977
- Founder: Carroll Moore; Donna Moore
- Headquarters: Bloomington, Indiana, U.S. Fishers, Indiana, U.S.
- Area served: Southern and central Indiana
- Key people: Stephen Moore (CEO)
- Revenue: U.S. $170 million (2013)
- Owners: Kathy Headley; David Moore; Dan Moore; Stephen Moore
- Number of employees: 3,000 (2013)
- Website: www.cardon.us

CarDon & Associates owns and operates senior housing and rehabilitation communities in central and southern Indiana. It is one of the largest such companies in the state, with 19 senior housing communities and rehab facilities. It is family-owned with main offices in Bloomington and Fishers. The company has annual revenues of $170 million as of 2013.

== History ==
The company was founded in 1977 by Carroll and Donna Moore with the opening of a senior community in Franklin, Indiana. The company continued to expand over the years, either by building new facilities or acquiring them from other companies. All six of the founders’ children worked at the Greenwood center while growing up, four of whom continue to be active in running the company today.

Carroll and Donna Moore turned over operations to their children in 2000. Dr. Stephen Moore, a licensed physician, currently holds the titles of Chief Executive Officer and President, and three of his siblings join him on the board of directors.

== Facilities ==
CarDon operates senior communities in the following Indiana counties: Brown, Dubois, Greene, Hamilton, Hendricks, Johnson, Madison, Marion, Monroe, Orange and Vanderburgh. CarDon offers a variety of living environments including assisted living, memory care, independent living, skilled nursing, long-term care and rehabilitation. Two more senior communities are set to open in 2015.
