= Gwendolyn Cartledge =

American educationist

Gwendolyn Cartledge (born 1943) is professor in the School of Physical Activity and Educational Services at the Ohio State University (Cartledge, 2009), specializing in methods for teaching social skills to children with and without disabilities ). Her primary responsibilities include teacher education for students with mild disabilities on. Her research and writings are recognized and cited nationally in teacher preparation programs. She has written several books and articles on these topics.

== Education ==
Cartledge received her B.S. in elementary education and a M.Ed. in special education from the University of Pittsburgh in 1965 and 1973 respectively. She earned a Ph.D. in Special Education/Curriculum and Supervision from The Ohio State University in 1975 (Cartledge, 2009).

== Early work ==
She began work as a teacher in the West Mifflin School District in West Mifflin, PA. She taught students with learning and behavior disorders in the Pittsburgh Public Schools and then moved into a supervisory position there. Upon receiving her Ph.D., she accepted the job as faculty member at Cleveland State University. At Cleveland State, she taught classes on teaching students with mild disabilities and consulted with various agencies on developing curriculum.

== Career ==
Along with her colleague James Kleefeld, she published curricula centered on developing social skills in children with learning and behavior disabilities. Working Together: Building Children’s Social Skills through Folk Literature (1994; in press) incorporates the use of folktales as a primary teaching method. The folktales given are stories from a wide variety of cultures that promote healthy social development” (Cartledge & Kleefeld, 1994; in press). The target age for this particular curriculum is Grades 3-6.

Taking Part: Introducing Social Skills to Children (Cartledge & Kleefeld, 1991; 2009) uses interactive lessons to teach younger children from preschool to Grade 3 prosocial behaviors in a more concrete, simplified way. The original curricula published by American Guidance Company included a teaching manual, audiotapes, posters, puppets, stickers, and the like, the revised curriculum published by Research Press gives many of these items as blackline masters.

Her focus on the development of social skills in children with learning and behavior disabilities has shifted its focus to inner city schools. Her latest book, co-written by Ralph Garner III, and Donna Y. Ford, Diverse Learners with Exceptionalities: Culturally Responsive Teaching in the Inclusive Classroom focuses on classroom and behavior management strategies and successful intervention for culturally and racially diverse children with special educational needs (Cartledge, Gardner, & Ford, 2009).

== Awards ==
Cartledge has received several awards for her contributions, with her latest award coming in 2006 as The Educator of the Year Award from the Ohio State Council for Exceptional Children (Cartledge, 2009). She presented Ohio State University Distinguished Teaching Award in 2003 (Cartledge, 2009).

== Publications ==
- Diverse learners with exceptionalities: Culturally responsive Teaching in the Inclusive Classroom (Cartledge, Gardner, & Ford, 2009)
- Teaching urban learners: Culturally responsive strategies for developing academic and behavioral competence (Cartledge, & Lo, 2006)
- Cultural diversity and social skill instruction: Understanding ethnic and gender differences (Cartledge, & Milburn, 1996)
- Teaching social skills to children and youth: Innovative approaches (3rd Ed.) (Cartledge, & Milburn, 1995).
- The case for teaching social skills in the classroom (Cartledge & Milburn, 1978)
- Practical behavior management techniques to close the accessibility gap for students who are culturally and linguistically diverse (Cartledge, Singh, & Gibson, 2008),
- Culturally responsive classrooms for culturally diverse students with and at risk for disabilities (Cartledge, & Kourea, 2008)
- Early intervention in the urban classroom: Using culturally responsive practices (Musti-Rao, & Cartledge, 2007).
