= Mark Carlon =

Australian rules footballer

Personal information
- Full name: Mark Francis Carlon
- Born: 18 October 1953 (age 73)
- Original team: Claremont
- Height: 185 cm (6 ft 1 in)
- Weight: 83 kg (183 lb)

Playing career^{1}
Years	Club	Games (Goals)
1973-1976, 1978-1980	Claremont	103 (18)
1977	St Kilda	6 (1)
- ^{1} Playing statistics correct to the end of 1980.

Mark Francis Carlon (born 18 October 1953) is a former Australian rules footballer who played with Claremont in the West Australian Football League and St. Kilda in the Victorian Football League (VFL).
