= Elizabeth Caslon =

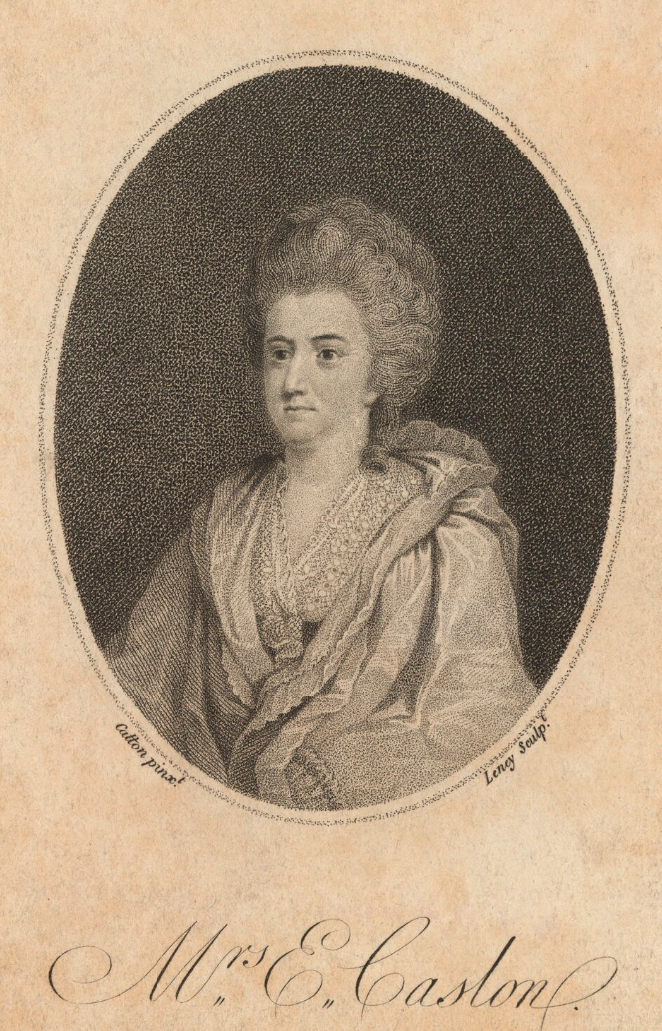
- by Leney
- Born: 31 July 1730; London
- Died: 3 March 1795 (aged 64); London
- Occupation: typefounder
- Spouse: William Caslon
- Relatives: daughter in law Elizabeth Caslon

Elizabeth Caslon, born Elizabeth Cartlich (31 July 1730 – 3 March 1795), was a British typefounder. She ran the family's Caslon foundry with her husband and when he died she carried it on as Elizabeth Caslon and sons. After her death, the business was auctioned and it was bought by her business partner and her former daughter in law who was another "Elizabeth Caslon".

== Life ==
Caslon was born in London as Elizabeth Cartlich in 1730. Her mother was also called Elizabeth and her father was William Cartlich. She married William Caslon (II) on 25 July 1751, he was the son of another William Caslon (I). Both of these Williams ran a type founding business. She and her husband had a son in 1754 called William Caslon (III) and the following year another son named Henry Caslon.

Her father in law, William Caslon (I), died in 1766. Elizabeth was involved in running the business with her husband. They supplied Caslon type to the American colonies. When the United States Declaration of Independence was first printed in 1776, it was with a Caslon type.

When her husband died on 17 August 1788 without a will, his property was shared between herself and their two sons William Caslon III and Henry Caslon. She took over the business and carried it on as Elizabeth Caslon and sons.

Caslon was noted for its typefaces. Her son Henry (I) married another Elizabeth and they had a son named Henry (II) in 1786. Henry (I) died in 1788 and his share went to his widow. Elizabeth Caslon was in business with Elizabeth Caslon (her daughter in law) and her son William Caslon until 1792 when she and William had a disagreement. William sold up and bought another factory.

== Death and legacy ==
Caslon died in London in 1795. Her will caused confusion and went to the courts of chancery. The courts ruled that the business should be put up for auction and her daughter in law Elizabeth Caslon bought it. She had remarried and her new name was Strong but she continued to use the Caslon name while she was in business.

Caslon's likeness was captured by Charles Catton and a stipple engraving of this by William Satchwell Leney. A copy of this is in the National Portrait Gallery in London.
