= Cardón =

Cardón can refer to:

- Cardón, Venezuela, a town in Venezuela
- Echinopsis atacamensis, a species of cactus
- Euphorbia canariensis, a cactus-like species of Euphorbia
- Pachycereus pringlei, a species of cactus
