= Norman Carlyon =

Australian cricketer (born 1938)

Personal information
- Born: 5 May 1938 (age 88); Melbourne, Australia
- Batting: Right-handed
- Role: Wicketkeeper

Domestic team information
- Years: Team
- 1961/62–1969/70: Victoria

Career statistics
Competition	FC	LA
Matches	11	3
Runs scored	177	35
Batting average	13.61	35.00
100s/50s	0/0	0/0
Top score	26	22*
Balls bowled	-	-
Wickets	-	-
Bowling average	-	-
5 wickets in innings	-	-
10 wickets in match	-	–
Best bowling	-	-
Catches/stumpings	38/6	6/1
- Source: Cricinfo, 24 June 2026

Norman Carlyon (born 5 May 1938) is an Australian former cricketer. He played eleven first-class cricket matches for Victoria between 1962 and 1970.

== See also ==
- List of Victoria first-class cricketers
