= Ken Carlon =

Australian rules footballer

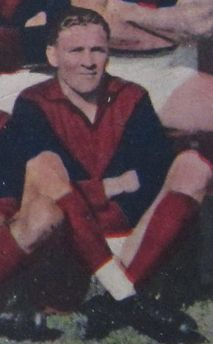

Personal information
- Full name: Kenneth Carlon
- Born: 5 October 1923; Carlton, Victoria
- Died: 5 January 2004 (aged 80)
- Original team: Greensborough

Playing career^{1}
Years	Club	Games (Goals)
1949–50	Melbourne	30 (6)
- ^{1} Playing statistics correct to the end of 1950.

Kenneth Carlon (5 October 1923 – 5 January 2004) was an Australian rules footballer who played with Melbourne in the Victorian Football League (VFL).

== War Service ==
Carlon served in the Australian Army during World War II.

== Football ==
After first training with Melbourne in 1946, Carlon made his senior debut in 1949 and played 30 games over two seasons. He was subsequently captain of Melbourne's Reserve side in 1951 and 1952.

In 1953, Carlon was captain / coach of the Rennie Football Club in the Coreen & District Football League.

In 1954, Carlon was appointed as coach of the Cornwall Football Club in Launceston, Tasmania.
