= Carbon County =

Carbon County may refer to one of the following US counties:

- Carbon County, Montana
- Carbon County, Pennsylvania
- Carbon County, Utah
- Carbon County, Wyoming
