= Cartledge =

Coordinates: 53.2935°N 01.5139°W

- Location within Derbyshire
- OS grid reference: SK3277
- Shire county: Derbyshire
- Region: East Midlands
- Country: England
- Sovereign state: United Kingdom
- Police: Derbyshire
- Fire: Derbyshire
- Ambulance: East Midlands

Cartledge is a hamlet in Derbyshire, England. It is 10 kilometres (6 mi) southwest of Sheffield, and just south of the village of Holmesfield. Its name is derived from the Old Norse kartr, meaning rocky ground, and the Old English pre 7th-century loecc, meaning boggy stream. It features Cartledge Hall, which was built c.1492 by John Wolstenholme and later rebuilt during Elizabethan times.
