= Bluebird Restaurant =

Historic restaurant in Utah, U.S.

Coordinates: 41.73180°N 111.83523°W

Bluebird Restaurant is a historic restaurant in Logan in the state of Utah. It was established in 1914 and it claims to be the oldest restaurant in the state.

== History ==
Bluebird Restaurant was established in 1914 by O. Guy Cardon and Mark Neuberger as a candy and ice cream shop. It eventually became a full service restaurant. Members of the high society would host luncheons and meetings during its early days. The Bluebird restaurant was able to withstand the Great Depression and World War II.

The Xu family bought the restaurant in 1994.

== Features ==
Some modern luxuries are installed at the Bluebird restaurant but the building has retained its original design. The restaurant has themed rooms, namely the Mural room, the Pioneer room and the Ballroom. The mural room is decorated with paintings of the history of Cache Valley; The Pioneer room was named after the Utah pioneers and is decorated with that theme; meanwhile, dances used to be held at the ballroom until the 1940s.
