= Siah Karbon =

Siah Karbon سياه كاربن
- Village
- Location within Iran
- Coordinates: 36°50′27″N 49°51′08″E
- Country: Iran
- Province: Gilan
- County: Siahkal
- Bakhsh: Deylaman
- Rural District: Deylaman

Population (2006)
  - Total: 83
- Time zone: UTC+3:30 (IRST)

Siah Karbon (Persian: سياه كاربن, also Romanized as Sīāh Kārbon; also known as Sīāh Gārbon, Sīāh Kārbun, and Siakh-Karbun) is a village in Deylaman Rural District, Deylaman District, Siahkal County, Gilan Province, Iran. At the 2016 census, its population was 69, in 24 families. Down from 83 people in 2006.
