= Raoul Carton =

French philosopher

Abbé Raoul Maurice Jean Carton (1879 – 7 July 1934) was a French philosopher.

== Life ==
Raoul Maurice Jean Carton was born in Blois, France, in 1879. A Catholic priest, he became professor of philosophy at Stanislas College (Collège Stanislas) and the Catholic Institute (Institut Catholique) in Paris. He particularly focused on the work of Roger Bacon, who had been considered a lone scientific genius by 19th century scholarship but whom Carton and others labored to return to his medieval context. He died in Paris on 7 July 1934.

== Works ==
- La Synthèse Doctrinale de Roger Bacon [Roger Bacon's Doctrinal Synthesis], Paris, 1924. (in French)
- L'Expérience Mystique de l'Illumination Intérieure chez Roger Bacon [Roger Bacon's Mystical Experience of Interior Illumination], Paris, 1924. (in French)
- L'Expérience Physique chez Roger Bacon: Contribution à l'Étude de la Méthode et de la Science Expérimentales au XIIIe Siècle [Roger Bacon's Physical Experience: A Contribution to a Study on the Method and Experimental Science in the 13th Century, Paris, 1924. (in French)
- "Le Christianisme et l'Augustinisme de Boece [Boece's Christianity and Augustinism]", Revue de Philosophie [Philosophy Review], vol. 30, 1930, pp. 573–659. (in French)
