= William Caslon =

English typographer and gunsmith (1692/93–1766)

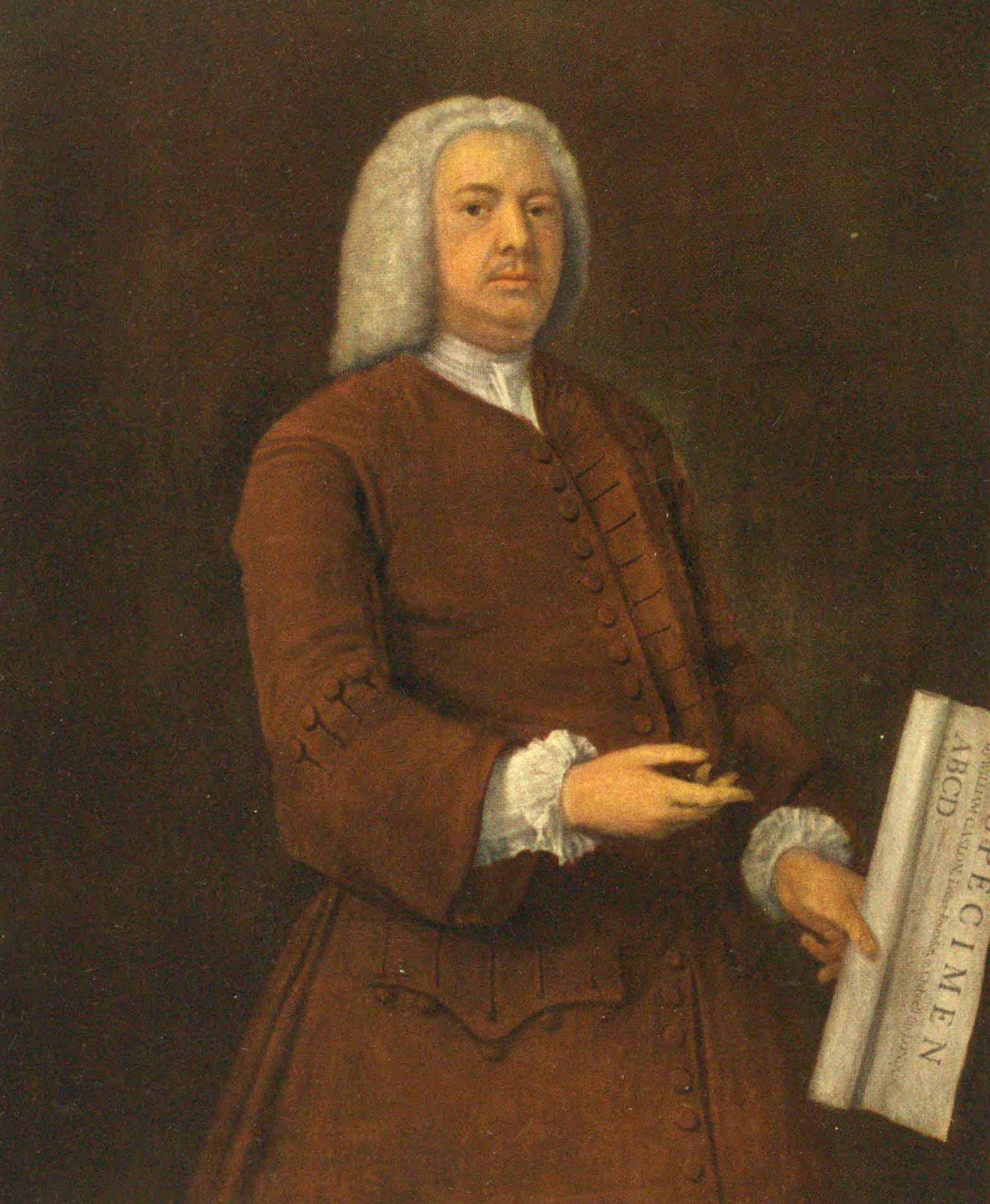
- Portrait (Caslon holding a specimen of his types) by Francis Kyte
- Born: 1692/93; Cradley, Worcestershire
- Died: 23 January 1766 (aged 72–73); London, England
- Occupations: Gunsmith; type designer

William Caslon I (1692/93 – 23 January 1766), also known as William Caslon the Elder, was an English typefounder. The distinction and legibility of his type secured him the patronage of the leading printers of the day in England and on the continent. His typefaces transformed English type design and first established an English national typographic style.

== Life ==
Caslon was born in Cradley, Worcestershire in 1692 or 1693 and trained as an engraver in nearby Birmingham. In 1716, he started business in London as an engraver of gun locks and barrels and as a bookbinder's tool cutter. Having contact with printers, he was induced to fit up a type foundry, largely through the encouragement of William Bowyer.

He died on 23 January 1766, and was buried in the churchyard of St Luke Old Street, London, where the family tomb is preserved (bearing his name and others).

== Typefaces ==
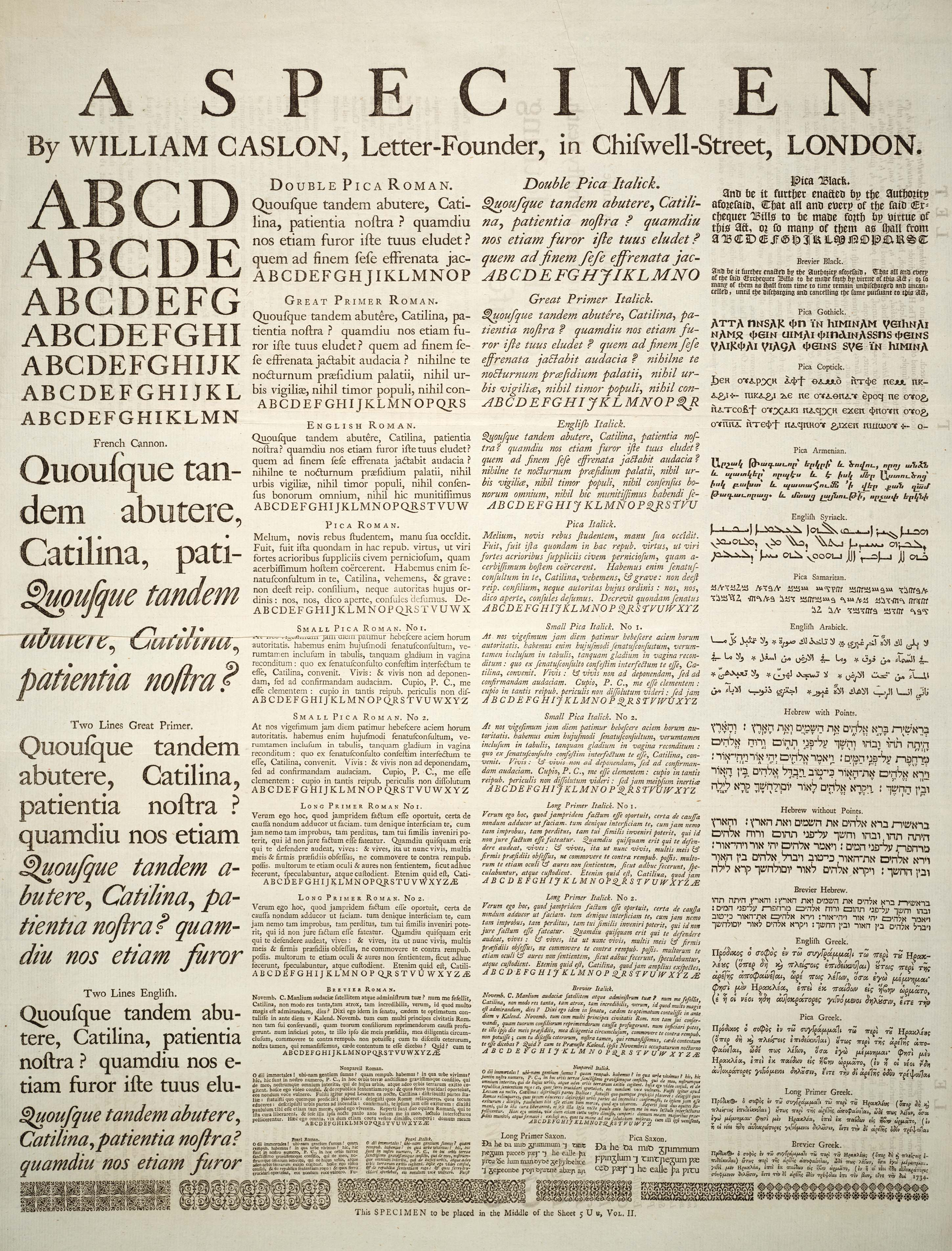
A specimen sheet of typefaces and languages, by William Caslon I, letter founder; from the 1728 Cyclopaedia

Though his name would come to be identified with an enduring style of Latin alphabet, Caslon's first typefaces were what contemporary typefounders called "exotics". His first design was an Arabic made at the English size (14pt), commissioned by the Society for Promoting Christian Knowledge before 1725, followed by a Hebrew created for William Bowyer in 1726, and a Coptic for Wilkins first used in 1731. His first Latin typefaces were a roman and italic cut in the pica size (12pt), of a style that was fully realized by the publication of his foundry's specimen sheet in 1734. In 1763, Caslon released a full specimen book of his existing type, the first of its kind to be produced out of England.

Caslon's typefaces were inspired by the Dutch Baroque types, the most commonly used types in England before Caslon's faces.

Caslon typefaces were immediately popular and used for many important printed works, including the first printed version of the United States Declaration of Independence. Caslon's types became so popular that the expression about typeface choice, "when in doubt, use Caslon", came about. The Caslon types fell out of favour in the century after his death, but were revived in the 1840s. Several revivals of the Caslon types are widely used today.

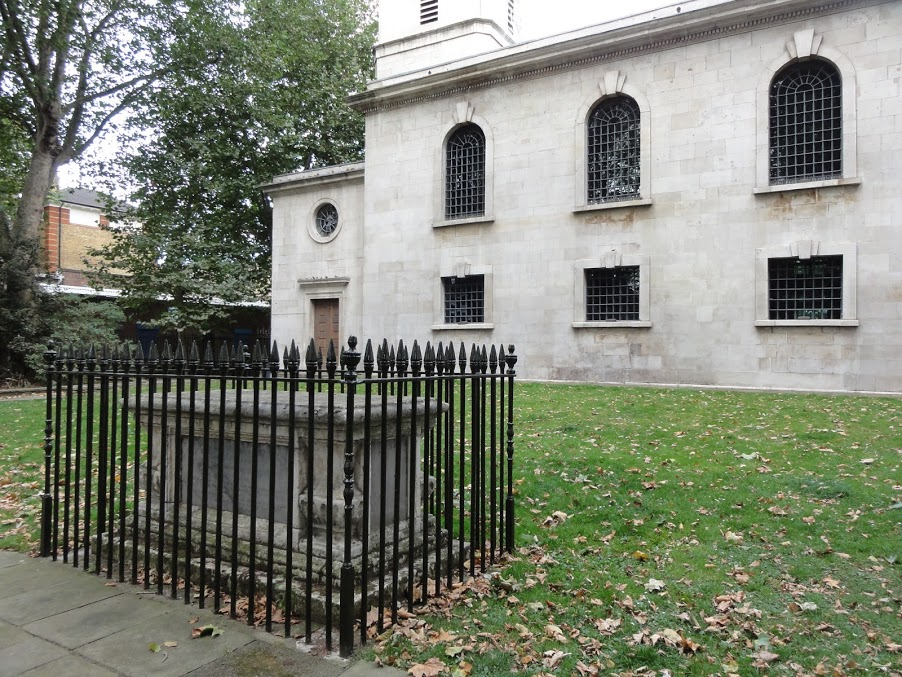
The Caslon family tomb in the churchyard of St Luke Old Street, London. The church is now a music venue and rehearsal space.

== The Caslon Foundry as a business ==
William Caslon I founded the Caslon Foundry in 1739, based on what previously had been Godfrey Head's (1685–1700). The other half of that business was purchased by John James, son of Thomas James. John James in the period 1716–1764 also built up by purchase what became the leading English type foundry of the 18th and early 19th centuries. He acquired moiety of half of Robert Mitchell and Jacob Ilive in 1740. A later and important purchase was the foundry of Thomas Grover in 1758. James ultimately combined under his own direction nine old English Foundries.

John James, William Caslon I and John Baskerville were left by consolidation as the only three representatives of the trade in the country. Caslon had two apprentices in his Foundry, Thomas Cottrell and Joseph Jackson. They started a foundry of their own in direct competition to their employer in 1757. In 1759 Jackson entered the Navy leaving Cottrell to carry on alone. Jackson left the navy in 1763 and continued to be employed in Thomas Cottrell, Neveil's court 1759–1785 Foundry for a short time. He commenced business in a separate Foundry with two fellow workman who helped to find the capital 1764 – 1792. When Jackson died in 1792 it was William Caslon I's grandson, William Caslon III who purchased the foundry in Salisbury Square.

Following the death of William Caslon I in 1766, his son William Caslon II took over the Caslon Foundry, running it with the assistance of his wife, Elizabeth née Cartlich, until his own death in 1778. Elizabeth Caslon then continued to manage it jointly with her two sons, William Caslon III (1754–1833) and Henry Caslon (c.1755–1788) trading as "Elizabeth Caslon and Sons". Henry died in 1788, and in 1792 William III sold his share of the business to his mother and his sister-in-law, Elizabeth née Rowe, Henry's widow: the two Elizabeth Caslons continued to run it until the elder Elizabeth's death in 1795. As a result of a legal dispute over the terms of her will, the Foundry was then thrown into Chancery and put up for auction in 1799. It was bought by the younger Elizabeth Caslon, who took into partnership a distant relative, Nathaniel Catherwood. Both partners died in 1809. The subsequent proprietors were: Henry Caslon II and F. F. Catherwood, 1809–1821; Henry Caslon II, H. W. Caslon and M. W. Livermore (trading as Caslon, Son and Livermore), 1821–1840; Caslon & Son, 1840–1850; H. W. Caslon and Co., 1850–1873. H. W. Caslon died in 1873, when the Foundry was acquired by T. W. Smith and partners. However, the Company name remained H. W. Caslon and Co. Ltd., and continued running until 1937, when it was acquired by Stephenson Blake.

Meanwhile, following his sale of his share in the original foundry in 1792, William Caslon III had purchased (in the same year) the Salisbury Square foundry from the estate of the recently deceased Joseph Jackson, and renamed it W. Caslon & Son. In 1807, W. Caslon & Son was passed to William Caslon IV. In 1819, William IV sold the business to the new Sheffield foundry of Blake, Garnett & Co. In 1837, the Salisbury Square Caslon Foundry became the property of Stephenson, Blake & Co.

=== H. W. Caslon and Company Limited ===
In 1998, Justin Howes reestablished the Caslon foundry, under the name H. W. Caslon & Company Limited, with an expanded version of ITC Founder's Caslon as the company's initial product. However, following the death of Justin Howes in 2005, the revived H. W. Caslon & Company was no longer in business, and the expanded Founders Caslon is no longer offered in the retail market. The rights to Howes' digital Caslon were bequeathed by their creator to St Bride Printing Library in London but to date the types have not been reissued.

== See also ==
- His typeface, Caslon
- Early American publishers and printers

== Bibliography ==
- Hansard, Thomas Curson (1825). Typographia: An Historical Sketch of the Origin and Progress of the Art of Printing. Baldwin, Cradock and Joy. p. 346.
- Hill, Joseph (1971) [1907]. The Book Makers of Old Birmingham: Authors, Printers, and Book Sellers. New York: B. Franklin. pp. 56–57. ISBN 0833717065.
- Luna, Paul; Ould, Martyn (2013). "The Printed Page". In Gadd, Ian (ed.). Beginnings to 1780. History of Oxford University Press. Vol. 1. Oxford: Oxford University Press. pp. 511–545. ISBN 978-0199557318.
- Maxted, Ian (2004). "Caslon [née Cartlich], Elizabeth (1730–1795), typefounder". Oxford Dictionary of National Biography (online ed.). Oxford University Press. doi:10.1093/ref:odnb/74230. (Subscription, Wikipedia Library access or UK public library membership required.)
- Mosley, James (2008) [2004]. "Caslon, William, the elder (1692–1766), typefounder". Oxford Dictionary of National Biography (online ed.). Oxford University Press. doi:10.1093/ref:odnb/4857. (Subscription, Wikipedia Library access or UK public library membership required.)
- Updike, Daniel Berkeley (1922). Printing Types: their History, Forms, and Use: a study in survivals. Vol. 2. Cambridge, Mass.: Harvard University Press.
