= Sam Cartledge =

English footballer

Personal information
- Full name: Samuel Henry Cartledge
- Date of birth: 1882
- Place of birth: Basford, England
- Date of death: 16 January 1938 (aged 55–56)
- Position: Goalkeeper

Senior career*
| Years | Team | Apps | (Gls) |
| 1901–1902 | Hainton Swifts | | |
| 1902–1903 | West Marsh Social | | |
| 1903–1904 | Grimsby St John's | | |
| 1904–1907 | Grimsby Town | 52 | (0) |
| 1907 | Queens Park Rangers | | |
| 1907–1908 | Worksop Town | | |
| 1908–1909 | Hainton Swifts | | |
| 1909–1910 | Grimsby St John's | | |
| 1910–191? | Grimsby Rangers | | |
- * Club domestic league appearances and goals

Samuel Henry Cartledge (1882 – 16 January 1938) was an English professional footballer who played as a goalkeeper.
