= Carbon, Pennsylvania =

Unincorporated community in Pennsylvania, US

Carbon
- Unincorporated community
- Location within the state of Pennsylvania Carbon (the United States)
- Coordinates: 40°17′25″N 79°33′37″W
- Country: United States
- State: Pennsylvania
- County: Westmoreland
- Elevation: 1,099 ft (335 m)
- Time zone: UTC-5 (Eastern (EST))
  - Summer (DST): UTC-4 (EDT)
- GNIS feature ID: 1171187

Carbon is an unincorporated community and coal town in Westmoreland County, Pennsylvania, United States.
