= Dick Catledge =

United States Air Force general

Richard C. Catledge
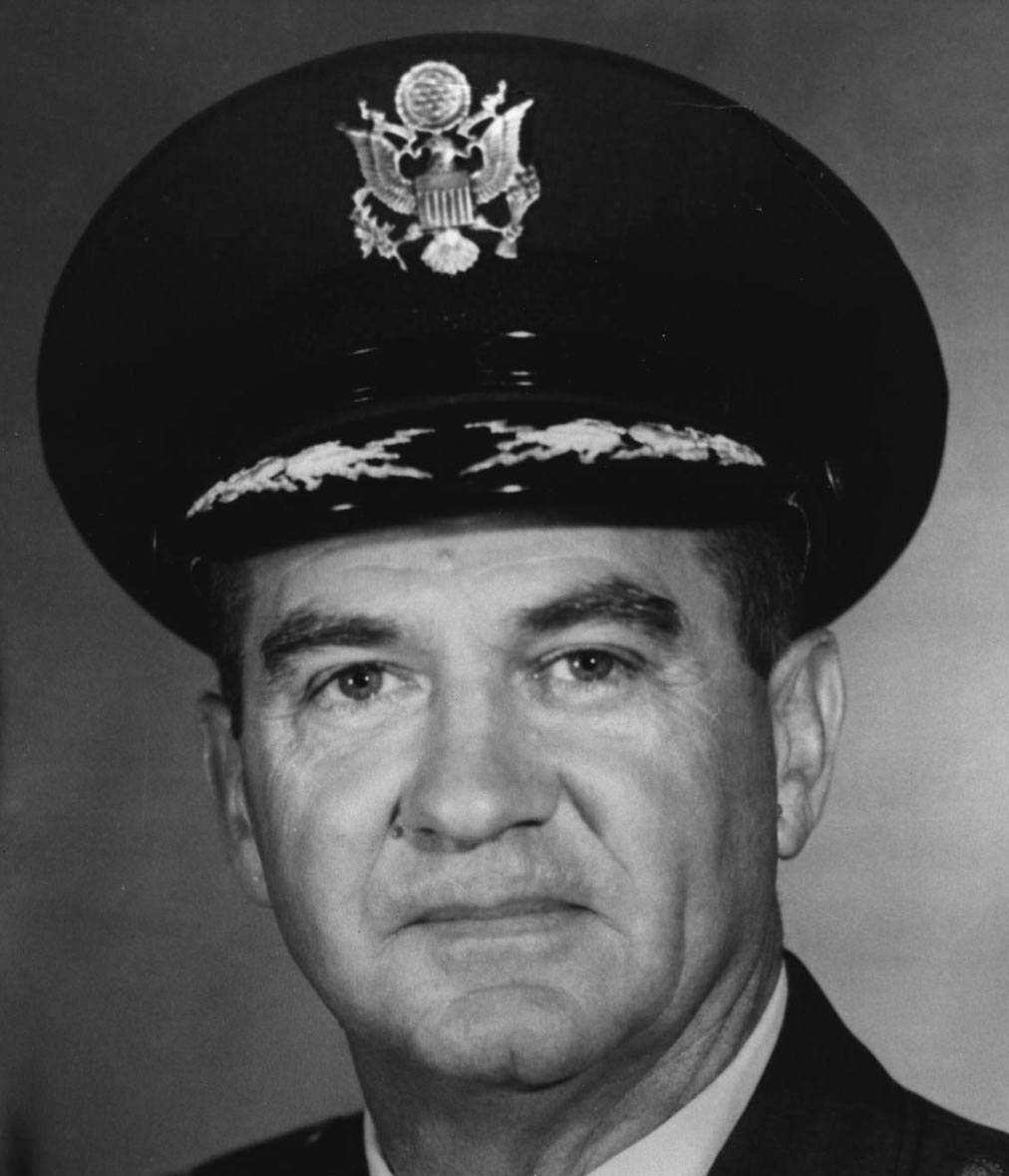
- Major General Catledge
- Born: November 21, 1920; Shawnee, Oklahoma
- Died: August 8, 2007 (aged 86); Niceville, Florida
- Military career
- Allegiance: United States of America
- Branch: United States Air Force; United States Army Air Forces
- Rank: General
- Nickname: Thunderbird One

Richard C. Catledge (November 21, 1920 – August 12, 2007), born in Shawnee, Oklahoma, was a major general in the US Air Force.

He formed and led the first U.S. Air Force Air Demonstration Squadron, the Thunderbirds.

== Education ==
He was raised in Memphis, Tennessee. Catledge was a great participant in sports during his high school years, especially in diving. He won the state championship in diving when he was moved back to Oklahoma, where he finished high school. In these years, Catledge would also find one of the things he enjoyed a great deal in life, motorcycles, not to mention the stunts he would come to pull with them. While attending Compton Junior College in southern California, he also won the southern California junior college diving championship.

== Military career ==
After college, Catledge joined the Army Air Corps in March 1942. May of the next year saw him earn his pilot wings and commission in May 1943. He was assigned to the 71st Fighter Squadron, 1st Fighter Group, Mediterranean Theater of Operations, flying the P-38 Lightning. He flew 23 combat missions, and was shot down on August 28, 1943. After his first week of capture he attempted an escape that failed, only to re-try a week later, successfully evading the enemy for nine months until he safely reached Allied territory. After this time he served as a pilot instructor to the P-6 Hawk, P-51 Mustang and P-47 Thunderbolt aircraft.

During the summer of 1950, he was sent to the 57th Fighter Group in Alaska to fly the P-80 Shooting Star, and in 1951, converted to the F-94B. In 1951, he was promoted to major and became the commanding officer of the 66th Fighter Squadron. He was sent to the Air Command and Staff College and after graduating in 1952 was sent to Luke Air Force Base, Arizona.

In 1953, Catledge became the first leader of the famed United States Air Force Air Demonstration squad, known as the Thunderbirds.

After his tour of duty with the Thunderbirds, he was sent to Randolph Air Force Base in the fall of 1954 to become the director of inspections at Headquarters Crew Training Air Force.

In 1956, he became the commanding officer of the 9th Fighter Bomber Squadron at Komaki Air Base, Japan, and then became the Chief, Tactical Evaluation Branch, at Headquarters Fifth Air Force.

In 1959, he was assigned to the Navy War College, and after graduation, was stationed at Headquarters United States Air Force in the Directorate of Operations. While in that posting he played a major role in convincing the leadership in the Air Force the McDonnell Douglas F-4 Phantom II needed to be equipped with a gun. This led first to the installation of the gun pod, and later an internal gun, which was first introduced in the F-4E model.

Having been promoted to the rank of colonel, he was assigned in the summer of 1964 to the 50th Tactical Fighter Wing, Hahn Air Base, Germany, where, as the director of operations, he flew the F-100 Super Sabre.

He later was transferred to the 3rd Tactical Fighter Wing at Bien Hoa Air Base, Republic of Vietnam, where he flew 141 combat missions and served as the wing's commanding officer. He returned to the United States in 1967 and was assigned as commander of the 4510th Combat Crew Training Wing at Luke Air Force Base.

He was promoted to brigadier general, and in July 1969 was assigned to Headquarters Tactical Air Command as inspector general.

He was promoted to major general and became the commanding officer of the Tactical Air Warfare Center at Eglin Air Force Base, Florida.

== Retirement ==
General Catledge retired in 1973 and lived with his wife Linda in Niceville, Florida. General Catledge died due to complications from pneumonia on August 12, 2007, at the age of 87.
