= Cartan =

Cartan may refer to:

- Élie Cartan (1869–1951), French mathematician who worked with Lie groups
- Henri Cartan (1904–2008), French mathematician who worked in algebraic topology, son of Élie Cartan
- Anna Cartan (1878–1923), French mathematician and teacher, sister of Élie Cartan
- Cartan (crater), a lunar crater named for Élie Cartan
- Badea Cârțan (1849–1911), Austro-Hungarian Romanian activist
