= Carlin (name) =

Carlin is a unisex given name and surname of Irish origin. As a feminine given name, a secondary origin is as an alternate form of Carla, Carol or Caroline. Notable people with the name include:

== Surname ==
- Ben Carlin (1912–1981), Australian adventurer and engineer
- Bob Carlin (born 1953), musician
- Brian Carlin (born 1950), baseball player
- Charles Creighton Carlin (1866–1938), politician
- Clay Carlin (1989–2007), fictional character
- Daniel Carlin (born 1959), doctor
- Dan Carlin (born 1965), political commentator
- Dave Carlin, politician
- David Carlin (born 1938), politician and sociologist
- Dermot Carlin, football player
- George Carlin (1937–2008), comedian and social critic
- John Carlin (disambiguation), multiple people
  - John Carlin (actor) (1929–2017) Scottish actor
  - John Carlin (artist) (1813–1891), American painter and writer
  - John Carlin (businessman) (born 1955), American entrepreneur, art historian and record producer
  - John Carlin (footballer) (1871–?), English footballer for Liverpool F.C.
  - John Carlin (journalist) (born 1956), journalist and author
  - John Carlin (umpire) (1861–1944), cricketer and test umpire
  - John P. Carlin, Assistant Attorney General for Justice National Security Division
  - John W. Carlin (born 1940), governor of Kansas, 1979–1987, and Archivist of the United States, 1995–2005
- Leo Carlin (born 1937), American football businessman
- Leo P. Carlin (1908–1999), mayor
- Luke Carlin (born 1980), baseball player
- Lynn Carlin (born 1938), actress
- Martin Carlin (c. 1730 – 1785), cabinetmaker
- Máiréad Carlin (born 1988), singer
- Mario Carlin (1915–1984), Italian operatic tenor
- Mary Carlin Yates (born 1946), civil servant
- Mike Carlin (born 1958), comic book writer and editor
- Patrick Carlin (1832–1895), recipient of the Victoria Cross
- Paul N. Carlin, civil servant
- Phillips Carlin (1894–1971), broadcaster and executive
- Robert Carlin (1901–1991), union organizer and politician
- Sean Carlin (born 1967), hammer thrower
- Spencer Carlin, fictional character
- Sydney Carlin (disambiguation), multiple people
- Trevor Carlin, racing team owner
- Vince Carlin, civil servant
- Wendy Carlin (born 1957), Australian professor of economics
- Willie Carlin (born 1940), football player
- William P. Carlin (1829–1903), Army General

== Given name ==
- Carlin Davison (born 2003), New Zealand basketball player
- Carlin Glynn (born 1940), American actress
- Carlin Hartman (born 1972), American basketball coach
- Carlin Hudson (born 1996), American soccer player
- Carlin Isles (born 1989), American rugby sevens player
- Carlin Itonga (born 1982), Congolese football player
- Carlin Meyer (born 1948), American professor
- Carlin Romano, American literary critic
- Carlin Craig Woodruff Jr., known as Carlos Morales (actor), Filipino actor and director
- Carlin Yoder, American politician

== See also ==
- Carli (given name)
- Carlie
- Carlina (name)
- Carlini (name)
- Carlino (name)
- Carlien Dirkse van den Heuvel
- Carlon
- Charlin (name)
