= Carlino (disambiguation) =

Carlino may refer to:

== People ==
- Carlino (surname), Italian surname

== Toponyms ==
- Carlino, comune (municipality) in the Province of Udine in the Italian region Friuli-Venezia Giulia

== Other ==
- Il Resto del Carlino, Italian newspaper based in Bologna

== See also ==
- Carlin (disambiguation)
- Carlina (name)
- Carling (disambiguation)
- Carlini (disambiguation)
- Carlinos
- Carlito (disambiguation)
