= Cîrligați =

Cîrligați may refer to:

- Călmățuiu, commune in Teleorman County, Romania
- Pădureni, Vaslui, Romania

== See also ==
- Cârlig (disambiguation)
- Cârligi (disambiguation)
- Cârligei (disambiguation)
- Cârligu River (disambiguation)
- Cârligele River (disambiguation)
