= Carmina (name) =

Carmina is a feminine given name. Notable people with the name include:

== As a given name ==
- Carmina Belmonte (born 1950), Spanish academic and politician
- Carmina Escobar (born 1981), Mexican singer
- Carmiña Giraldo (born 1976), Colombian tennis player
- Carminia Lourdes Cynthia Arnaldo Gutierrez (born 1971), Filipino actress better known as Chin-Chin Gutierrez
- Carmiña Londoño, Colombian-American scientist
- Carmina Presinszky (born 1994), Austrian taekwondo athlete
- Carmina Riego (born 1964), Chilean actress
- Carmina Useros (1928–2017), Spanish writer
- Carmina Verdú (born 1983), Spanish rhythmic gymnast
- Carmina Villarroel (born 1975), Filipino actress
- Carmina Virgili (1927–2014), Spanish geologist

== As a surname ==
- Rosa Carmina (born 1929), Cuban-Mexican actress and dancer

== See also ==
- Carmina (disambiguation)
- Carlina (name)
