= John Carlin =

John Carlin may refer to:

- John Carlin (actor) (1929–2017), Scottish actor
- John Carlin (painter) (1813–1891), American painter
- John Carlin (businessman) (born 1955), American entrepreneur, art historian and record producer
- John Carlin (footballer) (1878–1935), English footballer for Liverpool F.C.
- John Carlin (journalist) (born 1956), journalist and author
- John Carlin (umpire) (1861–1944), cricketer and test umpire
- John Carlin (professor), Australian statistician
- John P. Carlin, Assistant Attorney General for Justice National Security Division
- John W. Carlin (born 1940), governor of Kansas, 1979–1987, and Archivist of the United States, 1995–2005

== See also ==
- John Carling (1828–1911), politician
- John R. Carling, writer
