= Carlini =

Carlini may refer to:

== People ==
- Carlini (surname), Italian surname

== Other ==
- Andrena carlini, a species of mining bee in the family Andrenidae
- Carlini (crater), a lunar crater
- Carlini Station, Argentinian base in Antarctica (ex-Jubany)
- Lobelia Carlini, a Japanese steampunk media franchise
- Carlini, plural of carlino, a medieval south Italian coin, see Gigliato

== See also ==
- Carlina (name)
- Carlino (disambiguation)
