= Carling (given name) =

- Gender: Unisex
- Language: English

Origin
- Language: Gaelic Irish
- Origin: Carl
- Meaning: Little Champion

Other names
- Variant forms: Carl, Carlin, Carly, Carline, Carlina, Carla
- Cognate: Carling

Carling is a unisex given name of Gaelic Irish origin. It is a variant form of Carl.

== Meaning ==
Little champion

== Variant forms ==
Alternate forms of the name, including spelling variations, nicknames and diminutive forms, include:

- Carl
- Carla
- Carli (given name)
- Carlin (given name)
- Carlina
- Carline

== People ==
- Carling Bassett-Seguso (born 1967), Canadian professional tennis player and granddaughter of John Carling
- Carling Malouf (1916–2007), American archeologist
- Carling Zeeman (born 1991), Canadian rower

== See also ==
- Carling (disambiguation)
- Carling (surname)
- Carlina (name)
- Carlini (name)
- Carlino (name)
