= Curl =

Curl or CURL may refer to:

== Science and technology ==
- Curl (mathematics), a vector operator that shows a vector field's rate of rotation
- Curl (programming language), an object-oriented programming language designed for interactive Web content
- cURL, a program and application library for transferring data with URLs
- Antonov An-26, an aircraft, NATO reporting name CURL

== Sports and weight training ==
- Curl (association football), is spin on the ball, which will make it swerve when kicked
- Curl, in the sport of curling, the curved path a stone makes on the ice or the act of playing; see Glossary of curling
- Biceps curl, a weight training exercise
- Leg curl, a weight training exercise
- Wrist curl, a weight training exercise

== Other uses ==
- Curl (Japanese snack), a brand of corn puffs
- Curl or ringlet, a lock of hair that grows in a curved, rather than straight, direction
- Consortium of University Research Libraries, an association of UK academic and research libraries
- Executive curl, the ring above a naval officer's gold lace or braid rank insignia

== People with the surname ==
- Britta Curl-Salemme (born 2000), American ice hockey player
- Kamren Curl (born 1999), American football player
- Martina Gangle Curl (1906–1994), American artist and activist
- Robert Curl (1933–2022), Nobel Laureate and emeritus professor of chemistry at Rice University
- Rod Curl (born 1943), American professional golfer
- Phil Curls (1942–2007), American politician
- Catarina Miranda (born 1990), Portuguese musician with the stage name Emma Curl

== See also ==
- Curling (disambiguation)
- Overlap (disambiguation)
- Spiral
