= Hamstring curl =

Hamstring curl may refer to a variety of exercises that target the hamstrings, including:

- Nordic hamstring curl
- Leg curl
