= Australian cricket team in England in 1905 =

International cricket tour

The Australian cricket team in England in 1905 played 35 first-class matches including 5 Tests. Australia was captained by Joe Darling. The England captain in all five Tests was Stanley Jackson.

== The touring team ==
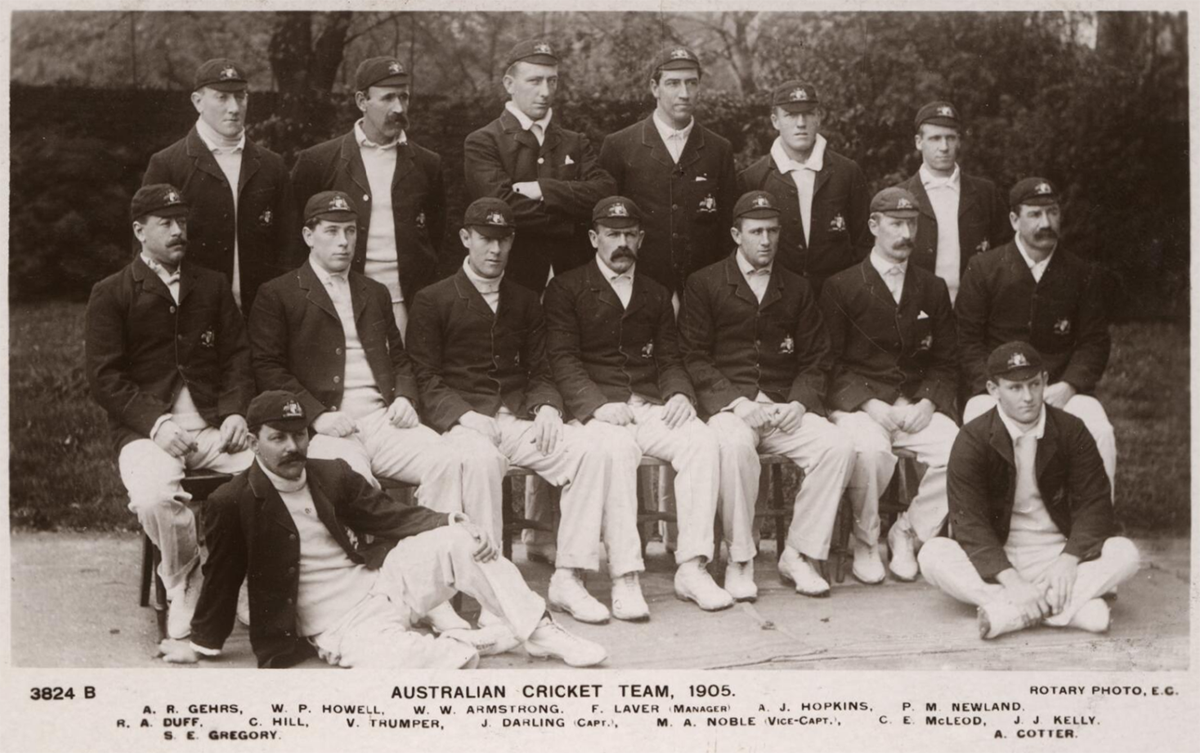
The Australian team that toured England in 1905.

- Joe Darling (captain)
- Monty Noble (vice-captain)
- Warwick Armstrong
- Tibby Cotter
- Reggie Duff
- Algy Gehrs
- Syd Gregory
- Clem Hill
- Bert Hopkins
- Bill Howell
- Jim Kelly
- Frank Laver
- Charlie McLeod
- Phil Newland
- Victor Trumper

Laver was the player-manager, assisted by Newland.

== Test series summary ==
England won the Test series 2–0, with three matches drawn.

=== First Test ===
29–31 May 1905
Scorecard

England	v	Australia
196 (71.3 overs); JT Tyldesley 56; FJ Laver 7/64 (31.3 overs)		221 (63.5 overs); C Hill 54; FS Jackson 5/52 (14.5 overs)
426/5d (153 overs); AC MacLaren 140; RA Duff 2/43 (15 overs)		188 (72.4 overs); SE Gregory 51; BJT Bosanquet 8/107 (32.4 overs)

England won by 213 runs
Trent Bridge, Nottingham
Umpires: J Carlin and J Phillips

- England won the toss and elected to bat.

The Australian second innings in this match still holds the record for the lowest innings total (188) when a bowler conceded 100 runs (BJT Bosanquet 8/107).

=== Second Test ===
15–17 June 1905
Scorecard

England	v	Australia
282 (140 overs); CB Fry 73; AJY Hopkins 3/40 (15 overs)		181 (50.1 overs); J Darling 41; FS Jackson 4/50 (15 overs)
151/5 (50 overs); AC MacLaren 79; WW Armstrong 3/30 (10 overs)

Match drawn
Lord's, London
Umpires: J Phillips and W Richards

- England won the toss and elected to bat.
- There was no play on the final day.

=== Third Test ===
3–5 July 1905
Scorecard

England	v	Australia
301 (128.3 overs); FS Jackson 144*; CE McLeod 3/88 (37 overs)		195 (53.2 overs); WW Armstrong 66; A Warren 5/57 (19.2 overs)
295/5d (104 overs); JT Tyldesley 100; WW Armstrong 5/122 (51 overs)		224/7 (91 overs); MA Noble 62; C Blythe 3/41 (24 overs)

Match drawn
Headingley, Leeds
Umpires: J Phillips and VA Titchmarsh

- England won the toss and elected to bat.
- D Denton and A Warren (both ENG) made their Test debuts.

=== Fourth Test ===
24–26 July 1905
Scorecard

England	v	Australia
446 (157.5 overs); FS Jackson 113; CE McLeod 5/125 (47 overs)		197 (45.5 overs); J Darling 73; W Brearley 4/72 (17 overs)
		169 (f/o) (52.3 overs); RA Duff 60; W Brearley 4/54 (14 overs)

England won by an innings and 80 runs
Old Trafford, Manchester
Umpires: J Carlin and JE West

- England won the toss and elected to bat.
- RH Spooner and W Brearley (both ENG) made their Test debuts.

=== Fifth Test ===
14–16 August 1905
Scorecard

England	v	Australia
430 (130 overs); CB Fry 144; A Cotter 7/148 (40 overs)		363 (93.1 overs); RA Duff 146; W Brearley 5/110 (31.1 overs)
261/6d (80.3 overs); JT Tyldesley 112*; MA Noble 2/56 (14.3 overs)		124/4 (37 overs); C Hill 34; EG Arnold 1/17 (9 overs)

Match drawn
The Oval, London
Umpires: J Phillips and WAJ West

- England won the toss and elected to bat.

== Annual reviews ==
- Wisden Cricketers' Almanack 1906
