= Curling (disambiguation) =

Curling is a team sport involving moving stones across ice.

Curling may also refer to:

- Curling (metalworking), a metalworking process that forms a curled edge on sheet metal
- Curling (surname)
- Curling, Newfoundland and Labrador, a subdivision of the Canadian city of Corner Brook
- Curling bridge, a type of bridge
- Curling iron, a type of hair iron used to curl hair
- Curling's ulcer, a stress ulcer associated with severe burns
- Curling (film), a Canadian film directed by Denis Côté

== See also ==
- Curl (disambiguation)
