= Carloni =

Carloni is an Italian surname. Notable people with the surname include:

- Alessandro Carloni (born 1978), American animator
- Ester Carloni (1897–1998), Italian actress
- Giancarlo Carloni (born 1947), Italian footballer
- Ida Carloni Talli (1860–1940), Italian actress
- Mario Carloni (1894–1962), Italian soldier
- Pietro Carloni (1896–1968), Italian actor

== See also ==
- Carlini (name)
- Carlon
