= William Carlin (disambiguation) =

William Carlin (1829–1903), was a US Civil War General.

William Carlin may also refer to:

- William Carlin (footballer) (born 1940), English football player

== See also ==
- Will Carling, English rugby player
- Carlin (disambiguation)
