= Carlino (surname) =

Carlino is an Italian surname. Notable people using this name include the following:

- Joseph Francis Carlino (1917–2006), American politician
- Lewis John Carlino (1932–2020), American screenwriter and director

== See also ==
- Carlino (disambiguation)
- Carlino (surname)
- Carlin (name)
- Carlina (name)
- Carline
- Carling (given name)
- Carlini (name)
- Carlinos
- Carlito (name)
