= Lombard's paradox =

Paradoxical muscular contraction in humans

Lombard's paradox describes a paradoxical muscular contraction in humans. When rising to stand from a sitting or squatting position, both the hamstrings and quadriceps contract at the same time, despite them being antagonists to each other.

The rectus femoris biarticular muscle acting over the hip has a smaller hip moment arm than the hamstrings. However, the rectus femoris moment arm is greater over the knee than the hamstring knee moment. This means that contraction from both rectus femoris and hamstrings will result in hip and knee extension. Hip extension also adds a passive stretch component to rectus femoris, which results in a knee extension force. This paradox allows for efficient movement, especially during gait.
