= Carling (disambiguation) =

Carling is a Canadian brewery.

Carling may also refer to:

== Places ==
- Carling Avenue, a street in Ottawa, Ontario, Canada
  - Carling station, at Carling Avenue and Preston Street
- Carling, Moselle, a commune in the region Lorraine, France
- Carling, Ontario, a township in Parry Sound District, Canada

== People ==
- Carling (given name), a unisex given name
- Carling (surname), a surname
- A member of the Carolingian dynasty

== Other ==
- Carling (sailing), a piece of timber laid under the deck of a ship
- The Carling, a historic building in Jacksonville, Florida, US
- Carling Academy, operated by the Academy Music Group, including a list of venues
- Carling Campus, federal buildings in Ottawa, Ontario, Canada

== See also ==
- Carlingford (disambiguation)
- Charlene (disambiguation)
- Charlin (disambiguation)
- Carlin (disambiguation)
- Karlin (disambiguation)
