= Carmina (disambiguation) =

Carmina is the Latin name of the Odes, a collection of Latin poems by Horace.

Carmina may also refer to:

- The Carmina Catulli, the collected Latin poems of Catullus
- Carmina (album), a 1984 album by jazz pianist Tete Montoliu
- La Carmina, Canadian blogger and TV host
- Carmina, main character in Carmina or Blow Up (Carmina o revienta), a 2012 Spanish film
- Carmina, Spanish shoemaker based in Mallorca
- Carmina (name)

== See also ==
- Carlina (name)
- Carmina Burana, a collection of medieval poems and dramatic texts
  - Carmina Burana (Orff), cantata based on the medieval works
- Karmina, an American indie pop music duo
