= Cârligei =

Cârligei may refer to several villages in Romania:

- Cârligei, a village in Bucovăţ Commune, Dolj County
- Cârligei, a village in Bumbești-Pițic Commune, Gorj County

== See also ==
- Cârlig (disambiguation)
- Cârligi (disambiguation)
- Cârligu River (disambiguation)
- Cârligele River (disambiguation)
