= Cârligi =

Cârligi may refer to several villages in Romania:

- Cârligi, a village in Filipești Commune, Bacău County
- Cârligi, a village in Ştefan cel Mare Commune, Neamţ County

== See also ==
- Cârlig (disambiguation)
- Cârligei (disambiguation)
- Cârligu River (disambiguation)
- Cârligele River (disambiguation)
- Carlini (name)
