= Karlin =

Karlin may refer to:

== Places ==
=== Belarus ===
- Karlin (Pinsk), a village

=== Czech Republic ===
- Karlín, a district of Prague
- Karlín (Hodonín District), a municipality and village
- Karlín, a village and administrative part of Dolní Poustevna

=== Poland ===
- Karlin, Łódź Voivodeship, central Poland
- Karlin, West Pomeranian Voivodeship, north-west Poland

=== United States ===
- Karlin, Cleveland
- Karlin, Michigan
- Karlin, Missouri

== Other uses ==
- Karlin (surname)
- Karlin (Hasidic Dynasty)

== See also ==
- Carline (name)
- Carlin (disambiguation)
- Carling (disambiguation)
- Charlin (disambiguation)
- Charlene (disambiguation)
