= John West (cricketer, born 1861) =

English cricketer and umpire

Personal information
- Full name: John Edward West
- Born: 11 November 1861; Stepney, Middlesex, England
- Died: 14 March 1920 (aged 58); Bow, London, England
- Batting: Right-handed
- Bowling: Right-arm medium

Domestic team information
- Years: Team
- 1885–1896: Middlesex

Umpiring information
- Tests umpired: 1 (1905–1905)

Career statistics
Competition	First-class
Matches	86
Runs scored	1,523
Batting average	11.89
100s/50s	0/2
Top score	83
Balls bowled	5,209
Wickets	89
Bowling average	24.86
5 wickets in innings	4
10 wickets in match	0
Best bowling	6/36
Catches/stumpings	78/25
- Source: ESPNcricinfo, 15 February 2025

John Edward West (11 November 1861 – 14 March 1920) was an English cricket professional and cricket umpire. A member of Middlesex County Cricket Club for twelve seasons between 1885 and 1896, including during the first seven seasons of the County Championship, he played his first four seasons primarily as a specialist bowler who had occasional success as a batter, then was predominantly a wicket-keeper throughout the rest of his time as a player. Following his playing career, West became a full-time cricket umpire in the County Championship in 1901, serving in that role for eleven years with over 200 matches to his credit. He umpired a single Test cricket match in 1905. West also served as a groundskeeper at Lord's for two decades before dying at age 58 in London.

== Playing career ==
Born in Stepney, West debuted for Middlesex in 1885, starting a first-class career that would last twelve seasons. In his debut match, he took the wickets of Surrey captain John Shuter and William Roller, but failed to score a run in both innings. Shortly after, he was selected for the South of England cricket team for the annual North v South match, the first of three he would appear in. Highlights from his first season included a half-century against Gloucestershire and two five-wicket hauls, one against Surrey and another against Yorkshire. Over the whole year, he played in eleven matches, scoring 293 runs, ultimately his highest total for a single season, and recording 27 wickets. For his efforts, West earned a full-time job from Lord's as a groundskeeper.

In 1886, West took a career-best 36 wickets, including a personal high of six for 36 runs against Kent; his bowling average in county matches, under 18 for 22 wickets, was the lowest among Middlesex's regular bowlers. These results would coincide with his lowest batting average and fewest runs over a full season, 5.47 and 115 respectively. Following an 1887 season with 22 wickets taken and a shortened 1888 campaign that nevertheless featured West's highest score in an innings, 83 runs against Gloucestershire, West changed roles with Middlesex, becoming the team's wicket-keeper starting in 1889.

For the next three seasons, West played in ten matches each, with success in the field (37 catches and 24 stumpings) and modest batting averages that were in line with his career average. He was used less frequently after 1891, appearing in eight matches in 1892 and a combined total of nine to round out his playing career between 1893 and 1896. He ended his playing career with 1,523 runs as a batter and 89 wickets as a bowler.

== Umpiring career ==
While still playing, West umpired a handful of matches held at Lord's, Middlesex's home ground, that featured Marylebone Cricket Club (MCC). At the MCC's annual meeting in December 1900, West was selected to become a full-time umpire starting in 1901, a role he would hold for the next eleven years. Primarily working County Championship games, he stood in other matches at Lord's and also worked in the fourth Test match in the 1905 Ashes series, the only international match West would work. Overall, he would work over 200 matches before the MCC moved him to the reserve list for the 1912 season. His final first-class match as an umpire was the Champion County match of 1911, the third such match he had umpiring duty in.

== Honours and later life ==
During Whit Monday in 1904, Middlesex and Somerset played a County Championship match at Lord's whose proceeds went to West for his service to both Middlesex and the MCC. A second benefit match occurred in 1909 between Middlesex and Kent. He died on 14 March 1920 in London.
