= Charlin =

Charlin or Charlins may refer to:

- Charlin (name)
- Disques André Charlin (transl. Andre Charlin Records), a record label founded by André Charlin
- Os Charlins, a Galician criminal gang in Spain

== See also ==
- Carline (name)
- Charline (name)
- Charlene (disambiguation)
- Carlin (disambiguation)
- Carling (disambiguation)
- Karlin (disambiguation)
