= Carlini (surname) =

Carlini is an Italian surname. Notable people with this name include the following:

- Agostino Carlini (c. 1718 – 1790), Italian sculptor and painter
- Antonio Carlini (born 2001), Canadian soccer player
- Armando Carlini (1878–1959), Italian philosopher and author
- Benedetta Carlini (1591–1661), Catholic mystic and lesbian nun
- Francesco Carlini (1783–1862), Italian astronomer
- Giacomo Carlini (1904–1963), Italian sprinter, hurdler and a specialist in combined events
- John Carlini, American jazz guitarist and arranger
- Lauren Carlini (born 1995), American volleyball player
- Massimiliano Carlini (born 1986), Italian footballer
- Michel Carlini (1889–1955), French politician
- Paolo Carlini (1922–1979), Italian stage, television and film actor
- Uga Carlini, South African film director, writer and producer

== See also ==
- Carlini (disambiguation)
- Carlini (surname)
- Cârligi (disambiguation)
- Carlin (name)
- Carlina (name)
- Carline
- Carling (given name)
- Carlino (name)
- Carloni
