= Carlin =

Carlin may refer to:

== People ==
- George Carlin (1937–2008), comedian and social critic
- Carlin (name), including a list of people with the name

== Places ==
- 4121 Carlin, a main belt asteroid
- Carlin, Nevada, United States
- Carlin How, a village in northern England, UK
- Carlin Precinct, Calhoun County, Illinois, USA
- Carlin Tunnel, in Elko County, Nevada, USA
- Carlin Unconformity, a geological feature in Nevada notable as a gold mining area
- Delcambre Canal, in the U.S. state of Louisiana, also known as Bayou Carlin

== Other uses ==
- Carlin Act, legislation in the United States
- Carlin America, an independent music publishing conglomerate
- Carlin Motorsport, a motor racing team in the United Kingdom
- Carlin peas, consumed in northern England
- Carlin stone, in Scotland
- Pug, a breed of dog (also known as Carlin)

== See also ==
- Charlene (disambiguation)
- Charlin (disambiguation)
- Carling (disambiguation)
- Karlin (disambiguation)
- Carline (name)
- Carly (name), a feminine form of the given name Carlin
