= Cârlomănești =

Cârlomăneşti may refer to several places in Romania:

- Cârlomăneşti, a village in Vernești Commune, Buzău County
- Cârlomăneşti, a village in Cerțești Commune, Galați County

== See also ==
- Cârlomanu, a village in Teleorman County
- Cârlig (disambiguation)
