= Cârlig =

Cârlig may refer to several villages in Romania:

- Cârlig, a village in Popricani Commune, Iaşi County
- Cârlig, a village in Dulcești Commune, Neamţ County

== See also ==
- Carlie
- Cârligi (disambiguation)
- Cârligei (disambiguation)
- Cîrligați (disambiguation)
- Cârligu River (disambiguation)
- Cârligele River (disambiguation)
- Cârlomănești (disambiguation)
