= Curling (surname) =

Curling is a surname, and may refer to:

- Alvin Curling (born 1939), Canadian politician
- Dennis Curling, Welsh rugby union and rugby league player
- Henry Curling (1847–1910), British Army officer
- Rob Curling (born 1957), British television presenter and journalist
- Thomas Blizard Curling (1811–1888), British surgeon

== See also ==
- Curling
- Carling
