= David Carlin =

American politician (1938–2025)

David R. Carlin Jr. (April 9, 1938 – December 12, 2025) was an American politician, author and professor of sociology and philosophy.

== Life and career ==
Born in Pawtucket, Rhode Island, on April 9, 1938, Carlin resided in Newport from 1972 until his death. He was a Democratic majority leader of the Rhode Island Senate.

His total period of service in the State Senate ran from 1981 to 1993. He made an unsuccessful bid for the Rhode Island's 1st congressional district in 1992. In 2012, he made a bid to return to the Rhode Island legislature, but was decisively defeated in a Democratic primary for the Rhode Island House of Representatives. He remained a registered Democrat but was strongly opposed to abortion and same-sex marriage.

Carlin served 12 years on the Newport School Committee and was at one time the chair of the Newport Democratic Party.

He was the author of five books: The Decline and Fall of the Catholic Church in America (2003), Can a Catholic Be a Democrat? (2006), Homosexualism versus Catholicism (2012), My Dear Bishops: an Open Letter to the American Catholic Bishops (2013), and Three Sexual Revolutions: Catholic ~ Protestant ~ Atheist (2022). He was also an opinion columnist for two Catholic periodicals (Commonweal and Our Sunday Visitor) and two Catholic websites (Crisis and Aleteia).

Carlin was a full-time professor at the Community College of Rhode Island (CCRI) since 1984. He was a professor of sociology and philosophy at the Newport campus of CCRI.

Carlin died on December 12, 2025, at the age of 87.

== Views ==
=== Criticism of animal rights ===
Carlin criticized animal rights. He argued that animals are not equal to humans and thus to not deserve the same legal protection. He commented that the idea of animal rights is degrading to humans and negates the Christian view that man was created in the image and likeness of God.

=== Criticism of Equality Act ===
On June 11, 2019, Carlin attracted controversy when he authored an op-ed in The Providence Journal attacking the Equality Act as redundant given that the state already includes the LGBTQ community in its civil rights statutes, and in opposition to transgender athletes participating in sports on their chosen rather than biological identity, referring to them as the "weirdest members of society" and disruptive of sporting events and normal childhood development.
