= Charlene =

Charlene may refer to:

== People and fictional characters ==
- Charlene (given name), including a list of people and fictional characters with the given name Charlene or Charleen
- Charlene (singer), American singer Charlene D'Angelo (born 1950)

== Music ==
=== Albums ===
- Charlene (Charlene album), 1977
- Charlene (Tweet album), 2016

=== Songs ===
- "Charlene" (song), a 2003 song by Anthony Hamilton
- "Charlene", a 1959 song by Jerry Fuller
- "Charlene", a 1995 song by Björk, B-side of "Isobel"
- "Charlene (I'm Right Behind You)", a song by Stephen and the Colberts

== See also ==
- Charley (disambiguation)
- Charlie (disambiguation)
- Charlin (disambiguation)
- Charles (disambiguation)
- Charlot (disambiguation)
- Charlotte (disambiguation)
- Carlin (disambiguation)
- Karlin (disambiguation)
