= Giancarlo Carloni =

Italian footballer

Personal information
- Date of birth: 8 June 1947 (age 79)
- Place of birth: Civita Castellana, Italy
- Height: 1.72 m (5 ft 7 1/2 in)
- Position: Defender

Senior career*
Years	Team	Apps	(Gls)
1966–1969	Roma	1	(0)
1969–1970	Ternana	0	(0)
1970–1972	Del Duca Ascoli	28	(?)
1972–1973	Giulianova	30	(0)
1973–1974	Frosinone	33	(0)
1974–1975	Grosseto	23	(0)
1975–1978	Campobasso	100	(0)
1978–1979	Messina	17	(0)
- * Club domestic league appearances and goals

Giancarlo Carloni (born 8 June 1947 in Civita Castellana) is an Italian former professional footballer. His professional debut in the 1966–67 season for AS Roma remained the only Serie A game in his career.
