= Walter Brearley =

English cricketer

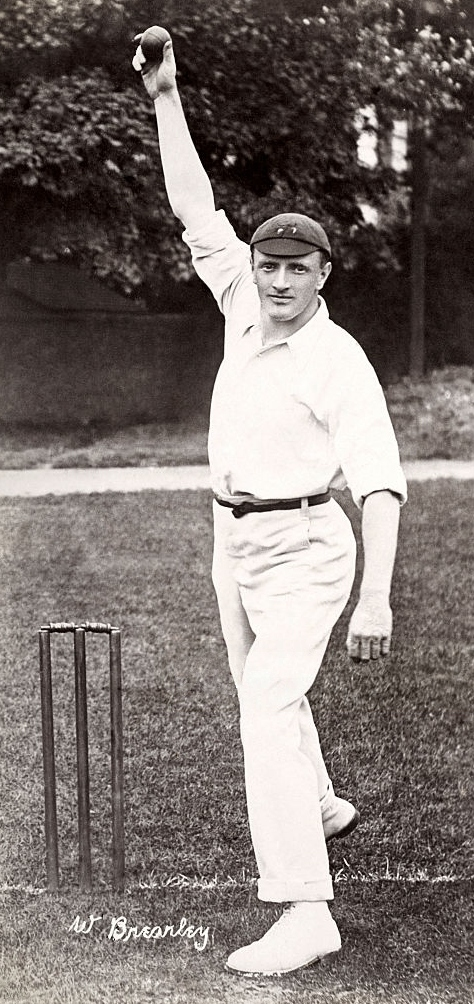
- Brearley in about 1908

Personal information
- Born: 11 March 1876; Bolton, Lancashire
- Died: 30 January 1937 (aged 60); Middlesex Hospital, Marylebone, London
- Batting: Right-handed
- Bowling: Right-arm fast

International information
- National side: England
- Test debut: 24 July 1905 v Australia
- Last Test: 10 June 1912 v South Africa

Career statistics
Competition	Test	First-class
Matches	4	134
Runs scored	21	908
Batting average	7.00	5.89
100s/50s	0/0	0/0
Top score	11*	38
Balls bowled	705	29,536
Wickets	17	844
Bowling average	21.11	19.31
5 wickets in innings	1	93
10 wickets in match	0	27
Best bowling	5/110	9/47
Catches/stumpings	0/–	52/–
- Source: CricInfo, 6 November 2022

Walter Brearley (11 March 1876 – 30 January 1937) was an English first-class cricketer who played for Lancashire and England.

Brearley was a fast bowler with what Wisden described as "a rolling gait" who put his full – and substantial – weight into achieving pace and swing. He played county cricket only from the age of 26, but his ability to make the ball rise sharply on the somewhat fiery Old Trafford wickets became noticed the following year, but after the wickets became less difficult he was dropped from the side. The following year, his bowling was a valuable part of Lancashire's finest season in county cricket (sixteen wins and no losses) but his inability to play late in the season attracted the notice of Wisden.

The following year, he improved even further – at times bowling well even on wickets too dead to suit a fast bowler. A display of pace and length against Somerset at Old Trafford made him an automatic choice for the Test team for the Fourth Test against Australia. He took four wickets in each innings, and in the final match of the series at The Oval took six out of the 14 wickets to fall, including five for 110 runs in the first innings. In all cricket that season, he took the wicket of Victor Trumper six times and finished with an aggregate of 181 wickets for 19.25 each. His tremendous stamina and ability to maintain his fastest pace through even the longest spells of bowling was described as "nothing short of remarkable" by the 1906 Wisden.

However, having established himself as one of the leading fast bowlers in the world, at the end of the season Brearley announced that business claims would prevent him playing again. Although he changed his mind and did play five times for Lancashire in 1906 besides helping Neville Knox to form a remarkably hostile attack for the Gentlemen at Lord's, he refused to play again for his county until 1908. In 1907, Brearley only played a handful of first-class games for the Gentlemen and a couple of privately raised teams, but was still thought good enough to only just miss out on a Test place at Lord's against South Africa. 1908 saw Brearley end his dispute with the Lancashire committee and bowl superbly before business kept him out of most of the August matches. He took 148 wickets in just seventeen matches and was named a Cricketer of the Year by Wisden. In 1909 he performed well so long as he could play, but failed in his only Test, and in the following two years business and a major accident limited him to just fourteen of Lancashire's fifty eight Championship games.

The following year, Brearley's rift with the Lancashire committee became irreconcilable and at the beginning of 1912 it was clear he would play no county cricket. However, so well-thought of was he that, playing when business allowed for Cheshire in the Minor Counties competition, Brearley played one further Test but the wicket was too soft for him to get a foothold.

Even at the height of his career, Brearley could never go on an overseas tour owing to business commitments.

Brearley made one late first-class appearance in 1921 at the age of 45 when he was picked for Archie MacLaren's amateur team that took on, and beat, Warwick Armstrong's unbeaten Australian touring team. Brearley's own contribution was modest: he scored one run and did not bowl.

A wholehearted cricketer who threw himself energetically into everything he did, Brearley was best known for his hurried walk to the wicket. A much-repeated story from Old Trafford relates that, at the sound of him scurrying to the crease, the horse would walk between the shafts of the heavy roller in readiness for the end of the innings. In his entire first-class career, he took 844 wickets but scored only 908 runs.

Neville Cardus wrote "Every ball was a crisis as far as Brealey was concerned".

Brearley maintained faith in his ability long after his retirement. When watching new fast bowlers in later years Brearley was often heard to exclaim that he could still 'throw his hat faster'.
