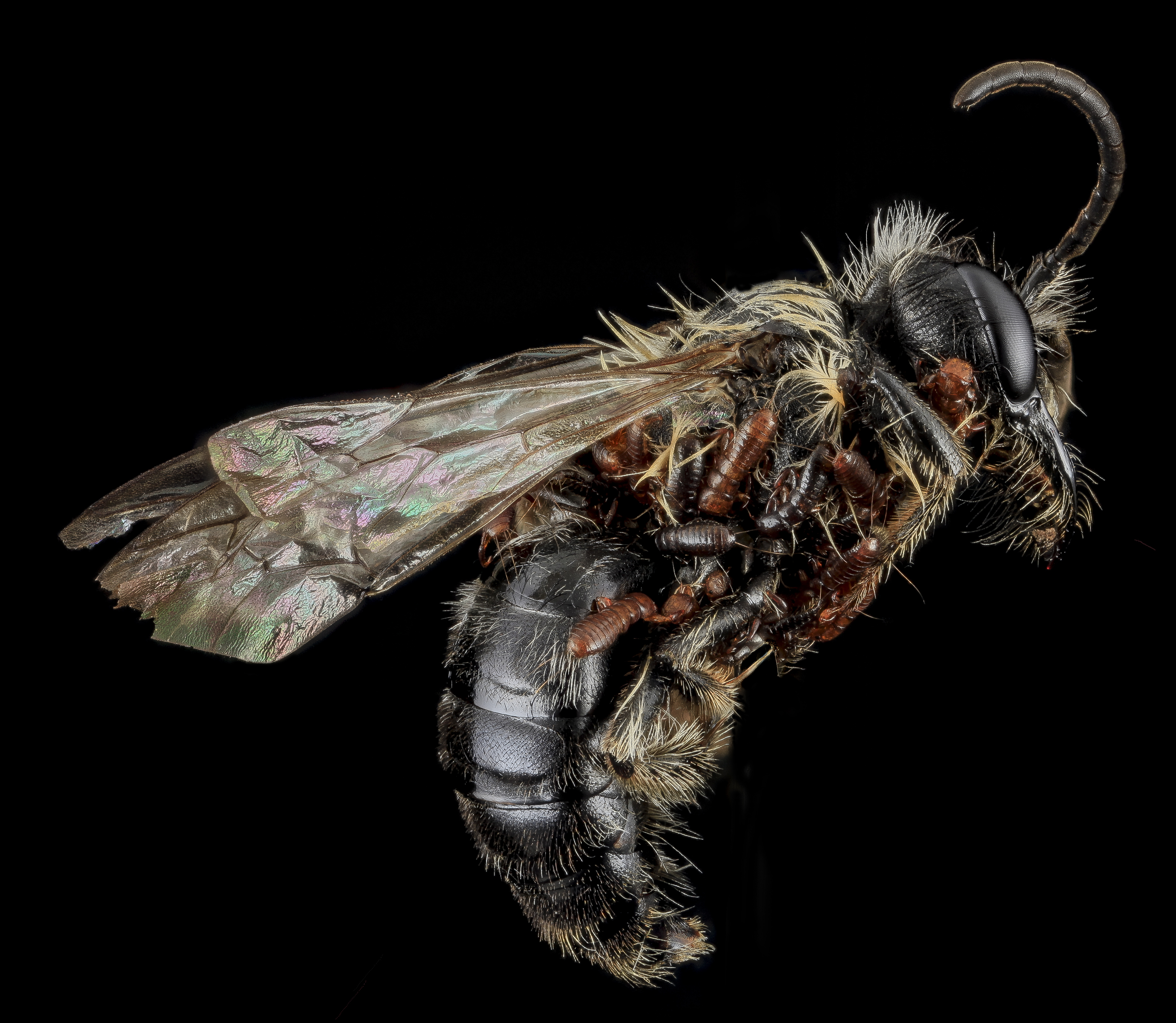

Scientific classification
- Kingdom: Animalia
- Phylum: Arthropoda
- Class: Insecta
- Order: Hymenoptera
- Family: Andrenidae
- Genus: Andrena
- Species: A. carlini

Binomial name
- Andrena carlini Cockerell, 1901

= Andrena carlini =

Species of bee

Andrena carlini, the Carlinville miner bee, is a species of miner bee in the family Andrenidae. It is found in North America.
