= Sydney Carlin =

Sydney Carlin may refer to:

- Sydney Carlin (politician) (born 1944), American politician
- Sydney Carlin (RAF officer) (1889–1941), British pilot
