= Leg curl =

Exercise for the hamstrings

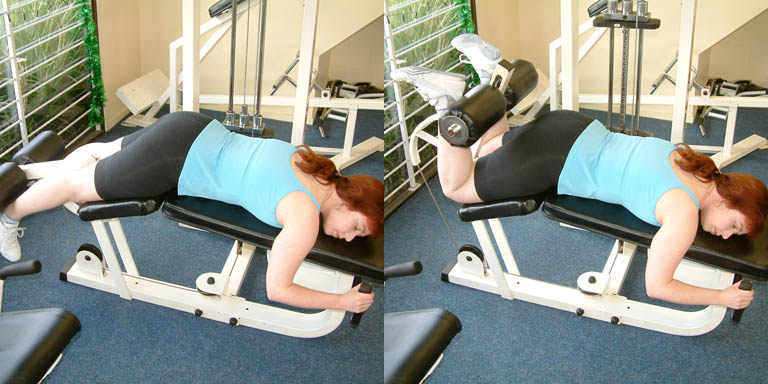
Lying leg curl

The leg curl, also known as hamstring curl, is an isolation exercise that targets the hamstring muscles. The exercise involves flexing the lower leg against resistance towards the buttocks. There are three types of leg curls. There are seated leg curls, lying leg curls, and standing leg curls.

Other exercises that can be used to strengthen the hamstrings include the glute-ham raise and the deadlift. However unlike the deadlift, the leg curl targets all 4 heads of the hamstrings as the biceps femorus head does not cross the hip joint and can only bend the knee. Because the deadlift is a hip-hinge movement, it does not target this head.

Some evidence points to the seated leg curl producing a greater increase in hamstrings muscle size than the prone version, due to training at a longer muscle length which may promote superior muscle hypertrophy.

Video of using the leg curl machine

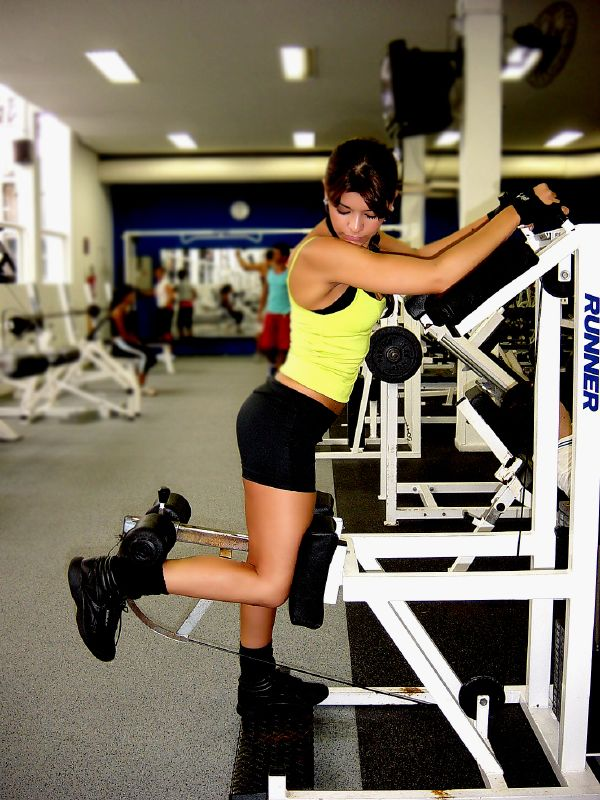
Standing leg curl at the finishing phase

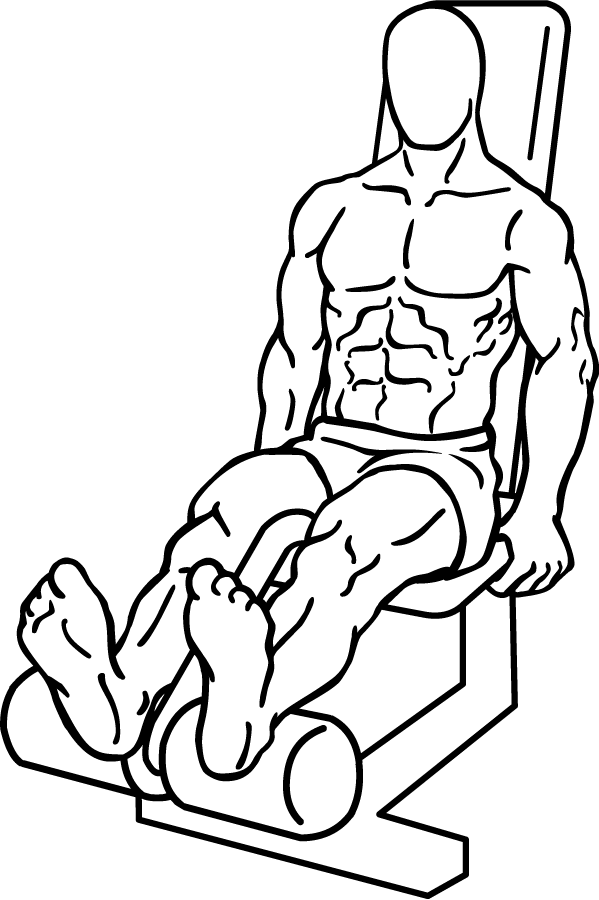
Seated leg curl at starting phase

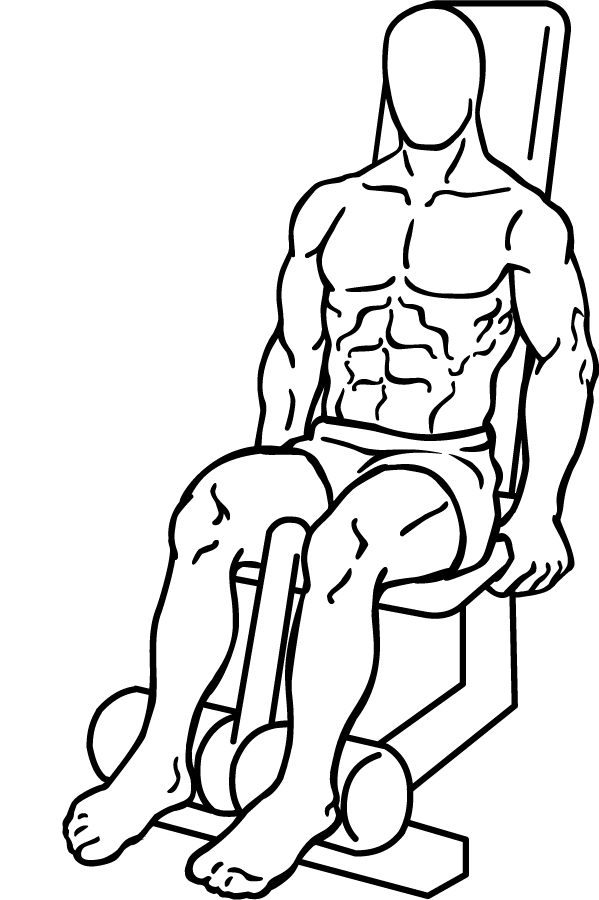
Seated leg curl at finishing phase

== See also ==
- Nordic hamstring curl
