= Martina Gangle Curl =

American artist and activist

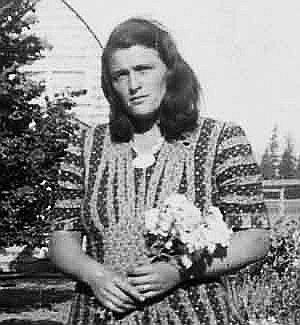
- Born: December 21, 1906
- Died: February 20, 1994 (aged 87)
- Education: Pacific Northwest College of Art
- Known for: printmaking, painting, sculpting
- Movement: Modernism

Martina Gangle Curl (December 21, 1906 – February 20, 1994) was an American artist and activist. Her murals, prints, and social activism highlighted labor rights in the United States.

== Early life and education ==
Martina Gangle Curl, born December 1906 in Woodland, Washington, was one of seven children. Born into a migrant family of Austrian and Swedish descent, Curl grew up in poverty and began work as a fruit-picker at the age of eight. She attended a small country school until 1920, when she moved to the Lents district of southeast Portland to live with her grandmother. While living with her grandmother she attended Franklin High School where she excelled in math and physics. During her high school career Curl worked part-time as a housekeeper for a local family, who encouraged her to expand her knowledge through literature. Martina started to keep a dictionary which she used to look up unfamiliar words, and avidly read Charles Dickens and Greek dramas. After Curl graduated in 1924, she received a $200 loan from her employer to use towards her education. She spent a year teaching at Western Oregon University (formerly the Oregon Normal School), and afterwards worked as an elementary school instructor in Portland.

Curl stopped teaching in 1926 after giving birth to her son, David, and the father abandoned them shortly after. Desperate for money, Curl spent the next four years working at a boarding house in southeast Portland. She received $35 a month and a bed on the back porch for herself and her baby. In 1931, she used what little savings she had accumulated plus a personal loan to enroll in the Museum Art School.

When Curl started attending the University, she found herself unable to relate to her peers. While she grew up in a working-class family, many of her classmates came from upper-class backgrounds. However, she found solace from her professor and fellow painter Harry Wentz. He encouraged her to paint more expressively, and helped her receive a two-year scholarship to complete college.

While in college, Curl became more aware of the wide class differences between her and her more affluent classmates. Within her first year attending the school, she came across a group of demonstrators. They gave her a pamphlet recruiting people for the communist party and introduced her to the idea of socialism. As an impoverished art student living in the era of the Great Depression, Curl hoped socialism would allow her to make a living in the vocation she loved. By 1936 she joined the communist party, and applied for a position with the Federal Arts Project which started her professional artistic career.

== Career ==
Curl gained a reputation for her social activism. She was arrested several times throughout her life, as she often partook in protests and demonstrations which landed her in jail. By the late 1930s her artwork became increasingly focused on her political views. She advocated for workers rights, and believed socialism bridged the gap between the Christian ideals she had been taught as a child and the reality of capitalism.

== Artworks ==
Known for her modernist approach to art, Curl often made prints using a western woodcut style. Her work received a mixed reception. While she gained fame in the late 1930s due to her association with other artists and activists, she believed her radicalism prevented her from attaining more mainstream success. Her art usually reflected the daily life of the working class, women, and life in migrant camps.

=== Major exhibitions ===
Oregon Art Guild exhibition in 1948.

=== Public collections ===
- Portland Art Museum
- Oregon Historical Society
- Timberline Lodge
- University of Oregon
- Oregon Society of Artists
- Museum of People's Art
- Hallie Ford Museum
