= Carmina Belmonte =

Spanish politician

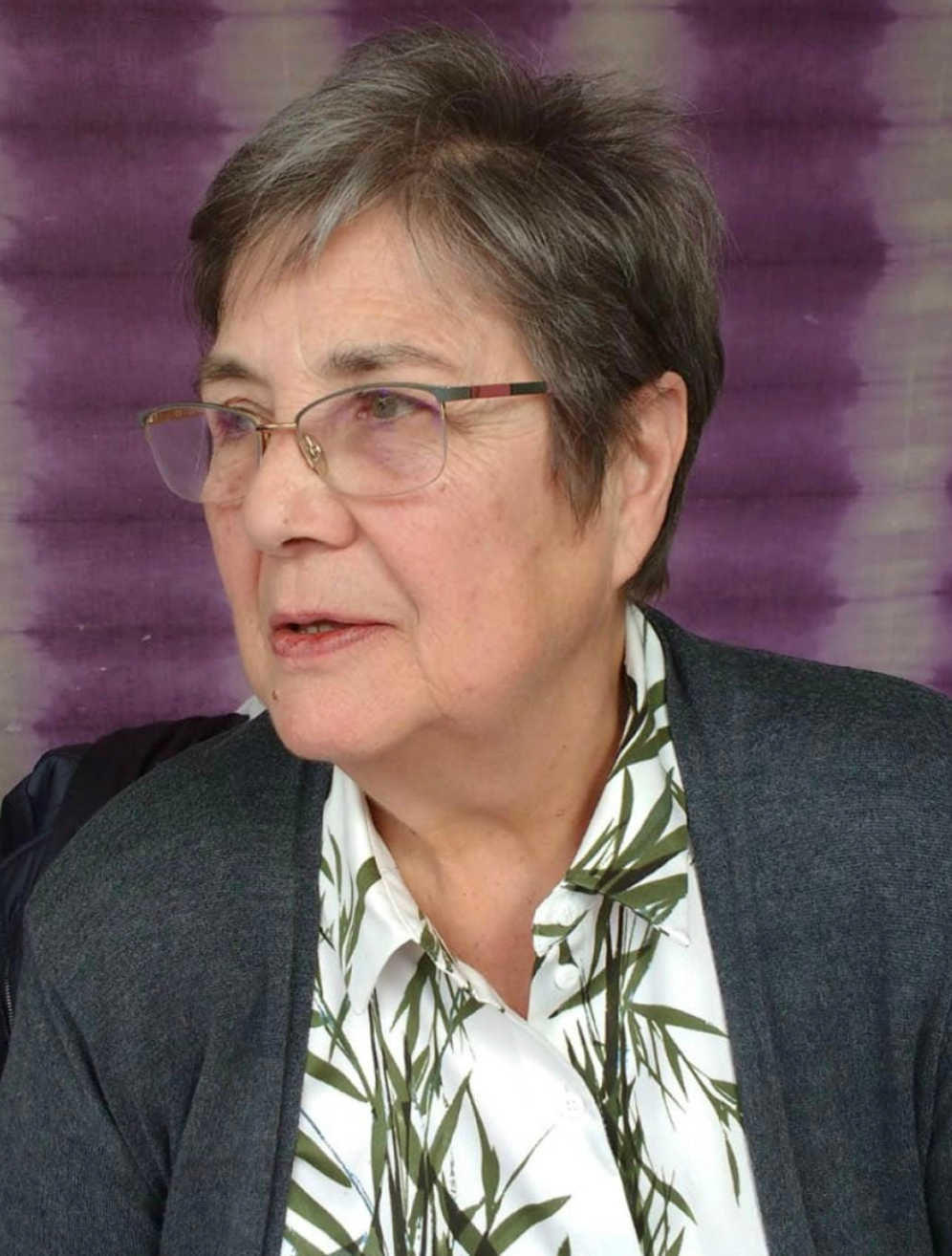

Carmen "Carmina" Belmonte Useros (born 1950) is a Spanish academic and former politician. As a member of the Spanish Socialist Workers' Party (PSOE), she was the mayor of Albacete from 1991 to 1995, the first democratically elected woman mayor of a provincial capital in Spain.

== Biography ==
Belmonte was born in Albacete in Castilla–La Mancha. Her mother was the ethnologist Carmina Useros and her sister was the soprano Elisa Belmonte. She studied philosophy at the University of Valencia and gained a doctorate in pedagogy. She taught in Hellín and Albacete, and in 1988 was given the office of professor at the Facultad de Educación de Albacete within the University of Castilla–La Mancha. As of 2025, she was professor of French philology. She has two daughters.

During the Spanish transition to democracy, Belmonte had been a member of the People's Socialist Party (PSP). In the 1991 Spanish local elections, she stood as an independent candidate at the top of the Spanish Socialist Workers' Party (PSOE) list for Albacete, winning with 14 seats against the 10 from the People's Party. For the first time, the PSOE held the mayor's office in all five provincial capitals in Castilla–La Mancha. During her mandate, Belmonte introduced a councillor responsible for women's affairs.

Numerous sources describe Belmonte as the first woman elected as mayor of a provincial capital: prior to democratic elections, Eloína Suárez became mayor of Oviedo in 1978 due to a resignation, and Clementina Ródenas became mayor of Valencia in 1989 due to the resignation of Ricard Pérez Casado. In the same 1991 elections, Rita Barberá became mayor of Valencia and Blanca Calvo Alonso-Cortés mayor of Guadalajara, but their inaugurations were delayed by the need to form coalition governments in those city halls.
