= Biarticular muscle =

Muscles which cross two joints in a series

Biarticular muscles are muscles that cross two joints rather than just one, such as the hamstrings which cross both the hip and the knee. The function of these muscles is complex and often depends upon both their anatomy and the activity of other muscles at the joints in question. Their role in movement is poorly understood.

== Anatomy ==
Biarticular muscles cross two joints in series, usually in a limb. The details of the origin (proximal attachment) and insertion (distal attachment) can play a large role in determining muscle function. For instance, the human gastrocnemius technically spans both the knee and ankle joints. However, the origin point of the muscle is so close to the axis of rotation of the knee joint that the muscle's effective lever arm would be very small, especially compared to its large lever arm at the ankle. As a result, even though it spans two joints, the strong bias in lever arms allows it to function primarily as an ankle plantar flexor. Other muscles, such as the hamstrings, do not display such biases, so their function is not immediately evident from anatomy alone. Another important concept of biarticular muscles (consider the rectus femoris muscle for this example) is the change in muscle length when motion at the proximal and distal ends of the muscle is happening. For example, in the propulsive phase of a jump, the thigh is extended at the coxal joint, and the shank (lower leg) is extended at the tibiofemoral joint. These joint positions cause the rectus femoris muscle to remain unchanged in net length, because the proximal (Eccentric action) and distal (concentric action) attachments are contradicting one another.

== Function ==
Biarticular muscles can fulfill a range of functions during movement. By contracting isometrically (without changing length), they put the joint into a four-bar linkage, allowing the contraction of muscles at one joint to move the other by a fixed amount. Unlike four-bar linkages in which all elements are bone and angle relationships are fixed by the relative bone lengths, the biarticular muscle can hold the joint at many different lengths, creating a range of four-bar properties as needed.

Biarticular muscles can also transfer mechanical power between distal and proximal joints, though the direction and magnitude of this transfer varies with anatomy, muscle activity level, and joint angles. This is a crucial consideration when analyzing an organism's movement using inverse dynamics.
