= Dave Carlin =

American politician

Dave Carlin is chairman of the College of DuPage Board of Trustees, former Republican candidate for state representative in Illinois' 48th district, former Illinois Republican Party deputy executive director, and former executive director of the DuPage Republican Party. He is currently the district director for Congressman Joe Walsh of the 8th Congressional District. He is also the president of DC Consulting, a local political consulting firm.

== 2008 Illinois House candidacy ==
In his 2008 House race, Carlin squared off against Michael Connelly, a DuPage County Board member and Doug Krause, a 19-year Naperville, Illinois city council member.

== 2012 Illinois House candidacy ==
Carlin filed for candidacy in the newly drawn 42nd House District for the 2012 Republican primary.

== Personal life ==
Currently, Carlin resides in Naperville and serves as a Republican precinct committeeman in Lisle Township, Illinois. He is married and with his wife have 4 kids as of 2026, two sons, and two daughters.
