= Carmiña Londoño =

Director of the National Science Foundation

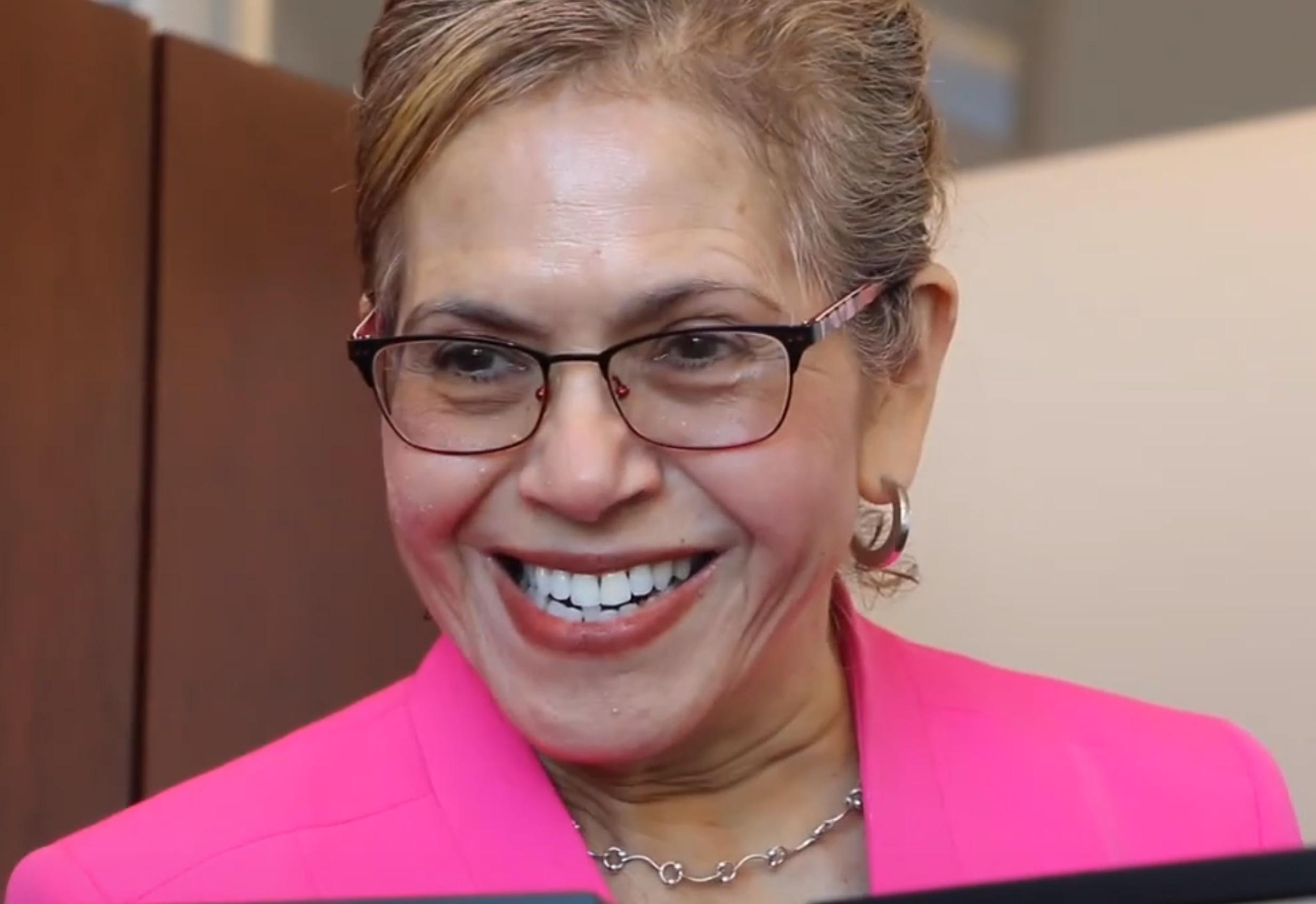
- Carmiña Londoño in "Women's History Makers" Science360 video, 2019
- Born: Colombia
- Education: University of Massachusetts Lowell (BS); University of Arizona (MS); Tufts University (PhD)
- Scientific career
- Workplaces: United States House Committee on Science, Space, and Technology; Polaroid Corporation; National Science Foundation

Carmiña Londoño is the former Deputy Division Director of the Electrical Communications and Cybersystems Division at the National Science Foundation. She previously spent 13 years at the National Institute of Standards and Technology, where she led the Global Standards and Information Group. Londoño spent two terms on the Board of Directors of SPIE, and the SPIE's Director's Award in 2019.

== Early life and education ==
Londoño was born in Colombia. She moved to the United States at the age of 13, and grew up in Lowell, Massachusetts. Her parents were passionate about her education, and encouraged her and her sisters to become engineers. During high school Londoño competed in science fairs. She visited the Kennedy Space Center as a child, and became interested in space physics. She eventually studied physics at the University of Massachusetts Lowell. During her summer holidays she worked at Itek in Lexington, Massachusetts. Her work included ultra-lightweight mirrors and trying to mitigate the degradation of image quality arising from intercellular deflections. She earned her master's degree in optics at the University of Arizona in 1982. Her Master's dissertation considered techniques to measure the radius of curvature of off-axis parabolas.

== Research and career ==
After completing her MS degree at the Optical Sciences Center at the University of Arizona, Carmiña Londoño returned to Massachusetts, where she joined the Avco-Everett Research Laboratory to work with Ralph Berggren and Dan Trainor on the lens design and building of diffraction limited optical resonators for high-energy excimer lasers for the Strategic Defense Initiative. After finishing her work at Avco, Carmiña Londoño joined the Polaroid Corporation to work with Peter Clark and William Plummer on the optical design and testing of novel optical systems for medical applications, consumer products (cameras, CD players) and large quantity molded optical elements for original equipment manufacturers. She co-designed the optics for a medical printer that wrote digital half-tone images with four multi-mode diode lasers on a Polaroid proprietary and unique high-resolution binary film for ultrasound and x-ray applications. While at Polaroid under the guidance of William Plummer, Carmiña Londoño completed her PhD at the Tufts University Electro-Optics Technology Center. Her research focused on the mathematical modeling, design and fabrication of diffractive optical elements for optical athermalization and achromatization. She received a U.S. patent for this work and Polaroid subsequently incorporated this technology in a consumer camera.

In 1994 Londoño was selected as a Congressional Science Fellow, supported by the American Institute of Physics. She worked as a technical advisor for the United States House Committee on Science, Space, and Technology, working for James Turner. Subsequently, she joined the National Institute of Standards and Technology in 1995, where she spent thirteen years. She was the Group Leader for the Global Standards and Information Group which provided technical & policy support for standards & metrology to the private sector and to U.S. government agencies. Her group had responsibility for the Standards in Trade Workshop Program, that trained over 2,000 foreign participants in US metrology and standardization. Londoño was the official NIST representative to the International Standardization Organization on Developing Country Matters addressing the metrology and standardization needs of developing countries.

In 2008 Londoño joined the National Science Foundation as a Program Director in the NSF Office of International Science and Engineering having programmatic responsibility for a multidisciplinary set of scientific collaborations with South America. In 2011, she was transferred to the Division of Materials Research to co-manage the Materials World Network Program. In 2012, Londoño joined the Engineering Research Centers, which funds interdisciplinary, multi-institutional teams from academia, industry, and government in partnership to produce transformational engineered systems with strong societal impact along with engineering graduates who are adept at innovation and leadership in the global economy. Londoño is a member of the U.S. Federal Government Senior Executive Service with 30 years of experience that include: leading people, strategic planning, program management, project development, research administration, program evaluation, international collaboration, public speaking, and optical design and engineering in the private sector. From 2019 to 2023 she served as the Deputy Division Director of the Electrical, Communications and Cyber Systems Division ECCS in the NSF Engineering Directorate. In March 2023, she retired from the NSF and is presently advancing several projects and initiatives with two photonics professional societies (the IEEE Photonics Society and the SPIE).

=== Academic service ===
Carmiña Londoño is a Fellow of the SPIE, and spent two terms serving on the SPIE's board of directors. She co-founded the SPIE's Women in Optics Committee, and was featured in their 2005 Women in Optics planner. In 2019 she was awarded the SPIE Directors' Award for her outstanding commitment to the society. In 2017, the University of Massachusetts Lowell awarded her the Physics Alumnus of the Year Award.

Carmiña is passionate about improving access to optics and physics careers to children and young professionals. She volunteered through an international volunteer organization called Outreach360, where she visited the Dominican Republic and Nicaragua to conduct optics and science camps. These programs are intended to enhance the education of underserved children in Latin America. She is presently working closely with Drs. Angeles Camacho and Natalia Cañas Estrada on the Iluminando el Futuro STEM initiative supported by the IEEE Photonics Society to train and support a cadre of STEM ambassadors throughout Latin America.

== Personal life ==
Carmiña Londoño is married to Joseph Kopanski, Group Leader of the Nanoscale Imaging Group at the National Institute of Standards and Technology. She has one daughter, Lillian Lahti.
