= Nordic hamstring curl =

Exercise for the hamstrings

The Nordic hamstring curl (NHC) is an exercise in which a person kneels with their feet fixed in position and lowers their body by extending the knee. It reduces hamstring injuries in athletes, and is commonly used as a form of injury prevention. NHC increases strength of the hamstrings and length of the fascia, sprint speed, and change of direction ability. It is debated whether NHC is an open or closed chain exercise. NHC has been compared to the razor hamstring curl.

Variations of the Nordic hamstring curl are commonly used to scale the exercise for athletes with different strength levels. Assisted versions—such as using resistance bands, elevated pads, or partner support—reduce the eccentric load and allow beginners to perform the movement with proper technique. These regressions are often used as a progression model in strength and conditioning programs to gradually increase hamstring eccentric strength.

== See also ==
- Leg curl
