= Leo Carlin =

Ticket Manager (1937–2024)

Profile
- Position: Ticket manager

Personal information
- Born: September 16, 1937; Philadelphia, Pennsylvania, U.S.
- Died: January 17, 2024 (aged 86)

Career history
- Philadelphia Eagles (1960–1982); Philadelphia Stars (1983–1984); Philadelphia Eagles (1985–2015)

Leo Carlin (September 16, 1937 – January 17, 2024) was the Philadelphia Eagles’ ticket manager for 53 years. At first, he was only a part-time ticket office employee, starting his career in 1960, the year the Eagles won the 1960 NFL Championship Game. He was later promoted to be the ticket manager in 1964, and he remained the manager until 1983 when he left. He then got a job as the ticket manager for the Philadelphia Stars of the USFL. Soon after, he left the Stars and returned to the Eagles in 1985. In 2007, he was a nominee for the Pro Football Hall of Fame as a pioneer in the sports ticket industry. He was inducted into the Philadelphia Eagles Hall of Fame in 2012. He retired in 2015 after 55 years in the sport ticket industry; 53 of which had been spent working for the Eagles.

Carlin died on January 17, 2024, at the age of 86.
