= Hamstring =

Human leg muscle

- Rotating view of the hamstring muscles

Details
- Origin: tuberosity of the ischium, linea aspera
- Insertion: tibia, fibula
- Artery: inferior gluteal artery, profunda femoris artery
- Nerve: sciatic nerve (tibial nerve and common fibular nerve)
- Actions: flexion of knee, extension of hip
- Antagonist: Rectus femoris muscle

Identifiers
- MeSH: D000070633

A hamstring (/ˈhæmstrɪŋ/) is any one of the three posterior thigh muscles in human anatomy between the hip and the knee: from medial to lateral, the semimembranosus, semitendinosus and biceps femoris.

== Etymology ==
The word "ham" is derived from the Old English “ham” or “hom” meaning the hollow or bend of the knee, from a Germanic base where it meant "crooked". It gained the meaning of the leg of an animal around the 15th century. String refers to tendons, and thus the hamstrings' string-like tendons felt on either side of the back of the knee.

== Definition ==
The common definition of hamstring muscles:

1. Muscles originate from ischial tuberosity.
2. Muscles are inserted over the knee joint, in the tibia or in the fibula.
3. Muscles are innervated by the tibial branch of the sciatic nerve.
4. Muscles participate in flexion of the knee joint and extension of the hip joint.

Those muscles which fulfill all of the four criteria are considered true hamstrings.
The adductor magnus reaches only up to the adductor tubercle of the femur, but it is included amongst the hamstrings because the tibial collateral ligament of the knee joint morphologically is the degenerated tendon of this muscle. The ligament is attached to the medial epicondyle, two millimeters from the adductor tubercle.

== Structure ==
The three muscles of the posterior thigh (semitendinosus, semimembranosus, biceps femoris) flex (bend) the knee, while all but the biceps femoris extend (straighten) the hip. The three 'true' hamstrings cross both the hip and the knee joint and are therefore involved in knee flexion and hip extension. The short head of the biceps femoris crosses only one joint (knee) and is therefore not involved in hip extension. With its divergent origin and innervation, it is sometimes excluded from the 'hamstring' characterization.

Muscle	Origin	Insertion	Nerve
semitendinosus	ischial tuberosity	medial surface of tibia	tibial part of sciatic
semimembranosus	ischial tuberosity	medial tibial condyle	tibial part of sciatic
biceps femoris - long head	ischial tuberosity	lateral side of the head of the fibula	tibial part of sciatic
biceps femoris - short head	linea aspera and lateral supracondylar line of femur	lateral side of the head of the fibula (common tendon with the long head)	common peroneal

A portion of the adductor magnus is sometimes considered a part of the hamstrings.

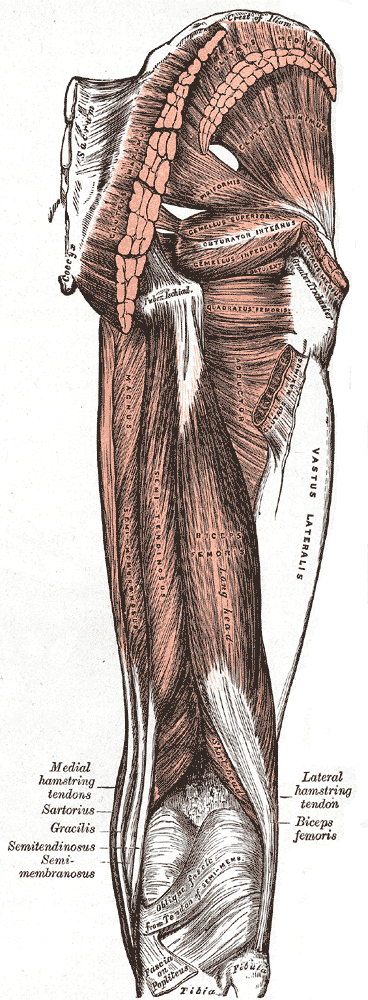
Biceps femoris, semitendinosus and semimembranosus muscles of the right leg

== Function ==
The hamstrings cross and act upon two joints – the hip and the knee – and as such they are termed biarticular muscles. The hamstrings contract when the knee is bent or when the hips are extended, and they lengthen when the knee is extended.

Semitendinosus and semimembranosus extend the hip when the trunk is fixed; they also flex the knee and medially (inwardly) rotate the lower leg when the knee is bent.

The long head of the biceps femoris extends the hip, as when beginning to walk; both short and long heads flex the knee and laterally (outwardly) rotate the lower leg when the knee is bent.

The hamstrings play a crucial role in many daily activities such as walking, running, jumping, and controlling some movement in the gluteus. In walking, they are most important as an antagonist to the quadriceps in the deceleration of knee extension.

== Clinical significance ==
=== Sports running injuries ===
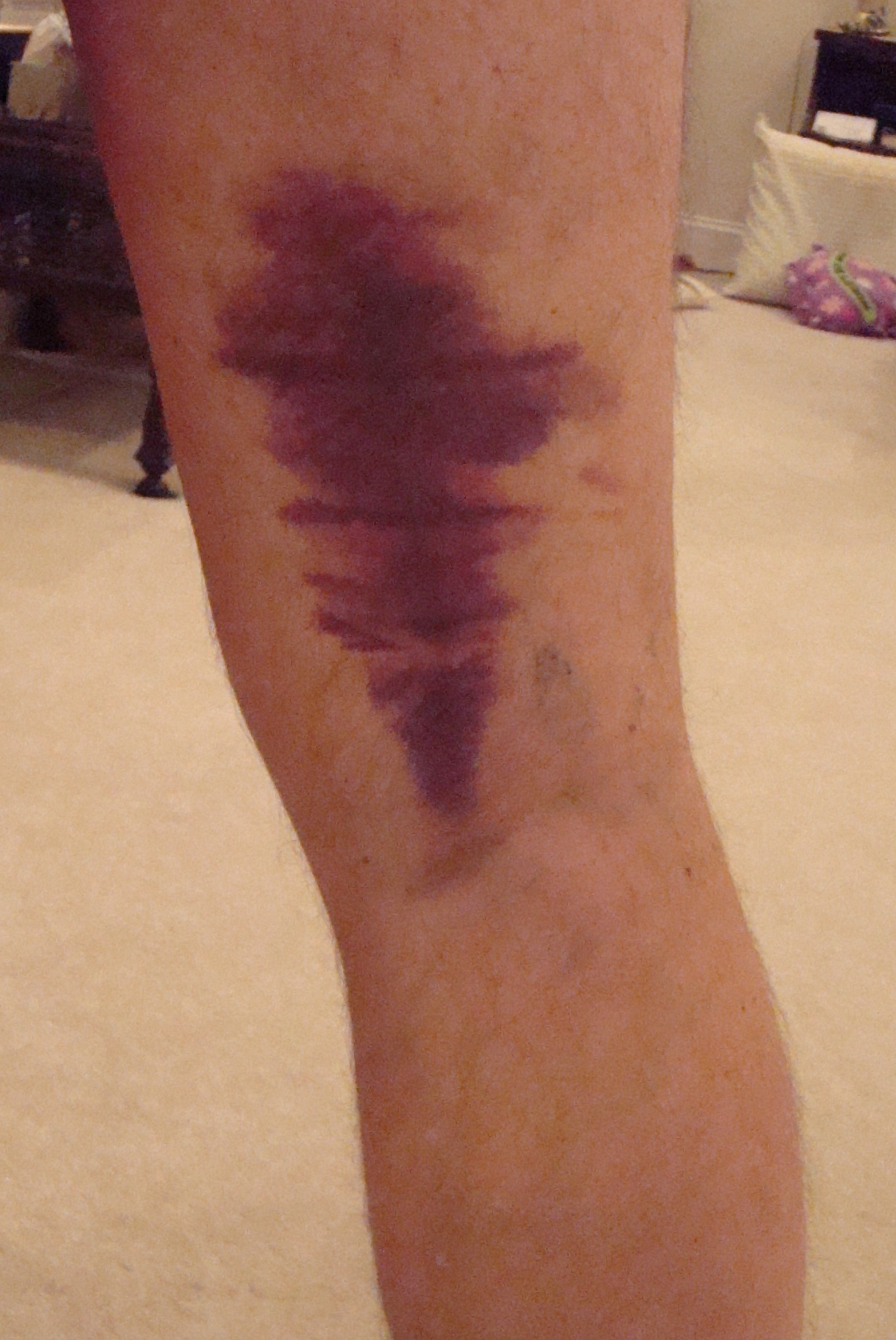
A torn hamstring in the right thigh

A common running injury in several sports, excessive stretch of a hamstring results from extensive hip flexion while the knee is extended. During sprinting, a hamstring injury may occur from excessive muscle strain during eccentric contraction late in the leg swing phase. The overall incidence of a hamstring injury in sports and professional dancers is about two per 1000 hours of performance. In some sports, a hamstring injury occurs at the incidence of 19% of all sports injuries, and results in an average time loss from competition of 24 days.

=== Imaging ===
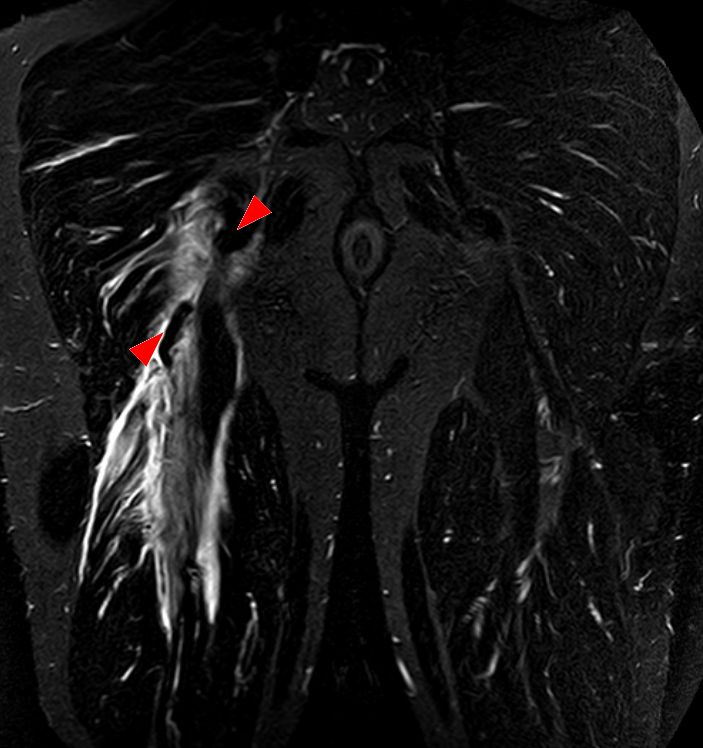
Tear of the hamstrings muscles at the ischial tuberosity seen on MRI (visible on a coronal STIR MRI sequence). The arrowheads indicate the tuber and the retracted tendon stump. Significant bleeding around and into the muscles.

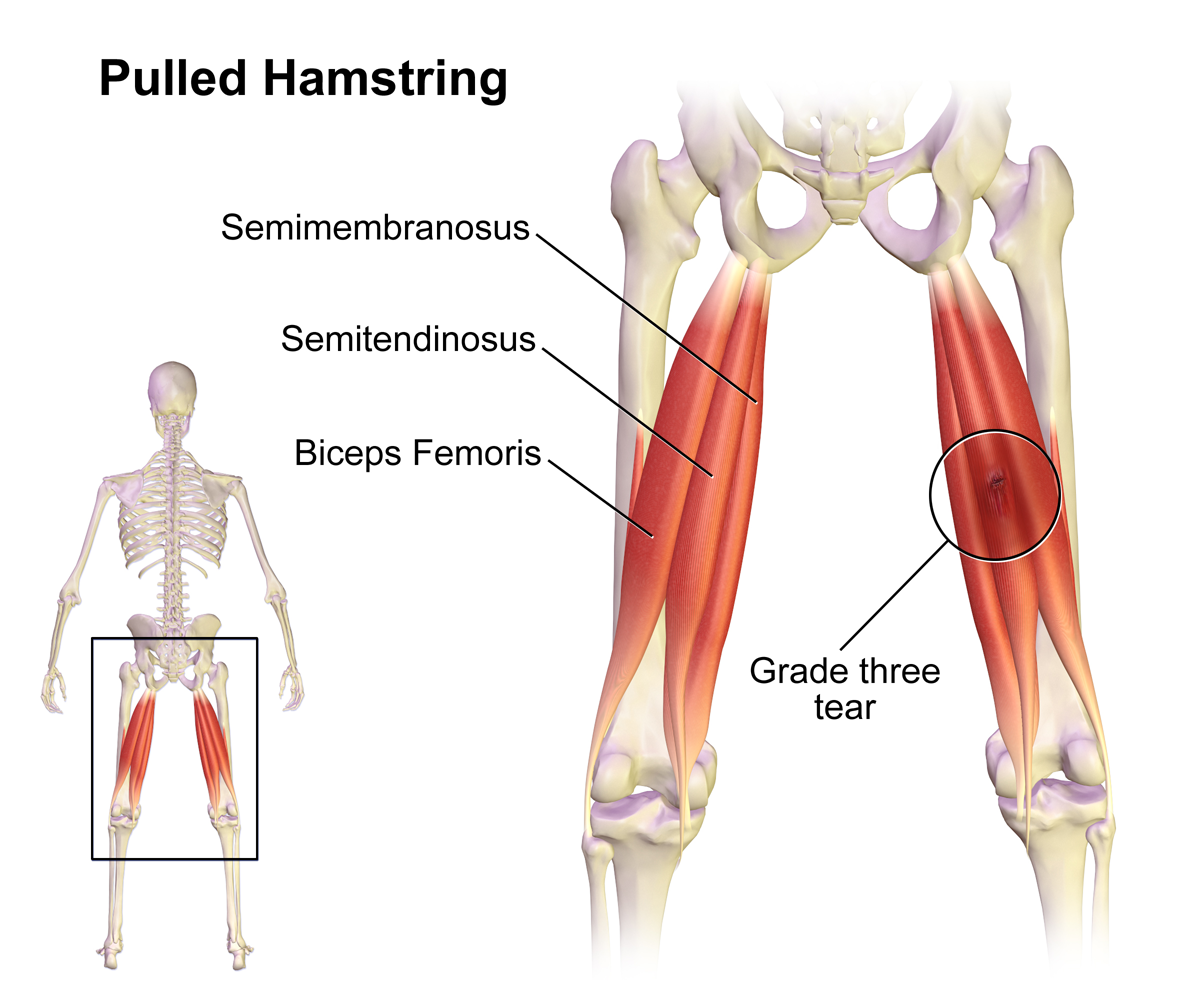
The location of a pulled hamstring

Imaging the hamstring muscles is usually performed with an ultrasound and/or MRI. The biceps femoris is most commonly injured, followed by semitendinosus. Semimembranosus injury is rare. Imaging is useful in differentiating the grade of strain, especially if the muscle is completely torn. In this setting, the level and degree of retraction can be determined, serving as a useful roadmap prior to any surgery. Those with a hamstring strain of greater than 60 mm (2.4 in) in length have a greater risk of recurrence.

=== Use in surgery ===
The distal semitendinosus tendon is one of the tendons that can be used in the surgical procedure ACL reconstruction. In this procedure, a piece of it is used to replace the anterior cruciate ligament (ACL). The ACL is one of the four major ligaments in the knee, which also include the posterior cruciate ligament (PCL), medial collateral ligament (MCL), and lateral collateral ligament (LCL).

== See also ==
- Hamstringing
- Hamstring curl
- Lombard's paradox
- Popliteal fossa
- Pulled hamstring
