= Carmina Useros =

Spanish painter

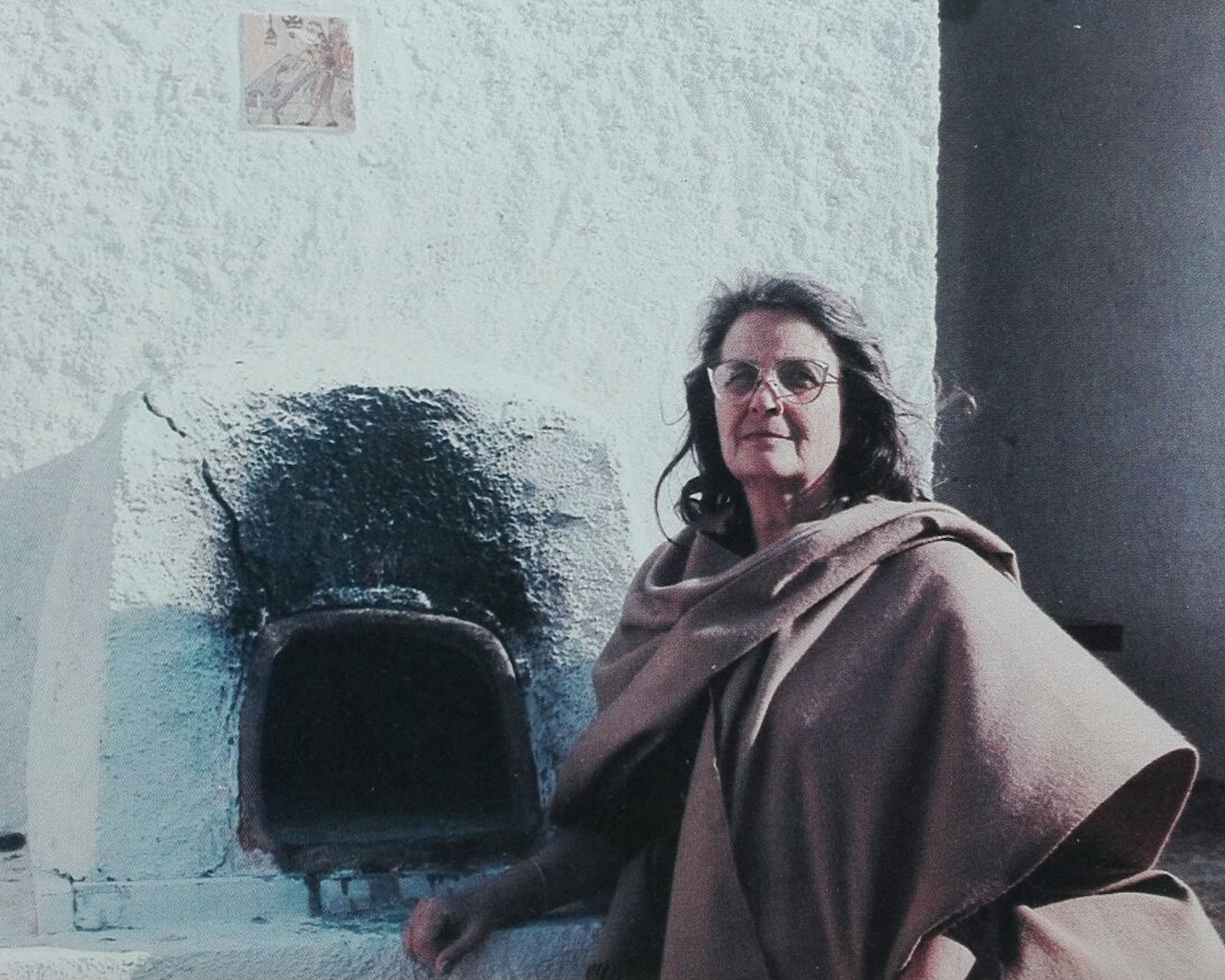
- Carmina Useros with a Moorish oven
- Born: Carmina Useros Cortés; 24 February 1928; Albacete, Spain
- Died: 23 March 2017 (aged 89); Albacete, Spain
- Education: Complutense University of Madrid
- Occupations: Writer, ceramist, painter, cultural manager
- Spouse: Manuel Belmonte González
- Children: Carmina Belmonte; Elisa Belmonte

Carmina Useros Cortés (24 February 1928 – 23 March 2017) was a Spanish writer, ceramist, painter, and cultural manager. A researcher of the gastronomic, artisan, and cultural traditions of Albacete, she was one of the first women gastronomes in Spain.

She was president and director of the Chinchilla de Montearagón National Ceramics Museum, a member of the Institute of Albacete Studies, a founding member of the Castilian-Manchego Gastronomy Academy, an honorary member of the Athenaeum of Albacete, a director of the Cueva de la Leña Art Gallery, and president of the Gastronomic Association that bears her name.

== Biography ==
Carmina Useros earned a licentiate in teaching at the Normal School of Albacete. She studied Philosophy and Literature at the Complutense University of Madrid. In the 1950s, she taught women to read and write. Until 1972, she cooked for the Sacred Heart of Jesus of Albacete Charitable Institution. In the 1970s, she was the only woman to sign a letter of support for the anti-Francoist Platajunta.

She married the ophthalmologist Manuel Belmonte González, and in 1968, they began touring the Province of Albacete, researching and recovering its cultural heritage. She drew on these experiences to write publications such as the 1971 cookbook Mil recetas de Albacete y su provincia (A Thousand Recipes of Albacete and its Province) and 1973's En busca de la Artesanía de Albacete (In Search of the Crafts of Albacete). The couple later expanded their travels throughout the Iberian Peninsula and the Bealearic and Canary archipelagos. The materials that made up the Belmonte-Useros collection would be the foundation of a museum of clay crafts, the National Ceramics Museum in Chinchilla de Montearagón, an enclave in which clay had been worked since the Neolithic. In 1970 they restored the Agujero de Chinchilla Caves, making them an art gallery.

Useros developed an intense focus on the dissemination and reading of Don Quixote, organizing the "Ruta del Quijote" in 1971. In 1995, she began a cycle of readings of Quixote held every first Sunday of the month in La Mancha's village of Casa del Olivar, offering a Quixotic food to those who attended.

Useros and Belmonte had five children – Manuel, Pilar, José Pablo, the politician Carmina Belmonte, and the soprano Elisa Belmonte.

Carmina Useros died in Albacete on 23 March 2017 after a long illness.

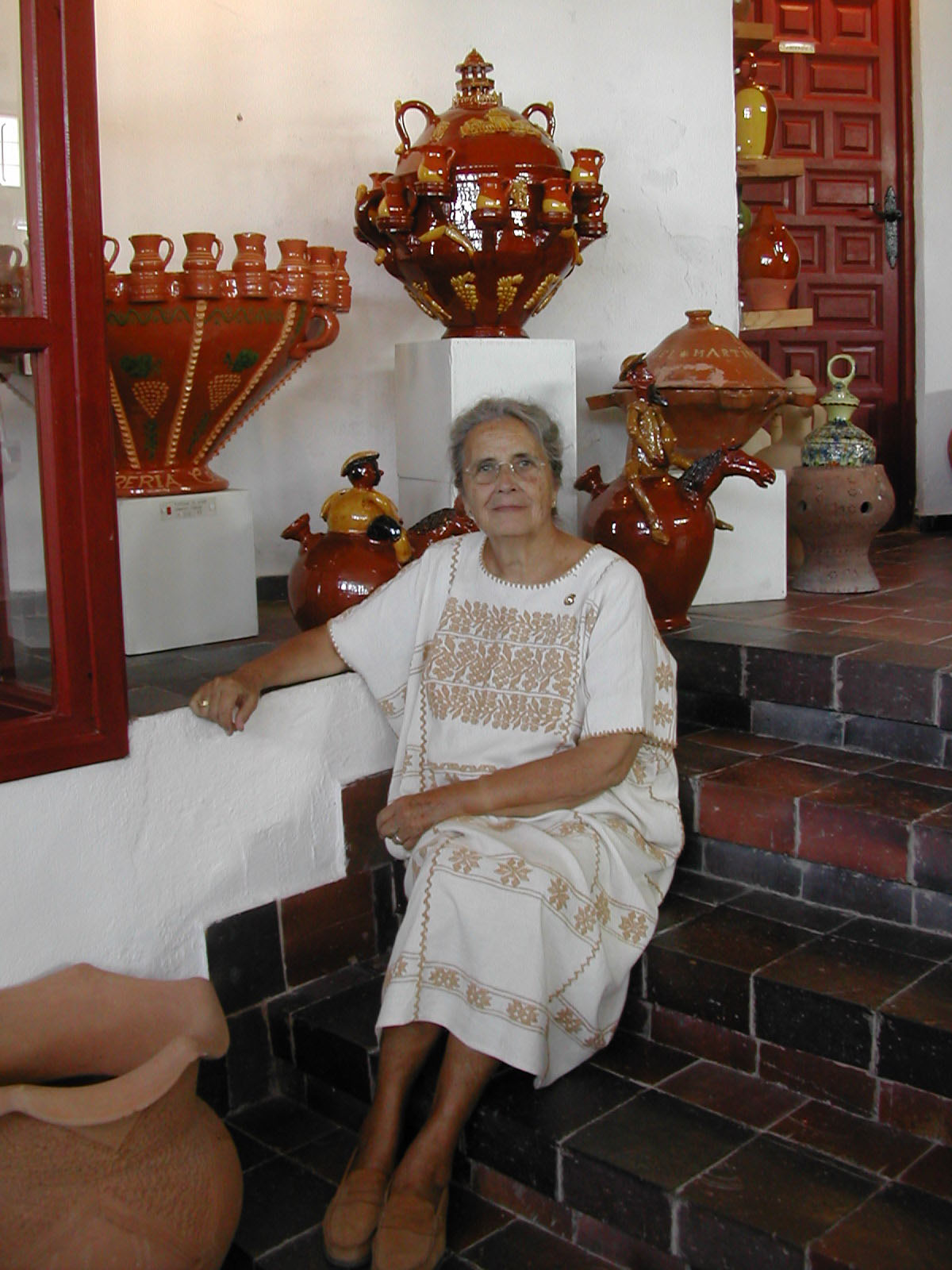
Carmina Useros in the museum that she created with her husband

== Publications ==
- Cocina de Albacete. Mil recetas de Albacete y su provincia (1971, 1992, 2001), ISBN 9788493207601
- En busca de la Artesanía de Albacete (1973), ISBN 9788440063854
- La Guía de la Gastronomía de La Mancha (1975), with Manuel Belmonte González
- Fiestas populares de Albacete y su provincia (1980), ISBN 9788430031153
- Guía de la Artesanía de Albacete (1986), with Carlos Villasante Pareja, ISBN 9788477880110

== Awards and distinctions ==
In 2002, Carmina Useros received the Albacetian of the Year award from the President of Castilla–La Mancha, José Bono.

The novelist and gastronome Manuel Vázquez Montalbán mentions her in his novel La Rosa de Alejandría as "the excellent Carmina Useros".
