= John R. Carling =

American novelist

- Occupation: Writer
- Writing career
- Genre: Historical fiction
- Notable works: The Doomed City, The Shadow of the Czar

John Carling was a writer of historical fiction novels. He is best known for his novel The Doomed City (1910).

== Novels ==
- The Shadow Of The Czar (1902)
- The Viking's Skull (1904)
- The Weird Picture (1905)
- By Neva's Waters (1907)
- The Doomed City (1910)
