= Carline =

Carline is both a surname and a given name. It is a Dutch and German feminine given name that is a diminutive form of Carla, Carolina and Caroline. It is an English surname derived from Carl. Notable people with the name include:

Surname:

- Annie Carline (1862–1945), English painter
- George Francis Carline (1855–1920), English painter
- Sydney Carline (1888–1929), English artist and teacher
- Hilda Carline (1889–1950), English painter
- Richard Carline (1896–1980), English artist, arts administrator and writer
- Nancy Carline (1909–2004), English painter

Given name:

- Carline Bouw (born 1984), Dutch rower
- Carline Muir (born 1987), Canadian sprinter
- Carline Ray, American jazz instrumentalist and vocalist
- Carline van Breugel (born 1994), Dutch politician

== See also ==
- Carlina (name)
- Carlini (name)
- Carlino (name)
- Charline (name)
- Carlin (name)
- Carlyne
- Karlin (surname)
- Charlin (disambiguation)
- Carlina, a thistle genus, common name carline thistle
- Carline skipper, a species of butterfly
- Carlien Dirkse van den Heuvel
