= John Carlin (painter) =

American artist (1813–1891)

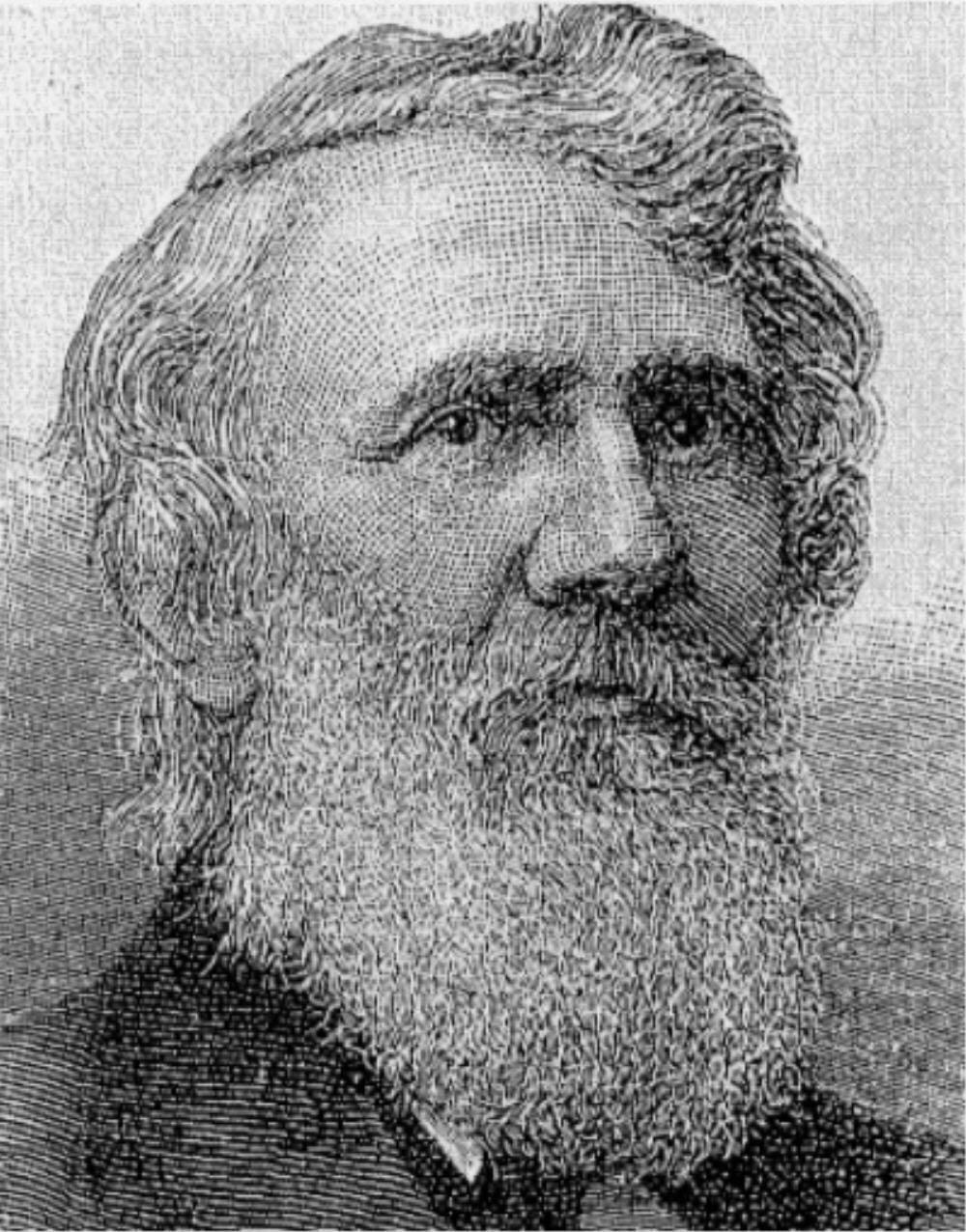
- Born: 15 May 1813 or 15 June 1813; Philadelphia
- Died: 23 April 1891 (aged 77); New York City
- Education: Pennsylvania School for the Deaf

John Carlin (15 May or 15 June 1813 in Philadelphia – 23 April 1891 in New York City) was an American illustrator, painter and poet. He was the first published deaf poet in the USA.

== Life ==
John Carlin was born deaf or lost his hearing in early childhood. His younger brother Andrew was also deaf, and their parents were unable to pay for their children's education. John Carlin was picked up on the street in 1820 by David G. Seixas, who was responsible for educating deaf street children. He then attended the Mount Airy School (later Pennsylvania School for the Deaf), which emerged from Seixas' privately started aid institution, until 1825, and after graduation had to support himself as a sign and house painter. He also studied drawing and portrait painting and at times had John Rubens Smith and John Neagle as teachers, for a time before he went to London in 1838 to further his education, studying antiquities in the British Museum. Then he was a student of Paul Delaroche in Paris. During this time, he also created illustrations for Paradise Lost and The Pilgrim's Progress. In 1841 he returned to America and settled in New York City as a miniature painter. He also published verses in the Philadelphia Saturday Courier under the title The Deaf-Mutes' Lament. He also wrote other poems and various articles, for example about architecture. He was the first deaf poet in his country to have his works published. His book for kids The Scratchiest Family came out in 1868.

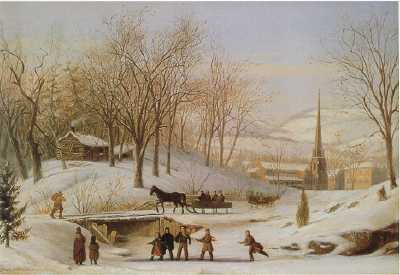
Snow Scene at Utica

After miniature painting was dethroned by the emergence of portrait photography, Carlin gave up this previously lucrative line of business and concentrated on larger-format works. Some of his paintings from this phase were later exhibited in the International Exhibition of Fine and Applied Arts by Deaf Artists at the Nicholas Roerich Museum in New York City.

Carlin's paintings were exhibited at the Detroit Institute of Arts. Portrait of Laurent Clerc by Carlin is in the collection of Gallaudet University and an oil painting depicting Clerc hangs in the Kentucky School for the Deaf. The Los Angeles County Museum of Art as well as the Metropolitan Museum of Art, the Detroit Institute of Arts and the New York Historical Society also have paintings by Carlin.

In addition to his artistic interests, Carlin was also invested in social causes, especially those concerning deaf people. He raised money to build St. Ann Church for the Deaf in New York and the Gallaudet Home for Aged and Infirm Deaf. He also founded the Manhattan Literary Association of Deaf Mutes. At the opening of Gallaudet University in 1864, which he helped establish, he was one of the opening speakers; later he received the first MA honoris causa of the college. In 1881 he was a speaker at the first meeting of the Pennsylvania Society for the Advancement of the Deaf. Although Carlin could not read lips or speak oral language, he was a staunch believer that those skills should be taught to the deaf.

John Carlin was on the committee to erect a monument to Thomas Hopkins Gallaudet in Hartford (Connecticut). His design for one of the bas-reliefs showed Gallaudet teaching students the finger alphabet.

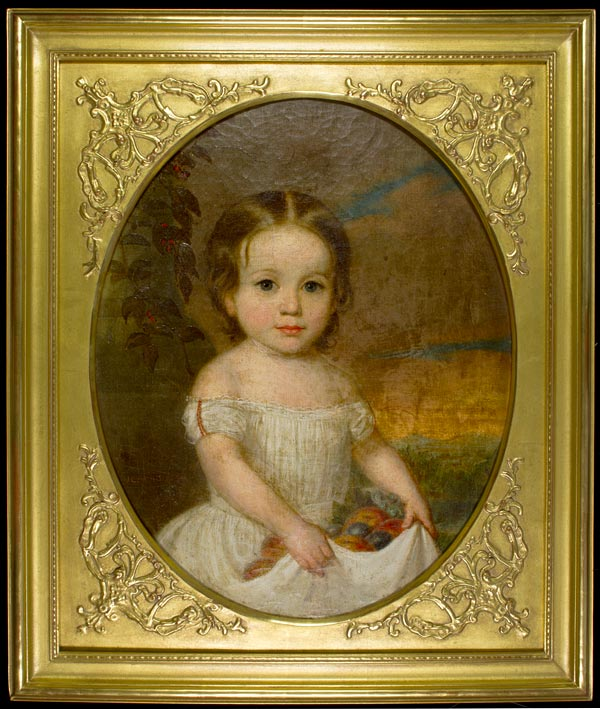
Frances S. Carlin

In 1843 John Carlin married a niece of Abraham Lincoln's secretary William Henry Seward, Mary Wayman. According to Christopher Krentz, she was also deaf. The marriage resulted in five hearing children, one of whom, Frances Seward Carlin (1851-1925), also became a painter most known for her floral still lifes, but also studies of French peasants and their homes.
