= Carling (surname) =

Carling is a surname of several origins.

== List of people with the surname ==
- Finn Carling (1925–2004), Norwegian novelist, playwright, poet and essayist
- Gunhild Carling (born 1975), Swedish jazz musician
- John Carling (1828–1911), Canadian politician
- John R. Carling (fl. 1902–1910), American writer, author of historical novels
- Sam Carling (born 2002), British politician
- Thomas Carling (fl. 1840), English founder of Carling Beer
- Victoria Carling, English radio, television, film and theatre actress
- Will Carling (born 1965), former England Rugby Union captain
