= Carlinos =

Spanish footballer

Personal information
- Full name: Carlos Menéndez Hevia
- Date of birth: 17 February 1987 (age 39)
- Place of birth: Noreña, Spain
- Height: 1.63 m (5 ft 4 in)
- Position: Winger

Youth career
- Sporting Gijón

Senior career*
Years	Team	Apps	(Gls)
2005–2012	Sporting Gijón B	144	(31)
2011	→ Real Unión (loan)	9	(0)
2012–2013	Veria	2	(0)
2013	Condal	8	(3)
2013–2016	Tarxien Rainbows	60	(5)
2016	Universitario Sucre	0	(0)
2016–2017	L'Entregu	1	(0)
2017–2018	Avilés	28	(0)
2018–2020	Siero	53	(3)
Total		305	(42)
- * Club domestic league appearances and goals

Carlos Menéndez Hevia (born 17 February 1987), commonly known as Carlinos, is a Spanish former footballer who played as a winger.

== Club career ==
Born in Noreña, Asturias, Carlinos graduated from Sporting de Gijón's youth setup, and made his debut with the reserves, playing several seasons in Segunda División B and Tercera División. In summer 2010 he signed a new contract, being promoted to the main squad; initially listed for loan, he failed to join any other club and was not registered for the forthcoming campaign.

On 26 January 2011, Carlinos was loaned to Real Unión of the third division, until June. He subsequently returned to Sporting, being again assigned to the B team.

Carlinos left Sporting in June 2012 and moved abroad for the first time in his career, joining Super League Greece side Veria FC. He made his professional debut on 21 October, coming on as a substitute for Pantelis Kafes in a 3–0 away loss against Asteras Tripolis FC.

Having been rarely played, Carlinos subsequently returned to his homeland, joining fourth-tier Condal Club in September 2013. On 28 November, he signed a short-term deal at Tarxien Rainbows F.C. in Malta.
