= Cârligu River =

Cârligu River may refer to:

- Cârligu, a tributary of the Șușița in Gorj County
- Cârligu, a tributary of the Zlata in Hunedoara County

== See also ==
- Cârligele River (disambiguation)
- Cârlig (disambiguation)
