= Carlina (name) =

Carlina is a feminine given name that is a diminutive form of Carla and Carlotta. Notable people referred to by this name include the following:

== Given name ==
- Carlina Durán Baldera, birthname of Carola Durán (born 1987), Dominican model and beauty queen (Miss Dominican Republic 2012)
- Carlina Pereira (c. 1926 – 2011), Cape Verdean politician
- Carlina Rivera (born 1984), American politician
- Carlina Renae White (born 1987), American kidnap victim

== See also ==
- Carina (name)
- Carlena
- Carlia
- Carlin (name)
- Carline
- Carling (given name)
- Carlini (name)
- Carlino (name)
- Carmina (name)
- Carolina (name)
- Karlina
- Carlia S. Westcott
