= John Carlin (umpire) =

English cricketer and test umpire

John Carlin (1861–1944) was an English first-class cricketer and Test umpire . Born in Nottinghamshire in 1861, he played 76 first-class matches for Nottinghamshire as a wicket keeper and left-handed batsman between 1887 and 1901. He took 101 catches, completed 39 stumpings and scored 1577 runs with a best of 85. He also took 5 wickets. He umpired 4 test matches between 1905 and 1909 in England, standing in three Ashes tests and one featuring South Africa. He died in Mansfield in 1944.
