= Cârligele River =

Cârligele River may refer to:

- Cârligele, a tributary of the Sadu in Sibiu County
- Cârligele, a tributary of the Văsălatu in Argeș County

== See also ==
- Cârligu River (disambiguation)
- Cârlig (disambiguation)
