= List of Nottinghamshire County Cricket Club players =

This is a list in alphabetical order of cricketers who have played for Nottinghamshire County Cricket Club since it was founded in 1841 by members of the old Nottingham Cricket Club. The town club played historically important matches from 1771 to 1848, as did the county club from 1841 to 1863. Starting in 1864, Nottinghamshire have always held first-class status. In addition, Nottinghamshire have been a List A team since the beginning of limited overs cricket in 1963; and a Twenty20 team since the inauguration of the Twenty20 Cup in 2003.

The list excludes Second XI and other players who did not play for the club's first team; and players whose first team appearances were in minor matches only. Players who took part in county matches arranged by the town club before 1841 are included if they also played for the county club, but excluded if not. Players who played only for Nottingham Cricket Club are included in List of Nottingham Cricket Club players.

In the list, the details are the player's usual name followed by the years in which he was active as a Nottinghamshire player, and then his name is given as it usually appears on match scorecards. Note that many players represented other teams besides Nottinghamshire. Current players are shown as active to the latest season in which they played for the club. The list has been updated to the end of the 2021 cricket season using the data published in Playfair Cricket Annual, 2022 edition.

== A ==
- Andre Adams (2007–2014) : A. R. Adams
- Jimmy Adams (1994) : J. C. Adams
- Andy Afford (1984–1996) : J. A. Afford
- Usman Afzaal (1995–2003) : U. Afzaal
- Mark Allbrook (1976–1980) : M. E. Allbrook
- Ernest Allen (1903) : E. G. Allen
- Ted Alletson (1906–1914) : E. B. Alletson
- David Alleyne (2004–2007) : D. Alleyne
- Hashim Amla (2010) : H. M. Amla
- Alfred Anthony (1875–1876) : A. F. O. Anthony
- George Anthony (1898–1905) : G. Anthony
- Henry Anthony (1898–1902) : H. Anthony
- Graeme Archer (1992–1999) : G. F. Archer
- Alan Armitage (1950–1951) : A. K. Armitage
- Thomas Armstrong (1892–1896) : T. Armstrong
- Arthur Ashwell (1876) : A. T. Ashwell
- Ravichandran Ashwin (2019) : R. Ashwin
- Nathan Astle (1997) : N. J. Astle
- John Atkinson (1899–1901) : J. Atkinson
- Tom Atkinson (1956–1960) : T. Atkinson
- Vikram Atri (2002–2003) : V. Atri
- Henry Attenburrow (1847) : H. C. Attenburrow
- Thomas Attewell (1891–1894) : T. Attewell
- Walter Attewell (1891) : W. Attewell
- William Attewell (1881–1899) : W. Attewell

== B ==
- George Bacon (2013) : G. P. W. Bacon
- Robert Bagguley (1891–1896) : R. Bagguley
- David Baker (1964–1965) : D. W. Baker
- Jake Ball (2009–2021) : J. T. Ball
- George Banner (1885) : G. Banner
- Colin Banton (1995) : C. Banton
- David Barber (1960) : T. D. Barber
- Tom Barber (2020–2021) : T. E. Barber
- William Barber (1904) : W. D. Barber
- Thomas Barker (1841–1845) : T. Barker
- James Barnes (1908–1910) : J. W. Barnes
- Thomas Barnes (1872–1873) : T. Barnes
- Billy Barnes (1875–1894) : W. Barnes
- John Barnsdale (1905) : J. D. Barnsdale
- Fred Barratt (1914–1931) : F. Barratt
- Abraham Bass (1843) : A. Bass
- Chappell Batchelor (1845–1858) : C. Batchelor
- Augustus Bateman (1862) : A. Bateman
- Edward Bateman (1855) : E. L. Bateman
- Arthur Bates (1878) : A. J. Bates
- Richard Bates (1993–1999) : R. T. Bates
- Austin Baxter (1952–1953) : A. G. Baxter
- George Bean (1885) : G. Bean
- John Beevor (1868–1873) : J. G. Beevor
- Henry Bembridge (1878) : H. Bembridge
- Arthur Bennett (1889–1896) : A. R. Bennett
- Gordon Beves (1888–1891) : G. Beves
- John Bickley (1847–1862) : J. Bickley
- Darren Bicknell (1999–2006) : D. J. Bicknell
- Samuel Biddulph (1862–1875) : S. Biddulph
- Richard Bielby (1967–1971) : S. R. Bielby
- Thomas Bignall (1863–1878) : T. Bignall
- Robin Bilbie (1960–1963) : A. R. Bilbie
- John Birch (1973–1988) : J. D. Birch
- Jackson Bird (2016) : J. M. Bird
- Tom Birtle (1952) : T. W. Birtle
- John Bishop (1923–1925) : J. F. Bishop
- Benjamin Blackburn (1879) : B. F. Blackburn
- Edward Blagg (1948) : E. A. Blagg
- Dennis Bland (1929–1934) : R. D. F. Bland
- Jack Blatherwick (2019) : J. M. Blatherwick
- Greg Blewett (2001) : G. S. Blewett
- Nicky Boje (2002) : N. Boje
- Brian Bolus (1963–1972) : J. B. Bolus
- Jack Bond (1974) : J. D. Bond
- Michael Bore (1979–1988) : M. K. Bore
- Daniel Bottom (1899) : D. Bottom
- Mark Bowen (1996–2000) : M. N. Bowen
- Wallace Bower (1914) : W. Bower
- James Bradley (1937–1945) : J. Bradley
- Steven Bramhall (1992–1993) : S. Bramhall
- Charles Brampton (1854–1867) : C. Brampton
- Trevor Branston (1903–1913) : G. T. Branston
- Kraigg Brathwaite (2018) : K. C. Brathwaite
- Darren Bravo (2011) : D. M. Bravo
- Joseph Briggs (1888) : J. B. Briggs
- Chris Broad (1984–1992) : B. C. Broad
- Stuart Broad (2008–2021) : S. C. J. Broad
- Mark Broadhurst (1995–1996) : M. Broadhurst
- Pascal Broadley (1991) : V. J. P. Broadley
- Alfred Brooks (1877) : A. J. Brooks
- Ali Brown (2009–2011) : A. D. Brown
- Charles Brown (1843–1861) : C. Brown
- John Brown (1888) : J. Brown
- Jason Brown (2009) : J. F. Brown
- Samuel Brown (1896–1897) : S. Brown
- Thomas Brown (1881) : T. Brown
- Tom Buckland (1888) : T. G. Buckland
- Sol Budinger (2021) : S. G. Budinger
- Arthur Burrows (1887) : A. D. Burrows
- William Bury (1861–1862) : W. Bury
- Fred Butler (1881–1893) : F. Butler
- George Butler (1841–1852) : G. Butler
- Harold Butler (1933–1954) : H. J. Butler
- Ian Butler (2013) : I. G. Butler
- John Butler (1889) : J. Butler
- Robert Butler (1870–1877) : R. Butler
- John Buttery (1843–1845) : J. Buttery
- Joseph Buxton (1937) : J. H. Buxton

== C ==
- Chris Cairns (1988–2008) : C. L. Cairns
- Dave Callaghan (1988) : D. J. Callaghan
- John Carlin (1887–1901) : J. Carlin
- Arthur Carr (1910–1934) : A. W. Carr
- Andy Carter (2009–2015) : A. Carter
- Jarvis Carter (1895) : A. G. Carter
- Matthew Carter (2015–2021) : M. Carter
- Vincent Cartwright (1901–1904) : V. H. Cartwright
- Stafford Castledine (1933–1934) : S. W. T. Castledine
- George Chambers (1896–1899) : G. H. Chambers
- George Chambers (1903–1905) : G. H. Chambers
- Meshach Chambers (1894) : M. Chambers
- Frederick Champion de Crespigny (1848) : F. J. Champion de Crespigny
- John Chapman (1840–1848) : J. Chapman
- Robert Chapman (1992–1996) : R. J. Chapman
- Zak Chappell (2019–2021) : Z. J. Chappell
- James Chatterton (1856–1867) : J. Chatterton
- Daniel Christian (2016–2021) : D. T. Christian
- Alfred Clarke (1851–1863) : A. Clarke
- Joe Clarke (2019–2021) : J. M. Clarke
- William Clarke (1874–1877) : W. B. Clarke
- William Clarke (1841–1855) : W. Clarke
- William Clarke (1876–1877) : W. Clarke
- John Clay (1948–1965) : J. D. Clay
- Alan Cleveley (1955) : A. B. Cleveley
- Cecil Clifton (1908–1910) : C. C. Clifton
- Charles Clifton (1867–1876) : C. Clifton
- Gareth Clough (2001–2008) : G. D. Clough
- Thomas Collins (1921) : T. H. Collins
- Ben Compton (2019–2021) : B. G. Compton
- John Cook (1974–1975) : C. J. Cook
- Kevin Cooper (1976–1992) : K. E. Cooper
- David Coote (1977) : D. E. Coote
- Syd Copley (1930) : S. H. Copley
- Andrew Corran (1961–1965) : A. J. Corran
- John Cotton (1958–1964) : J. Cotton
- Paul Coughlin (2019) : P. Coughlin
- Ed Cowan (2013) : E. J. M. Cowan
- Ramsay Cox (1930–1954) : H. R. Cox
- Alexander Crawford (1912) : A. B. Crawford
- Mark Crawley (1991–1994) : M. A. Crawley
- Charles Creswell (1840–1843) : C. Creswell
- Matthew Cross (2013–2014) : M. H. Cross
- Arthur Cursham (1876–1878) : A. W. Cursham
- Henry Cursham (1880–1904) : H. A. Cursham
- Christopher Curzon (1978–1980) : C. C. Curzon
- John Curzon (1978) : J. T. Curzon

== D ==
- Charles Daft (1862–1870) : C. F. Daft
- Harry Daft (1885–1899) : H. B. Daft
- Richard Daft (1858–1893) : R. Daft
- Richard Daft (1886–1893) : R. P. Daft
- Samuel Dakin (1845) : S. Dakin
- Mark Davies (2007) : A. M. Davies
- Thomas Davis (1854–1865) : T. Davis
- Ian Davison (1959–1966) : I. J. Davison
- John Day (1903–1907) : J. W. Day
- Charles Dench (1897–1902) : C. E. Dench
- Wayne Dessaur (1992–1994) : W. A. Dessaur
- Hermon Dexter (1902–1903) : H. W. Dexter
- Roy Dexter (1975–1981) : R. E. Dexter
- Alfred Diver (1858) : A. J. D. Diver
- John Dixon (1882–1905) : J. A. Dixon
- Bruce Dooland (1953–1957) : B. Dooland
- Dilip Doshi (1973–1978) : D. R. Doshi
- Mathew Dowman (1992–1999) : M. P. Dowman
- Vasbert Drakes (1999) : V. C. Drakes
- John Drury (1899–1902) : J. J. Drury
- Ben Duckett (2018–2021) : B. M. Duckett

== E ==
- Mark Ealham (2004–2009) : M. A. Ealham
- Richard Earle (1857–1861) : R. B. Earle
- Gordon Edwards (1973) : G. Edwards
- Neil Edwards (2010–2012) : N. J. Edwards
- William Elliott (1871–1875) : W. Elliott
- Bill Ellis (1948) : W. Ellis
- Henry Ellison (1897) : H. R. N. Ellison
- Michael Ellison (1852) : M. J. Ellison
- Scott Elstone (2010–2012) : S. L. Elstone
- Steve Elworthy (2003) : S. Elworthy
- Herbert Emmitt (1888) : H. W. Emmitt
- Henry Enfield (1869–1872) : H. Enfield
- Kevin Evans (1984–1999) : K. P. Evans
- Russell Evans (1985–1990) : R. J. Evans
- Joey Evison (2019–2021) : J. D. M. Evison

== F ==
- Bryan Farr (1941–1951) : B. H. Farr
- Frank Farrands (1871–1873) : F. H. Farrands
- Mark Fell (1981–1983) : M. A. Fell
- John Fellows (1904–1905) : J. P. Fellows
- Rob Ferley (2007–2008) : R. S. Ferley
- Alfred Fewkes (1864) : A. Fewkes
- Michael Field-Buss (1989–1995) : M. G. Field-Buss
- John Firth (1919) : J. D. E. Firth
- Henry Flear (1843) : H. Flear
- Stephen Fleming (2005–2007) : S. P. Fleming
- Luke Fletcher (2008–2021) : L. J. Fletcher
- Benjamin Flint (1919–1920) : B. Flint
- William Flint (1919–1929) : W. A. Flint
- Thomas Flowers (1894) : T. Flowers
- Wilfred Flowers (1877–1896) : W. Flowers
- George Foljambe (1879–1881) : G. S. Foljambe
- Mark Footitt (2005–2018) : M. H. A. Footitt
- Carlton Forbes (1959–1973) : C. Forbes
- Peter Forman (1959–1962) : P. R. Forman
- William Foster (1889) : W. Foster
- Frederick Fox (1890) : F. I. Fox
- Will Fraine (2018) : W. A. R. Fraine
- Simon Francis (2007) : S. R. G. Francis
- James Franklin (2014) : J. E. C. Franklin
- Paul Franks (1996–2013) : P. J. Franks
- David Fraser-Darling (1984–1988) : C. D. Fraser-Darling
- Bruce French (1976–1995) : B. N. French
- Graham Frost (1967–1973) : G. Frost

== G ==
- Jason Gallian (1998–2007) : J. E. R. Gallian
- William Garrat (1841–1845) : W. Garrat
- George Gauld (1913–1919) : G. O. Gauld
- Robert Gibson (1855–1858) : R. Gibson
- Will Gidman (2015) : W. R. S. Gidman
- Noel Gie (1995–1999) : N. A. Gie
- John Gilbert (1843–1845) : J. Gilbert
- Ron Giles (1937–1959) : R. J. Giles
- Alan Gill (1960–1965) : A. Gill
- Keith Gillhouley (1963–1966) : K. Gillhouley
- Billy Good (1841–1843) : B. Good
- William Goodacre (1898–1903) : W. B. Goodacre
- Harry Goodall (1900–1905) : H. H. Goodall
- Gamini Goonesena (1952–1964) : G. Goonesena
- Christopher Grant (1968) : C. R. W. Grant
- Benjamin Gregory (1895–1897) : B. B. Gregory
- John Griffiths (1891) : J. T. Griffiths
- George Groves (1899–1900) : G. J. Groves
- James Grundy (1851–1867) : J. Grundy
- George Gunn (1902–1932) : G. Gunn
- George Gunn junior (1928–1950) : G. V. Gunn
- John Gunn (1896–1925) : J. R. Gunn
- William Gunn (1880–1904) : W. Gunn
- Harry Gurney (2011–2019) : H. F. Gurney
- Frank Guttridge (1889–1900) : F. H. Guttridge
- Joe Guy (1841–1854) : J. Guy

== H ==
- Peter Hacker (1974–1981) : P. J. Hacker
- Richard Hadlee (1978–1987) : R. J. Hadlee
- Alex Hales (2008–2021) : A. D. Hales
- David Halfyard (1968–1970) : D. J. Halfyard
- John Hall (1935–1946) : J. B. Hall
- Michael Hall (cricketer) (1954–1959) : M. J. Hall
- Albert Hallam (1901–1910) : A. W. Hallam
- Haseeb Hameed (2020–2021) : H. Hameed
- Alick Handford (1894–1898) : A. Handford
- Joe Hardstaff Jr (1930–1955) : J. Hardstaff Jr
- Joe Hardstaff Sr (1902–1924) : J. Hardstaff Sr
- Richard Hardstaff (1887–1899) : R. G. Hardstaff
- Silas Hardy (1893–1895) : S. Hardy
- Dusty Hare (1971–1977) : W. H. Hare
- Andrew Harris (2000–2008) : A. J. Harris
- Charles Harris (1928–1951) : C. B. Harris
- Pasty Harris (1969–1982) : M. J. Harris
- William Harris (1886–1887) : W. Harris
- Calvin Harrison (2021) : C. G. Harrison
- Christopher Harrison (1878) : C. Harrison
- Isaac Harrison (1901) : I. M. Harrison
- Percy Harrison (1899) : P. Harrison
- Jamie Hart (1995–1999) : J. P. Hart
- Edward Hartopp (1843) : E. S. E. Hartopp
- Peter Harvey (1947–1958) : P. F. Harvey
- Basher Hassan (1966–1985) : S. B. Hassan
- John Hatfield (1854) : J. Hatfield
- Frank Hawley (1897) : F. Hawley
- Michael Haynes (1959–1961) : M. W. Haynes
- Gordon Hayward (1951) : J. G. R. Hayward
- Giles Haywood (2000) : G. R. Haywood
- George Heane (1927–1951) : G. F. H. Heane
- Thomas Heath (1841–1847) : T. Heath
- Ralph Hemingway (1903–1905) : R. E. Hemingway
- Eddie Hemmings (1979–1992) : E. E. Hemmings
- Mike Hendrick (1982–1984) : M. Hendrick
- William Henson (1897–1898) : W. W. Henson
- Mervyn Herbert (1901–1902) : M. R. H. M. Herbert
- Christopher Hewison (2000–2001) : C. J. Hewison
- William Heymann (1905) : W. G. Heymann
- Ben Hilfenhaus (2015) : B. W. Hilfenhaus
- Maurice Hill (1953–1965) : M. Hill
- Norman Hill (1953–1968) : N. W. Hill
- John Hilton (1865) : J. Hilton
- Alfred Hind (1900–1901) : A. E. Hind
- Benjamin Hind (1911) : B. J. Hind
- Samuel Hind (1877–1878) : S. Hind
- James Hindson (1992–1998) : J. E. Hindson
- Harold Hodges (1911–1912) : H. A. Hodges
- John Hodgkins (1938–1951) : J. S. Hodgkins
- Richard Hodgkinson (2002–2005) : R. Hodgkinson
- John Hogg (1858–1861) : J. Hogg
- Kyle Hogg (2007) : K. W. Hogg
- William Holmes (1919) : W. Holmes
- James Horsley (1913) : J. Horsley
- Norman Horsley (1947) : N. Horsley
- William Horsley (1862–1863) : W. Horsley
- Richard Housley (1870) : R. Housley
- John Howarth (1966–1970) : J. S. Howarth
- George Howitt (1866–1870) : G. Howitt
- Richard Howitt (1890–1901) : R. H. Howitt
- Edward Howsin (1863) : E. A. Howsin
- Geoffrey Huskinson (1922–1942) : G. N. B. Huskinson
- David Hussey (2004–2013) : D. J. Hussey
- Brett Hutton (2011–2021) : B. A. Hutton

== I ==
- Nigel Illingworth (1981–1983) : N. J. B. Illingworth
- Imad Wasim (2019–2020) : Imad Wasim
- Imran Tahir (2015–2016) : Imran Tahir
- Albert Iremonger (1906–1910) : A. Iremonger
- James Iremonger (1897–1914) : J. Iremonger

== J ==
- John Jackson (1855–1866) : J. Jackson
- William Jackson (1848) : W. Jackson
- Charles James (1906–1921) : C. C. James
- Lyndon James (2018–2021) : L. W. James
- Phil Jaques (2014) : P. A. Jaques
- George Jarvis (1841) : G. Jarvis
- Will Jefferson (2007–2009) : W. I. Jefferson
- Arthur Jepson (1938–1959) : A. Jepson
- Alec Johnson (1963–1966) : A. A. Johnson
- Isaac Johnson (1840–1843) : I. Johnson
- Peter Johnson (1970–1977) : P. D. Johnson
- Paul Johnson (1981–2002) : P. Johnson
- Arthur Jones (1892–1914) : A. O. Jones
- David Jones (1935–1939) : D. Jones

== K ==
- Gary Keedy (2014–2015) : G. Keedy
- Walter Keeton (1926–1952) : W. W. Keeton
- John Kelly (1953–1957) : J. Kelly
- Robert Kelsall (1969) : R. S. Kelsall
- Sam Kelsall (2011–2014) : S. Kelsall
- John Kesteven (1876) : J. Kesteven
- George Kettle (1843) : G. M. Kettle
- Sam King (2021) : S. I. M. King
- Lionel Kirk (1920–1929) : L. Kirk
- William Kirk (1888) : W. N. Kirk
- Lance Klusener (2002) : L. Klusener
- Joseph Knowles (1935–1946) : J. Knowles

== L ==
- Dean Laing (1990) : D. R. Laing
- George Lane (1881) : G. Lane
- Harold Larwood (1924–1938) : H. Larwood
- Harry Latchman (1974–1976) : A. H. Latchman
- Garnet Lee (1910–1922) : G. M. Lee
- Chris Lewis (1992–1995) : C. C. Lewis
- Jake Libby (2014–2019) : J. D. Libby
- Ben Lilley (1921–1937) : B. Lilley
- Tinsley Lindley (1887–1893) : T. Lindley
- Vincent Lindo (1960) : C. V. Lindo
- Bill Lockwood (1886–1887) : W. H. Lockwood
- Richard Logan (2001–2004) : R. J. Logan
- Albert Longdon (1895) : A. Longdon
- Sam Lowe (1894) : S. Lowe
- Tom Lowe (1894) : T. Lowe
- Walter Lowe (1895) : W. G. H. Lowe
- David Lucas (1998–2004) : D. S. Lucas
- Michael Lumb (2012–2017) : M. J. Lumb

== M ==
- Alexander MacDougall (1858) : A. W. MacDougall
- Stuart MacGill (2002–2004) : S. C. G. MacGill
- Kevin Mackintosh (1978–1980) : K. S. Mackintosh
- Nadeem Malik (2001–2007) : M. N. Malik
- Henry Maltby (1843) : H. Maltby (Note: The identity of the Henry Maltby who played for Nottinghamshire in 1843 is uncertain and it may be that the appearance was by another man with the same name.)
- William Marriott (1880–1881) : W. Marriott
- Bertie Marshall (1923–1929) : B. Marshall
- Edwin Marshall (1937–1938) : E. A. Marshall
- Walter Marshall (1879–1891) : W. Marshall
- Eric Martin (1949–1959) : E. J. Martin
- George Martin (1867–1873) : G. N. Martin
- Duncan Martindale (1985–1991) : D. J. R. Martindale
- Percy Mason (1896–1901) : P. Mason
- Colin Matthews (1950–1959) : C. S. Matthews
- Frank Matthews (1920–1927) : F. C. L. Matthews
- Cecil Maxwell (1936–1939) : C. R. N. Maxwell
- Ben McGuire (2009) : B. T. McGuire
- Martin McIntyre (1868–1877) : M. McIntyre
- Michael McIntyre (1863–1870) : M. McIntyre
- William McIntyre (1869–1871) : W. McIntyre
- Paul McMahon (2002–2006) : P. J. McMahon
- Eric Meads (1939–1953) : E. A. Meads
- Jack Mee (1887–1896) : R. J. Mee
- Steven Mee (1984) : S. R. Mee
- Ashley Metcalfe (1996–1997) : A. A. Metcalfe
- Josh Mierkalns (2006–2007) : J. A. Mierkalns
- Greg Mike (1988–1996) : G. W. Mike
- Philip Miles (1868–1877) : P. W. H. Miles
- Keith Miller (1959) : K. R. Miller
- Geoff Millman (1957–1965) : G. Millman
- David Millns (1988–2001) : D. J. Millns
- Edwin Mills (1878–1884) : E. Mills
- John Mills (1875–1881) : J. Mills
- Matt Milnes (2018) : M. E. Milnes
- Francis Moore (1862) : F. Moore
- Ian Moore (1962–1969) : H. I. Moore
- Tom Moores (2016–2021) : T. J. Moores
- Charles Morgan (1946) : C. Morgan
- Michael Morgan (1957–1961) : M. Morgan
- Fred Morley (1872–1883) : F. Morley
- Henry Morley (1884) : H. Morley
- Thomas Morley (1887) : T. Morley
- Charles Morris (1902–1904) : C. R. Morris
- John Morris (2000–2001) : J. E. Morris
- John Moss (1892) : J. Moss
- Steven Mullaney (2010–2021) : S. J. Mullaney
- Deryck Murray (1966–1969) : D. L. Murray
- William Musters (1841–1848) : W. M. C. Musters

== N ==
- Nirmal Nanan (1971–1980) : N. Nanan
- Dirk Nannes (2010) : D. P. Nannes
- Chris Nash (2018–2020) : C. D. Nash
- Joseph Need (1841–1855) : J. S. Need
- Frank Needham (1890–1891) : F. Needham
- Oliver Newby (2005) : O. J. Newby
- Mick Newell (1984–1994) : M. Newell
- Scott Newman (2009) : S. A. Newman
- Thomas Nixon (1841–1854) : T. Nixon
- Wayne Noon (1994–2003) : W. M. Noon
- Sam Northeast (2021) : S. A. Northeast
- Bernarr Notley (1949) : B. Notley
- Francis Noyes (1842–1848) : F. Noyes

== O ==
- Archer Oates (1931–1933) : A. W. Oates
- Kevin O'Brien (2009) : K. J. O'Brien
- Thomas Oates (1897–1925) : T. W. Oates
- William Oates (1881–1882) : W. C. Oates
- Patrick Oakden (1960–1961) : R. P. Oakden
- Andrew Oram (1997–2000) : A. R. Oram
- Eric Oscroft (1950–1951) : E. Oscroft
- John Oscroft (1842–1848) : J. Oscroft
- John Oscroft (1867–1879) : J. T. Oscroft
- Percy Oscroft (1894–1900) : P. W. Oscroft
- William Oscroft (1863–1882) : W. Oscroft

== P ==
- William Padley (1876) : W. Padley
- George Paling (1865–1870) : G. Paling
- John Parkin (1966–1969) : J. M. Parkin
- Butler Parr (1841–1854) : B. Parr
- George Parr (1845–1871) : G. Parr
- Henry Parr (1856–1858) : H. J. Parr
- Samuel Parr (1841–1855) : S. Parr
- Edwin Patchitt (1841–1843) : E. Patchitt
- Akhil Patel (2009–2011) : A. Patel
- Samit Patel (2002–2021) : S. R. Patel
- Dane Paterson (2021) : D. Paterson
- Liam Patterson-White (2019–2021) : L. A. Patterson-White
- Darren Pattinson (2008–2012) : D. J. Pattinson
- James Pattinson (2017–2019) : J. L. Pattinson
- Albert Payton (1922) : A. I. Payton
- Wilfred Payton (1935) : W. E. G. Payton
- Wilfred Payton (1905–1931) : W. R. D. Payton
- Joseph Pearson (1883) : J. G. Pearson
- Philip Pearson-Gregory (1910–1914) : P. J. S. Pearson-Gregory
- David Pennett (1992–1996) : D. B. Pennett
- John Pennington (1902–1905) : J. H. Pennington
- Charles Pepper (1900–1901) : C. Pepper
- Vernon Philander (2015) : V. D. Philander
- Ben Phillips (2011–2013) : B. J. Phillips
- Andy Pick (1983–1997) : R. A. Pick
- Kevin Pietersen (2001–2004) : K. P. Pietersen
- Arthur Pike (1894–1899) : A. Pike
- David Pipes (1994) : D. J. Pipes
- Peter Plummer (1969–1972) : P. J. Plummer
- Paul Pollard (1987–1998) : P. R. Pollard
- Ian Pont (1981–1982) : I. L. Pont
- Cyril Poole (1941–1962) : C. J. Poole
- George Power (1876) : G. E. Power
- Kenneth Poole (1955–1957) : K. J. Poole
- Henry Porter (1843) : H. J. Porter
- David Pratt (1962–1963) : D. Pratt
- Alfred Price (1885–1887) : A. Price
- Walter Price (1869–1870) : W. Price
- Ashwell Prince (2008) : A. G. Prince
- Cheteshwar Pujara (2017) : C. A. Pujara
- David Pullan (1970–1974) : D. A. Pullan

== R ==
- Derek Randall (1971–1993) : D. W. Randall
- Stephen Randall (1999–2003) : S. J. Randall
- Chris Read (1998–2017) : C. M. W. Read
- Tom Reddick (1944–1947) : T. B. Reddick
- John Reddish (1930) : J. Reddish
- Oliver Redgate (1889–1894) : O. Redgate
- Sam Redgate (1841–45) : S. Redgate
- Paul Reiffel (2000) : P. R. Reiffel
- Henry Reynolds (1872–1877) : H. S. Reynolds
- Harold Rhodes (1970–1973) : H. J. Rhodes
- Stuart Rhodes (1930–1943) : S. D. Rhodes
- William Rhodes (1961–1964) : W. E. Rhodes
- Clive Rice (1975–1987) : C. E. B. Rice
- Allen Richardson (1949–1951) : A. Richardson
- Henry Richardson (1887–1890) : H. Richardson
- Stanley Richardson (1925) : S. H. Richardson
- Ian Riches (1995) : I. Riches
- Tom Richmond (1912–1928) : T. L. Richmond
- James Riley (1893–1898) : J. Riley
- William Riley (1909–1914) : W. Riley
- George Robinson (1896–1897) : G. L. Robinson
- George Robinson (1930–1943) : G. W. Robinson
- Henry Robinson (1889) : H. Robinson
- John Robinson (1888–1896) : J. S. Robinson
- Tim Robinson (1978–1999) : R. T. Robinson
- Billy Root (2015–2018) : W. D. Root
- Eddie Rowe (1949–1957) : E. J. Rowe
- Tom Rowe (2013) : T. C. Rowe
- George Royle (1871–1881) : G. M. Royle
- Andre Russell (2016) : A. D. Russell

== S ==
- Tom Savill (2002) : T. E. Savill
- Kevin Saxelby (1978–1990) : K. Saxelby
- Mark Saxelby (1989–1993) : M. Saxelby
- Dane Schadendorf (2021) : D. J. Schadendorf
- Chris Scott (1981–1991) : C. W. Scott
- William Scotton (1874–1890) : W. H. Scotton
- John Seaton (1872) : J. Seaton
- Richard Seddon (1845) : R. Seddon
- John Selby (1870–1887) : J. Selby
- William Selby (1848) : W. W. Selby
- Frank Shacklock (1883–1893) : F. J. Shacklock
- Bilal Shafayat (2001–2010) : B. M. Shafayat
- Ajmal Shahzad (2012–2014) : A. Shahzad
- John Sharpe (1894) : J. W. Sharpe
- Samuel Sharpe (1868) : S. Sharpe
- Alfred Shaw (1864–1897) : A. Shaw
- Jem Shaw (1865–1875) : J. C. Shaw
- William Shaw (1866) : W. Shaw
- Mordecai Sherwin (1876–1896) : M. Sherwin
- Frank Shipston (1925–1933) : F. W. Shipston
- Thomas Shooter (1879–1881) : T. Shooter
- Charles Shore (1881–1885) : C. Shore
- Charlie Shreck (2002–2011) : C. E. Shreck
- Arthur Shrewsbury (1874–1902) : A. Shrewsbury
- Arthur Shrewsbury (1892) : A. Shrewsbury junior
- William Shrewsbury (1875–1879) : W. Shrewsbury
- Peter Siddle (2014) : P. M. Siddle
- Tony Siddons (1959–1962) : A. Siddons
- Ryan Sidebottom (2004–2010) : R. J. Sidebottom
- William Sime (1935–1950) : W. A. Sime
- Reg Simpson (1940–1965) : R. T. Simpson
- Thomas Simpson (1903–1905) : T. Simpson
- Anurag Singh (2004–2006) : A. Singh
- Fateh Singh (2021) : F. Singh
- Ben Slater (2018–2021) : B. T. Slater
- Kenneth Smales (1951–1958) : K. Smales
- Mike Smedley (1964–1979) : M. J. Smedley
- Arthur Smith (1883) : A. P. Smith
- Greg Smith (2001–2006) : G. J. Smith
- Greg Smith (2015–2017) : G. P. Smith
- John Smith (1862–1863) : J. Smith
- John Smith (1864–1865) : J. Smith
- Will Smith (2002–2006) : W. R. Smith
- Isaiah Smithurst (1945–1946) : I. Smithurst
- John Snaith (1900) : J. C. Snaith
- Garfield Sobers (1968–1974) : G. S. Sobers
- Addil Somani (1987) : A. Somani
- Walter Speak (1905) : W. J. Speak
- John Springall (1955–1967) : J. D. Springall
- George Stanhope, 7th Earl of Chesterfield (1860–1861) : Lord G. P. C. A. Stanhope
- Arthur Staples (1924–1938) : A. Staples
- Sam Staples (1920–1934) : S. J. Staples
- James Stapleton (1899–1911) : J. Stapleton
- Harvey Staunton (1903–1910) : H. Staunton
- Barry Stead (1962–1978) : B. Stead
- Richard Stemp (1998–2001) : R. D. Stemp
- Franklyn Stephenson (1988–1991) : F. D. Stephenson
- Frederick Stinchcombe (1950–1951) : F. W. Stinchcombe
- Frederick Stocks junior (1946–1957) : F. W. Stocks
- William Story (1878–1879) : W. F. Story
- Paul Strang (1998) : P. A. Strang
- Peter Such (1982–1986) : P. M. Such
- Joseph Sulley (1887–1888) : J. Sulley
- George Summers (1867–1870) : G. Summers
- Cecil Sutton (1907) : C. A. L. Sutton
- Graeme Swann (2005–2013) : G. P. Swann
- Roy Swetman (1966–1967) : R. Swetman
- Steve Sylvester (1993–1994) : S. A. Sylvester

== T ==
- Tamim Iqbal (2011) : Tamim Iqbal
- Brendan Taylor (2015–2017) : B. R. M. Taylor
- Benjamin Taylor (1897–1909) : B. W. Taylor
- John Taylor (1876) : J. Taylor
- James Taylor (2011–2016) : J. W. A. Taylor
- Ross Taylor (2018) : L. R. P. L. Taylor
- Mike Taylor (1964–1972) : M. N. S. Taylor
- Paul Taylor (1958) : P. A. Taylor
- Ronald Taylor (1932–1935) : R. A. Taylor
- Bill Taylor (1971–1977) : W. Taylor
- Aaron Thomas (2003) : A. C. Thomas
- Adam Tillcock (2013) : A. D. Tillcock
- Francis Tinley (1845–1856) : F. E. Tinley
- Cris Tinley (1847–1869) : R. C. Tinley
- Vincent Tinley (1864) : V. Tinley
- Paul Todd (1972–1982) : P. A. Todd
- Chris Tolley (1996–2001) : C. M. Tolley
- Robert Tolley (1871–1878) : R. Tolley
- Peter Trego (2020–2021) : P. D. Trego
- John Truswell (1868) : J. R. Truswell
- Trevor Tunnicliffe (1973–1980) : H. T. Tunnicliffe
- Herbert Turland (1924) : H. Turland
- James Turner (1894) : J. Turner
- Karl Turner (2011–2012) : K. Turner
- Noel Turner (1906–1909) : N. V. C. Turner
- Robert Turner (1906–1927) : R. H. T. Turner
- John Tye (1876–1881) : J. Tye

== U ==
- Arthur Underwood (1949–1954) : A. J. Underwood
- William Underwood (1881) : W. Underwood

== V ==
- Pat Vaulkhard (1934) : P. Vaulkhard
- Daniel Vettori (2003) : D. L. Vettori
- Bill Voce (1927–1952) : W. Voce
- Adam Voges (2008–2012) : A. C. Voges
- Roger Vowles (1957–1961) : R. C. Vowles

== W ==
- Mark Wagh (2007–2011) : M. A. Wagh
- Alan Walker (1954–1958) : A. K. Walker
- George Walker (1937) : G. A. Walker
- Lyndsay Walker (1992–1997) : L. N. P. Walker
- Willis Walker (1913–1937) : W. Walker
- Joseph Walters (1958–1959) : J. A. Walters
- Russell Warren (2003–2006) : R. J. Warren
- Jonas Warwick (1843–1848) : J. B. Warwick
- George Wass (1910) : G. Wass
- Thomas Wass (1896–1920) : T. G. Wass
- Dennis Watkin (1937–1942) : D. Watkin
- Kenny Watson (1976–1980) : W. K. Watson
- Peter Watts (1967) : P. D. Watts
- Neil Weightman (1980–1982) : N. I. Weightman
- Bomber Wells (1960–1965) : B. D. Wells
- Guy Welton (1996–2003) : G. E. Welton
- Riki Wessels (2011–2018) : M. H. Wessels
- Alex Wharf (1998–1999) : A. G. Wharf
- George Wharmby (1891–1893) : G. E. Wharmby
- Arthur Wheat (1927–1944) : A. B. Wheat
- John Wheeler (1873–1877) : J. Wheeler
- Alan Wheelhouse (1961) : A. Wheelhouse
- Matthew Whiley (1998–2000) : M. J. A. Whiley
- Graeme White (2010–2013) : G. G. White
- John White (1902–1904) : J. W. White
- Bob White (1966–1980) : R. A. White
- Barrie Whittingham (1962–1966) : N. B. Whittingham
- William Whysall (1910–1930) : W. W. Whysall
- Sam Weller Widdowson (1878) : S. W. Widdowson
- Jonathan Wileman (1992–1996) : J. R. Wileman
- Arthur Wilkinson (1892–1895) : A. Wilkinson
- Philip Wilkinson (1971–1977) : P. A. Wilkinson
- William Wilkinson (1892–1893) : W. Wilkinson
- Guy Willatt (1939–1948) : G. L. Willatt
- Philip Williams (1845) : P. Williams
- William Williams (1863–1876) : W. Williams
- Herbert Wilson (1911–1919) : H. Wilson
- Mervyn Winfield (1954–1966) : H. M. Winfield
- Harry Winrow (1938–1951) : F. H. Winrow
- Robert Winrow (1932–1935) : R. Winrow
- Arthur Wood (1878) : A. H. Wood
- Luke Wood (2014–2019) : L. Wood
- Matthew Wood (2008–2010) : M. J. Wood
- Maurice Wood (1955) : M. Wood
- Peter Wood (1981) : P. G. Wood
- Sam Wood (2011–2014) : S. K. W. Wood
- Francis Woodhead (1934–1950) : F. G. Woodhead
- George Wootton (1861–1871) : G. Wootton
- Charles Wright (1882–1899) : C. W. Wright
- Mat Wright (1889) : M. W. Wright
- Thomas Wright (1868–1874) : T. Wright
- Walter Wright (1879–1886) : W. Wright
- Frederick Wyld (1868–1881) : F. Wyld

== Y ==
- Walter Yates (1937–1938) : W. G. Yates
- Younis Khan (2005) : Younis Khan

== Bibliography ==
- ACS (1982). A Guide to First-Class Cricket Matches Played in the British Isles. Nottingham: ACS.
