= Oscroft =

Oscroft is a surname. Notable people include:

- Eric Oscroft (1933–2013), English cricketer
- Harry Oscroft (1926–2008), English footballer
- John Oscroft (cricketer, born 1807) (1807–1857), English cricketer
- John Oscroft (cricketer, born 1846) (1846–1885), English cricketer
- Percy Oscroft (1872–1933), English cricketer
- William Oscroft (1843–1905), English cricketer
