= John Oscroft =

John Oscroft may refer to:

- John Oscroft (cricketer, born 1807) (1807–1857), English cricketer
- John Oscroft (cricketer, born 1846) (1846–1885), English cricketer
