= Alexander McDougall (disambiguation) =

Alexander McDougall (1732–1786) was an American seaman, merchant and military leader during the Revolutionary War.

Alexander McDougall or MacDougall may also refer to:

- Alexander McDougall (ship), an 1898 "whaleback" ship
- Alexander McDougall (ship designer) (1845–1923), Scottish-born American seaman and ship designer
- Alexander of Argyll (died 1310), or Alexander MacDougall, Scottish magnate
- Alexander MacDougall (cricketer) (1837–1917), English cricketer
