= Winrow =

Winrow is an English-language surname which may refer to:

- Craig Winrow (born 1971), English middle-distance runner
- Harry Winrow (1916–1973), English cricketer
- Jason Winrow (1971–2012), American football offensive guard
- Robert Winrow (1910–1999), Scottish cricketer
