= Edwin Marshall =

Edwin Marshall may refer to:

- Edwin Marshall (cricketer) (1904–1970), English cricketer
- Eddie Marshall (1938–2011), American jazz drummer

== See also ==
- Edwin Marshall & Sons, English company, builder of Trafford Town Hall in 1931–1933
- Roy Marshall (Roy Edwin Marshall, 1930–1992), West Indian cricketer
- Edward Marshall (disambiguation)
