= GIE (disambiguation) =

GIE may refer to:

- Gie, a 2005 Indonesian film
- Government-in-exile (GiE)
- Groupement d'intérêt économique, a type of French business consortium
- Noel Gie (born 1977), South African cricketer
- Stefanus Gie, (1884–1945), South African diplomat.
