= Arthur Bates =

Arthur Bates may refer to:

- Arthur L. Bates (1859–1934), U.S. representative from Pennsylvania
- Arthur Bates (cricketer) (1852–1925), English cricketer
- Arthur W. Bates (1883–1972), American silent film actor
- Arthur Bates (1881-1992), British-born New Zealand supercentenarian, and oldest known man ever in New Zealand
