= Arthur Ashwell =

Arthur Ashwell may refer to:

- Arthur Ashwell (Nottinghamshire cricketer) (1853–1925), English cricketer
- Arthur Ashwell (Kent cricketer) (1908–1985), English cricketer
- Arthur Rawson Ashwell (1824–1879), canon residentiary of Chichester
