= Albert Payton =

English cricketer

Personal information
- Full name: Albert Ivan Payton
- Born: 20 January 1898; Stapleford, Nottinghamshire, England
- Died: 27 September 1967 (aged 69); Sandiacre, Derbyshire, England
- Batting: Right-handed
- Bowling: Right-arm medium
- Relatives: Wilfred Payton, Sr. (brother); Wilfred Payton, Jr. (nephew)

Domestic team information
- Years: Team
- 1922: Nottinghamshire

Career statistics
Competition	First-class
Matches	1
Runs scored	16
Batting average	8.00
100s/50s	–/–
Top score	15
Balls bowled	–
Wickets	–
Bowling average	–
5 wickets in innings	–
10 wickets in match	–
Best bowling	–
Catches/stumpings	–/–
- Source: Cricinfo, 22 February 2013

Albert Ivan Payton (20 January 1898 – 27 September 1967) was an English cricketer. Payton was a right-handed batsman who bowled right-arm medium pace. He was born in Stapleford, Nottinghamshire.

Payton made a single first-class appearance for Nottinghamshire against Lancashire at Lod Trafford in the 1922 County Championship. He scored 15 runs in Nottinghamshire's first-innings of 226 all out, before being dismissed by Dick Tyldesley, while in their second-innings of 62 all out, he was dismissed for a single run by Lawrence Cook. Lancashire won Payton's only first-class appearance by an innings and 108 runs.

He died at Sandiacre, Derbyshire on 27 September 1967. His brother Wilfred Payton Sr. and nephew Wilfred Payton Jr. both played first-class cricket.
