= Joseph Knowles =

Joseph Knowles may refer to:

- Joe Knowles, Australian soccer player
- Joe Knowles (footballer, born 1872), English footballer
- Joseph Knowles (cricketer), English cricketer
