= Blagg =

Blagg may refer to:

- Blagg (surname), an English surname
- Blagg (crater), a lunar crater
