= Joseph Walters =

Joseph or Joe Walters may refer to:

- Joe Walters (born 1984), American lacrosse player
- Joe Walters (English footballer) (1886–1923), English football player (Aston Villa, Oldham Athletic)
- Joe Walters (Scottish footballer) (1935–2017), Scottish football player (Clyde FC)
- Joe Walters (cricketer) (born 1940), English cricket player (Nottinghamshire)
- Joseph Walters (politician) (fl. 1916–1920), member of the 14th Parliament of British Columbia
- Joe C. "J.C." Walters, Jr (died 1997), Texas oilman & philanthropist, namesake of the J.C. Walters, Jr. Transplant Center in Houston, Texas
