= Charles Clifton =

Charles Clifton may refer to:

- Charles Clifton, 11th Earl of Loudoun or Charles Rawdon-Hastings, 11th Earl of Loudoun (1855–1920)
- Charles Clifton (cricketer) (1846–unknown), English cricketer
- Charles E. Clifton (1904–1976), American microbiologist
