= Kesteven (surname) =

Kesteven is a surname, and may refer to:

- Charles Kesteven (died 1923), British government law officer in India
- Hereward Kesteven (1881–1964), Australian medical scientist
- John Kesteven (1849–unknown), English cricketer

== See also ==
- Kesteven
