= William Underwood =

William Underwood may refer to:

== People ==
- A. W. Underwood (1855–?), American man purported to have pyrokinetic abilities
- William Lyman Underwood (1864–1929), American photographer
- William D. Underwood, American university president
- William Underwood (cricketer) (1852–1914), English cricketer

== Other uses ==
- William Underwood Company, American food company
