= Noel Turner =

Noel Turner may refer to:

- Noel Turner (cricketer) (1887–1941), English first-class cricketer
- Noel Turner (footballer) (born 1974), Maltese former footballer
