= Frederick Stinchcombe =

English cricketer

Personal information
- Full name: Frederick William Stinchcombe
- Born: 12 March 1930; Barnby Moor, Nottinghamshire, England
- Died: 19 September 1984 (aged 54); Worksop, Nottinghamshire, England
- Batting: Right-handed
- Bowling: Leg break googly

Domestic team information
- Years: Team
- 1950–1951: Nottinghamshire

Career statistics
Competition	First-class
Matches	6
Runs scored	87
Batting average	14.50
100s/50s	–/–
Top score	48
Balls bowled	771
Wickets	4
Bowling average	134.75
5 wickets in innings	–
10 wickets in match	–
Best bowling	1/42
Catches/stumpings	1/–
- Source: Cricinfo, 19 May 2012

Frederick William Stinchcombe (12 March 1930 – 19 September 1984) was an English cricketer. Stinchcombe was a right-handed batsman who bowled leg break googly. He was born at Barnby Moor, Nottinghamshire.

Stinchcombe made his first-class debut for Nottinghamshire against Hampshire in the 1950 County Championship. He made five further first-class appearances for the county, the last of which came against Kent in the 1951 County Championship. In his six first-class appearances for the county, he scored 87 runs at an average of 14.50, with a high score of 48. With the ball, he took 4 wickets at an expensive bowling average of 134.75, with best figures of 1/42.

He died at Worksop, Nottinghamshire, on 19 September 1984.
