= Fewkes =

Fewkes is a surname. It can refer to:

== People ==
- Alfred Fewkes (1837—1912), English cricketer
- Jesse Walter Fewkes (1850—1930), US anthropologist, archaeologist, writer, and naturalist
- John Fewkes (boxer), professional boxer and trainer
- John M. Fewkes (1901—1992), founding president of the Chicago Teachers Union

== Places ==
- Fewkes Canyon, valley in Montezuma County, Colorado
- Fewkes Canyon, valley in Summit County, Utah
- Fewkes Group Archaeological Site in Tennessee, named in Jesse Walter Fewkes honor
