= George Power =

George Power may refer to:

- Sir George Power, 7th Baronet (1846–1928), operatic tenor
- George Power (cricketer) (1849–1904), English cricketer
- George Power (priest) (died 1950), Dean of Ardfert, 1918–1924
- George Power (footballer) (1910–1977), English footballer
