= Truswell =

Truswell is a surname. Notable people with the name include:

- Christopher Truswell (born 1966), English-born Australian actor, musician and voice-over
- Elizabeth Truswell (born 1941), former Chief Scientist at the Australian Geological Survey Organisation
- John Truswell (1841–1892), English cricketer
- Paul Truswell (born 1955), English Labour Party politician
