= Gauld =

Gauld is a Scottish surname, originating from Aberdeenshire, and a sept of Clan MacDonald.

Famous Gaulds

- George Gauld (aviator) (died 1964), Canadian World War I flying ace
- George Gauld (surveyor) (1731–1782), British military engineer, cartographer and surveyor
- George Gauld (cricketer) (1873–1950), English cricketer
- Jimmy Gauld, former Scottish footballer
- Stuart Gauld, former Scottish footballer
- Tom Gauld, Scottish illustrator and cartoonist
- Ryan Gauld, Scottish footballer
