= Flear =

Flear is an English surname. Notable people with the surname include:

- Christine Flear (born 1967), French chess player
- Glenn Flear (born 1959), British chess player
- Henry Flear (1818–1852), English cricketer
