= William Henson =

William Henson may refer to:

- William Henson (Australian politician) (1826–1903), New South Wales politician
- William Samuel Henson (1812–1888), English aviator
- William Henson (cricketer) (1872–1922), English cricketer
- William Henson (wrestler), British Olympic wrestler
- William Parker Henson (1905–1999), Australian local government representative
