= Alan Armitage =

English cricketer (1930–2025)

Personal information
- Full name: Alan Kenneth Armitage
- Born: 25 January 1930; Nottingham, Nottinghamshire, England
- Died: 30 September 2025 (aged 95); Oxenhope, Yorkshire, England
- Batting: Right-handed
- Role: Occasional wicket-keeper

Domestic team information
- Years: Team
- 1951: Oxford University
- 1950–1951: Nottinghamshire

Career statistics
Competition	First-class
Matches	7
Runs scored	348
Batting average	34.80
100s/50s	1/1
Top score	115
Balls bowled	–
Wickets	–
Bowling average	–
5 wickets in innings	–
10 wickets in match	–
Best bowling	–
Catches/stumpings	3/–
- Source: Cricinfo, 13 November 2011

Alan Kenneth Armitage (25 January 1930 – 30 September 2025) was an English first-class cricketer. Armitage was a right-handed batsman who occasionally fielded as a wicket-keeper. He was born at Nottingham, Nottinghamshire.

Armitage made his first-class debut for Nottinghamshire against Warwickshire in the 1950 County Championship. He played a further match that season against Hampshire. In 1951, he made a single first-class appearance for his home county against Oxford University, where incidentally he himself was also studying. In that same season he made two first-class appearances for the university, against the Free Foresters and Leicestershire. In the match against the Free Foresters he scored his only first-class century, making 155 runs in the university's first-innings, while in their second-innings he followed this up with an unbeaten 57. Two appearances in July in the 1951 County Championship against Somerset and Yorkshire were to be his final first-class appearances. Playing against Yorkshire, he was part of a Fred Trueman hat-trick, with the then future England Test cricketer taking the wickets of Reg Simpson, Armitage and Peter Harvey. Overall, Armitage scored 348 runs in first-class cricket, which came at an average of 34.80.
