= Benjamin Gregory =

Benjamin Gregory may refer to:

- Benjamin Gregory (decathlete)
- Benjamin Gregory (cricketer)

== See also ==
- Ben Gregory, American football player
