= Arthur Bennett =

Arthur Bennett can refer to:

- Arthur Bennett (English cricketer) (1868–1899), English cricketer
- Arthur Bennett (New Zealand cricketer) (1884–1918), New Zealand cricketer
