= Benjamin Blackburn =

Benjamin Blackburn may refer to:

- Benjamin B. Blackburn (born 1927), former U.S. Representative from Georgia
- Benjamin Blackburn (cricketer) (1855–1907), English cricketer
