= William Marriott =

William Marriott may refer to:

- William Marriott (engineer) (1857–1943), engineer and locomotive superintendent
- William Marriott (baseball) (1893–1969), baseball player, 1917–1927
- William Marriott (magician) (ca. 1910), British magician and psychic debunker
- William Thackeray Marriott (1834–1903), MP
- William Hammond Marriott (1790–1851), American politician in the Maryland House of Delegates
- William Marriott (cricketer) (1850–1887), English cricketer
- Bill Marriott (footballer) (1880–1944), English footballer

== See also ==
- Bill Marriott (born 1932), American businessman
