= John Parkin =

John Parkin may refer to:

- John B. Parkin (1911–1975), Canadian architect and partner of John C. Parkin (no relation)
- John C. Parkin (1922–1988), Canadian architect and partner of John B. Parkin (no relation)
- John Parkin (Wisconsin politician) (1918–2003), American businessman and politician
- John Parkin (cricketer) (born 1944), English cricketer

== See also ==
- Jon Parkin (born 1981), English footballer
- Jonty Parkin (1894–1972), English rugby league player
