= Walter Yates =

Walter Yates may refer to:

- Walter Yates (cricketer) (1919–2008), English cricketer
- Walter Baldwyn Yates, English barrister and member of the London County Council
- Walter H. Yates Jr. (born 1941), retired United States Army officer
