= Bryan Farr =

English cricketer

Personal information
- Full name: Bryan Henry Farr
- Born: 16 March 1924; Nottingham, Nottinghamshire, England
- Died: 20 May 2017 (aged 93); Worksop, Nottinghamshire, England
- Height: 6 ft 4 in (1.93 m)
- Batting: Right-handed
- Bowling: Right-arm medium

Domestic team information
- Years: Team
- 1949–1951: Nottinghamshire

Career statistics
Competition	First-class
Matches	7
Runs scored	143
Batting average	14.30
100s/50s	–/–
Top score	37
Balls bowled	846
Wickets	10
Bowling average	53.80
5 wickets in innings	1
10 wickets in match	–
Best bowling	5/96
Catches/stumpings	2/–
- Source: Cricinfo, 19 May 2012

Bryan Henry Farr (16 March 1924 – 20 May 2017) was an English cricketer and landowner. Farr was a right-handed batsman who bowled right-arm medium pace. He was born at Nottingham, Nottinghamshire, and was educated at Harrow School.

Farr made his first-class debut for Nottinghamshire against Gloucestershire in the 1949 County Championship. He made five further first-class appearances for the county, the last of which came against Derbyshire in the 1951 County Championship. In his six first-class appearances for the county, he scored 127 runs at an average of 15.87, with a high score of 37. With the ball, he took 10 wickets at a bowling average of 48.50, with best figures of 5/96. These figures were his only five wicket haul and came against Worcestershire in 1951. He played a final first-class match in 1952 for the Free Foresters against Cambridge University, going wicketless and being dismissed twice by Raman Subba Row, with the Free Foresters losing the match by an innings and 86 runs.
