= Kenneth Poole =

English cricketer

Personal information
- Full name: Kenneth John Poole
- Born: 27 April 1934 (age 92); Thurgarton, Nottinghamshire, England
- Batting: Right-handed
- Bowling: Right-arm medium fast
- Role: All-rounder

Domestic team information
- Years: Team
- 1955–1957: Nottinghamshire

Career statistics
Competition	First-class
Matches	26
Runs scored	612
Batting average	15.69
100s/50s	–/2
Top score	58
Balls bowled	2,386
Wickets	21
Bowling average	64.80
5 wickets in innings	–
10 wickets in match	–
Best bowling	2/10
Catches/stumpings	21/–
- Source: CricketArchive, 13 November 2024

Kenneth John Poole (born 27 April 1934 in Thurgarton) is an English former first-class cricketer who played for Nottinghamshire from 1955 to 1957.

== See also ==
- List of Nottinghamshire County Cricket Club players
