= Eric Oscroft =

English cricketer

Personal information
- Full name: Eric Oscroft
- Born: 20 April 1933; Sutton-in-Ashfield, Nottinghamshire, England
- Died: 8 November 2013 (aged 80); Nottinghamshire, England
- Batting: Right-handed
- Bowling: Left-arm fast-medium

Domestic team information
- Years: Team
- 1950–1951: Nottinghamshire

Career statistics
Competition	First-class
Matches	9
Runs scored	8
Batting average	1.60
100s/50s	–/–
Top score	7*
Balls bowled	1,239
Wickets	13
Bowling average	54.38
5 wickets in innings	–
10 wickets in match	–
Best bowling	4/88
Catches/stumpings	1/–
- Source: Cricinfo, 26 May 2012

Eric Oscroft (20 April 1933 – 8 November 2013) was an English cricketer. Oscroft was a right-handed batsman who bowled left-arm fast-medium. He was born at Sutton-in-Ashfield, Nottinghamshire.

Oscroft made his first-class debut for Nottinghamshire against Warwickshire at Trent Bridge in the 1950 County Championship. He made eight further first-class appearances for the county, the last of which came against Surrey at The Oval in the 1951 County Championship. In his nine first-class appearances for Nottinghamshire, he took 13 wickets at an average of 54.38, with best figures of 4/88. With the bat, he scored a total of 8 runs at an average of 1.60, with a high score of 7 not out.
