= Edwin Mills (cricketer) =

English cricketer

Personal information
- Born: 6 March 1857; Coddington, Nottinghamshire
- Died: 25 January 1899 (aged 41); Cossall, Nottinghamshire
- Source: Cricinfo, 13 March 2017

Edwin Mills (6 March 1857 – 25 January 1899) was an English cricketer. He played 43 first-class matches for Nottinghamshire and Surrey between 1878 and 1887.

== See also ==
- List of Nottinghamshire County Cricket Club players
- List of Surrey County Cricket Club players
