= John Hodgkins (cricketer) =

English cricketer

Personal information
- Full name: John Seymour Hodgkins
- Born: 2 January 1916; West Bridgford, Nottinghamshire, England
- Died: 16 August 1988 (aged 72); Stanton-on-the-Wolds, Nottinghamshire, England
- Batting: Right-handed
- Bowling: Right-arm medium

Domestic team information
- Years: Team
- 1938–1951: Nottinghamshire

Career statistics
Competition	First-class
Matches	3
Runs scored	106
Batting average	21.20
100s/50s	–/–
Top score	44
Balls bowled	348
Wickets	3
Bowling average	79.33
5 wickets in innings	–
10 wickets in match	–
Best bowling	1/55
Catches/stumpings	–/–
- Source: Cricinfo, 3 May 2014

John Seymour Hodgkins (2 January 1916 – 16 August 1988) was an English cricketer active in the late 1930s, mid 1940s and early 1950s. Born at West Bridgford, Nottinghamshire, Hodgkins was a right-handed batsman and right-arm medium pace bowler.

Hodgkins made his debut in first-class cricket for Nottinghamshire against Lancashire in the 1938 County Championship, having been called up to replace the injured Arthur Jepson. He was excluded from service in World War II due a hearing impediment, which allowed him to play wartime county cricket. His next appearance in first-class cricket came after the war in 1946 against Surrey, before playing a third and final first-class match against Yorkshire in the 1951 County Championship, a match which also served as Jepson's benefit match, one which Hodgkins played in by way of an invite. He scored 109 runs in his three matches, top-scoring with 44, while with the ball he took three wickets.

He died at Stanton-on-the-Wolds, Nottinghamshire on 16 August 1988.
