= Blagg (surname) =

Blagg is an English surname and it may refer to:

- Alicia Blagg (born 1996), English diver
- Curtis Blagg, American IT Specialist
- Edward Blagg (1918–1976), English cricketer
- Mary Adela Blagg (1858–1944), English astronomer
- Max Blagg, English poet
- Paul Blagg (born 1960), English race walker

== Fictional characters ==
- Temiri Blagg, a minor character in the film Star Wars: Episode VIII - The Last Jedi
