= Pasty Harris =

English cricketer (1944–2025)

Personal information
- Full name: Michael John Harris
- Born: 25 May 1944; St Just in Roseland, Cornwall, England
- Died: c. 18 July 2025 (aged 81)
- Nickname: Pasty
- Batting: Right-handed
- Bowling: Legbreak

Domestic team information
- Years: Team
- 1964–1968: Middlesex
- 1969–1982: Nottinghamshire
- 1971/72: Eastern Province
- 1975/76: Wellington

Umpiring information
- WODIs umpired: 3 (2000–2006)
- FC umpired: 161 (1988–2008)
- LA umpired: 171 (1985–2008)
- T20 umpired: 33 (2003–2008)

Career statistics
| Competition | First-class | List A |
|---|---|---|
| Matches | 344 | 225 |
| Runs scored | 19,196 | 4,882 |
| Batting average | 36.70 | 29.95 |
| 100s/50s | 41/98 | 3/26 |
| Top score | 201* | 104* |
| Balls bowled | 6,345 | 94 |
| Wickets | 79 | 4 |
| Bowling average | 43.78 | 21.75 |
| 5 wickets in innings | 0 | 0 |
| 10 wickets in match | 0 | 0 |
| Best bowling | 4/16 | 2/24 |
| Catches/stumpings | 288/14 | 139/6 |
- Source: CricInfo, 18 May 2017

Michael John "Pasty" Harris (25 May 1944 – c. 18 July 2025) was an English first-class cricketer who played for various teams. He played from 1964 until 1982 in a 344-game first-class career which took him to South Africa and New Zealand.

== Early life ==
Harris was born in St Just in Roseland, Cornwall, in 1944. His nickname of "Pasty" referred to his Cornish origins.

== Playing career ==
In England, Harris represented Nottinghamshire, for whom he scored over 15,000 runs, and Middlesex County Cricket Club, playing as a right-handed batsman and, from 1969 until around 1972, as a useful leg-spinbowler. From 1974 to 1977, Nottinghamshire used him as their wicketkeeper, as David Pullan, the incumbent, was a poor batsman. Harris hit nine centuries, equalling the county record, in 1971 when he scored 2238 runs.

In 1974, Harris was selected to tour Rhodesia with the International Wanderers, a private touring team organised by Brian Close.

A prolific batsman in county cricket, Harris was selected on standby for the 1974–75 Ashes tour but Colin Cowdrey was called into the squad in his place.

== Umpiring career ==
Harris later became an umpire, officiating at List A level from 1985 to 2008 and at First class level from 1988 to 2008. He officiated in 161 first-class matches, 171 List A and 33 T20.

== Death ==
On 18 July 2025, it was announced that Harris had died at the age of 81.
