= Arthur Underwood =

English cricketer

Personal information
- Full name: Arthur Joseph Underwood
- Born: 21 September 1927; Wiseton, Nottinghamshire, England
- Died: 29 June 2016 (aged 88); Worksop, Nottinghamshire, England
- Source: Cricinfo, 17 September 2016

Arthur Underwood (21 September 1927 – 29 June 2016) was an English cricketer. He played sixteen first-class matches for Nottinghamshire between 1949 and 1954.

== See also ==
- List of Nottinghamshire County Cricket Club players
