= Tom Reddick =

English cricketer and coach (1912–1982)

Personal information
- Full name: Tom Bokenham Reddick
- Born: 17 February 1912; Shanghai, China
- Died: 1 June 1982 (aged 70); Cape Town, South Africa
- Batting: Right-handed
- Bowling: Right-arm leg-spin

Domestic team information
- Years: Team
- 1931: Middlesex
- 1932 to 1938: Sir Julien Cahn’s XI
- 1946 to 1947: Nottinghamshire
- 1950–51: Western Province

Career statistics
Competition	First-class
Matches	62
Runs scored	2688
Batting average	30.54
100s/50s	2/16
Top score	139
Balls bowled	782
Wickets	6
Bowling average	78.00
5 wickets in innings	0
10 wickets in match	0
Best bowling	1/4
Catches/stumpings	16/–
- Source: Cricinfo, 18 June 2016

Tom Bokenham Reddick (17 February 1912 – 1 June 1982) was an English cricketer who played for Middlesex, Nottinghamshire and Western Province. He was born in Shanghai and died in Cape Town.

Reddick appeared in 62 first-class matches between 1931 and 1950 as a right-handed batsman who bowled occasional leg breaks. Most of his cricket in the 1930s was for Sir Julien Cahn's XI. His only full seasons of county cricket were for Nottinghamshire in 1946 and 1947. In 1947, when he played as an amateur and was county coach, he captained the side against Kent and made his highest score, 139, adding 244 for the fifth wicket with Harry Winrow.

After his playing career finished, Reddick coached Lancashire for two seasons before settling in South Africa, where he became a prominent coach; "his flair as a teacher of the game unearthed and developed the talents of countless young players who later made their mark". Basil D'Oliveira was one of the young players he coached. For some years he wrote a weekly column for the Cape Times, "combining shrewd and constructive criticism with a delightful sense of humour". In 1979 he wrote his autobiography, titled Never a Cross Bat.
