= John Atkinson (cricketer) =

English cricketer

Personal information
- Full name: John Atkinson
- Born: 7 June 1878; Eastwood, Nottinghamshire, England
- Died: 20 November 1951 (aged 73); Bentley with Arksey, Yorkshire, England
- Batting: Left-handed
- Bowling: Slow left-arm orthodox
- Relatives: Frederick Wyld (uncle)

Domestic team information
- Years: Team
- 1899–1901: Nottinghamshire

Career statistics
Competition	First-class
Matches	7
Runs scored	40
Batting average	5.00
100s/50s	–/–
Top score	19
Balls bowled	488
Wickets	10
Bowling average	23.60
5 wickets in innings	–
10 wickets in match	–
Best bowling	4/22
Catches/stumpings	1/–
- Source: Cricinfo, 23 February 2013

John Atkinson (7 June 1878 – 20 November 1951) was an English first-class cricketer. Atkinson was a left-handed batsman who bowled slow left-arm orthodox. He was born at Eastwood, Nottinghamshire.

Atkinson made his first-class debut for Nottinghamshire against the Marylebone Cricket Club at Lord's in 1899. The following season he made three first-class appearances in the 1900 County Championship against Yorkshire, Derbyshire and Lancashire. He made three further first-class appearances in 1901, against the Marylebone Cricket Club, Gloucestershire in the County Championship and the touring South Africans. In his seven first-class matches he took 10 wickets at an average of 42.50, with best figures of 1/28. With the bat, he scored a total of 40 runs in at a batting average of 5.00 and a high score of 19. He played six matches for Todmorden Cricket Club in the Lancashire League in 1902.

He died at Bentley with Arksey, Yorkshire on 20 November 1951. His uncle Frederick Wyld also played first-class cricket.
