= Roy Dexter =

English cricketer (born 1955)

Personal information
- Full name: Roy Evatt Dexter
- Born: 13 April 1955 (age 71); Nottingham, Nottinghamshire, England
- Batting: Right-handed
- Role: Batter

Domestic team information
- Years: Team
- 1975–1981: Nottinghamshire

Career statistics
| Competition | First-class | List A |
|---|---|---|
| Matches | 22 | 4 |
| Runs scored | 464 | 64 |
| Batting average | 15.46 | 21.33 |
| 100s/50s | 0/1 | 0/0 |
| Top score | 55 | 37* |
| Catches/stumpings | 23/– | 0/– |
- Source: CricketArchive, 18 October 2024

Roy Evatt Dexter (born 13 April 1955) is an English former first-class cricketer who played for Nottinghamshire between 1975 and 1981. He was born at Nottingham.

== See also ==
- List of Nottinghamshire County Cricket Club players
