= Peter Wood (cricketer) =

English cricketer (1951–2022)

Personal information
- Born: 29 September 1951; Manchester, Lancashire, England
- Died: 26 January 2022 (aged 70); Australia
- Batting: Right-handed
- Bowling: Right-arm medium

Domestic team information
- Years: Team
- 1968-75: Rawtenstall Cricket Club
- 1975: Walshaw Cricket Club
- 1976-81: Rawtenstall Cricket Club
- 1981-82: Nottinghamshire County Cricket Club
- 1982: Norden Cricket Club
- 1982-83: Cumberland County Cricket Club
- 1983: Blackburn Northern Cricket Club
- 1983-96: Rawtenstall Cricket Club

Peter George Wood (29 September 1951 in Manchester – 26 January 2022) was an English first-class cricketer active in 1981 who played 29 seasons for Rawtenstall Cricket Club.

He was active in the Lancashire League and was the all-time leading run-maker for Rawtenstall.

Wood died suddenly in Australia on 26 January 2022, at the age of 70.
