= Isaac Harrison =

English cricketer

Personal information
- Full name: Isaac Marshall Harrison
- Born: 8 June 1880; Calverton, Nottinghamshire, England
- Died: 25 February 1909 (aged 28); Calverton, Nottinghamshire, England
- Batting: Unknown

Domestic team information
- Years: Team
- 1901: Nottinghamshire

Career statistics
Competition	First-class
Matches	7
Runs scored	143
Batting average	14.30
100s/50s	–/–
Top score	33
Balls bowled	–
Wickets	–
Bowling average	–
5 wickets in innings	–
10 wickets in match	–
Best bowling	–
Catches/stumpings	1/–
- Source: Cricinfo, 23 May 2012

Isaac Marshall Harrison (8 June 1880 – 25 February 1909) was an English cricketer. Harrison's batting style is unknown. He was born at Calverton, Nottinghamshire.

Harrison made his first-class debut for Nottinghamshire against Middlesex at Lord's in the 1901 County Championship. He made six further first-class appearances in that season for the county, the last of which came against Lancashire at Old Trafford. In his seven first-class appearances for the county, he scored a total of 143 runs at an average of 14.30, with a high score of 33.

He died at the village of his birth on 25 February 1909, following ill-health which had led him to give up playing cricket.
