= Cecil Clifton =

English cricketer

Cecil Cooper Clifton (8 December 1885 – 12 March 1930) was an English first-class cricketer active 1908–10 who played for Nottinghamshire. He was born in Eastwood, Nottinghamshire; died in Anfield, Liverpool.
