= John Oscroft (cricketer, born 1846) =

English cricketer (1846–1885)

Personal information
- Full name: John Thomas Oscroft
- Born: 24 March 1846; Arnold, Nottinghamshire
- Died: 15 June 1885 (aged 39); Arnold, Nottinghamshire
- Batting: Right-handed
- Bowling: Right-arm fast

Domestic team information
- Years: Team
- 1867–1874: Nottinghamshire

Career statistics
Competition	First-class
Matches	18
Runs scored	244
Batting average	7.87
100s/50s	0/1
Top score	51
Balls bowled	432
Wickets	3
Bowling average	53.33
5 wickets in innings	0
10 wickets in match	0
Best bowling	1/6
Catches/stumpings	10/0
- Source: CricketArchive, 7 May 2016

John Thomas Oscroft (24 March 1846 – 15 June 1885) was an English cricketer who played first-class cricket for Nottinghamshire between 1867 and 1874. He was the brother of William Oscroft, who later captained Nottinghamshire from 1881 to 1882.

== Career ==
Oscroft was a batsman, who occasionally bowled roundarm fast. Oscroft made his first-class debut in 1867, as a replacement for the injured George Parr. It was a county match between Nottinghamshire and Middlesex, and Oscroft made scores of 0 and 3. In 1868, Oscroft made an appearance for Beeston Cricket Club against Wirksworth Cricket Club. Oscroft score 0 opening the batting, ad took two wickets. The following year, Oscroft represented the All England Eleven along with his brother William; the match against a United All England Eleven was in benefit of George Anderson, and was heavily rain-affected. Oscroft did not bat or bowl, although he took a catch to dismiss George Summers. Oscroft also played professional cricket for Wellington College, and in 1872, Oscroft umpired a one-day match between Accrington and Burnley. He also played club cricket in Lancashire and Yorkshire.

== Personal life ==
Oscroft was born on 24 March 1846, in Arnold, Nottinghamshire, England. He was the brother of William Oscroft, who later captained Nottinghamshire. Aside from cricket, he owned a pub in Arnold. He died on 15 June 1885 of liver cirrhosis.
