= Thomas Simpson (cricketer) =

English cricketer (1879–1961)

Personal information
- Full name: Thomas Simpson
- Born: 13 August 1879; Keyworth, Nottinghamshire, England
- Died: 19 December 1961 (aged 82); Oldham, Lancashire, England
- Batting: Left-handed
- Bowling: Left-arm medium

Domestic team information
- Years: Team
- 1903–1905: Nottinghamshire

Career statistics
Competition	First-class
Matches	5
Runs scored	38
Batting average	5.42
100s/50s	–/–
Top score	14
Balls bowled	186
Wickets	2
Bowling average	42.50
5 wickets in innings	–
10 wickets in match	–
Best bowling	1/28
Catches/stumpings	–/–
- Source: Cricinfo, 23 February 2013

Thomas Simpson (13 August 1879 – 19 December 1961) was an English cricketer. Simpson was a left-handed batsman who bowled left-arm medium pace. He was born at Keyworth, Nottinghamshire.

Simpson made his first-class debut for Nottinghamshire against Yorkshire at Headingley in the 1903 County Championship. The following season he made two first-class appearances in the 1904 County Championship against Gloucestershire and Middlesex, while the following season he made a further two first-class appearances against the Marylebone Cricket Club and the touring Australians. He scored a total of 38 runs in his five matches, at an average of 5.42 and a high score of 14. With the ball he took 2 wickets at a bowling average of 42.50, with best figures of 1/28.

He died at Oldham, Lancashire on 19 December 1961.
