= George Banner =

English cricketer

George Banner (21 January 1864 – 20 March 1890) was an English cricketer. He was a right-handed batsman and a right-arm fast bowler who played for Nottinghamshire. He was born and died in Sutton-in-Ashfield.

Banner made a single first-class appearance for the team in the 1885 season, against Gloucestershire. Banner's sole batting contribution was a first-innings of five runs. He bowled sixteen overs, making figures of 2-33.

Banner died at the age of just 26.
