= Joseph Need =

English cricketer (1819–1892)

Joseph Stanley Need (22 February 1819 – 25 August 1892) was an English first-class cricketer active 1841–55 who played for Nottinghamshire. He was born in Nottingham and died in Dunkirk, Nottinghamshire. He played in two first-class matches.
