= Andrew Oram =

English cricketer

Personal information
- Full name: Andrew Richard Oram
- Born: 7 March 1975 (age 51); Northampton, Northamptonshire, England
- Batting: Right-handed
- Bowling: Right-arm medium

Domestic team information
- Years: Team
- 2009: Bedfordshire
- 1997–1998: Nottinghamshire

Career statistics
Competition	FC	LA
Matches	19	20
Runs scored	53	1
Batting average	3.53	1.00
100s/50s	–/–	–/–
Top score	13	1*
Balls bowled	3,195	887
Wickets	57	23
Bowling average	29.00	31.17
5 wickets in innings	–	–
10 wickets in match	–	–
Best bowling	4/37	4/45
Catches/stumpings	6/–	5/–
- Source: Cricinfo, 29 September 2010

Andrew Richard Oram (born 7 March 1975) is a former English cricketer. Oram was a right-handed batsman who bowled right-arm medium pace. He was born in Northampton, Northamptonshire.

Oram made his first-class debut for Nottinghamshire against the touring Australians in 1997. From 1997 to 1998, he represented the county in 19 first-class matches, the last of which came against Gloucestershire in the County Championship. In his 19 first-class matches, he took 57 wickets at a bowling average of 29.00, with best figures of 4/37.

His List-A debut for Nottinghamshire came against Derbyshire in 1997. From 1997 to 1998, he represented the county in 20 List-A matches, the last of which came against Lancashire. In his 20 List-A matches for the county he took 33 wickets at an average of 31.17, with best figures of 4/45.

In 2009, Oram represented Bedfordshire in a single Minor Counties Championship match against Cumberland.
