= Samuel Brown (cricketer) =

English cricketer

Samuel Brown (26 February 1857 – 5 September 1938) was an English first-class cricketer active 1884–97 who played for Nottinghamshire County Cricket Club. He was a right-handed batsman and a right-arm medium pace bowler. He also played for Shropshire and Cheshire in minor counties cricket.

== Early life and career ==
He was born in Kimberley, Nottinghamshire; died in Edgeley near Stockport, Cheshire, aged 81.

He played below first-class level for Shropshire in three matches in 1882–83, and for Cheshire while club professional at Stockport.
