= Harvey Staunton =

English cricketer

Harvey Staunton (21 November 1870 – 14 January 1918) was an English first-class cricketer active 1903–05 who played for Nottinghamshire. He was born in Nottinghamshire; died in Mesopotamia on active service during World War I.
