= Robert Gibson (cricketer, born 1821) =

English cricketer

Robert Gibson (13 March 1821 – 25 September 1875) was an English first-class cricketer who was active from 1855 to 1858 and played for Nottinghamshire. He was born in Nottingham; died in Old Radford.
