= Cecil Sutton =

English cricketer

Cecil Sutton (6 January 1886 — 10 February 1965) was an English cricketer. He was a right-handed batsman and a right-arm medium-pace bowler who played for Nottinghamshire.

Sutton's only first-class appearance came in 1907, against Marylebone Cricket Club. In the only innings in which he batted, he scored one run. He bowled 7 overs in the match, taking figures of 0-26.

Sutton made six appearances for the Second XI in the Minor Counties Championship - four in 1910 and two 15 seasons later.
