= George Paling =

English cricketer

George Paling (29 November 1836 – 18 December 1879) was an English first-class cricketer active 1865–67 who played for Nottinghamshire. He was born and died in Nottingham.
