= John Pennington (cricketer) =

English cricketer

John Henry Pennington (24 June 1881 – 2 January 1942) was an English first-class cricketer active 1902–05 who played for Nottinghamshire. He was born in Sutton-on-Trent; died in Newark, Nottinghamshire.
