= Steven Mee =

English cricketer (born 1965)

Steven Mee (born 6 April 1965) was an English cricketer. He was a right-handed batsman and right-arm medium-pace bowler who played for Nottinghamshire. He was born in Nottingham.

Mee, who played with Nottinghamshire Second XI between 1983 and 1984, made a single first-class appearance for the side, against Cambridge University in 1984. Mee took two wickets in the match but did not bat.
