= Percy Harrison (cricketer) =

English cricketer

Percy Harrison (15 October 1878 – 11 April 1935) was an English first-class cricketer active 1899 who played for Nottinghamshire. He was born in Mansfield; died in Worksop.
