= Henry Enfield =

English cricketer

Personal information
- Full name: Henry Enfield
- Born: 12 September 1849; Hampstead, London, England
- Died: 19 September 1923 (aged 74); Nottingham, Nottinghamshire, England
- Batting: Right-handed

Domestic team information
- Years: Team
- 1869–1872: Nottinghamshire

Career statistics
Competition	First-class
Matches	2
Runs scored	6
Batting average	1.50
100s/50s	–/–
Top score	4
Balls bowled	–
Wickets	–
Bowling average	–
5 wickets in innings	–
10 wickets in match	–
Best bowling	–
Catches/stumpings	3/–
- Source: Cricinfo, 23 May 2012

Henry Enfield (12 September 1849 – 19 September 1923) was an English cricketer. Enfield was a right-handed batsman. He was born at Hampstead, London.

Enfield made two first-class appearances for Nottinghamshire against Yorkshire at Trent Bridge in 1869, and the same opposition at the Prince's Cricket Ground in London in 1872. In his first match, Nottinghamshire won the toss and elected to bat first, making 111 all out, with Enfield opening the batting and being run out for a duck. Yorkshire responded in their first-innings by making just 43 all out. Nottinghamshire then made 204 all out in their second-innings, with Enfield this time batting at number six, where he was dismissed for 2 runs by John West. Yorkshire were dismissed for 171 in their second-innings, handing Nottinghamshire victory by 101 runs. In his second match, Nottinghamshire again won the toss and elected to bat, making 160 all out, with Enfield being dismissed for a duck by Ephraim Lockwood. In response, Yorkshire made 209 all out in their first-innings to gain at 49 run lead. Nottinghamshire then made 173 all out in their second-innings, with Enfield being dismissed by Lockwood for 4 runs. Chasing 124 for victory, Yorkshire fell 6 runs short.

He died at Nottingham, Nottinghamshire, on 19 September 1923.
