= William Kirk (cricketer) =

English cricketer

William Kirk (18 January 1866 — 10 January 1904) was an English cricketer who played for Nottinghamshire. He was born in Radford and died in Hyson Green.

Kirk made a single first-class appearance for the team, against Marylebone Cricket Club. He scored 4 runs in the only innings in which he batted, as the second day of the game was rained off, sending the match to a draw.
