= Tom Rowe (cricketer) =

English cricketer (born 1993)

Thomas Christopher Rowe (born 16 October 1993 in Truro) is an English List A cricketer active since 2013 who has played for Nottinghamshire.
