= William Padley =

English cricketer

Personal information
- Full name: William Padley
- Born: 11 April 1842; Moorgreen, Nottinghamshire, England
- Died: 21 July 1904 (aged 62); Bagthorpe, Nottinghamshire, England
- Batting: Right-handed
- Bowling: Right-arm roundarm medium
- Role: Wicket-keeper

Domestic team information
- Years: Team
- 1876: Nottinghamshire

Career statistics
Competition	First-class
Matches	1
Runs scored	15
Batting average	15.00
100s/50s	–/–
Top score	10
Balls bowled	–
Wickets	–
Bowling average	–
5 wickets in innings	–
10 wickets in match	–
Best bowling	–
Catches/stumpings	–/–
- Source: Cricinfo, 22 February 2013

William Padley (11 April 1842 – 21 July 1904) was an English cricketer. Padley was a right-handed batsman who bowled right-arm roundarm medium, as well as playing as a wicket-keeper. He was born at Moorgreen, Nottinghamshire.

Padley made a single first-class appearance for Nottinghamshire against Gloucestershire at Trent Bridge in 1876. He ended Nottinghamshire's first-innings of 149 all out unbeaten on 5, while in their second-innings of 97 all out he was dismissed for 10 runs by W. G. Grace. Gloucestershire won what was to be his only appearance in first-class cricket by six wickets.

He died at Bagthorpe, Nottinghamshire on 21 July 1904.
