= Hermon Dexter =

English cricketer

Personal information
- Full name: Hermon Walter Dexter
- Born: 2 May 1877; Nottingham, Nottinghamshire, England
- Died: 31 January 1961 (aged 83); Nottingham, Nottinghamshire, England
- Batting: Unknown
- Bowling: Right-arm fast-medium

Domestic team information
- Years: Team
- 1902–1903: Nottinghamshire

Career statistics
Competition	First-class
Matches	10
Runs scored	223
Batting average	20.27
100s/50s	–/–
Top score	38*
Balls bowled	66
Wickets	–
Bowling average	–
5 wickets in innings	–
10 wickets in match	–
Best bowling	–
Catches/stumpings	3/–
- Source: Cricinfo, 23 May 2012

Hermon Walter Dexter (2 May 1877 – 31 January 1961) was an English cricketer. Dexter's batting style is unknown, though it is known he bowled right-arm fast-medium. He was born at Nottingham, Nottinghamshire.

Dexter made his first-class debut for Nottinghamshire against Leicestershire at Aylestone Road, Leicester, in the 1902 County Championship. He made nine further first-class appearances in the following season for the county, the last of which came against Lancashire at Old Trafford. In his ten first-class appearances for Nottinghamshire, he scored a total of 223 runs at an average of 20.27, with a high score of 38 not out. He occasionally bowled, delivering eleven wicketless overs throughout the course of his brief career.

He died at the city of his birth on 31 January 1961.
