= William Selby (cricketer) =

English cricketer

Personal information
- Full name: William Ward Selby
- Born: Unknown; Nottingham, Nottinghamshire, England
- Died: 29 January 1892; Nottingham, Nottinghamshire, England
- Batting: Unknown

Domestic team information
- Years: Team
- 1848: Nottinghamshire

Career statistics
Competition	First-class
Matches	1
Runs scored	28
Batting average	28.00
100s/50s	–/–
Top score	28
Balls bowled	?
Wickets	–
Bowling average	–
5 wickets in innings	–
10 wickets in match	–
Best bowling	–
Catches/stumpings	–/–
- Source: Cricinfo, 20 February 2013

William Ward Selby (unknown – 29 January 1892) was an English cricketer. Selby's batting style is unknown. He was born at Nottingham, Nottinghamshire and was christened there on 6 April 1823.

Selby made a single first-class appearance for Nottinghamshire against Sussex County Cricket Club at Trent Bridge in 1848. He was dismissed for 28 runs in Nottinghamshire's first-innings by James Hodson, with the match ending as a draw.

He died at the city of his birth on 29 January 1892.
