= Francis Noyes =

English cricketer (1814-c.1855)

Francis Noyes (c. 1814 – c. 1855) was an English first-class cricketer active 1842–48 who played for Nottinghamshire. He was born in England and died in California. He played in 21 first-class matches.
