= Joseph Sulley =

English cricketer (1850–1932)

Joseph Sulley (28 May 1850 – 14 February 1932) was an English first-class cricketer active 1880–88 who played for Nottinghamshire. He was born in Arnold, Nottinghamshire; died in Daybrook.
