= William Holmes (English cricketer) =

English cricketer

Personal information
- Full name: William Holmes
- Born: 29 October 1885; Eastwood, Nottinghamshire, England
- Died: 6 December 1951 (aged 66); Doncaster, Yorkshire, England
- Batting: Right-handed
- Bowling: Right-arm medium

Domestic team information
- Years: Team
- 1919: Nottinghamshire

Career statistics
| Competition | First-class |
|---|---|
| Matches | 2 |
| Runs scored | 33 |
| Batting average | 16.50 |
| 100s/50s | –/– |
| Top score | 19 |
| Balls bowled | 288 |
| Wickets | 4 |
| Bowling average | 26.25 |
| 5 wickets in innings | – |
| 10 wickets in match | – |
| Best bowling | 2/50 |
| Catches/stumpings | 1/– |
- Source: Cricinfo, 23 February 2013

William Holmes (29 October 1885 – 6 December 1951) was an English cricketer. Holmes was a right-handed batsman who bowled right-arm medium pace. He was born in Eastwood, Nottinghamshire.

Holmes made two first-class appearances for Nottinghamshire at Trent Bridge in the 1919 County Championship against Yorkshire and Lancashire. He scored a total of 33 runs in his two matches, at an average of 16.50 and a high score of 19. In bowling, he took 4 wickets at a bowling average of 26.25, with best figures of 2/50.

He died in Doncaster on 6 December 1951.
