= Henry Maltby =

English cricketer

Henry Maltby (c. 1818 – 7 April 1869) was an English first-class cricketer active 1842–44 who played for Nottinghamshire. He was born in England and died in Blackheath. He played in five first-class matches.
