= Stanley Richardson =

English cricketer

Stanley Hugh Richardson (2 July 1890 – 24 January 1958), known as "Dick", played first-class cricket for Warwickshire and Nottinghamshire in three matches in 1920 and 1925. He was born at Marston Green, Warwickshire and died at Cambridge, although the death notice in The Times makes it clear that he was ordinarily resident at Lowdham in Nottinghamshire.

Richardson was an amateur right-handed batsman. He appeared in the home and away Warwickshire matches against Kent in 1920 and then in Nottinghamshire's game with Cambridge University in 1925, but in none of these games did he make any impact, and his highest score was an unbeaten 8.
