= Walter Marshall (cricketer) =

English cricketer

Walter Marshall (27 October 1853 – 15 January 1943) was an English first-class cricketer active 1889–91 who played for Nottinghamshire. He was born and died in Nottingham.
