= William Wilkinson (cricketer, born 1859) =

English cricketer

Personal information
- Full name: William Wilkinson
- Born: 5 July 1859; Kimberley, Nottinghamshire, England
- Died: 6 October 1940 (aged 81); Nottingham, Nottinghamshire, England
- Batting: Unknown
- Bowling: Right-arm fast-medium

Domestic team information
- Years: Team
- 1892–1893: Nottinghamshire

Career statistics
| Competition | First-class |
|---|---|
| Matches | 5 |
| Runs scored | 34 |
| Batting average | 6.80 |
| 100s/50s | 0/0 |
| Top score | 16* |
| Balls bowled | 250 |
| Wickets | 5 |
| Bowling average | 26.60 |
| 5 wickets in innings | 0 |
| 10 wickets in match | 0 |
| Best bowling | 3/41 |
| Catches/stumpings | 4/– |
- Source: Cricinfo, 27 May 2012

William Wilkinson (5 July 1859 – 6 October 1940) was an English cricketer. Wilkinson's was a batting style is unknown, though it is known he bowled right-arm fast-medium. He was born at Kimberley, Nottinghamshire.

Wilkinson had told Nottinghamshire that his date of birth was 1869, in order to appear younger so as to persuade Nottinghamshire to take him on. He made his first-class debut for the county against the Marylebone Cricket Club at Lord's in 1892. He made four further first-class appearances for the county, the last of which came against Lancashire at Old Trafford in the 1893 County Championship. In his five first-class appearances, he took 5 wickets at an average of 26.60, with best figures of 3/41. With the bat, he scored a total of 34 runs at an average of 6.80, with a high score of 16 not out.

He died at Nottingham, Nottinghamshire, on 6 October 1940.
