= Wallace Bower =

English cricketer

Wallace Bower (2 January 1895 – 10 February 1971) was an English cricketer. He was a right-handed batsman and right-arm medium-fast bowler who played for Nottinghamshire. He was born in Eastwood and died in Welbeck Colliery Village.

Bower made a single first-class appearance for the side, during the 1914 season, against Marylebone Cricket Club. From the tailend, he scored a duck in the only innings in which he batted.

He bowled 13 overs in the match, taking a single wicket, that of Johnny Douglas.
