= Richard Earle =

English cricketer and cleric

Richard Bethell Earle (4 October 1827 – 2 April 1884) was an English cleric and cricketer.

== Life ==
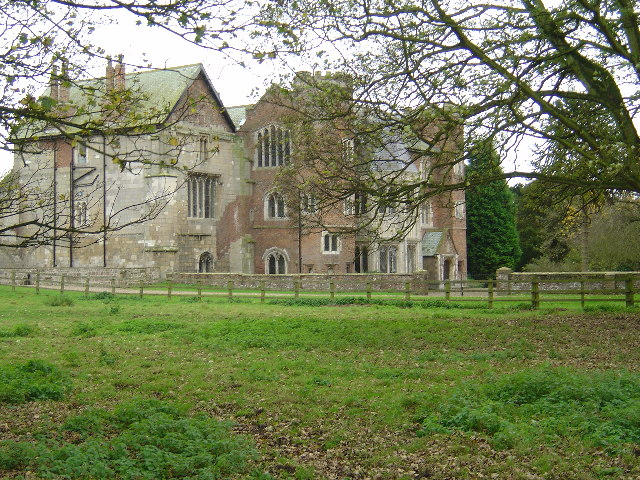
Watton Abbey today

Earle was born in Driffield, the son of the Rev. John Earle. His father ran a school at Watton Abbey, some miles north of Driffield, from 1830 to about 1840.

Recorded in the 1851 census as a theology student in Joseph Baylee's college, Bidston, Earle was ordained in 1852 at St Aidan's College, Birkenhead, by the Archbishop of Canterbury. He went to a curacy in Knockholt, Kent. In 1853 Earle was appointed headmaster of Southwell Collegiate Grammar School.

In 1854 Earle became perpetual curate of Edingley, and in 1858 was he appointed vicar of Barnby in the Willows.

Earle died in Southwell.

== Cricketer ==
Earle was a cricketer who played for Nottinghamshire, taking part in the Notts v Surrey match at Trent Bridge in July 1861. He had taken part in the first match of the Free Foresters Cricket Club, in July 1856, for their opponents the Pilgrims of the Dee. He played for Nottingham County against Free Foresters in 1859 and in 1860, when he scored freely; and for Free Foresters against Gentleman of Notts in 1871. He played for Gentlemen of the North against Gentlemen of the South in 1858, at the Oval.

== Family ==
Earle married in 1871 Julia M. Beaver, daughter of J. A. Beaver.
