= Thomas Wright (cricketer, born 1842) =

English cricketer

Personal information
- Full name: Thomas Wright
- Born: 29 April 1842; Willington, Derbyshire, England
- Died: Unknown
- Batting: Right-handed
- Bowling: Right-arm roundarm slow-medium

Domestic team information
- Years: Team
- 1868–1874: Nottinghamshire

Career statistics
Competition	First-class
Matches	9
Runs scored	138
Batting average	9.20
100s/50s	–/–
Top score	25
Balls bowled	–
Wickets	–
Bowling average	–
5 wickets in innings	–
10 wickets in match	–
Best bowling	–
Catches/stumpings	4/–
- Source: Cricinfo, 22 February 2013

Thomas Wright (29 April 1842 – date of death unknown) was an English cricketer. Wright was a right-handed batsman who bowled right-arm roundarm slow-medium. He was born at Willington, Derbyshire.

Wright made his first-class debut for Nottinghamshire against Yorkshire in 1868 at the Dewsbury and Savile Ground. He made eight further first-class appearances for the county, the last of which came against Yorkshire in 1874. In his nine first-class matches, Wright scored a total of 138 runs at an average of 9.20, with a high score of 25.
