= Tony Siddons =

English cricketer

Personal information
- Full name: Anthony Siddons
- Born: 29 December 1941; Lenton, Nottinghamshire, England
- Died: 7 April 2005 (aged 63); Lenton, Nottinghamshire, England
- Batting: Right-handed
- Bowling: Right-arm off break

Domestic team information
- Years: Team
- 1959–1960: Nottinghamshire

Career statistics
Competition	First-class
Matches	5
Runs scored	36
Batting average	7.20
100s/50s	–/–
Top score	8
Balls bowled	581
Wickets	8
Bowling average	33.25
5 wickets in innings	–
10 wickets in match	–
Best bowling	4/37
Catches/stumpings	1/–
- Source: Cricinfo, 27 May 2012

Anthony Siddons (29 December 1941 – 6 April 2005) was an English cricketer. Siddons was a right-handed batsman who bowled right-arm off break. He was born at Lenton, Nottinghamshire.

Siddons made his first-class debut for Nottinghamshire against Somerset at the County Ground, Taunton, in the 1959 County Championship. He made four first-class appearances for the county, the last of which came against Warwickshire at the Courtaulds Ground, Coventry, the 1960 County Championship. In his five first-class appearances, he took 8 wickets at an average of 33.25, with best figures of 4/37. With the bat, he scored 36 runs at a batting average of 7.20, with a high score of 8.

He died at the place of his birth, on 2 April 2005.
