= William Harris (cricketer, born 1864) =

English cricketer

Personal information
- Full name: William Harris
- Born: 17 June 1864; Kimberley, Nottinghamshire, England
- Died: 18 June 1949 (aged 85); Crofton Park, London, England
- Batting: Right-handed
- Bowling: Right-arm off break

Domestic team information
- Years: Team
- 1886: Nottinghamshire

Career statistics
Competition	First-class
Matches	1
Runs scored	2
Batting average	2.00
100s/50s	–/–
Top score	2
Balls bowled	–
Wickets	–
Bowling average	–
5 wickets in innings	–
10 wickets in match	–
Best bowling	–
Catches/stumpings	–/–
- Source: Cricinfo, 6 October 2010

William Harris (17 June 1864 – 18 June 1949) was an English cricketer. Harris was a right-handed batsman who bowled right-arm off break. He was born in Kimberley, Nottinghamshire.

Harris played a single first-class match for Nottinghamshire against Sussex in 1886 at the County Ground, Hove. In his only first-class match he scored 2 runs in his only innings, leaving him with a batting average of 2.00.

He died at Crofton Park, London on 18 June 1949.
