= Norman Horsley =

English cricketer

Personal information
- Full name: Norman Horsley
- Born: 20 August 1922; Leicester, Leicestershire, England
- Died: 16 October 1994 (aged 72); Louth, Lincolnshire, England
- Batting: Right-handed
- Bowling: Right-arm fast

Domestic team information
- Years: Team
- 1947: Nottinghamshire

Career statistics
Competition	First-class
Matches	3
Runs scored	0
Batting average	0.00
100s/50s	–/–
Top score	0
Balls bowled	468
Wickets	6
Bowling average	41.50
5 wickets in innings	–
10 wickets in match	–
Best bowling	2/27
Catches/stumpings	1/–
- Source: Cricinfo, 3 March 2013

Norman Horsley (20 August 1922 – 16 October 1994) was an English cricketer. Horsley was a right-handed batsman who bowled right-arm fast. He was born at Leicester, Leicestershire.

Horsley made his first-class debut for Nottinghamshire against Kent in the 1947 County Championship at Trent Bridge. He made two further first-class appearances in that season's County Championship, against Yorkshire and Hampshire. Playing as a bowler, he took 6 wickets in his three first-class matches at an average of 41.50, with best figures of 2/27. He was required to bat just once in his brief first-class career, where he was dismissed for a duck against Yorkshire.

He died at Louth, Lincolnshire on 16 October 1994.
