= Albert Longdon =

English cricketer

Albert Longdon (1 November 1865 – 13 May 1937) was an English cricketer. He was a right-handed batsman and a right-arm medium-pace bowler who played for Nottinghamshire. He was born in Greasley, Nottinghamshire and died in Bentley, West Riding of Yorkshire.

Longdon made two first-class appearances within a week, during the 1895 County Championship season. Despite scoring 20 not out in his first innings, he was taken out for a duck in the second innings.
