= Archer Oates =

English cricketer

Archer Williamson Oates (9 December 1908 – 31 December 1968) was an English first-class cricketer active from 1931 until 1933 who played for Nottinghamshire.
