= Alan Wheelhouse =

English cricketer (1934–1998)

Alan Wheelhouse (4 March 1934 – 28 August 1998) was an English first-class cricketer active 1958–61 who played for Nottinghamshire. He was born in Nottingham; died in Caythorpe. In an obituary after his death, Wisden described him as "one of the most influential figures in English cricket administration".

== Bibliography ==
- Wisden (1999). Engel, Matthew (ed.). Wisden Cricketers' Almanack 1999. Wisden. p. 1490. ISBN 0-947766-51-0.
