= George Wass =

English cricketer

George Wass (6 February 1882 – 15 June 1966) was an English cricketer. He was a right-handed batsman and a right-arm medium-pace and leg-break bowler who played for Nottinghamshire. He was born in Worksop and died in Liverpool.

Wass made a single first-class appearance, during the 1910 season, against Marylebone Cricket Club. He scored a duck in the only innings in which he batted, as no play was possible on Day 2 or Day 3 of the match.

He played two games for the Second XI in the Minor Counties Championship.
