= Alexander McDougall (ship) =

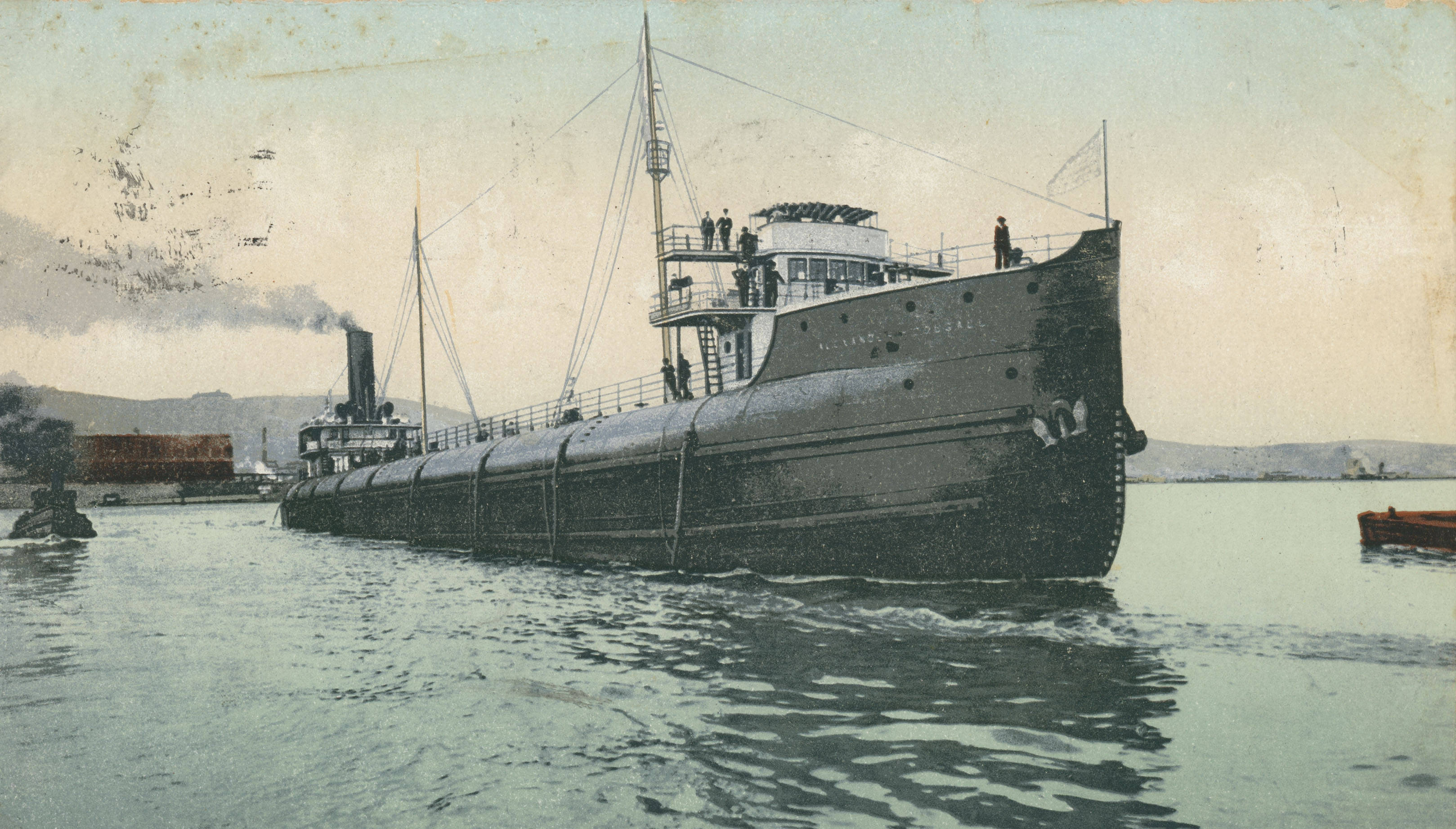

History

United States
- Name: Alexander McDougall
- Builder: American Steel Barge Company
- Launched: 25 July 1898
- Identification: U.S Registry #107372
- Fate: Unknown

General characteristics
- Class & type: Whaleback freighter
- Tonnage: 3672 gross
- Displacement: 2824 net
- Length: 418 ft (127 m)
- Beam: 50 ft (15 m)
- Draft: 22 ft (6.7 m)
- Capacity: 6,800 tons bulk cargo

SS Alexander McDougall was a "whaleback" ship, the last and longest whaleback ever built. The design, created by Scottish captain Alexander McDougall (1845–1923), enabled her to carry a maximum amount of cargo with a minimum of draft. Whalebacks were also called "pig boats", among other names, due to their appearance. The Alexander McDougall was the only whaleback built with a traditionally shaped bow. This was done in an attempt to increase the strength of the ship's hull so that the beam could be increased.

Alexander McDougall was also the only whaleback to be outfitted with a quadruple expansion engine.
