= Walter Speak =

English cricketer

Walter John Speak (20 February 1873 – 21 June 1943) was an English first-class cricketer active 1905 who played for Nottinghamshire. He was born in Ripon; died in Victoria, British Columbia.
