= Tom Birtle =

English cricketer

Personal information
- Full name: Thomas William Birtle
- Born: 28 March 1926; Norton-on-Tees, County Durham, England
- Died: 1 January 2010 (aged 83); Stockton-on-Tees, County Durham, England
- Height: 6 ft 3 in (1.91 m)
- Batting: Right-handed
- Bowling: Right-arm fast-medium

Domestic team information
- Years: Team
- 1955: Durham
- 1952: Nottinghamshire
- 1946: Durham

Career statistics
Competition	First-class
Matches	7
Runs scored	12
Batting average	2.40
100s/50s	–/–
Top score	4*
Balls bowled	1,234
Wickets	8
Bowling average	74.12
5 wickets in innings	–
10 wickets in match	–
Best bowling	2/68
Catches/stumpings	4/–
- Source: Cricinfo, 19 May 2012

Thomas William Birtle (28 March 1926 – 1 January 2010) is a former English cricketer. Birtle was a right-handed batsman who bowled right-arm fast-medium. He was born at Norton-on-Tees, County Durham, and was educated at Stockton-on-Tees Secondary School.

Birtle made his debut in county cricket for Durham against Northumberland in the 1946 Minor Counties Championship. He made a further appearance in that season for the county against the Yorkshire Second XI. He later played for Nottinghamshire, making his first-class debut against Kent in the 1952 County Championship. He made six further first-class appearances for the county, all of which came in that season, with his final appearance coming against Warwickshire. As a bowler, struggled with the ball in his seven first-class appearances for the county, taking 8 wickets at an average of 74.12, with best figures of 2/68. With the bat, he scored 12 runs at a batting average of 2.40, with a high score of 4 not out. Having left Nottinghamshire following the 1952 season, Birtle later returned to Durham, where he appeared just once more for the county, in the 1955 Minor Counties Championship against Cumberland.

Outside of cricket he worked for Imperial Chemical Industries and Pickering Lifts. He died at the University Hospital of North Tees at Stockton-on-Tees, County Durham, on 1 January 2010. He was survived by his wife and son.
