= George Royle =

English cricketer

George Murray Royle (9 January 1843 – 26 February 1910) was an English first-class cricketer active 1871–81 who played for Nottinghamshire. He was born and died in Nottingham.
