= Jarvis Carter =

British cricketer

Arthur Gervase Carter, known as Jarvis Carter (22 December 1867 – 19 July 1933) was an English first-class cricketer active 1893–95 who played for Nottinghamshire.
