= Alan Gill (cricketer) =

English cricketer (1940–2024)

Personal information
- Born: 5 August 1940 (age 86); Underwood, Nottinghamshire, England
- Died: 29 January 2024 (aged 83); Mansfield, Nottinghamshire
- Batting: Right-handed
- Bowling: Right-arm leg break
- Role: Batter

Domestic team information
- Years: Team
- 1960–1965: Nottinghamshire

Career statistics
Competition	First-class	List A
Matches	53	1
Runs scored	1,756	4
Batting average	19.29	4.00
100s/50s	0/8	0/0
Top score	67	4
Balls bowled	673	–
Wickets	10	–
Bowling average	48.20	–
5 wickets in innings	0	–
10 wickets in match	0	–
Best bowling	2/28	–
Catches/stumpings	18/–	0/–
- Source: CricketArchive, 17 October 2024

Alan Gill (5 August 1940 - 29 January 2024) was an English first-class cricketer who played for Nottinghamshire between 1960 and 1965.

Born in Underwood, Nottinghamshire, Gill was a right-handed batter often used as an opener, but although he passed 50 on eight occasions, his highest first-class score was 67.

Gill died in Mansfield, Nottinghamshire on 29 January 2024, aged 83.
