= Edward Howsin =

English cricketer (1838–1921)

Edward Arthur Howsin (26 July 1838 – 27 February 1921) was an English first-class cricketer active 1862–63 who played for Nottinghamshire. He was born in North Muskham; died in Boscombe.
