= Greg Mike (cricketer) =

English cricketer (born 1966)

Gregory Wentworth Mike (born 14 July 1966 in Nottingham) is an English former first-class cricketer active 1988–96 who played for Nottinghamshire.

His son Ben Mike is a first-class cricketer for Yorkshire.
