= William Shaw (cricketer) =

English cricketer

William Shaw (5 August 1827 – 13 February 1890) was an English first-class cricketer active 1866 who played for Nottinghamshire. He was born and died in Burton Joyce.
