= Neil Weightman =

English cricketer

Personal information
- Full name: Neil Ivan Weightman
- Born: 5 October 1960 (age 66); Normanton-on-Trent, Nottinghamshire, England
- Batting: Left-handed
- Bowling: Right-arm off break

Domestic team information
- Years: Team
- 1980–1982: Nottinghamshire

Career statistics
Competition	First-class	List A
Matches	4	8
Runs scored	175	44
Batting average	29.16	5.50
100s/50s	1/–	–/–
Top score	105	17
Balls bowled	6	–
Wickets	–	–
Bowling average	–	–
5 wickets in innings	–	–
10 wickets in match	–	–
Best bowling	–	–
Catches/stumpings	3/–	2/–
- Source: Cricinfo, 14 November 2011

Neil Ivan Weightman (born 5 October 1960) is a former English cricketer. Weightman was a left-handed batsman who bowled right-arm off break. He was born at Normanton-on-Trent, Nottinghamshire.

Weightman made his debut for Nottinghamshire in a List A match against Hampshire in the 1980 John Player League. He made seven further List A appearances, the last of which came against Derbyshire in the 1981 NatWest Trophy. In his eight List A appearances, he scored just 44 runs at an average of 5.50, with a high score of 17. He made his first-class debut for the county against Lancashire in the 1981 County Championship. He made two further first-class appearances in 1981, against Leicestershire and Surrey, while in 1982 he made a single appearance against Cambridge University. In his four first-class matches, he scored a total of 175 runs at an average of 29.16, with a high score of 105. This score was the only time he passed fifty and came against Leicestershire.
