= Ben McGuire =

English cricketer (born 1991)

Personal information
- Full name: Ben Thomas McGuire
- Born: 31 December 1991 (age 34); Ashington, Northumberland, England
- Batting: Left-handed
- Bowling: Right-arm medium

Domestic team information
- Years: Team
- 2009–present: Staffordshire
- 2009: Nottinghamshire

Career statistics
Competition	List A
Matches	1
Runs scored	0
Batting average	0.00
100s/50s	–/–
Top score	0
Balls bowled	–
Wickets	–
Bowling average	–
5 wickets in innings	–
10 wickets in match	–
Best bowling	–
Catches/stumpings	–/–
- Source: Cricinfo, 18 June 2011

Ben Thomas McGuire (born 31 December 1991) is an English cricketer. McGuire is a left-handed batsman who bowls right-arm medium pace. He was born in Ashington, Northumberland.

Having played for the Nottinghamshire Second XI since 2008, McGuire made his only appearance for Nottinghamshire in a List A match against Gloucestershire in the 2009 NatWest Pro40. In this match, he was dismissed for David Payne. It was in 2009 that McGuire made his debut for Staffordshire in Minor counties cricket, against Suffolk in the MCCA Knockout Trophy. McGuire still plays for Staffordshire, making to date 8 Minor Counties Championship and 12 MCCA Knockout Trophy matches. Having stopped playing for the Nottinghamshire Second XI in 2009, McGuire has represented the Worcestershire Second XI in 2011.
