= Robert Tolley =

English cricketer (1849–1901)

Robert Tolley (14 March 1849 – 2 January 1901) was an English first-class cricketer active 1871–78 who played for Nottinghamshire. He was born in Radford, Nottinghamshire; died in Nottingham.
