= Lionel Kirk =

English cricketer

Lionel Kirk (1 November 1884 – 27 February 1953) was an English first-class cricketer active 1920–29 who played for Nottinghamshire. He was born in Sheffield; died in Nottingham.
