= Paul Taylor (cricketer, born 1939) =

English cricketer

Personal information
- Full name: Paul Adrian Taylor
- Born: 9 March 1939 (age 87); Kirkby-in-Ashfield, Nottinghamshire, England
- Batting: Left-handed
- Bowling: Left-arm fast-medium

Domestic team information
- Years: Team
- 1958: Nottinghamshire

Career statistics
Competition	First-class
Matches	6
Runs scored	34
Batting average	6.80
100s/50s	–/–
Top score	13
Balls bowled	608
Wickets	7
Bowling average	47.85
5 wickets in innings	–
10 wickets in match	–
Best bowling	2/82
Catches/stumpings	5/–
- Source: Cricinfo, 19 May 2012

Paul Adrian Taylor (born 9 March 1939) is a former English cricketer. Taylor was a left-handed batsman who bowled left-arm fast-medium. He was born at Kirkby-in-Ashfield, Nottinghamshire.

Taylor made his first-class debut for Nottinghamshire against Middlesex in the 1958 County Championship. He made five further first-class appearances for the county, all of which came in that season, with his final appearance coming against Surrey. In his six first-class appearances for the county, he took 7 wickets at an average of 47.85, with best figures of 2/82. With the bat, he scored 34 runs at a batting average of 6.80, with a high score of 13.
