= William Riley (Nottinghamshire cricketer) =

English cricketer

William Riley (11 August 1888 – 9 August 1917) was an English cricketer active from 1909 to 1914 who played for Nottinghamshire. He was born in Newstead, Nottinghamshire and died in military action near Koksijde (Coxyde), Belgium, during the First World War. He appeared in 80 first-class matches as a lefthanded batsman who bowled left arm slow medium. He scored 740 runs with a highest score of 48 and took 235 wickets with a best performance of seven for 80. He was killed in the First World War while serving as a gunner with the 133rd Siege Battery, Royal Garrison Artillery.
