= George Gauld (cricketer) =

Scottish doctor and cricketer

George Ogg Gauld (21 June 1873 – 16 June 1950 (aged 76)) was a Scottish medical doctor and cricketer who played first-class cricket for Nottinghamshire in 1913 and 1914.

== Life and career ==
George Gauld was born in Rubislaw, Aberdeen, and educated at Aberdeen Grammar School and The University of Aberdeen, where he studied medicine. He did not make his first-class cricket debut until a few days after his 40th birthday, when he was asked to replace Arthur Jones, who was ill, as the county's captain. He played 13 matches for Nottinghamshire, captaining the team in all of them.

Batting in the lower middle order and occasionally bowling fast-medium, Gauld's highest score was 90 against Derbyshire in 1914. Going to the wicket with the score at 145 for 6, he added 115 with Wilfred Payton in only 65 minutes before he was out. Nottinghamshire won.

He was honorary secretary of Nottinghamshire from 1922 to 1935. He served as President of the Nottingham Medico-Chirurgical Society in 1933-34.
