= David Fraser-Darling =

English cricketer (born 1963)

Personal information
- Full name: Callum David Fraser-Darling
- Born: 30 September 1963 (age 63); Sheffield, Yorkshire, England
- Batting: Right-handed
- Bowling: Right-arm medium-fast

Domestic team information
- Years: Team
- 1984–1988: Nottinghamshire

Career statistics
Competition	First-class	List A
Matches	11	16
Runs scored	242	60
Batting average	24.20	8.57
100s/50s	–/1	–/–
Top score	61	11
Balls bowled	1,356	528
Wickets	17	18
Bowling average	51.52	26.38
5 wickets in innings	1	–
10 wickets in match	–	–
Best bowling	5/84	3/23
Catches/stumpings	11/–	3/–
- Source: Cricinfo, 14 November 2011

Callum David Fraser-Darling (born 30 September 1963) is a former English cricketer. Fraser-Darling was a right-handed batsman who bowled right-arm medium-fast. He was born at Sheffield, Yorkshire.

== Early life ==
He was the son of the doctor, Alisdair Fraser-Darling, from St Vincent's House in Caythorpe, Lincolnshire. A sister was born on 25 September 1957. He attended Edinburgh Academy. He played cricket and rugby for the Scottish schools teams.

== Sporting career ==
Fraser-Darling made his first-class debut for Nottinghamshire against Cambridge University in 1984. He made ten further first-class appearances for the county, the last of which came against Oxford University in 1988. In his eleven first-class matches, he scored 242 runs at an average of 24.20, with a high score of 61. This score was the only time he passed fifty and came against Northamptonshire in 1986. With the ball, he took 17 wickets at a bowling average of 51.52, with best figures of 5/84. These figures were his only five wicket haul and came against Northamptonshire in 1986. He made his List A debut against Middlesex in the 1985 John Player Special League. He made fifteen further List A appearances, the last of which came against Surrey in the 1988 Refuge Assurance League. In his sixteen List A appearances, took 18 wickets at an average of 26.38, with best figures of 3/23. With the bat, he scored just 60 runs at an average of 8.57, with a high score of 11.

== Career ==
He left Nottinghamshire at the end of the 1988 season, soon after he pursued a career as a police officer. He still serves today as a police constable with Nottinghamshire Constabulary. Since 1989 he has represented the British Police cricket team.
