= Richard Housley =

English cricketer

Personal information
- Full name: Richard Housley
- Born: 8 May 1849; Mansfield Woodhouse, Nottinghamshire, England
- Died: 23 April 1881 (aged 31); Mansfield Woodhouse, Nottinghamshire, England
- Batting: Right-handed

Domestic team information
- Years: Team
- 1870: Nottinghamshire

Career statistics
Competition	First-class
Matches	1
Runs scored	3
Batting average	1.50
100s/50s	–/–
Top score	2
Balls bowled	–
Wickets	–
Bowling average	–
5 wickets in innings	–
10 wickets in match	–
Best bowling	–
Catches/stumpings	–/–
- Source: Cricinfo, 27 May 2012

Richard Housley (8 May 1849 – 23 April 1881) was an English cricketer. Housley was a right-handed batsman. He was born at Mansfield Woodhouse, Nottinghamshire.

Housley made a single first-class appearance for Nottinghamshire against Yorkshire at Trent Bridge in 1870. Yorkshire won the toss and elected to bat first, making 108 all out. In response, Nottinghamshire made just 56 all out, with Housley being dismissed by George Freeman for 2 runs. In their second-innings, Yorkshire were dismissed for 122, leaving Nottinghamshire with a target of 175 for victory. Nottinghamshire fell narrowly short of reaching that target, being dismissed for 172 to lose by 2 runs. During their chase, Housley was run out for a single run. This was his only major appearance for the county.

He later stood as an umpire in two first-class matches at Bramall Lane in 1877, with Yorkshire playing Derbyshire and Nottinghamshire. He died at the village of his birth on 23 April 1881.
