= William Clarke (cricketer, born 1849) =

English cricketer

William Clarke (17 March 1849 – 29 May 1935) was an English first-class cricketer active 1876–77 who played for Nottinghamshire. He was born in Kirkby-in-Ashfield; died in Mapperley.
