= William Jackson (cricketer) =

English cricketer

William Jackson (born 5 August 1820 in Basford, Nottinghamshire; details of death unknown) was an English first-class cricketer active 1844–48 who played for Nottinghamshire.
