= James Stapleton =

English cricketer (1879–1944)

James Stapleton (8 August 1879 – 10 July 1944) was an English first-class cricketer active 1899–1911 who played for Nottinghamshire as a wicketkeeper. He was born in Eastwood, Nottinghamshire; died in Brinsley.
