= Thomas Morley (cricketer) =

English cricketer (1863–1919)

Thomas Morley (10 March 1863 – 28 October 1919) was an English first-class cricketer active 1887 who played for Nottinghamshire. He was born in Sutton-in-Ashfield; died in Norwich.
