= Noel Turner (cricketer) =

English cricketer

Noel Vernon Cyril Turner (12 May 1887 – 13 June 1941) was an English first-class cricketer, active 1906–12, who played for Nottinghamshire as a right-handed middle order batsman. He was born in Langley Mill, and died in Hungerford. His father was Tom Newsum Turner, son of George Reynolds Turner. His younger brother Robert Harrison Tom Turner also played first-class cricket for Nottinghamshire.

Turner also played football, as a goalkeeper for Corinthian, and in 1920 played in an amateur international match for England against Belgium. He became honorary secretary for the Arthur Dunn Challenge Cup in 1920, and was elected president in 1928. He was public school representative on the FA Council from 1924 to 1928.
