= Edward Marshall =

Edward Marshall may refer to:

- Edward Marshall (sculptor) (1598–1675) 17th century English sculptor and Master Mason to King Charles II
- Edward C. Marshall (1821–1893), U.S. Representative from California
- Edward Carrington Marshall (1805–1882), Virginia farmer, planter, businessman, and politician.
- Edward Marshall (rower) (1908–1984), American rower
- Doc Marshall (infielder) (Edward Harbert Marshall, 1906–1999), infielder in Major League Baseball

== See also ==
- Ted Marshall, British art director
