= George Summers (cricketer) =

English cricketer (1844–1870)

Personal information
- Full name: George Summers
- Born: 21 June 1844; Nottingham, England
- Died: 19 June 1870 (aged 25); Nottingham, England
- Batting: Right-handed
- Role: Batsman

Domestic team information
- Years: Team
- 1867–1870: Nottinghamshire

Career statistics
Competition	First-class
Matches	32
Runs scored	922
Batting average	15.89
100s/50s	–/1
Top score	57
Catches/stumpings	15/–
- Source: , 11 June 2012

George Summers (21 June 1844 – 19 June 1870) was an English cricketer. He played all his first-class cricket for Nottinghamshire.

Summers was the son of a Nottingham hotelier.

In the match against MCC at Lord's in 1870, Summers was hit by a short delivery from John Platts, at the time a fast bowler. He was carried off the field. He seemed to recover, and was not taken to hospital, but went by train back to Nottingham. He died from his injury four days later. Lord's at the time was renowned for being a poor pitch. After Summers' death, efforts were made to improve it, and the MCC paid for his gravestone. The death of Summers ensured that the lethal bowler, Platts, never bowled fast again.

As a protest against what he saw as dangerous bowling, the next batsman—Richard Daft—came out to the wicket with his head wrapped in a towel.

== See also ==
- List of unusual deaths in the 19th century
- Ray Chapman, an American baseball player killed after being struck by a ball during a game; he was the only player in Major League Baseball history to die of an in-game injury
- List of fatal accidents in cricket
