= Arthur Ashwell (cricketer, born 1853) =

English cricketer

Arthur Thomas Ashwell (8 February 1853 – 30 September 1925) was an English cricketer who played for Nottinghamshire. He was a right-handed batsman. He was born in Nottingham and died in Canterbury, Kent.

Ashwell made just two first-class appearances for Nottinghamshire during the 1876 season, and in the two innings in which he batted, he failed to score a run.

Ashwell's brother, Charles, made one first-class appearance in 1876.
