= William Henson (cricketer) =

English cricketer

William Walker Henson (7 December 1872 – 7 September 1922) was an English first-class cricketer active 1897–98 who played for Nottinghamshire. He was born in Lenton, Nottinghamshire; died in Dumfries.
