= Edward Blagg =

English cricketer

Edward Blagg (9 February 1918 – 28 October 1976) was an English cricketer. He was a right-handed batsman and right-arm medium-fast bowler who played for Nottinghamshire. He was born and died in Shireoaks.

Blagg made a single first-class appearance for the side, during the 1948 season, against Leicestershire. From the tailend, Blagg did not bat in the match, but bowled four overs, conceding 20 runs.

Blagg made four Second XI appearances during the same season.
