= Arthur Bennett (English cricketer) =

English cricketer

Arthur Robert Bennett (16 November 1868 – 7 May 1899) was an English first-class cricketer active 1893–96 who played for Nottinghamshire. He was born in Nottingham and died in Marylebone. He was born in Mapperley, the son of Charles Bennett, a brickmaker.
