= Benjamin Gregory (cricketer) =

English cricketer

Benjamin Gregory (1863–1951) was an English cricketer active from 1895 to 1902 who played for Nottinghamshire. Gregory appeared in five first-class matches, bowled right-arm medium pace. He was born in Eastwood, Nottinghamshire, England on 6 October 1863 and died Kilton, Worksop, Nottinghamshire, England on 27 January 1951. Gregory scored nine runs, once he reached the four score, and took 9 wickets.
