= John Parkin (cricketer) =

English cricketer (born 1944)

John Maurice Parkin (born 16 October 1944 in Kimberley, Nottinghamshire) is a former English first-class cricketer who played for Nottinghamshire between 1966 and 1968.

While playing for Nottinghamshire, Parkin was part of a notable occurrence when he was the non-striker when Gary Sobers hit six sixes in an over in a County match against Glasmorgan.
