= Frederick Wyld =

English cricketer

Frederick Wyld (28 August 1847 – 11 February 1893) was an English first-class cricketer active from 1868 to 1885 who played for Nottinghamshire. He was born at Eastwood, Nottinghamshire and died at Nottingham. He appeared in 180 first-class matches as a right-handed batsman and wicket-keeper who occasionally bowled right arm roundarm fast. He scored 3,967 runs with a highest score of 104 not out, one of two centuries in his career. He held 185 catches and completed 53 stumpings. He took 8 wickets with a best performance of four for 33.
