= Joseph Knowles (cricketer) =

English cricketer

Joseph Knowles (25 March 1910 – 13 September 1993) was an English first-class cricketer active 1935–46 who played for Nottinghamshire. He was born and died in Nottingham.
