= Robert Winrow =

Scottish cricketer

Robert Winrow (30 December 1910 – 10 August 1999) was a Scottish first-class cricketer active 1932–49 who played for Scotland and Nottinghamshire. He was born in Manton, Nottinghamshire; died in Rothesay, Bute.
