= Edwin Marshall (cricketer) =

English cricketer

Edwin Alfred Marshall (21 August 1904 – 28 January 1970) was an English first-class cricketer active 1935–38 who played for Nottinghamshire. He was born and died in Nottingham.
