= John Kesteven =

English cricketer

Personal information
- Full name: John Kesteven
- Born: 8 July 1849; Sutton-in-Ashfield, Nottinghamshire, England
- Batting: Right-handed
- Bowling: Right-arm roundarm medium

Domestic team information
- Years: Team
- 1876: Nottinghamshire

Career statistics
Competition	First-class
Matches	3
Runs scored	24
Batting average	6.00
100s/50s	–/–
Top score	12
Balls bowled	–
Wickets	–
Bowling average	–
5 wickets in innings	–
10 wickets in match	–
Best bowling	–
Catches/stumpings	1/–
- Source: Cricinfo, 19 May 2012

John Kesteven (8 July 1849 – date of death unknown) was an English cricketer. Kesteven was a right-handed batsman who bowled right-arm roundarm medium pace. He was born at Sutton-in-Ashfield, Nottinghamshire.

Kesteven made three first-class appearances for Nottinghamshire in 1876, Yorkshire at Trent Bridge, Middlesex at Prince's Cricket Ground, Chelsea, and Lancashire at Old Trafford. In his three first-class appearances, he scored a total of 24 runs at an average of 6.00, with a high score of 12.

He later became the secretary of the Sutton-in-Ashfield Professional Cricketers' Society.
