= John Truswell =

English cricketer

John Richard Truswell (14 January 1841 – 6 August 1892) was an English cricketer.

Truswell was born at Farnsfield in Nottinghamshire in 1841. He is known to have played village cricket from 1859 and donated a sovereign to help pay for the establishment of a new ground in the village in 1862. He played in two first-class cricket matches for Nottinghamshire County Cricket Club in 1868 and is known to have played other matches for the Gentlemen of Nottinghamshire and the All England Eleven until 1871.

Truswell was a farmer. He died of dropsy at Farnsfield in 1892 aged 51.
