= Henry Flear =

English cricketer

Personal information
- Full name: Henry Flear
- Born: 21 January 1818; Nottingham, Nottinghamshire, England
- Died: 16 April 1852 (aged 34); Nottingham, Nottinghamshire, England
- Batting: Unknown

Domestic team information
- Years: Team
- 1843: Nottinghamshire

Career statistics
Competition	First-class
Matches	1
Runs scored	9
Batting average	–
100s/50s	–/–
Top score	9*
Balls bowled	–
Wickets	–
Bowling average	–
5 wickets in innings	–
10 wickets in match	–
Best bowling	–
Catches/stumpings	–/–
- Source: Cricinfo, 18 May 2012

Henry Flear (21 January 1818 – 16 April 1852) was an English cricketer. Flear's batting style is unknown. He was born at Nottingham, Nottinghamshire.

Flear made a single first-class appearance for Nottinghamshire against Sussex at Trent Bridge in 1843. Batting first, Nottinghamshire made 326 all out, with Flear ending the innings not out on 9. In response, Sussex were dismissed for just 33, and were forced to follow-on, making an improved 262 all out. Despite this Sussex still lost the match, with Nottinghamshire winning by an innings and 31 runs. This was his only major appearance for the county.

He died at the town of his birth on 16 April 1852.
