= William Marriott (cricketer) =

English cricketer

William Marriott (6 January 1850 – 28 August 1887) was an English first-class cricketer active 1880–81 who played for Nottinghamshire. He was born in Hucknall-under-Huthwaite and died in Huyton of typhoid fever.
