= Alfred Fewkes =

English cricketer

Alfred Fewkes (31 August 1837 — 1 April 1912) was an English cricketer. He was a wicket-keeper who played for Nottinghamshire. He was born in Basford, Nottingham and died in Sherwood Rise.

Fewkes, who also played in All England Eleven matches for Harrogate, Arnold, Nottingham Commercial Club, Wirksworth and Radcliffe-on-Trent, made a single first-class appearance, during the 1864 season, against Cambridgeshire.

From the tailend, Fewkes scored 9 runs in the first innings in which he batted, and 2 runs in the second. He took two catches and two stumpings.
