= Walter Yates (cricketer) =

English cricketer

Personal information
- Full name: Walter Gerald Yates
- Born: 18 June 1919; Warsop, Nottinghamshire, England
- Died: 15 December 2008 (aged 89); Nottinghamshire, England
- Batting: Right-handed
- Bowling: Right-arm medium

Domestic team information
- Years: Team
- 1937–1938: Nottinghamshire

Career statistics
Competition	First-class
Matches	6
Runs scored	69
Batting average	9.85
100s/50s	–/–
Top score	19
Balls bowled	90
Wickets	1
Bowling average	54.00
5 wickets in innings	–
10 wickets in match	–
Best bowling	1/43
Catches/stumpings	1/–
- Source: Cricinfo, 31 October 2011

Walter Gerald Yates (18 June 1919 – 15 December 2008) was an English cricketer. Yates was a right-handed batsman who bowled right-arm medium pace. He was born at Warsop, Nottinghamshire.

Yates made his first-class debut for Nottinghamshire against Leicestershire in 1937 County Championship. He made five further first-class appearances for the county, the last of which came against Kent in the 1938 County Championship. In his six first-class appearances, he scored 69 runs at an average of 9.85, with a high score of 19. He took a single first-class wicket, that of Essex captain Denys Wilcox.

Yates served during World War II with the Royal Air Force Volunteer Reserve, serving by November 1942 with the rank of corporal. By April 1943, Yates held the rank of pilot officer. It was in May that he was dismissed from service by way of a General Court-martial. However, as the war effort was short of pilots, he was demoted and served as a Spitfire pilot in Burma with the County of Durham Squadron until the end of the war.

He died in Nottinghamshire on 15 December 2008.
