= George Power (cricketer) =

English cricketer

Personal information
- Full name: George Edward Power
- Born: 16 May 1849; Witchford, Cambridgeshire, England
- Died: 29 October 1904 (aged 55); Hucknall, Nottinghamshire, England
- Batting: Right-handed

Domestic team information
- Years: Team
- 1876: Nottinghamshire

Career statistics
Competition	First-class
Matches	1
Runs scored	3
Batting average	3.00
100s/50s	–/–
Top score	3
Balls bowled	–
Wickets	–
Bowling average	–
5 wickets in innings	–
10 wickets in match	–
Best bowling	–
Catches/stumpings	1/–
- Source: Cricinfo, 22 February 2013

George Edward Power (16 May 1849 – 29 October 1904) was an English cricketer. Power was a right-handed batsman. He was born at Witchford, Cambridgeshire.

Power made a single first-class appearance for Nottinghamshire against Surrey at Trent Bridge in 1876. In what was an innings and 24 runs victory for Nottinghamshire, Power batted once and scored 3 runs, before being dismissed by James Southerton. This was his only major appearance for Nottinghamshire.

He died at Hucknall, Nottinghamshire on 29 October 1904.
