= Percy Oscroft =

English cricketer

Percy William Oscroft (27 November 1872 – 8 December 1933) was an English first-class cricketer active 1894–1900 who played for Nottinghamshire. He was born in Nottingham; died in St John's Wood.
