= Alexander MacDougall (cricketer) =

English cricketer

Personal information
- Full name: Alexander William MacDougall
- Born: 19 March 1837; Kingston, Surrey County, Jamaica
- Died: 1 November 1917 (aged 80); Greenwich, London, England
- Batting: Unknown

Domestic team information
- Years: Team
- 1858: Nottinghamshire

Career statistics
Competition	First-class
Matches	1
Runs scored	3
Batting average	1.50
100s/50s	–/–
Top score	3
Balls bowled	–
Wickets	–
Bowling average	–
5 wickets in innings	–
10 wickets in match	–
Best bowling	–
Catches/stumpings	–/–
- Source: Cricinfo, 18 February 2013

Alexander William MacDougall (19 March 1837 – 1 November 1917) was an English first-class cricketer. MacDougall's batting style is unknown. He was born at Kingston, Jamaica.

MacDougall made a single first-class appearance for Nottinghamshire against Surrey in 1858 at The Oval. He was dismissed for three runs in Nottinghamshire's first-innings by William Caffyn, while in their second-innings he was dismissed for a duck by Frederick Miller, with Surrey winning the match by ninw wickets. This was his only major appearance for Nottinghamshire.

According to the 1871 and 1881 Census, he lived at Battlefields House, Bath.

He died at Greenwich, London on 1 November 1917.
