= Noel Gie =

South African cricketer (born 1977)

Personal information
- Full name: Noel Addison Gie
- Born: April 12, 1977 (age 49); South Africa
- Batting: Right-handed
- Bowling: Right-arm medium-pace
- Role: Batsman
- Relatives: Clive Gie (father)

Domestic team information
- Years: Team
- 1995–1999: Nottinghamshire

Noel Addison Gie (born 12 April 1977) is a South African cricketer. A right-handed batsman and right-arm medium-pace bowler, Gie's father, Clive, played for Western Province, Northern Transvaal and Natal. Gie himself made his first class cricket debut for Nottinghamshire in 1995 and played sixteen matches, scoring 455 runs at a batting average of 18.95. He scored three half-centuries, the best of which was 58 not out. He also played 22 List-A matches for the county, scoring 421 runs at 23.38 and three further half-centuries the best of which was 75*.

Gie also scored a century for the England Under-19 team. He retired from first-class cricket in 1999.

Since retiring from cricket, Gie went on to co-found Corporate Software Services. He is currently the president and CEO and based in Costa Mesa, California.
