= Charles Clifton (cricketer) =

English cricketer

Personal information
- Full name: Charles Clifton
- Born: 13 January 1846; Ruddington, Nottinghamshire, England
- Died: Unknown
- Batting: Right-handed
- Bowling: Right-arm roundarm fast
- Relatives: James Grundy (father-in-law); John Grundy (brother-in-law)

Domestic team information
- Years: Team
- 1873–1876: Nottinghamshire

Umpiring information
- FC umpired: 2 (1885–1887)

Career statistics
Competition	First-class
Matches	10
Runs scored	168
Batting average	10.50
100s/50s	–/–
Top score	45
Balls bowled	96
Wickets	–
Bowling average	–
5 wickets in innings	–
10 wickets in match	–
Best bowling	–
Catches/stumpings	9/–
- Source: Cricinfo, 22 February 2013

Charles Clifton (13 January 1846 – date of death unknown) was an English cricketer. Clifton was a right-handed batsman who bowled right-arm roundarm fast. He was born at Ruddington, Nottinghamshire.

Clifton made his first-class debut for Nottinghamshire against Surrey in 1873 at The Oval, with him making a further first-class appearance that season against Sussex at the County Ground, Hove. Six first-class appearances for the county followed in 1874, while in 1875 he made a first-class appearance for the North in the North v South fixture. It was in 1875 that he also made a final first-class appearance for Nottinghamshire against the Marylebone Cricket Club at Lord's. Clifton made eight first-class appearances for the county, scoring a total of 163 runs at an average of 11.64, with a high score of 45.

He later stood as an umpire in two first-class matches, one between Cambridge University and Yorkshire in 1885, and another in 1887 between Cambridge University and the Marylebone Cricket Club. His father-in-law James Grundy and brother-in-law John Grundy both played first-class cricket.
