= William Underwood (cricketer) =

English cricketer

William Underwood (26 February 1852 – 9 May 1914) was an English first-class cricketer active 1874–1895, and played for Nottinghamshire.

He was born in Ruddington, Nottinghamshire; died in Bradmore, Nottinghamshire. He died of a self-inflicted gunshot wound at his home in 1914.
