= Robert Turner (Nottinghamshire cricketer) =

English cricketer (1888–1947)

Robert Harrison Tom Turner (26 October 1888 – 13 September 1947) was an English first-class cricketer active 1906–27 who played for Nottinghamshire. He was born in Langley Mill; died in Shipley, Derbyshire.
