= Wilfred Payton (priest) =

English cricketer and clergyman

Personal information
- Full name: Wilfred Ernest Granville Payton
- Born: 27 December 1913; Beeston, Nottinghamshire, England
- Died: 4 September 1989 (aged 75); Nailsworth, Gloucestershire, England
- Batting: Right-handed

Domestic team information
- Years: Team
- 1935: Nottinghamshire
- 1937: Cambridge University
- 1949: Derbyshire
- FC debut: 22 May 1935 Notts v Cambridge Univ.
- Last FC: 3 June 1953 Combined Services v Gloucestershire

Career statistics
Competition	First-class
Matches	27
Runs scored	995
Batting average	20.72
100s/50s	0/2
Top score	98
Catches/stumpings	11/–
- Source: Cricket Archive, January 2012

The Venerable Wilfred Ernest Granville Payton CB (27 December 1913 – 4 September 1989) was an English clergyman and cricketer who played first-class cricket for Nottinghamshire in 1935, Cambridge University in 1937 and Derbyshire in 1949.

Payton was born at Beeston, Nottinghamshire, the son of Wilfred Payton who also played for Nottinghamshire. He was educated at Nottingham High School and Emmanuel College, Cambridge. He made his debut for Nottinghamshire against Cambridge University in May 1935 when he made double figure scores. In 1937 he played for Cambridge following a top score of 74 in the Seniors' match. He opened with Paul Gibb, but he won his Blue as much for his keenness in the field as for his dogged batting. His contributions at the varsity match were 10 and 3.

On 1 January 1941 Payton was commissioned into the Royal Air Force as a chaplain. After World War II service with the Royal Air Force Volunteer Reserve, Payton played thirteen first-class games for the Combined Services, and in 1948 he was bowled when 2 runs short of a century in a convincing win over Glamorgan in their Championship year. Payton played two matches for Derbyshire in the 1949 season.

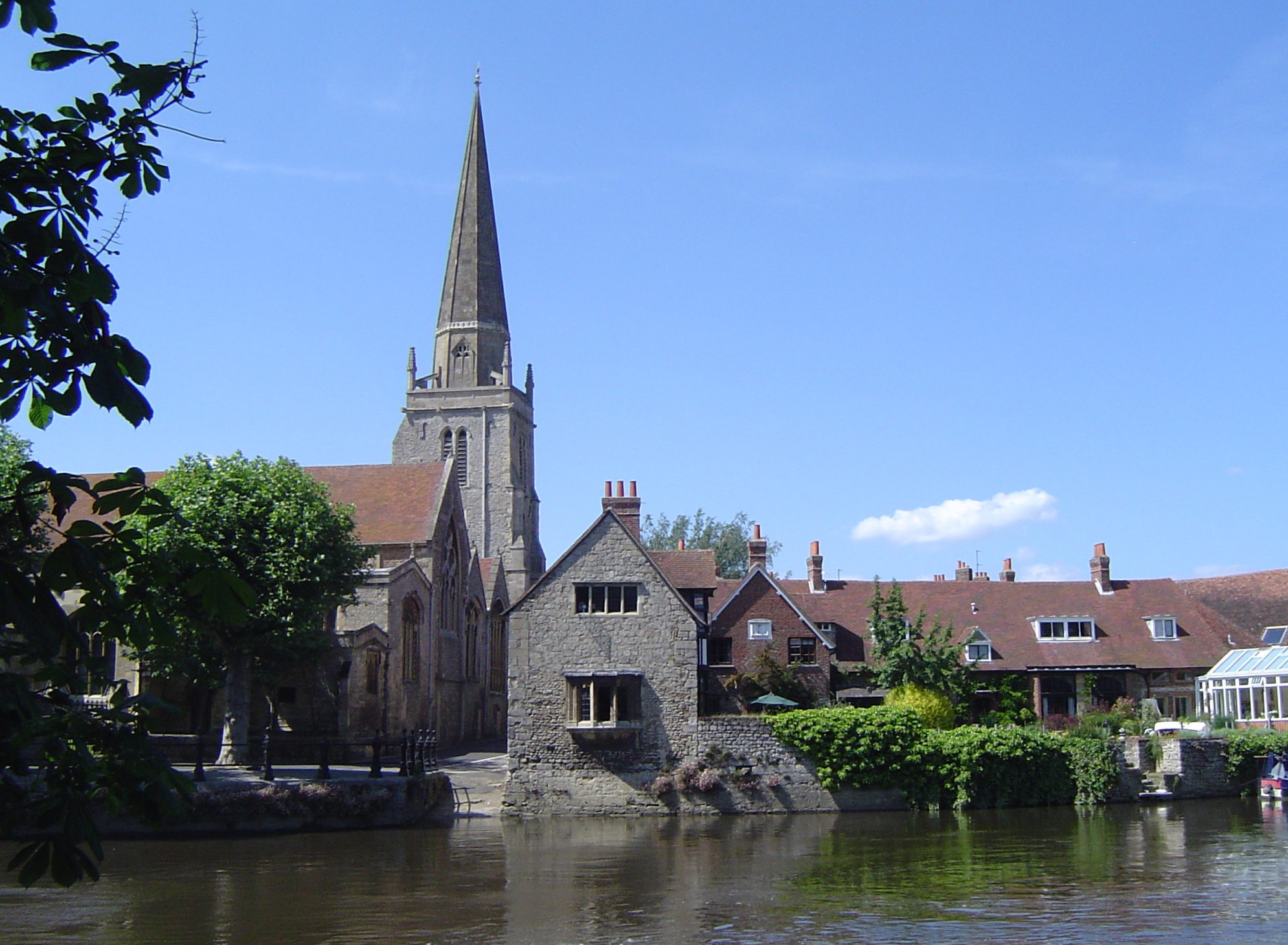
St Helen's Church, Abingdon from across the river

Payton was a right-hand batsman who played 52 innings in 27 first-class matches with an average of 20.72 and a top score of 98.

Payton was Chaplain-in-Chief to the RAF and became honorary chaplain to The Queen in 1965. He retired from the RAF in 1969 and became Vicar and Rural Dean of Abingdon.

Payton died at Ladder Hill, Nailsworth, Gloucestershire at the age of 75.

Church of England titles
Preceded by Francis William Cocks	Chaplain-in-Chief of the RAF; 1965–1969	Succeeded by Leonard James Ashton
