= Joe Walters (cricketer) =

English cricketer (1940–2021)

Personal information
- Full name: Joseph Arthur Walters
- Born: 12 February 1940; Bolsover, Derbyshire, England
- Died: 16 May 2021 (aged 81); Worksop, Nottinghamshire, England
- Batting: Right-handed
- Bowling: Right-arm leg-spin

Domestic team information
- Years: Team
- 1958–1959: Nottinghamshire

Career statistics
Competition	First-class
Matches	5
Runs scored	64
Batting average	64.00
100s/50s	0/0
Top score	21*
Balls bowled	712
Wickets	10
Bowling average	46.40
5 wickets in innings	1
10 wickets in match	0
Best bowling	6/139
Catches/stumpings	4/–
- Source: Cricinfo, 17 November 2021

Joseph Arthur Walters (12 February 1940 – 16 May 2021) was an English first-class cricketer who played five matches for Nottinghamshire in 1958 and 1959.

Walters was signed by Nottinghamshire in 1954 at the age of 14. A leg-spinner, he took 6 for 139 off 36.3 overs against Oxford University in May 1959. It was the only match in which he was dismissed: in his nine innings he was not out eight times, and by a statistical quirk his final batting average of 64 was more than three times his highest score.

Walters' professional cricket career was ended by an injury he suffered in a fall at work. He played his last match at 19 years of age. He died in May 2021, two months after he and his wife Marian had celebrated their diamond wedding anniversary.
