= Benjamin Blackburn (cricketer) =

English cricketer

Personal information
- Full name: Benjamin Fielding Blackburn
- Born: 10 September 1855; Meadows, Nottinghamshire, England
- Died: 6 May 1907 (aged 51); Bournemouth, Hampshire, England
- Batting: Right-handed

Domestic team information
- Years: Team
- 1879: Nottinghamshire

Career statistics
Competition	First-class
Matches	2
Runs scored	6
Batting average	3.00
100s/50s	–/–
Top score	4*
Balls bowled	–
Wickets	–
Bowling average	–
5 wickets in innings	–
10 wickets in match	–
Best bowling	–
Catches/stumpings	2/–
- Source: Cricinfo, 19 May 2012

Benjamin Fielding Blackburn (10 September 1855 – 6 May 1907) was an English cricketer. Blackburn was a right-handed batsman. He was born at Meadows, Nottinghamshire.

Blackburn made two first-class appearances for Nottinghamshire in 1879, against Lancashire at Old Trafford, and Kent at Trent Bridge. Nottinghamshire won the toss against Lancashire and elected to bat, making 162 all out in their first-innings, with Blackburn being dismissed for 2 runs by William McIntyre. Lancashire responded by making 184 all out in their first-innings, with Nottinghamshire then making 174/8 in their second-innings, with Blackburn ending the innings not out on 4. The match ended as a draw. In his second match against Kent, Nottinghamshire won the toss and elected to bat, making 253, with Blackburn being dismissed for a duck by George Hearne. In response, Kent were dismissed for 109, and were forced to follow-on, making 100 all out, giving Nottinghamshire victory by an innings and 31 runs.

He died at Bournemouth, Hampshire, on 6 May 1907.
