= Arthur Bates (cricketer) =

English cricketer

Personal information
- Full name: Arthur John Bates
- Born: 18 June 1852; Nottingham, Nottinghamshire, England
- Died: 13 February 1925 (aged 72); Lenton, Nottinghamshire, England
- Batting: Right-handed
- Bowling: Right-arm slow

Domestic team information
- Years: Team
- 1878: Nottinghamshire

Career statistics
Competition	First-class
Matches	2
Runs scored	5
Batting average	1.25
100s/50s	–/–
Top score	5
Balls bowled	–
Wickets	–
Bowling average	–
5 wickets in innings	–
10 wickets in match	–
Best bowling	–
Catches/stumpings	–/–
- Source: Cricinfo, 22 February 2013

Arthur John Bates (18 June 1852 – 13 February 1925) was an English cricketer. Bates was a right-handed batsman who bowled right-arm slow. He was born at Nottingham, Nottinghamshire.

Bates made two first-class appearances for Nottinghamshire in 1878, against Derbyshire at Trent Bridge and Yorkshire at Bramall Lane, scoring just 5 runs in his two matches.

He died at Lenton, Nottinghamshire on 13 February 1925.
