= David Pullan =

English cricketer (1944–2022)

Personal information
- Full name: David Anthony Pullan
- Born: 1 May 1944; Farsley, Leeds, Yorkshire, England
- Died: 6 October 2022 (aged 78)
- Batting: Right-handed
- Role: Wicket-keeper

Domestic team information
- Years: Team
- 1970–1974: Nottinghamshire

Career statistics
Competition	FC	List A
Matches	95	49
Runs scored	613	38
Batting average	8.75	3.16
100s/50s	0/0	0/0
Top score	34	18*
Catches/stumpings	207/27	43/2
- Source: Cricinfo, 9 October 2022

David Anthony Pullan (1 May 1944 – 6 October 2022) was an English first-class cricketer who played for Nottinghamshire as a wicket-keeper from 1970 to 1974.
