= Harry Winrow =

English cricketer

Frederick Henry Winrow (17 January 1916 – 19 August 1973) was an English cricketer active from 1938 to 1951 who played for Nottinghamshire. He was born in Manton, Nottinghamshire and died in East London, South Africa. He appeared in 113 first-class matches as a lefthanded batsman who bowled left-arm orthodox spin. He scored 4,769 runs with a highest score of 204 not out among six centuries and took 95 wickets with a best performance of six for 65.
