= William Oscroft =

English cricketer (1843–1905)

William Oscroft (16 December 1843 – 10 October 1905) was an English professional cricketer who played first-class cricket from 1864 to 1882, mainly for Nottinghamshire County Cricket Club and made 244 known appearances in first-class matches.

Oscroft was a right-handed batsman and a right-arm fast roundarm bowler who occasionally played as a wicket-keeper. Among the representative teams he played for were the North (1864–1879), the All England Eleven (1865–1878), the Players (1871–1880) and the United North of England Eleven (1872–1879).

Sporting positions
Preceded by Richard Daft	Nottinghamshire County cricket captain 1881-1882	Succeeded by Alfred Shaw
