= John Oscroft (cricketer, born 1807) =

English cricketer

Personal information
- Full name: John Oscroft
- Born: 21 July 1807; Arnold, Nottinghamshire, England
- Died: 28 September 1857 (aged 50); Nottingham, Nottinghamshire, England
- Batting: Unknown
- Bowling: Unknown

Domestic team information
- Years: Team
- 1842–1848: Nottinghamshire
- 1834–1848: Nottingham Cricket Club

Career statistics
Competition	First-class
Matches	9
Runs scored	137
Batting average	10.53
100s/50s	–/–
Top score	28
Balls bowled	20
Wickets	2
Bowling average	?
5 wickets in innings	–
10 wickets in match	–
Best bowling	1/?
Catches/stumpings	4/–
- Source: Cricinfo, 19 February 2013

John Oscroft (21 July 1807 – 28 September 1857) was an English cricketer. Oscroft's batting and bowling styles are unknown. He was born at Arnold, Nottinghamshire.

Oscroft made his first-class debut for Nottingham Cricket Club against Cambridge Town Club in 1834 at Parker's Piece. He made two further first-class appearances in 1834, making a second appearance against Cambridge Town Club at the Forest New Ground and an appearance against Sheffield Cricket Club at Hyde Park Ground, Sheffield. His next first-class appearance came in 1842 for the Gentlemen of Nottinghamshire against the Players of Nottinghamshire at Trent Bridge, with him also making his first-class debut for Nottinghamshire against England in that same season. He made four further first-class appearances for Nottinghamshire, the last of which came against Sussex in 1848. In his nine first-class matches, Oscroft scored 137 runs at an average of 10.53, with a high score of 28. He also took two wickets with the ball.

He died at Nottingham, Nottinghamshire on 28 September 1857.
