= Wilfred Payton =

English cricketer

Cricket information
- Batting: Right-handed

Career statistics
Competition	First-class
Matches	491
Runs scored	22,132
Batting average	34.31
100s/50s	39/114
Top score	169
Balls bowled	78
Wickets	1
Bowling average	68.00
5 wickets in innings	0
10 wickets in match	0
Best bowling	1/18
Catches/stumpings	148/0
- Source: CricketArchive, 5 August 2020

Wilfred Richard Daniel Payton (3 February 1882 – 2 May 1943) was an English first-class cricketer who played for Nottinghamshire County Cricket Club.

Payton was a right-handed middle order batsman and made 39 hundreds, his first was an innings of 133 against the touring West Indians in 1906. He topped 1000 runs per season every year from 1921 to 1929 with a best of 1864 runs at 47.79 in 1926. His only first-class wicket was Northamptonshire's Bernard Atkinson.

Payton's son, also named Wilfred, followed in his footsteps and played with Nottinghamshire in 1935.
