= 1950 County Championship =

English cricket tournament

- Cricket format: First-class cricket
- Tournament format: League system
- Champions: Lancashire & Surrey
- Participants: 17
- Matches: 238
- Most runs: Laurie Fishlock, (Surrey); 2,077
- Most wickets: Roy Tattersall, (Lancashire); 163

The 1950 County Championship was the 51st officially organised running of the County Championship.

Lancashire and Surrey shared the Championship title. Glamorgan's record of nine matches where no decision could be made on first innings is a record.

== Table ==
- 12 points for a win
- 4 points for a tie
- 4 points to each team in a draw in which scores finish level
- 4 points for first innings lead in a lost or drawn match
- 2 points for tie on first innings in a lost or drawn match

	Team	P	W	L	D	T	No Dec	1st Inns Lead	1st Inns Tie	Pts
=1	Lancashire	28	16	2	10	0	0	7	0	220
=1	Surrey	28	17	4	7	0	1	4	0	220
3	Yorkshire	28	14	2	12	0	2	8	0	200
4	Warwickshire	28	8	6	14	0	1	9	0	132
5	Derbyshire	28	8	9	11	0	2	7	0	124
6	Worcestershire	28	7	9	12	0	3	7	1	114
=7	Gloucestershire	28	5	6	17 (Note: Gloucestershire were awarded eight points for the draw against Sussex, which they won under one-day rules.)	0	0	11	0	112
=7	Somerset	28	8	8	12	0	2	4	0	112
9	Kent	28	6	12	9	1	1	8	0	108
10	Northamptonshire	28	6	4	18	0	3	8	0	104
11	Glamorgan	28	6	4	18	0	9	7	0	100
12	Hampshire	28	6	9	12 (Note: Hampshire were awarded eight points for the draw against Middlesex, which they won under one-day rules.)	1	2	3	0	96
13	Sussex	28	5	10	13	0	1	8	0	92
14	Middlesex	28	5	11	12	0	3	6	0	84
15	Nottinghamshire	28	3	6	19	0	2	8	0	68
16	Leicestershire	28	3	13	12	0	1	7	0	64
17	Essex	28	4	12	12	0	1	3	0	60
