= 1951 County Championship =

English cricket tournament

- Cricket format: First-class cricket (3 days)
- Tournament format: League system
- Champions: Warwickshire (2nd title)
- Participants: 17
- Matches: 238
- Most runs: Jack Robertson (2,452 for Middlesex)
- Most wickets: Bob Appleyard (169 for Yorkshire)

The 1951 County Championship was the 52nd officially organised running of the County Championship, and ran from 5 May to 4 September 1951. Warwickshire County Cricket Club claimed their second title.

== Table ==
- 12 points for a win
- 6 points to each team in a match in which scores finish level
- 4 points for first innings lead in a lost or drawn match
- 2 points for tie on first innings in a lost or drawn match

	Team	P	W	L	D	No Dec	1st Inns Lead	1st Inns Tie	Pts
1	Warwickshire (C)	28	16	2	10	0	6	0	216
2	Yorkshire	28	12	3	11	2	10	0	184
3	Lancashire	28	8	1	15	4	10	0	136
4	Worcestershire	28	9	5	12	2	6	0	132
5	Glamorgan	28	8	3	14	3	8	0	128
6	Surrey	28	7	6	13	2	9	0	120
7	Middlesex	28	7	5	14	2	8	0	116
8	Essex	28	6	2	18	2	9	1	110
9	Hampshire	28	5	6	14	3	10	0	100
10	Sussex	28	6	6	15	1	5	1	94
11	Derbyshire	28	5	4	18	1	8	0	92
12	Gloucestershire	28	5	8	13	2	7	0	88
13	Northamptonshire	28	4	3	18	3	8	0	80
14	Somerset	28	5	12	9	2	4	0	76
15	Leicestershire	28	4	7	16	1	4	0	64
16	Kent	28	4	14	9	1	3	0	60
17	Nottinghamshire	28	1	11	13	3	7	0	40
	Source: CricketArchive								

== Statistics ==
Most runs
Aggregate	Average	Player	County
2,452	61.30	Jack Robertson	Middlesex
2,046	42.62	Arthur Fagg	Kent
2,018	38.80	Maurice Tremlett	Somerset
1,903	43.25	Don Kenyon	Worcestershire
1,825	44.51	George Emmett	Gloucestershire
1,819	58.67	Freddie Jakeman	Northamptonshire
1,817	42.25	John Langridge	Sussex

Most wickets
Aggregate	Average	Player	County
169	13.93	Bob Appleyard	Yorkshire
145	17.69	Eric Hollies	Warwickshire
127	19.55	Jack Young	Middlesex
123	16.84	Jim McConnon	Glamorgan
123	17.82	Cliff Gladwin	Derbyshire
118	17.97	Dick Howorth	Worcestershire
118	19.91	Derek Shackleton	Hampshire

== See also ==
- 1951 English cricket season
