= Shell Technology Centre Thornton =

Former Shell research and development centre in Cheshire, England

- Interactive map of the Shell Technology Centre Thornton area
- Former names: Thornton Research Centre; Cheshire Innovation Park

General information
- Type: Research and development centre
- Location: Ince, Cheshire, England, Pool Lane, Ince, Chester, CH2 4NU
- Coordinates: 53.274°N 2.828°W
- Construction started: 1940
- Completed: 1941 (first laboratory)
- Inaugurated: 20 May 1948 (post-war research centre)

The Shell Technology Centre Thornton (STCT), formerly the Thornton Research Centre, was a major research and development centre operated by Shell at Ince, Cheshire, England, adjacent to the Stanlow Oil Refinery. Established during the Second World War as an aero-engine research laboratory, Thornton developed into one of Shell's principal British research establishments. Its work included aviation and automotive fuels, lubricants, combustion, engine technology, fuel cells, petrochemicals, environmental science and other energy technologies.

The laboratories were consolidated as the Thornton Research Centre in 1947. The site was renamed Cheshire Innovation Park in 1998, when laboratory and office space was opened to outside commercial tenants, and Shell Technology Centre Thornton in 2006. Shell announced in 2012 that the centre's laboratory operations would close as part of a reorganisation of its international research network. The University of Chester acquired the site in 2014 and developed it as Thornton Science Park.

== History ==
=== Wartime origins ===
During the rapid development of aero engines in the late 1930s, Shell concluded that specialised research was required if aviation fuels and lubricants were to keep pace with advances in engine technology. In 1939 the company decided to establish a dedicated aero-engine laboratory in Britain. Thornton was selected partly because of its proximity to the Stanlow refinery, allowing researchers to investigate crude oils as potential sources of aviation fuel.

Construction of the first Thornton Aero Engine Research Laboratory began in the spring of 1940 and was completed in 1941. Researchers worked in temporary accommodation on the site while the building was under construction. Additional laboratories and engine-testing facilities followed, extending the work to chemical and metallurgical research, lubricating oils, diesel fuels and chemicals derived from petroleum.

In April 1942 a government committee took control of the laboratory's research programme while Shell continued to manage the facility. This arrangement lasted until 1946. Wartime work included the testing and development of fuels and lubricants for aircraft engines including the Rolls-Royce Merlin used in the Supermarine Spitfire and the Allison engines used in variants of the North American P-51 Mustang. Later accounts also credited Thornton research with work on fuel-line vapour-lock problems in the Spitfire and with supporting early British jet-engine development.

=== Thornton Research Centre ===
Full control of the laboratories returned to Shell after the war. In 1947 the various facilities were coordinated as the Thornton Research Centre, initially organised around Engine and Chemical Divisions. In 1948 the centre contained about 730,000 sq ft (68,000 m^{2}) of floor space and employed 895 people, of whom 323 were qualified technical staff engaged in research and 572 worked in workshops, technical services and administration.

One of the first directors of the post-war centre was geophysicist and former army officer Ralph Alger Bagnold, who served as director from 1947 to 1949. The research centre was formally opened on 20 May 1948.

Early post-war research included combustion, fuel injection, fuel atomisation, lubricants and chemicals derived from petroleum. Contemporary reports described work using quartz combustion tubes and investigating direct fuel injection and alternative fuels.

Thornton expanded during the 1950s and 1960s. In 1955 the centre employed about 870 people, including chemists, engineers, physicists, metallurgists and statisticians, supported by specialist workshop and technical staff. By 1962 employment was close to 1,000, including about 240 graduates, and Thornton was described as the largest Shell research centre in the United Kingdom.

The centre developed much of its own experimental equipment. Its Applied Physics Division designed and built specialist instruments when suitable commercial apparatus was unavailable, while engineering workshops supported the construction and maintenance of test rigs and research equipment.

Vehicle testing associated with Thornton was conducted at the former RAF Poulton before being transferred to RAF Hooton Park in 1957 after flying operations there ceased.

=== Consolidation and expansion ===
By 1976 Thornton was one of Shell's two principal research centres in the United Kingdom, the other being the company's Sittingbourne research establishment in Kent. Thornton then employed about 950 people, roughly half of whom were directly engaged in research and development. Its principal areas included fuels, lubricants and bitumen, natural gas, marine technology, transportation and storage, together with general research.

The centre's research activities were supported by computing facilities, engineering workshops, a fuel- and lubricant-blending unit, technical information services, photographic facilities and specialist test rigs. The blending unit produced experimental formulations and reference fuels used in engine testing and field trials.

The 1970s represented a period of expansion, with employment reaching around 1,000. Staffing fell during the 1980s, but Thornton remained one of Shell's important international laboratories.

In 1994 Shell announced a £70 million redevelopment of the centre. At the time Thornton employed about 600 people and concentrated on fuels and lubricants technology, combustion science and hazard analysis, and environmental science. The programme included new laboratory wings, testing facilities and the transfer of environmental and additives research from the company's Sittingbourne site.

In 1998 Shell made part of the site available to external commercial tenants and renamed the complex Cheshire Innovation Park. Marketing focused on laboratory and office accommodation for scientific and technical organisations, but relatively few outside companies took space. The site was consequently renamed Shell Technology Centre Thornton in 2006. New staff facilities were added in 2009.

In the centre's final years Shell continued to use Thornton for research and technical consultancy in fuels, lubricants, biofuels, automotive applications, environmental technology and technical safety. Research papers continued to identify the site as a Shell centre for advanced tribology and energy-efficiency work.

=== Closure and later use ===
In January 2012 Shell announced that the laboratory operations at Thornton would close by 2014 as part of a review of the company's global technology network. Almost 300 scientists were then based at the centre. Shell said that laboratory work would move largely to its technology operations in Hamburg, with other activities distributed to sites elsewhere in its international network. Some positions were also expected to move to London and Manchester.

In 2013 the University of Chester announced an agreement to acquire the site and develop it as a science park and a base for a new engineering and technology faculty. Ownership transferred from Shell to the university on 31 March 2014. The former Shell complex subsequently operated as Thornton Science Park.

== Research ==
Thornton combined laboratory science with engine and vehicle testing, engineering workshops, pilot facilities and specialised experimental apparatus. Its research programme changed substantially during more than seventy years of operation, but fuels, combustion, lubrication and the performance of energy systems remained recurring themes.

=== Aviation fuels and lubricants ===
Aviation research was the original reason for Thornton's establishment. During the Second World War the laboratory investigated the performance of aviation fuels and lubricants under increasingly demanding engine conditions.

The centre remained involved in aviation research after the war. The original aero-engine laboratory, later known as Building 50, was subsequently used for the testing of fuels, lubricants and greases for Concorde. Historic England records that Thornton's work also contributed improvements to Concorde's fuel system before the aircraft's first flight.

Thornton also developed and operated specialist rigs for studying the behaviour of aviation fuels and fuel-system components. Aviation remained one of the centre's recognised research areas into the 1990s, when the site was described as Shell's principal British research facility for petrol, diesel, aviation fuels and lubricants.

=== Automotive fuels and lubricants ===
Automotive fuels and lubricants became one of Thornton's principal post-war research fields. Shell's corporate history identifies Thornton as the birthplace of both Shell with ICA and Shell X-100, as well as later multigrade and ashless engine lubricants.

Ignition Control Additive (ICA) was introduced into Shell petrol in Britain in January 1954. The additive used tricresyl phosphate to alter lead-containing combustion deposits that could otherwise cause pre-ignition and spark-plug fouling. Shell's later history attributed the development of the product to the Thornton laboratories.

Lubrication research at Thornton included engine wear, lubricant chemistry and the behaviour of lubricated surfaces. In October 1960 a new Engine Lubricating Oil Laboratory was opened at the centre with an international symposium on Wear in the Gasoline Engine.

The centre also worked with vehicle manufacturers. During the late 1960s Thornton collaborated with British Leyland on research into vehicle exhaust emissions in response to increasingly stringent pollution regulations, particularly in the United States.

In 1985 Shell opened the £14 million Engine Laboratory Modernisation and Automation (ELMA) facility at Thornton. It contained sixteen automated engine test beds for testing fuels and lubricants under different operating and driving conditions. Work using the facility contributed to the development of Formula Shell petrol, introduced in 1986.

=== Combustion and autoignition ===
Thornton became an important centre for fundamental combustion research as well as product development. Researchers investigated flame chemistry, engine knock, pre-ignition and the processes leading to spontaneous ignition of hydrocarbon fuels.

In 1968 W. S. Affleck and A. Thomas of Thornton described an opposed-piston rapid compression machine designed to reproduce engine-like pressure and temperature conditions under controlled laboratory conditions. The apparatus was used to study chemical processes preceding ignition and was later transferred to the University of Leeds, where derivatives of the machine continued to be used in combustion research decades later.

Research undertaken at Thornton during the 1970s also produced what became known as the Shell autoignition model, a reduced chemical-kinetic model developed to represent the autoignition of hydrocarbon fuels under engine conditions. It was fitted against experiments using the rapid compression machine and subsequently became widely used in computational studies of engine knock and ignition.

=== Fuel cells ===
Thornton carried out research on fuel cell technology from the 1960s. A methanol-fuelled cell was demonstrated at the centre in December 1964. Researchers including K. R. Williams subsequently published work on the design and operation of dissolved-methanol fuel cells.

Shell's work on direct methanol fuel cells continued into the following decades and included research into electrocatalysts and the feasibility of using liquid-fuel cells in road vehicles. A later review by researchers associated with the programme documented Shell's long-running development work and the technical obstacles to commercialising methanol–air fuel cells.

Thornton also investigated fuel-cell propulsion for cars. In 1967 Shell Research converted a DAF 44 into an experimental hybrid fuel-cell electric vehicle. The petrol engine was replaced by an electric motor controlled by a solid-state system developed with the Lucas Research Centre. Fuel cells using hydrazine and air supplied the base electrical load, while lead-acid batteries supplied additional power during acceleration.

The converted DAF demonstrated the feasibility of using a fuel cell as part of an automotive propulsion system, although its weight and fuel-handling requirements made the system impractical for commercial vehicles at the time. The car is preserved in the Science Museum Group collection.

=== Fuel economy ===
Improving vehicle fuel consumption became an important research theme during the 1970s. Thornton researchers D. R. Blackmore and A. Thomas edited the 1977 technical volume Fuel Economy of the Gasoline Engine, which examined the influence of fuel properties, additives, vehicle maintenance, emission controls and lubricants on fuel consumption. The book also included a chapter devoted to mileage-marathon vehicles.

In 1977 Thornton organised a Shell Mileage Marathon at Mallory Park in Leicestershire, in which university teams competed to design vehicles capable of travelling the greatest distance on a given quantity of fuel. The programme formed part of Shell's wider series of fuel-economy competitions, which later developed into the Shell Eco-marathon.

=== Environmental and safety research ===
Environmental science became an increasingly important part of Thornton's programme during the later twentieth century. By 1994 Shell identified environmental science and combustion-related hazard analysis as two of the centre's four main research areas, alongside fuels and lubricants technology and combustion science.

The redevelopment announced that year incorporated environmental and additives research previously undertaken at Sittingbourne. New laboratories and larger grouped research buildings were intended both to modernise the site and to consolidate research that had formerly been distributed among a larger number of smaller facilities.

In its final decades Thornton also carried out work on process safety, technical risk, biofuels and energy efficiency. The centre continued to publish research on lubricant friction and its effect on the energy consumption of vehicles and industrial machinery shortly before its closure.

=== Motorsport ===
Thornton supported Shell's technical partnership with Scuderia Ferrari. In its later years the centre developed and tested racing fuels and lubricants for Ferrari's Formula One programme, alongside related research on road fuels. A 2009 report on Shell's Formula One laboratory at Thornton described a specialist team developing fuel, lubricants and greases for Ferrari under the restrictions of the Formula One technical regulations.

== Site ==
The research centre occupied a roughly triangular site of approximately 26 hectares (64 acres) immediately east of the Stanlow refinery. Pool Lane formed its eastern boundary and the Hooton–Helsby railway line ran along its northern side. The centre developed as a self-contained complex of laboratories, engine- and rig-testing facilities, engineering workshops, offices and support buildings.

The surviving Building 50 was the original aero-engine laboratory constructed in 1940–41. Designed by aviation pioneer Sir Alan Cobham with the architectural practice Burnet, Tait & Lorne, it is a U-shaped brick building in a simplified International Modern style. Its rear wings originally contained laboratories and engine-test beds, while offices and a conference room occupied the front range.

Building 50 was designated a Grade II listed building in 2007. Historic England cited both its architectural character and its historical and technological importance to aviation-fuel research during the Second World War. Much of the original plan and a number of internal features survive.

== Training and outreach ==
Although research and development remained the centre's primary function, Thornton maintained links with schools, colleges and universities. By the 1970s the centre received thousands of visitors each year and offered work experience, apprenticeships and industrial placements. University students and doctoral researchers also spent periods at Thornton undertaking industrial research.

During the 1980s and 1990s Shell participated in technician-training and youth-training programmes, while employees were encouraged to continue formal scientific and engineering education. The centre also provided equipment, staff assistance and visits for schools and colleges in the surrounding area.

== See also ==
- Shell Technology Centre, for other Shell research and technology centres
- Shell Technology Centre Bangalore
- Shell Technology Center Houston
- Energy Transition Campus Amsterdam, formerly Shell Technology Centre Amsterdam
- Castrol Technology Centre
- Esso Research Centre
- Sunbury Research Centre
- Widnes Laboratory
- Winnington Laboratory
