= Sunbury Research Centre =

- BP Sunbury, BP International Ltd, International Centre for Business & Technology, ICBT Sunbury
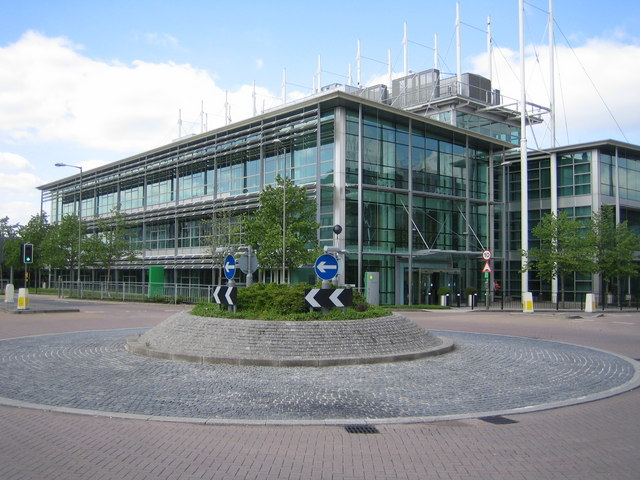
- April 2007

- Location within Surrey
- Former names: Sunbury Research Station, BP Research Centre, Sunbury Research Laboratories
- Alternative names: Sunbury Business park

General information
- Type: Energy Research Centre
- Location: Chertsey Road, Sunbury-on-Thames, Surrey (former Middlesex), TW16 7LN
- Coordinates: 51.43°N 0.43°W
- Elevation: 45 m (148 ft)
- Current tenants: 3,500 staff in 55 business teams
- Completed: 1917
- Inaugurated: 1917
- Client: BP
- Landlord: BP

Dimensions
- Other dimensions: 33 acres

The Sunbury Research Centre -- also known as ICBT Sunbury—is a main research institute of BP in north-east Surrey.

== History ==
=== Origination ===
It began in 1917 as the Sunbury Research Station. Research began with the employment of two chemists to look into the viscosity of fuel oil for the Navy in the First World War, and the production of toluene.

The two first organic chemists were Dr Albert Ernest Dunstan and Dr Ferdinand Bernard Thole, in the basement of a country house called 'Meadhurst', formerly the home of Sir George William Kekewich. Both of these chemists had together worked at East Ham Technical College. Albert received a PhD in Viscosity from UCL in October 1910, working under the Irish physicist Frederick Thomas Trouton FRS, and Scottish chemist Sir William Ramsay. Together they had written 'A Text Book of Practical Chemistry for Technical Institutes', published by Methuen in November 1911, and 'The Viscosity of Liquids', published by Longman Green in 1914. Thole was awarded the OBE in the 1960 Birthday Honours. Albert died aged 85 in 1963, having been Chief Chemist of BP for thirty years. His son, Bernard Dunstan, grew up in the 'Meadhurst' house, and died aged 97 in 2017; Bernard's wife Diana Armfield is 104. Albert's grandson is David Dunstan, Professor of Physics at Queen Mary University of London. In the 1950s, Dr Thole worked for the Ministry of Fuel and Power. Both left the technical college in September 1917.

=== Early petroleum refining ===
In the 1920s research took place into cracking, at the plant at Uphall in Scotland (West Lothian). The first new building opened in July 1931. 76 staff were there in 1929, 99 in 1934 and 197 in 1939.

The first laboratory was demolished in July 1936. The main refinery of the company was at Abadan in Iran. Removing sulphur, from the refining process, was developed from the early 1930s, but this would additionally cause corrosion. Thermal cracking of refinery products would move to catalytic cracking methods from 1937, after work by Eugene Houdry in the US.

Leaded petrol was introduced as 'BP Plus' on 15 April 1931, taking the octane number from 66 to 74, becoming 'BP Ethyl' in August 1933. Aviation fuels were difficult to make, as a high octane number was required. By making di-isobutene, an 88-octane fuel could be made, with production at Abadan from 1937. By adding hydrogen under pressure, with a catalyst, it made the saturated iso-octane (2,2,4-Trimethylpentane), made at Abadan from 1938 for high-octane aviation fuel.

=== Discovery of the alkylation process ===
In July 1936, at the research centre's annual conference on chemistry, ways to make iso-octane were looked at, with a chemist Dr Thomas Tait accidentally inventing the alkylation process, via the addition of sulphuric acid in a pentane solvent, which was much quicker than hydrogenation over a catalyst.

This process is still an important part of aviation and automobile fuel refining. It was discovered that isobutane would react with the butenes present. It was largely an accidental discovery, but an important one. Sunbury patented the process in January 1938, and had built an experimental production facility by December 1936, being first made at Abadan from January 1939. The process was given the name 'alkylation' in December 1939.

=== Second World War ===
As well as the Abadan Refinery, oil came from the Haifa oil refinery in Mandatory Palestine, a British-run territory, which was of great importance until Italy (Sicily) was invaded in July 1943, so allowing more exports from Iran again. There was also the Alwand refinery in Iraq. The Llandarcy Oil Refinery was bombed by the Luftwaffe on 10 July and 1 September in 1940, and 18 February 1941.

By July 1941 oil supplies from Iran were rapidly dwindling, so the BP head office required around 100,000 tonnes of crude oil, to be sourced from within England. Only around 25,000 tonnes was being found each year, from within England. By September 1942, Eakring in Nottinghamshire was producing the 100,000 tons, with a field at Caunton discovered in March 1943, with production from May, and another field at Nocton, in Kesteven, also discovered in 1943, with production from December. Onshore oil in the UK, in 1943, produced 115,000 tons.

From work at Sunbury, more aviation fuel could be made at Abadan from 1943, with a new patented process. From work by Merrell Fenske of Pennsylvania State University, known for the Fenske equation, Sunbury chemists developed superfractionation, for aviation fuel manufacture at Abadan, from 1943. Manufacture of 100-octane aviation fuel at Abadan went from around 70,000 tons in 1941 to over a million tons by 1945.

But it was the Baton Rouge Refinery, in Louisiana, owned by Standard Oil (Esso), that provided most high-octane aviation fuel (British Air Ministry 100 octane) for the RAF during the Battle of Britain, from July 1940. The fuel was developed at the Standard Oil Development Company in Linden, New Jersey and at the Esso Research Centre in England, by chemical engineers Bill Sweeney and Alexander Ogston, who was British. Rod Banks had made the first calculations of effect of the better fuel in the Merlin engine. The Luftwaffe Me 109 pilots such as Adolf Galland, who had 87-octane fuel, could not comprehend where such a sudden increase in power of the RAF fighter aircraft came from. 100-octane fuel allowed the Merlin engine to reach maximum horse-power on take-offs and climbs, giving the engine 30% more power, than previously possible. Additionally, the Spitfire could make the type of tight manoeuvres that would cause the Me 109 airframe to disintegrate, such as when pulling out of dives.

Staff were around 200 in 1939, but was much reduced until 1944. In 1943 an aero-engine test facility was built, with a Bristol Hercules engine. Until 1943, many head office staff had moved to the Sunbury site. Sunbury also developed the Fog Investigation and Dispersal Operation system for RAF airfields.

=== Post-war ===
By the 1950s, BP Research was in a 39-acre site in Sunbury.

Sunbury trained Iranian engineers in the early 1950s. The company became BP in 1954, with a new logo in 1958. The BP Corrosion Control System was developed at the site, to limit corrosion by sulphur, by introducing aqueous ammonia into flues, to react with sulphur trioxide, to form ammonium sulphate.

Geophysical research had also taken place at Kirklington Hall Research Station in Nottinghamshire, until 1957. The geophysical laboratory opened at the end of 1957, after the relevant staff from Kirklington had moved out in November. By early 1958, Kirklington Hall had been sold.

Products that the British Petroleum Company made in the 1950s were BP Motor Spirit and BP Energol (visco-static motor oil), developed at Sunbury, which reduced engine wear by 80%.

Around 1958, the site was expanded with a new Physics laboratory and five other buildings. A linear electron accelerator was installed. By 1960 the site was 19 acres, with 1300 staff. On Saturday 3 December 1960 there was an explosion in a laboratory, with around fifty firemen attending for more than an hour, with three scientists injured.

The first two laboratories, costing £500,000, for the BP Chemicals division opened in September 1961. On Wednesday 22 September 1965 the £500,000 four-storey Dunstan Laboratory was opened by Albert's daughter, Mary Dunstan. The site now had 1700 staff, and research cost £4m per year.

The huge BP Baglan Bay chemical plant opened in October 1963, with feedstock from Llandarcy oil refinery.

On Thursday 10 December 1970 three thieves, driving a Rover 3.5 (Rover P6), rammed a car taking the payroll money to the site, smashing the windscreen, and taking £10,000. Thieves were showered in blue dye, on Cadbury Road.

Britain would not produce much oil of its own until the mid-1970s when North Sea oil arrived at the Forties Oil Field.

=== Construction ===
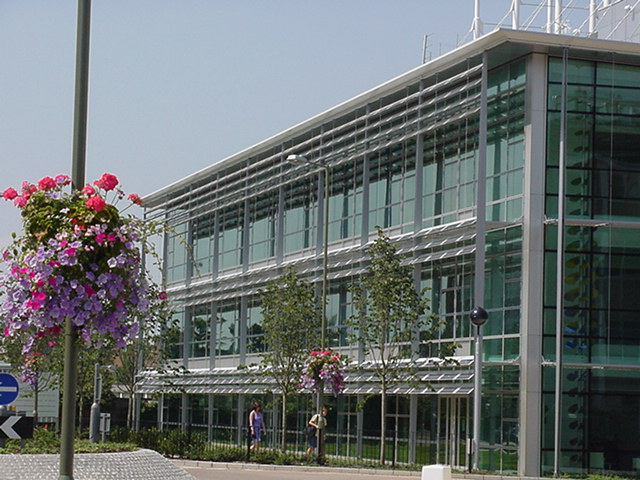
Offices in July 2000

Three new buildings were built from 1998 as part of Phase 1. Since 2001, four new buildings were built as part of Phase 2.

== Research ==
=== Petroleum refining ===
A new catalytic hydrofining process, called ferrofining, for lubricants was developed in 1961, in conjunction with the French division of BP (Société Française des Pétroles) at the Dunkirk refinery in northern France, with ferrofiner units being installed at the Llandarcy Oil Refinery, the Kent Refinery, and the Kwinana Oil Refinery in Australia.

=== Chemical industry ===
A process was developed for the new BP Ruhr refinery at Dinslaken in West Germany, to make high purity paraffins for the chemical industry.

=== North Sea gas ===
Research into the chemical composition of North Sea gas began in November 1965.

=== Air pollution ===
Air pollution research began from the late 1960s.

=== Energy efficiency ===
More energy efficient oil refineries were developed from the early 1980s, in conjunction with GKN Birwelco, a metal fabrication company of Halesowen.

=== Pipelines ===
With North Sea oil becoming important the centre developed ways to seal cracks in oil pipelines, and ways to extend the life of the BP Forties Oil Field by ten years were evaluated by the head of BP research, Sir John Cadogan in 1984, with tests at Bothamsall in Nottinghamshire.

=== Corrosion ===
In 1984 BP Research International looked at reducing corrosion of paint.

=== Solar panels ===
Solar panels were extensively researched from the 1980s.

=== Aviation fires ===
In 1991 Panos Papagervos developed methods to quickly extinguish aviation fuel fires.

=== Clean fuels ===
In the early 1990s it opened a £12m clean fuel laboratory.

=== Computer science ===
New methods in computer science are undertaken in the Information Science department, working with the French computer scientist Jean-Raymond Abrial in the 1980s, with the B-Method

=== Hydrogen economy ===
In the past two decades, hydrogen technologies have been investigated.

== Other operations ==
Air BP, for aviation fuel, is headquartered on the site.

== Structure ==
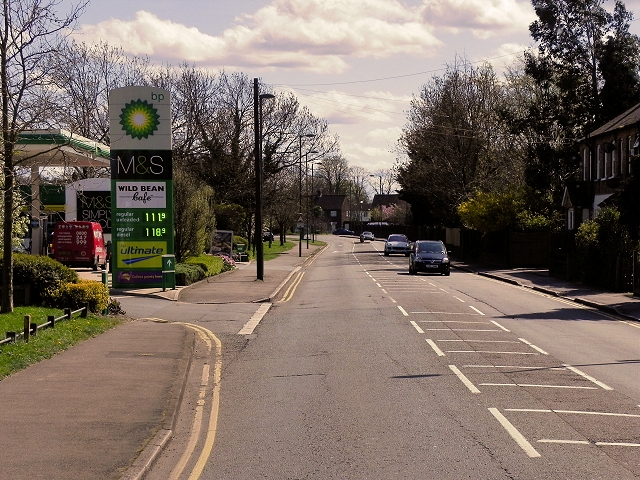
Nearby filling station in April 2015

It is situated off the A244 (via the A308) in the north of Sunbury-on-Thames, and Surrey, on the Surrey boundary with London. To the east nearby is Sunbury Common.

The retail division of BP UK is at Witan Gate House. BP employs around 15,000 people in the UK.

It has an enhanced oil recovery laboratory.

== Visits ==
- in October 1939 Arthur Tedder, 1st Baron Tedder visited to discuss supplies of 100-octane aviation fuel, being made in Iran
- Mohammad Reza Pahlavi, the Shah of Iran from 1941, visited the site on Saturday 24 July 1948, where he opened an engine-testing facility
- on Tuesday 26 June 1956, the chairman of BP, Basil Jackson, laid a commemoration to start construction of the Analytical & Physics Laboratory, built by Costain
- on Friday 6 July 1962 the Duke of Edinburgh opened the 38,000 sq ft four-storey chemicals laboratory, where he took lunch with the chairman of BP, Sir Maurice Bridgeman, with Sqn Ldr David Checketts
- in 1985, the Education Secretary Sir Keith Joseph started the construction of three multi-storey laboratory blocks, to open in 1986, 1987 and 1988
- in January 2010, a group of MPs visited the site

== Alumni ==
- Stanley Birch, joined BP in 1923, studied at Imperial College under Sir Jocelyn Field Thorpe, at Sunbury he developed ways to reduce sulphur content with sodium hypochlorite in the 1930s, and methods of making high octane aviation fuel in 1936, and for the Great Western Railway, with the alkylation unit process, later made at the Abadan Refinery in Iran
- Eric William Fawcett, one of the inventors of polythene at the ICI Winnington Laboratory, worked on development of aviation fuel in 1941
- Denis Henry Desty FRS,
- Evelyn Beale, physicist, later helped to develop radar in Suffolk in 1939
- Robert Chalmers Pitkethly, chemist
- Alan Grint, received the Beilby Medal and Prize in 1984, from the Royal Society of Chemistry
- Prof Kenneth John Packer FRS
- Richard Ward (businessman), 1988-91
- Sir David Klenerman FRS, known for new methods of DNA sequencing, part of the Laser Spectroscopy Group at Sunbury
- Leslie Bretherick, chemist
- Jack Birks CBE, engineer, of significance to oil discoveries in the North Sea (1957-59)
- Brian Gilvary, chairman of Ineos Energy
- biostratigraphers John Athersuch and Robert Wynn Jones

=== Chief geologists ===
- George Martin Lees FRS
- Norman Leslie Falcon FRS

== See also ==
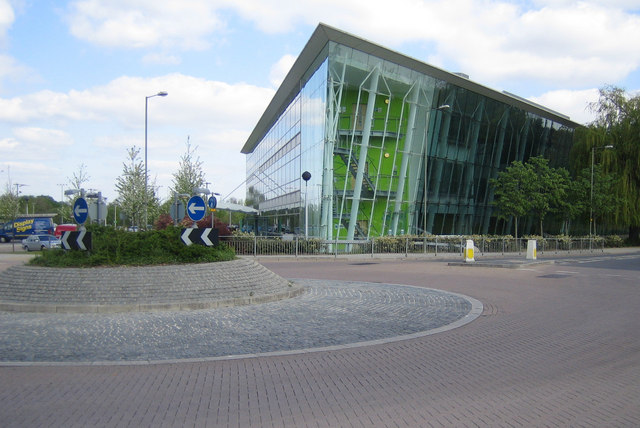
Another building in April 2007

- Castrol Technology Centre
- Oil fields operated by BP
- Peter Mather (businessman), Head of BP UK
- National Physical Laboratory (United Kingdom)
- British Geological Survey in Nottinghamshire
- French Institute of Petroleum
- Gas Council Engineering Research Station in North Tyneside (it closed in 1995)
