= Kirklington Hall Research Station =

Research institute in Nottinghamshire, England

Coordinates: 53.1082°N 0.9698°W

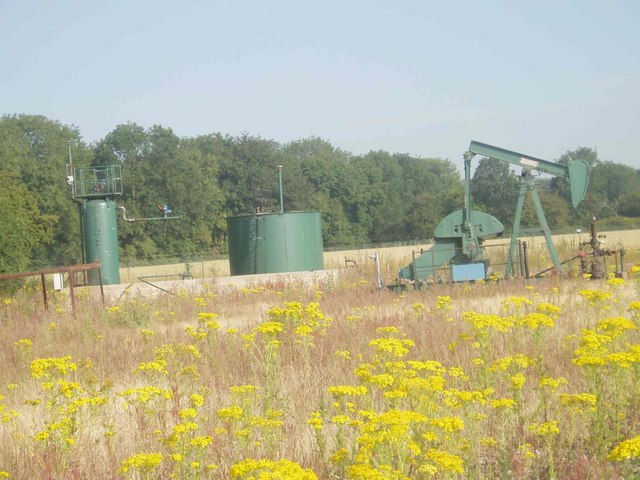
Oil well at Kirklington in April 2006, discovered by BP in 1985

Kirklington Hall Research Station was a geophysical research institute of BP in Kirklington, Nottinghamshire. During the 1950s it was the main research site of BP.

== Background ==
Cricketer John Boddam-Whetham was born at the site in 1843. Sir Albert Bennett, 1st Baronet, Liberal MP from 1922-23 for Mansfield, lived there from 1920. The Bennett baronets was formed in 1929. Lady Evelyn Maude Robinson, was the owner from around 1930, and the wife of Sir John Robinson of Worksop, who died aged 74 on Saturday 2 December 1944.

The previous owner died aged 73 on Friday 14 December 1945, leaving £138,365 in her will. In June 1945 it was put up for auction, with 631 acres, 15 bedrooms, 6 bathrooms, and 11 servants rooms. It was sold for £24,500 in Derby in July 1945.

Nottinghamshire County Council for two years was looking to buy the property, but it was a big investment, for a residential further education college; it chose another site in July 1947.

== History ==
=== BP ===
As part of the East Midlands Oil Province, oil was found in eastern Nottinghamshire. It was also known as the BP Research Centre or the Geophysical Centre, part of BP's Exploration Division.

The site was acquired due to proximity of Eakring, in July 1949. The local church, with Hockerton, held garden parties at the site in the summer.

The research centre was established in 1950. Its first employee was Jack Birks, later managing director of BP. From 1950 it was the main geophysical research site of BP, until BP sold the site in 1957 for £12,000. Research moved to Sunbury-on-Thames, in Surrey, in 1957. Sunbury Research Centre had been built around the same time as the Kirklington site, in the early 1950s.

=== Private property ===
It was put up for sale in November 1957. In 1958 there was the possibility of the site being a teacher training college.

From 1958 it was a private school, which had been formed in Southwell in 1945.

It was put up for sale in 1987, with a guide price of £850,000.

Kirklington Hall today is a private school.

== Structure ==
The former site is situated north of the A617.

== Function ==
It conducted geophysical research for exploration for BP. This part of BP is now known as BP Exploration. Work would be conducted on core samples and with seismic methods.

== See also ==
- British Geological Survey, also in Nottinghamshire
- Sunbury Research Centre, where most of BP's research takes place in the UK today.
- Category:Petroleum geology
- Category:Seismology measurement
