= Listed buildings in Hockerton =

Hockerton is a civil parish in the Newark and Sherwood district of Nottinghamshire, England. The parish contains six listed buildings that are recorded in the National Heritage List for England. Of these, one is at Grade II*, the middle of the three grades, and the others are at Grade II, the lowest grade. The parish contains the village of Hockerton and the surrounding countryside, and the listed buildings consist of a church, farmhouses and farm buildings, a pair of cottages and a milestone.

== Key ==
Grade	Criteria
II*	Particularly important buildings of more than special interest
II	Buildings of national importance and special interest

== Buildings ==
Name and location	Photograph	Date	Notes	Grade
St Nicholas' Church; 53.10047°N 0.93211°W		12th century	The church has been altered and extended through the centuries, and it was restored in 1875–76 by James Fowler. It is built in stone with a tile roof, and consists of a nave, a south porch, a chancel and a west tower. The tower has two stages, a chamfered plinth with a moulded band, diagonal buttresses, bands, two gargoyles, and an embattled parapet. On the west side is an arched doorway with a moulded surround and a hood mould, above which is a three-light arched window with a hood mould, and the bell openings have two lights.	II*
Manor Farmhouse; 53.09962°N 0.93202°W		c. 1600	The farmhouse has a timber framed core, and has been encased and extended. It is in red brick with some blue brick diapering, and stone, partly rendered, and has a hipped tile roof. There are two storeys and attics, and nine bays. The windows are a mix of casements and horizontally-sliding sashes, and there are gabled dormers.	II
Barn and stable, Manor Farm; 53.09981°N 0.93238°W	—	Early 18th century	The threshing barn and attached stable are in brick, with dentilled eaves and have pantile roofs with coped gables and kneelers. The barn has two storeys and three bays, and contains a large central doorway with a segmental arch, flanked by buttresses and vents. To the right and recessed is a single-storey stable block with three bays, containing a stable door under a segmental arch and casement windows.	II
Pigeoncote and stable blocks, Hockerton Grange Farm; 53.10129°N 0.93516°W	—	Mid 18th century	The pigeoncote and stable blocks are in red brick, with dogtooth eaves, and they have tile roofs with brick coped crow-stepped gables and kneelers. The pigeoncote has two storeys and an attic and a single bay. It contains a segmental arch, a stable door, semicircular windows, and an arched panel with flight openings and four tiers of perches. Attached to the pigeoncote are two ranges of stable blocks.	II
Bank Cottages; 53.10113°N 0.93167°W		Late 18th century	A pair of cottages, the left cottage added in 1811. They are in red brick with dentilled eaves and pantile roofs. Each cottage has two storeys and two bays, and the right cottage is lower. The windows are horizontally-sliding sashes, and on the left cottage is a dated plaque.	II
Milestone; 53.10714°N 0.95622°W	—	Late 18th century	The milestone is on the north side of the A617 road. It consists of an octagonal stone column 0.5 metres (1 ft 8 in) high with a rounded head, and is inscribed with the distances to Newark and Mansfield.	II
