= St Nicholas' Church, Hockerton =

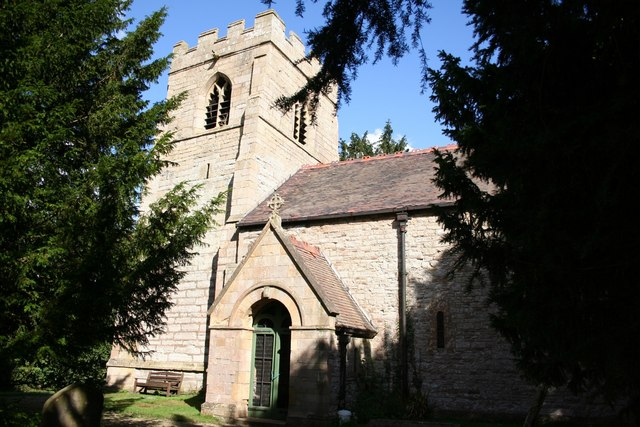
- St Nicholas' Church, Hockerton
- St Nicholas' Church, Hockerton
- 53°6′1.0″N 0°55′56.6″W
- OS grid reference: SK 71596 56445
- Location: Hockerton
- Country: England
- Denomination: Church of England

History
- Dedication: St Nicholas

Architecture
- Heritage designation: Grade II* listed

Administration
- Diocese: Diocese of Southwell and Nottingham
- Archdeaconry: Newark
- Deanery: Newark and Southwell
- Parish: Kirklington with Hockerton

St Nicholas' Church, Hockerton is a Grade II* listed redundant parish church in the Church of England in Hockerton.

== History ==
The church dates from the 12th century. It was restored in 1876 by Charles Hodgson Fowler.

It was in a joint parish with St Swithun's Church, Kirklington.

The church was closed for worship in 2016.

== See also ==
- Grade II* listed buildings in Nottinghamshire
- Listed buildings in Hockerton
