= Kirklington =

Kirklington may refer to:

- Kirklington, North Yorkshire, England
- Kirklington, Nottinghamshire, England

== See also ==
- Kirklinton, Cumbria, England
- Kirtlington, Oxfordshire, England
