= J. L. Eve Construction =

British civil engineer

- Type: Private limited company
- Industry: Civil Engineering
- Founded: 8 February 1930
- Fate: Active
- Headquarters: Stevenage, England

J. L. Eve Construction was a civil engineering company from south London.

== History ==
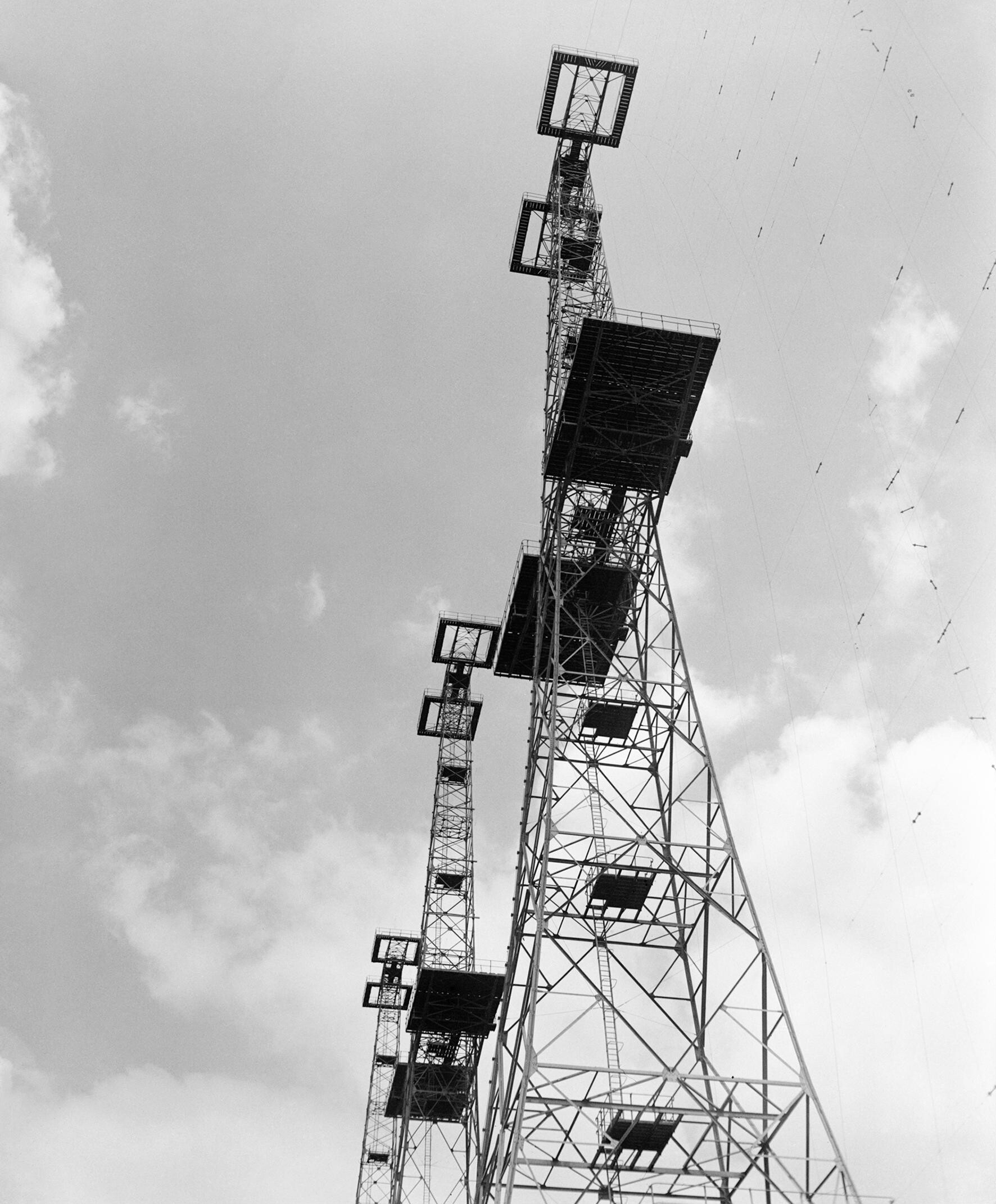
Chain Home towers at Bawdsey in Suffolk in May 1945

The company was formed on 8 February 1930 by John Leonard Eve, who had previously worked as a chief engineer for the river crossings of the Scottish area of the Central Electricity Board (CEB).

Chain Home and National Grid

In the 1930s, the company built steel-lattice towers for the new National Grid and for the Chain Home transmitters. The electrical cable was often supplied by Pirelli UK of Eastleigh in Hampshire (now Prysmian Group).

The Air Ministry had contacted the company to build two test radar transmitters, one on the south coast, and one on Orkney. After 1939, the company extended it to over fifty radar sites. It built the first part of the supergrid in 1952 from Tilbury to Elstree - with a 275kV voltage instead of 132kV and 136 ft instead of 85 ft, with 45 miles for the British Electricity Authority

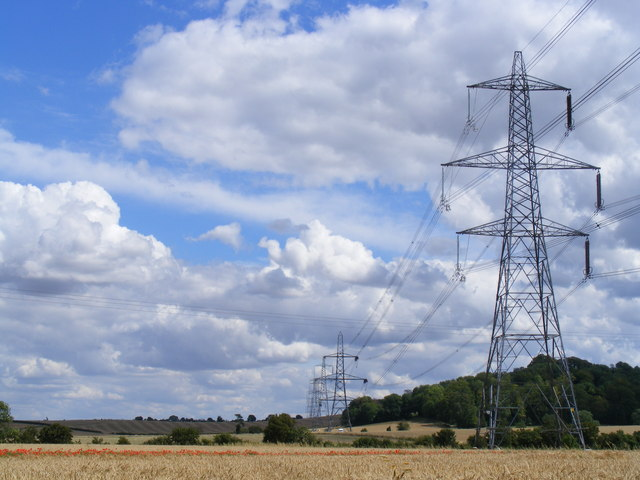
400kV transmission line near Offley in Hertfordshire, which traverses from Chalton, Bedfordshire (Sundon Substation, next to the M1) to St Ippolyts (Wymondley Transforming Station, next to the A602)

== Ownership ==
It joined the Unlisted Securities Market in September 1986 From 1982 to 1988 it was known as Eve Construction. It would later be known as Eve Group plc from April 1988, then Eve Group Ltd and Babcock Networks Ltd from 2004. It was bought by the Peterhouse Group plc in January 2000. In the late 1990s the chief executive was Alan Robertson, with finance director Christopher Wigg.

Babcock Networks, its successor, is situated off the M1 at Sherwood Park at Annesley, next to E.ON UK; its training base is at the former RAF Newton in Nottinghamshire.

In March 2003, the former Prince Andrew, Duke of York visited Eve Transcom in Annesley (Sherwood Park) in Nottinghamshire, near junction 27 of the M1.

== Sponsorship ==
From 1982 to 2000, it sponsored the Surrey Championship (cricket), being replaced by Castle Lager.

== Structure ==
It was based at Minster House on Plough Lane in Tooting. It was based south of Summerstown on the B235, north of Haydons Road railway station (on the A218).

=== Divisions ===
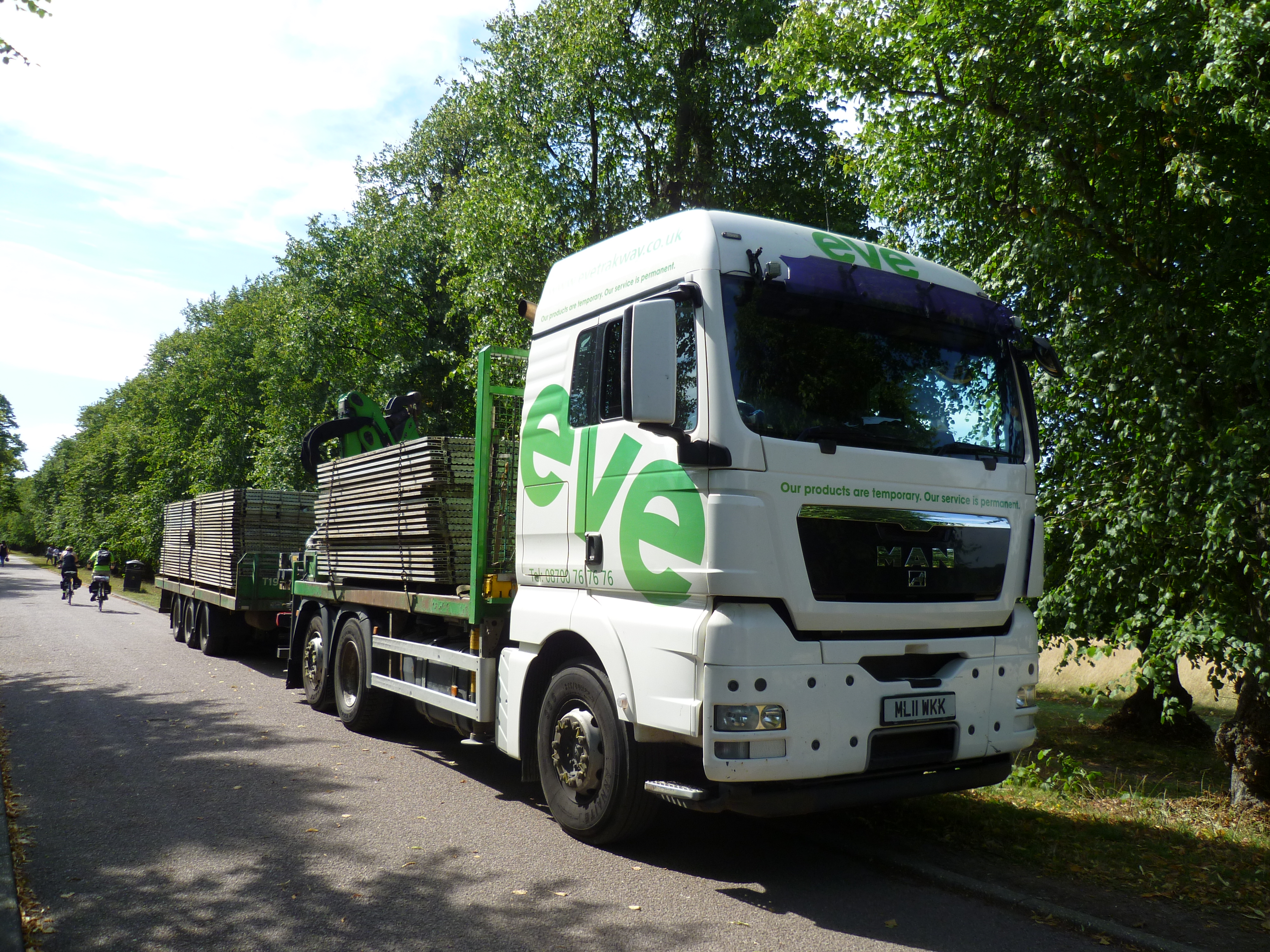
Eve Trakway

Later divisions of Eve Group were:

- Eve Arclive, formed on 18 June 1976 - electrical contracting, later it became Eve Power
- Trakway, later known as Eve Trakway and now known as Live (Trakway) and based in Bramley Vale and Doe Lea in Ault Hucknall near Glapwell in Derbyshire off the A617, east of the Heath Interchange M1 junction 29, and supplies crowd control barriers and temporary fencing. It is owned by Ashtead Group, who trade as A-Plant. In 2002 Eve Trakway built the Super Fortress security fence for the Glastonbury Festival. Eve Construction Trakway was at Lower Heyford, then moved to Sutton-in-Ashfield in the 1970s.
- Eve Telecom

Eve Transcom, comprised

- Eve Transmission - carried out construction and repair of transmission lines for the National Grid
- Eve Cellular - in late 1999, it had built over 7,000 mobile phone base stations throughout the 1990s
- Eve Engineering Design Services
- Eve Structures

== Construction projects ==
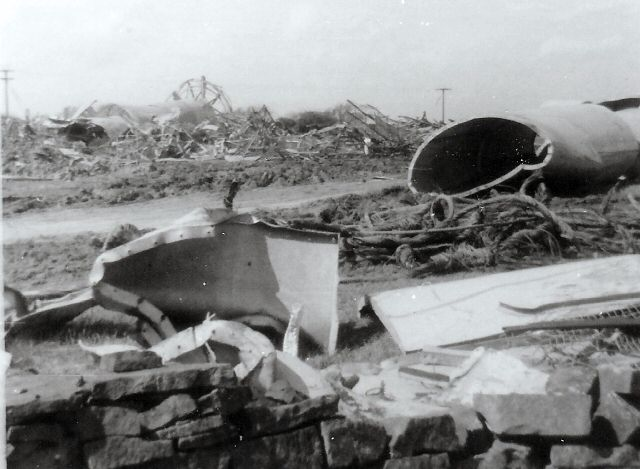
Emley Moor wreckage in March 1969

It built structural steel fabricated buildings or structures.

=== Electrical substations ===
It built many regional electrical substations

- Irthlingborough, Northamptonshire, around 1956
- Shenfield, south-west Essex, around 1960
- Tilbury, Thurrock, around 1960
- Capenhurst, Cheshire, around 1961
- Sundon, Bedfordshire, around 1961
- Three Bridges, West Sussex, part of Crawley, around 1961
- Iver Heath, around 1961
- Ystradowen, south Wales, around 1964
- Walham, north Gloucester, around 1964
- Burwell, east Cambridgeshire near Suffolk border, around 1965
- Broomfield Road, Palmers Green, around 1965
- Hayes, at North Hyde Gardens, around 1967, known for the Hayes substation fire
- Southwick, West Sussex, around 1969
- Bolney, the east of West Sussex, around 1970
- Brockley, South east London, around 1970
- Longford, London, around 1970

=== Transmitters ===
- Angus transmitting station near Forfar, north of Dundee, in October 1965
- Bilsdale transmitting station on the North York Moors
- Divis transmitting station (500 ft), carries television for eastern Northern Ireland in the mid-1950s
- Durris transmitting station; 38-year-old Thomas Sutherland of Blairgowrie died in its construction on 24 October 1966, falling 175 ft from 300 ft up the mast; the company had a regional office in Edinburgh
- The original Emley Moor steel-tube mast, which collapsed on 19 March 1969.; also built the 50-ton 180 ft top steel lattice, on the top of the current structure in December 1970
- Meldrum transmitting station (500 ft) on Core Hill carries national radio in north-east Scotland, in the mid-1950s
- Selkirk transmitting station in 1961/62, which is 925 ft above sea level
- Skelton Transmitting Station, the tallest structure in the UK at 365 metres, and was built in the war for clandestine broadcasts, now a few miles west of the M6, north of Penrith
- Start Point transmitting station on the most southern point of the Devon coast, in the late 1930s
- Stockland Hill transmitting station, in the east of Devon, towards Dorset, for the IBA in 1961 for 405-line b/w television
- Tacolneston transmitting station for the new BBC East services; the site was known for many years first as the Norwich television transmitter
- Woofferton transmitting station, at Woofferton in the south of Shropshire, on the Herefordshire boundary, important in clandestine broadcasts in the Second World War

=== Powerlines ===
- 275kV line from Beauly to Kintore, Aberdeenshire in 1960, for the North of Scotland Hydro-Electric Board
- Llantarnam to Crumlin
- Melksham - Bramley 275kV in 1958
- Poplar - Brimsdown 132kV in 1950
- Berkeley - Gloucester 132kV in 1952
- Penn - Round Oak 132kV in 1956
- Tilbury - Basildon 132 kV in 1957
- Drax - Eggborough - Keadby 400kV in 1968
- Drax - Thornton Junction 400kV in 1969

=== Electricity river crossings ===
- Aust Severn Powerline Crossing (488 ft tall) - the longest powerline crossing in the United Kingdom at 1700 m (5,310 ft) between towers (built around 1955)
- Foyle river crossing, around 1959

== See also ==
- Bierrum, (Danish) builder of Britain's cooling towers
- Powerline river crossings in the United Kingdom
