= Francis Arthur Freeth =

British industrial chemist

Francis Arthur Freeth (2 January 1884 – 15 July 1970) was a British industrial chemist. He spent much of his career at Brunner Mond and its successor Imperial Chemical Industries, as chief chemist, research manager and in a recruiting capacity, with particular knowledge of phase rule chemistry, and developed many processes related to the manufacture of explosives. He made a critical contribution to the British World War I effort by devising new ways to manufacture ammonium nitrate, which was recognised with an honour, and a smaller contribution in World War II for the Special Operations Executive. Freeth created links between Brunner Mond and Dutch chemistry, particularly at the University of Leiden where he met Kammerlingh Onnes and was awarded a doctorate.

== Early life ==
Freeth was born on 2 January 1884 in Birkenhead. His father was a master mariner and was an officer in the Royal Naval Reserve; his great-grandfather, James Freeth, was Quartermaster General between 1851 and 1854, and his grandfather was a major-general as well. He attended Audlem grammar school in Cheshire beginning in 1896; the next year, the County Council built a laboratory at the school, sparking young Freeth's interest in the subject. He excelled at chemistry but had poor mathematical skills. On his second attempt, he passed the matriculation exam to study at Liverpool University from 1900, graduating with first-class honours in 1905 and then a master's degree in 1906. There, he studied under Frederick George Donnan, a physical chemist who would be a great influence on Freeth, who was quickly gaining reputation as a chemist himself.

== Brunner Mond ==
After university, Freeth went to work at a factory belonging to Hitnetts Tobacco, but did not enjoy the work; he quit, and instead joined Brunner Mond on 25 September 1907. On his first day at Brunner Mond, he arrived with a cache of laboratory equipment that he had bought himself on credit.

Freeth became the company's chief chemist in 1909, working at the Winnington Laboratory in Cheshire. In 1909, he was tasked with investigating the manufacture of ammonium nitrate for explosives; needing to read a paper by Franciscus Hubertus Schreinemakers in Dutch, he bought study materials for the language and quickly learned to read it. Freeth corresponded with Dutch chemists, joined the Dutch Chemical Society in 1911 and devoured the Dutch chemical literature in his areas of interest almost entirely by 1914.

=== World War I ===
At the outbreak of World War I, Freeth was in the Territorial Army, having joined in 1912, and spent six weeks in the trenches in France with the Cheshire Regiment as a major in early 1915, but was then sent back to Britain to continue his armaments research at Brunner Mond at the direction of Lord Moulton. Germany, at the start of the war, had an advantage over Britain in their ability to manufacture explosives inexpensively: they had pioneered mixing ammonium nitrate and TNT to create amatol, which was similar to pure TNT in effectiveness, and understood the Haber–Bosch process and applied it in plants to produce the necessary nitrogen compounds.

First, Freeth was charged with finding a way to purify TNT from hot alcoholic solution. Freeth invented a vacuum cooling process; it was, however, very risky, and led to the Silvertown explosion on 19 January 1917, which killed 73 people. Writing in 1962, Freeth said that the process was "very dangerous"; a second, safer, process that he devised was implemented at Gadbrook and produced larger volumes of explosives. The Gadbrook plant almost suffered a similar disaster, but two courageous Brunner Mond employees put out the fire before the plant exploded. Freeth wrote that he would, on a monthly basis, remind the Silvertown plant of the risk that the plant would explode, but that it was deemed "worth the risk".

Second was the investigation of new ways to produce ammonium nitrate. Freeth built upon his pre-war work and implemented two processes he had devised in 1909 at an industrial scale in plants at Lostock Gralam, Sandbach and a specialised factory in Swindon. Together with Herbert Edwin Cocksedge he got a patent on using salt metathesis reaction of sodium nitrate from Chilean saltpeter and ammonium sulfate made from coke gas followed by separating sodium sulfate and ammonium nitrate based on differences in their solubilities at different temperatures.

For his work during the war, he was appointed an OBE in 1924.

=== Dutch connections ===
Following his experience of the war, Freeth became convinced that the British chemical industry must conduct research itself, and he began on a project to recruit researchers, as well as cultivating closer links with academia, and arguing for theoretical underpinning for industrial research. He was also a proponent of a rigorous quantitative approach to chemistry, and used his excellent knowledge of phase rule chemistry to attract talent to Brunner Mond, particularly from prestigious institutions like Oxford.

In 1919, Freeth visited the Netherlands and visited Kammerlingh Onnes' laboratory in Leiden, which was much more elaborate than his own. He maintained contact with Onnes, and also acquainted himself with Hendrik Lorentz, Paul Ehrenfest, Pieter Zeeman, Albert Einstein and his original contact with the country, Schreinemakers. After Onnes' death in 1926, Freeth would write his obituary for Nature.

Directed to investigate the fractionation of coke oven gas, Freeth was inspired by Onnes' low-temperature work; at his instigation, Brunner Mond set up a new low-temperature laboratory in Winnington in 1931 with a number of talented Dutch assistants, where polythene was later discovered. A number of Brunner Mond (and Imperial Chemical Industries) recruits went the other way, to the Netherlands to work with Onnes and increase the fruitful cross-pollination. Freeth was awarded a doctorate of the University of Leiden in 1924—only possible thanks to a special decree of the Dutch Parliament—and joined the Royal Society in 1926 on the recommendation of Donnan and Lord Moulton.

== Imperial Chemical Industries and World War II ==
He stayed with the company after the merger that created Imperial Chemical Industries, despite being replaced as the research manager at Winnington by a non-chemist, Frank Bramwell, in 1927; Freeth was given a higher post in London, becoming Joint Research Manager with William Rintoul, but the change stung and he did not relish the bureaucratic nature of his new role. He retired from his research post in 1938 after a breakdown in 1937, but still did work for the company as a consultant, in addition to secret work for the government.

During World War II, Freeth undertook secret research for the Special Operations Executive, including developing materials for field use or for sabotage by commandos or resistance groups. During this period of activity, he re-connected with friends within ICI and returned to the company as a University Liaison Officer on 1 February 1944, recruiting fresh talent for industrial chemical research. He retired again in 1952, this time to work lightly as a consultant and spend time with his family. Of the second spell at ICI, Freeth said, "These eight years were astonishingly happy and successful".

== Honours ==
- BSc (first class), University of Liverpool, 1905
- MSc, University of Liverpool, 1906
- PhD, University of Leiden, 1924
- Officer of the Order of the British Empire, 1924
- Fellow of the Royal Society, 1926
- honorary lecturer, University College London, 1928–1945
