= St Swithun's Church, Kirklington =

St Swithin's Church, Kirklington
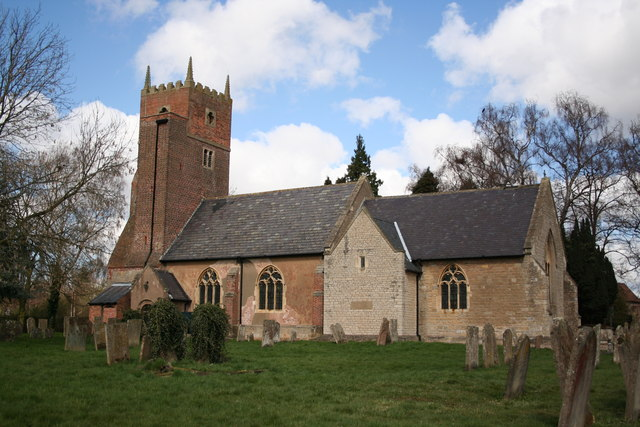
- St Swithin's Church, Kirklington
- St Swithin's Church, Kirklington
- 53°6′37.35″N 0°59′13.61″W
- OS grid reference: SK 67919 57607
- Location: Kirklington, Nottinghamshire
- Country: England
- Denomination: Church of England

History
- Dedication: St Swithin

Architecture
- Heritage designation: Grade II* listed

Administration
- Diocese: Diocese of Southwell and Nottingham
- Archdeaconry: Newark
- Deanery: Newark and Southwell
- Parish: Kirklington with Hockerton

St Swithin's Church, Kirklington, is a Grade II* listed parish church in the Church of England in Kirklington, Nottinghamshire, England.

== History ==
The church dates from the 13th century. It was restored externally between 1873 and 1874 and internally in 1892.

It is in a joint parish with St Nicholas' Church, Hockerton.

== Organ ==
The church contains a small 2 manual pipe organ dating from 1897. A specification of the organ can be found on the National Pipe Organ Register.

== See also ==
- Grade II* listed buildings in Nottinghamshire
- Listed buildings in Kirklington, Nottinghamshire
