= Shell Technology Centre =

Shell research and technology centres

Shell Technology Centre may refer to several research and development facilities operated by Shell:

- Energy Transition Campus Amsterdam, formerly Shell Technology Centre Amsterdam, in Amsterdam, Netherlands
- Shell Technology Center Houston, Shell's technology centre in Houston, Texas.
- Shell Technology Centre Bangalore, a major Shell research and technology hub in Bengaluru, India
- Shell Technology Centre Thornton, a former Shell research centre at Thornton in Cheshire, England, closed by Shell in 2014
