= Castrol Technology Centre =

Chemical Research Centre in South Oxfordshire, United Kingdom

- BP Pangbourne, Pangbourne Technology Centre

- Location within Oxfordshire
- Former names: Bozedown House
- Alternative names: Castrol Global Technology Centre, BP Technology Centre, Castrol Research Laboratories

General information
- Type: Chemical Research Centre
- Location: Whitchurch Hill, Oxfordshire, RG8 7QR
- Coordinates: 51.5°N 1.081°W
- Elevation: 130 m (427 ft)
- Current tenants: 500 staff
- Completed: 1907
- Client: Castrol
- Owner: BP/Castrol Ltd
- Landlord: BP UK

Dimensions
- Other dimensions: 36 acres (14.6 ha)

Technical details
- Floor count: 3

The Castrol Technology Centre is a research institute owned by Castrol in South Oxfordshire, north of Whitchurch-on-Thames.

== History ==
=== Castrol ===
Castrol was founded by C.C.Wakefield in 1899, making lubricants (Wakefield lubricator) for railways.

The research site is based at Bozedown House, a former private residence originally built by William Fanning c.1870 and then rebuilt by Charles Palmer in 1907 after the original house was destroyed by fire. It became a chemical research site in the 1950s and was purchased by Castrol in 1976.

In 1993 it won the Queen's Award for Technological Achievement for its Castrol Marine Cyltech 80. Castrol employs around 7,000 staff worldwide. Castrol was bought by BP in 2000.

== Structure ==
The site is around three-quarters of a mile north of the River Thames, east of the B471, accessed from the A4074 at Woodcote. The site has around 500 staff.

== Function ==
Castrol has twelve research sites around the world. The site at Whitchurch Hill is the largest of the twelve sites. Research is done on rheology and the viscosity of engine oil.

== See also ==
- Former Esso Research Centre in Oxfordshire
- Former Shell Technology Centre Thornton in Cheshire
