= Norman Leslie Falcon =

British geologist (1904–1996)

Norman Leslie Falcon FRGS FRS (29 May 1904 Braunton, Devon, UK – 31 May 1996) was a British geologist, known for his contributions to discoveries of petroleum and natural gas reserves. He was one of the outstanding petroleum geologists during the era from the 1920s to the 1960s when almost all of the oil exploration was done onshore.

== Early life and education ==
Norman Leslie Falcon had a sister and an older brother. Their parents were Thomas Adolphus Falcon, R.B.A., a Cambridge alumnus and landscape painter, and Julie Alice Falcon (née Schwabe), an accomplished pianist. After education from 1914 to 1923 at Exeter School, N. L. Falcon matriculated in 1923 at Trinity College, Cambridge. There he graduated in 1927 with a B.A. in geology and later graduated with an M.A. At Cambridge his mentors were John Edward Marr, W. B. R. King, and Tressilian Charles Nicholas (1887–1989).

== Career ==
Falcon's first geological expeditions abroad involving climbing in the French Alps with Lawrence R. Wager. In 1927 Falcon was appointed geologist to the Edge Island expedition, led by H.G. (Gino) Watkins. In late 1927 Falcon became an employee of the Anglo-Persian Oil Company (APOC). APOC was renamed in 1935 the "Anglo-Iranian Oil Company" (AIOC), which in turn was renamed in 1954 the "British Petroleum Company". Until his retirement in 1965 he remained an employee of the British Petroleum Company and its two predecessor companies, except for his military service from 1940 to 1945. Although he published a number of papers, most of his research is recorded in confidential reports.

Almost immediately on his return from the Edge Island expedition, Falcon departed for Persia and arrived by tanker at Abadan on 1 November 1927. His first assignment was to accompany Y. P. Wilson in mapping the geology (such as anticlines) of the foothills of the Zagros Mountains. Subsequently, Falcon was sent to be the geologist at three oil wells: one on Qeshm Island, one near Aghajari, and one near Dogonbadan in Gachsaran County. In 1930, APOC's management decided upon a project to completely map the Zagros Mountains at a scale of 4 miles to the inch (about 2.5 km to 1 cm). Falcon joined the project, which was led by John Vernon Harrison. The two geologists worked together from 1930 to 1937 for nearly eight years — performing fieldwork in difficult mountainous terrain and ultimately mapping, both geologically and topographically, nearly 90000 square miles (roughly 233000 square km) of country. A topographical surveying team, led by W. E. Browne, worked ahead of the geologists to provide a trigonometric base-map, providing a basis for the topographical base-map with geological information. In the territory mapped, much of the tribal country of the Bakhtiari people and Qashqai people in Khuzestan province and Fars province was seen by Westerners for the first time during the mapping project. The project identified the Zagros fold and thrust belt and provided an excellent basis for subsequent refinements.

Upon his return to the UK in 1937, Falcon was assigned by George Martin Lees, AIOC's Chief Geologist, to a team created to explore for onshore oil in the UK. On the 27th of January 1938 in Hastings, Sussex, Norman L. Falcon married Dorothy Muriel Freeman. They had a son born in 1939, another son born in 1941, and a daughter born in 1945.

In early 1938 Norman L. Falcon was assigned to a well-site at Cousland in Midlothian, Scotland. Later in 1938, AIOC reassigned him to work on Iranian geology by using aerial photography and he learnt to pilot small airplanes. In 1939 he was seconded to Shell plc to work in The Hague for further training and assisting in the development of aerial mapping in Iran. The outbreak of WW II found him still in secondment to Shell plc in The Hague. In May 1940 he boarded one of the last ships to leave the Netherlands for the UK before the invasion by the German army. In 1940 Norman and Dorothy Falcon bought a house in Woking. In the summer of 1940 he became a commissioned British Army officer in the Aerial Photography Intelligence Service (APIS) working with the Royal Air Force Intelligence Branch. By the end of WW II he had been promoted to Lieutenant Colonel and commanded the Joint Services Aerial Photographic Intelligence Service. From 1946 to 1950 he was a reservist holding the rank of Major in the Royal Engineers and worked part-time on geology related to military concerns.

In late 1945, Falcon returned to the AIOC offices in London and resumed his development of an exploration programme for the UK. This post-war programme provided data on the subsurface geology of the British Isles — the data became enormously valuable for oil exploration of the North Sea. The programme work led to a better understanding of British stratigraphy, particularly of the Coal Measures Group belonging to the Upper Carboniferous strata in the Midlands. From 1945 to 1951 Falcon remained well-informed on developments in Iran and worked on compilation studies, especially one study involving Iranian petroleum seeps. In 1946 Kuwait became a major new area of importance in oil exploration. Falcon became involved in developing the oil industry in Iraq, the Trucial States, Oman, and the Eastern Aden Protectorate.

During the Abadan Crisis from 1951 to 1954, Iran seized control of AIOC's Iranian assets. Thus, AIOC lost its main source of crude oil and AIOC's management led the company's worldwide search for other reserves of petroleum and natural gas. In 1953 Falcon was appointed AIOC's Geological Manager, directly assisting G. M. Lees in corporate matters of oil exploration. In 1954 AIOC was renamed the British Petroleum Company. Falcon initiated a review of the world's major sedimentary basins and at the company's London office established a geological library and information service available to the company's overseas offices. He recruited specialists in various technical specialities, such as photogeology, to work at the Sunbury Research Centre. He was instrumental in commissioning Jacques Cousteau and the Calypso for underwater geological mapping in the Persian Gulf. The techniques pioneered on the Calypso led to geological mapping of the sea floor south of the Dorset coastline and in 1961 to the drilling of the UK's first offshore oil well. The oil well was located on an anticline in Lyme Bay.

In 1955, upon the death of G. M. Lees, Norman Falcon was promoted to Chief Geologist of the British Petroleum Company. In 1955 the British Petroleum Company returned to Iran but held only a 40% equity in the consortium that replaced AIOC's Iranian monopoly. Falcon greatly expanded the British Petroleum Company's worldwide exploration interests and retained the company's strong links with Iran and other countries in the Middle East. By 1965, when Falcon retired, the British Petroleum Company held the rights to slightly more than 20% of worldwide oil reserves outside Soviet Russia. During his decade-long stewardship, the company found major new reserves in Abu Dhabi, Dubai, Qatar, Libya, Nigeria, as well as Iran. The end of his career occurred during the transition from the predominance of onshore oil exploration to the predominance of offshore oil exploration.

== Later life ==
In retirement, Falcon remained, from 1965 to 1972, an advisor to the British Petroleum Company. For some time he was an advisor to the London Stock Exchange. He served on various committees sponsored by the British government. However, most of his committee work was for the Royal Society, which elected him a Fellow in 1960, and for the Royal Geographical Society (RGS), which elected him a Fellow in 1927 and an Honorary Fellow in 1988. Falcon was the organizer and leader of the RGS's Musandam expedition in 1971–1972.

He became in 1930 a member of the British Association (BA) and in 1967 served as President of Section C Geology at the BA's meeting in Leeds. His presidential address to the BA's Section C provided a valuable summary of Arabian Plate geology related to the Tethyan Trench.

In 1960, the Falcon family moved to a large Edwardian house with a 4.5 acre (about 1.8 hectare) garden in Chiddingfold, Borough of Waverley, Sussex. There Norman and Dorothy Falcon lived in retirement, and he enjoyed gardening and woodworking. At the house they had a solar panel installed on the roof along with a heat exchanger. The couple supported Guildford's Yvonne Arnaud Theatre. Upon his death he was survived by his widow, three children, and four grandchildren. As a posthumous honour, the European Association of Geoscientists and Engineers (EAGE) created the Norman Falcon Award for the best paper, in the preceding calendar year, published in the journal Petroleum Geoscience.

== Awards and honours ==
In 1945, the U.S. government awarded him the Bronze Star Medal for his military intelligence service. The Geological Society of London awarded him in 1952 the Murchison Fund and in 1963 the Murchison Medal. In 1973 he was awarded the Royal Geographical Society's Founder's Medal and was elected an Honorary Member of the American Association of Petroleum Engineers.

== Selected publications ==
- Harrison, J. V.; Falcon, N. L. (1934). "Collapse Structures". Geological Magazine. 71 (12): 529–539. Bibcode:1934GeoM...71..529H. doi:10.1017/S0016756800095005. S2CID 248535236.
- Harrison, John Vernon; Falcon, Norman Leslie (1936). "Gravity Collapse Structures and Mountain Ranges, as exemplified in South-Western Iran". Quarterly Journal of the Geological Society. 92 (1–4): 91–102. doi:10.1144/GSL.JGS.1936.092.01-04.06. S2CID 129219505.
- Harrison, J. V.; Falcon, N. L. (1938). "An Ancient Landslip at Saidmarreh in Southwestern Iran". The Journal of Geology. 46 (3, Part 1): 296–309. Bibcode:1938JG.....46..296H. doi:10.1086/624654. S2CID 129850006.
- Falcon, N. L. (1947). "Major Clues in the Tectonic History of the Malverns". Geological Magazine. 84 (4): 229–240. Bibcode:1947GeoM...84..229F. doi:10.1017/S0016756800082674. S2CID 129818740.
- Falcon, Norman Leslie; Tarrant, Leslie Hamilton (1950). "The gravitational and magnetic exploration of parts of the Mesozoic-covered areas of south-central England". Quarterly Journal of the Geological Society. 106 (1–4): 141–170. doi:10.1144/GSL.JGS.1950.106.01-04.12. S2CID 131531066.
- Lees, G. M.; Falcon, N. L. (1952). "The Geographical History of the Mesopotamian Plains". The Geographical Journal. 118 (1): 24–39. doi:10.2307/1791234. JSTOR 1791234.
- Falcon, N. L. (1958). "Position of Oil Fields of Southwest Iran with Respect to Relevant Sedimentary Basins: Middle East". 125: 1279–1293.
- Falcon, Norman Leslie (1961). "Major Earth-Flexuring in the Zagros Mountains of South-West Iran". Quarterly Journal of the Geological Society. 117 (1–4): 367–376. doi:10.1144/gsjgs.117.1.0367. S2CID 140167642. 1961
- Falcon, N. L. (1969). "Problems of the relationship between surface structure and deep displacements illustrated by the Zagros Range". Geological Society, London, Special Publications. 3 (1): 9–21. Bibcode:1969GSLSP...3....9F. doi:10.1144/GSL.SP.1969.003.01.02. S2CID 129586464.
- Falcon, Norman Leslie (1970). "A discussion on the structure and evolution of the Red Sea and the nature of the Red Sea, Gulf of Aden and Ethiopia rift junction - Introductory remarks". Philosophical Transactions of the Royal Society of London. Series A, Mathematical and Physical Sciences. 267 (1181): 5–7. doi:10.1098/rsta.1970.0018. S2CID 135185825.
- Falcon, N. L. (1973). "The Musandam (Northern Oman) Expedition 1971/1972". The Geographical Journal. 139 (1): 1–19. doi:10.2307/1795788. JSTOR 1795788.
- Falcon, Norman Leslie (1974). "Southern Iran: Zagros Mountains". Geological Society, London, Special Publications. 4 (1): 199–211. Bibcode:1974GSLSP...4..199F. doi:10.1144/GSL.SP.2005.004.01.11. S2CID 128486367.
