= Hayes substation fire =

2025 fire in London, England

Coordinates: 51.499676°N 0.411293°W

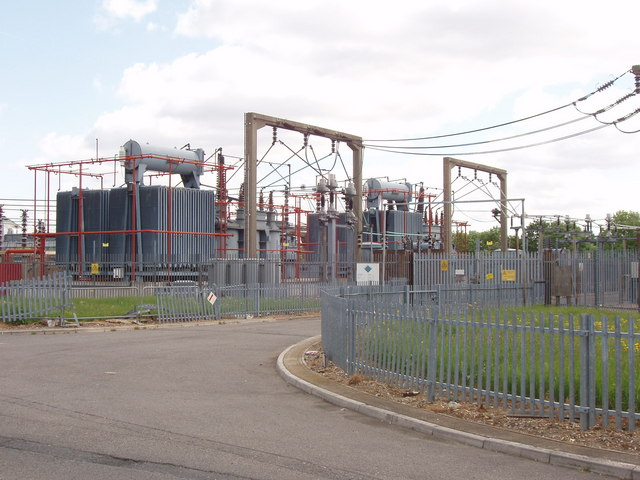
Electricity sub-station at Hayes on North Hyde Gardens before the fire. The transformer shown on the right was destroyed by the fire

On the evening of 20 March 2025, a fire began at an electrical substation in Hayes, Hillingdon, London, leading to the closure of Heathrow Airport. The fire cut electricity supply to the airport which was not able to operate using back-up systems. Closure of the airport for around 16 hours led to more than 1,000 flights to and from the airport being cancelled and disrupted travel for around 200,000 passengers.

== Background ==
The 275kV substation was built by J. L. Eve Construction at North Hyde Gardens around 1967. Around the same time, an underground 275kV line was built to Iver Heath substation in Buckinghamshire. The North Hyde site is part of the UK's National Grid. It is close to Heathrow Airport but outside its perimeter, and supplies a nearby 66kV substation operated by SSEN.

== Fire ==
On 20 March 2025, at 23:23 GMT, emergency services were called to a fire at North Hyde electrical substation in Nestles Avenue, Hayes, Hillingdon. Ten fire engines and 70 firefighters were dispatched as a 650-foot cordon was established. London Fire Brigade reported that one transformer within the substation was alight. By 04:00, half of a transformer remained on fire, and the fire brigade had the fire under control by around 06:30. Firefighting was delayed by the need to first turn off power to the site.

Energy Secretary Ed Miliband told reporters that this was a 'catastrophic fire', which was 'unusual and unprecedented' and had also affected a backup generator. At 13:00 on 21 March, the fire continued to burn at a reduced level, fuelled by 25,000 litres of cooling oil which had been contained within the burning transformer.

== Impact ==
=== Heathrow Airport ===
About 90 minutes after the power outage began, Heathrow Airport closed, forcing 120 flights to be diverted to Gatwick Airport, Charles de Gaulle Airport in France, Shannon Airport in Ireland, and Goose Bay Airport in Canada. Flightradar24 stated that at least 1,351 flights were affected. Cirium, an airplane analytics firm, estimated that 290,000 passengers would be affected. 1,300 flights were expected to be affected, assuming the airport could reopen at midnight the same day. Flights could not be diverted to other British airports due to a lack of capacity, with Heathrow being Britain's largest airport and an international hub.

It was initially announced that Heathrow would be closed until 23:59 on the 21st, but landings for repositioning purposes were allowed from 16:00 and eight scheduled flights departed that evening. Normal operations resumed on the 22nd (a Saturday).

Heathrow management understood that they had a resilient power supply since the airport took power from three substations (North Hyde, Iver Heath, and another), and each substation had more than one transformer and was connected to the airport by more than one cable. In the event, the extent of damage at North Hyde and the need to isolate that site for firefighting meant that around a third of the airport lost supply. The affected area included Terminal 2, Terminal 4 and the road tunnel leading to the central area, which is the main route for passengers to access Terminal 3. It was possible to reconfigure the supply within the airport but the entire process for this – powering down, switching 33kV connections, powering up and testing systems – took up to 12 hours.

The airport has some backup power supplies but these are inadequate to run the whole airport. Only two UK airports – Heathrow and Gatwick – have any regulation concerning their resilience to disruption, but an October 2023 a report by the National Infrastructure Commission recommended that the government should set standards for resilience at important infrastructure sites including airports. Other important sites such as data centres, which use similar amounts of power to the airport, typically have two grid sources of power plus generators and battery backup sufficient to ensure uninterrupted operation.

Heathrow is also an important cargo airport, carrying £190bn of goods per year, 48% of UK air cargo.

On 2 April, the shutdown of Heathrow Airport was the subject of a meeting of the House of Commons Transport Select Committee. Appearing before the committee, Nigel Wicking, chief executive of Heathrow Airline Operators' Committee, a group representing airlines, said that he had raised concerns with Heathrow about the "resilience" of its power supply on two occasions in the week preceding the closure. Thomas Woldbye, Heathrow's chief executive, described the closure as an "unlikely event" that required "very serious safety decisions".

=== Other transport ===
The fire was close to the Great Western Main Line, near Hayes & Harlington station, and disrupted Heathrow Express services and portions of the Elizabeth line. Trains and London Underground services to Heathrow were suspended or disrupted. The M4 motorway was closed for a time between junctions 3 and 4, while local roads were also closed, affecting bus routes.

=== Evacuations and outages ===
At least 150 people were evacuated, and at least 16,300 homes lost power. National Grid reported at 06:00 on 21 March that they had restored power to 62,000 customers, but 4,900 homes remained without power.

== Investigations ==
The preliminary National Energy System Operator (NESO) investigation report in May 2025 ruled out suspicious activity as the cause, but did not identify the root cause of the fire. The team had investigated 600 items of evidence relating to the 57-year-old substation.

Heathrow airport held an internal investigation into resilience, led by Ruth Kelly, former government minister and airport board member. Its 75-page report was published in May 2025 and stated that in the circumstances, shutting down the airport was the correct decision to ensure safety.

In July 2025, NESO reported that National Grid had become aware of a fault in July 2018, but that it had not been repaired. Excess moisture levels were found in substation components, for which bushings should have been replaced. NESO also found that the fire suppression system at the site had been inoperable since at least 2022, and that National Grid was not aware that the loss of one of Heathrow's three supplies would cause outages of the airport's critical systems. Ofgem announced that it would be investigating National Grid's maintenance of its infrastructure.

== Similar incidents ==
- On Friday 16 June 1989, Gatwick Airport had no electricity for two hours after a transformer blew up after a power failure; the back-up system did not work.
