= Bramley Vale =

Village in Derbyshire, England

Coordinates: 53.1908299°N 1.3051176°W

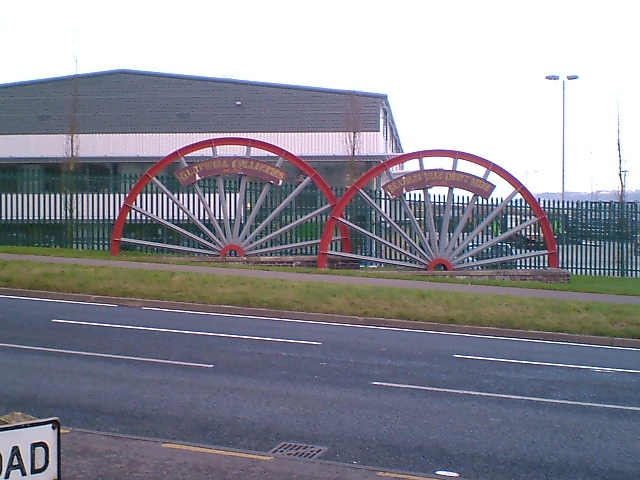
- Bramley Vale

- Location within Derbyshire
- OS grid reference: SK4666
- Civil parish: Ault Hucknall
- District: Bolsover
- Shire county: Derbyshire
- Region: East Midlands
- Country: England
- Sovereign state: United Kingdom
- Post town: Chesterfield
- Postcode district: S44
- Dialling code: 01246
- Police: Derbyshire
- Fire: Derbyshire
- Ambulance: East Midlands
- UK Parliament: Bolsover

Bramley Vale is a village in Derbyshire, England, south of Bolsover. It is in the civil parish of Ault Hucknall.

== History ==
Bramley Vale is a former colliery village and has a lengthy mining heritage, from the opening of the Glapwell colliery in 1882 till it closed in 1974 with all the men being transferred to other local collieries.

== Geography ==
The village is four miles south of Bolsover, close to junction 29 of the M1 motorway, and has good transport links to Chesterfield, Mansfield, and Nottingham by Pronto bus, operated by stagecoach Yorkshire. The A617 road runs through the village.

== Amenities ==
It has one local shop which has a free ATM.

== Companies ==
Companies based in Bramley Vale include:-

1. Eve Trakway who specialise in temporary access systems and related services from trackway systems, barriers, fencing and traffic management to security with headquarters in Bramley Vale; the company was a former division of J. L. Eve Construction.
2. Coverworld, producers and suppliers of single and twin skin coated steel cladding systems.
