= John Boddam-Whetham =

English naturalist, traveler, and cricketer

Personal information
- Full name: John Whetham Boddam-Whetham
- Born: 25 May 1843; Kirklington, Nottinghamshire, England
- Died: 23 March 1918 (aged 74); Folkestone, Kent, England
- Batting: Unknown
- Bowling: Unknown

Career statistics
Competition	First-class
Matches	1
Runs scored	12
Batting average	6.00
100s/50s	–/–
Top score	7
Balls bowled	8
Wickets	0
Bowling average	–
5 wickets in innings	–
10 wickets in match	–
Best bowling	–
Catches/stumpings	–/–
- Source: Cricinfo, 28 September 2019

John Whetham Boddam-Whetham (25 May 1843 – 23 March 1918) was an English naturalist, traveler and first-class cricketer.

== Cricketer ==
The son of Colonel Alexander Boddam-Whetham and his wife, Maria, Boddam-Whetham was born at Kirklington Hall in May 1843. He was educated at Eton College, though he did not represent the college XI in cricket. He did however make a single appearance in first-class cricket for the Gentlemen of the North against the Gentlemen of the South at Beeston in 1870. Batting twice in the match, he was dismissed for seven runs in the Gentlemen of the North first-innings by W. G. Grace, while in their second-innings he was dismissed by his brother, Fred Grace, for five runs.

== Travels ==
During the 1870s he became a well known naturalist and traveller. He toured the western United States in the early 1870s, which included an ascent of Mount Shasta. From there he departed for Australia, and from Sydney he took a boat to Honolulu, arriving in July 1874. During his tour of the Hawaiian Islands, he attempted unsuccessfully to recover a specimen of Moho nobilis for the British Museum, a now extinct bird which was endemic to the islands. After travelling to Fiji and Samoa, he returned to Hawaii and was this time successful in recovering a pair of the birds. While travelling through Central America in 1875, Boddam-Wetham purchased two fragments from a carved wooden lintel in Flores, El Petén. Now in the British Museum, they are known to be from Lintel 3 of Temple I at Tikal. He returned to London in 1876, but left for a tour of Central and South America in later 1877 and arrived in British Guiana in January 1878, where he was to set out to climb Mount Roraima. He joined a colonial government led exhibition to reach the summit of the mountain, but after a long trek through the rainforest they were unsuccessful. He continued his travels around Central America, returning to London in 1879. Boddam-Whetham published several accounts of his travels.

== Later life ==
Following his travels in the 1870s, little is known of his later life, besides his marriage to Harriet Manning in November 1882 at North Shore, Sydney. He died at Folkestone in March 1918.

== Bibliography ==
- Tikal Report No 6 - Latin American Studies, THE CARVED WOODEN LINTELS OF TIKAL, William R. Coe and Edwin M. Shook, Appendix by Linton Satterthwaite
