= Hockerton Housing Project =

Community of earth sheltered homes in England

Coordinates: 53.0974°N 0.9295°W

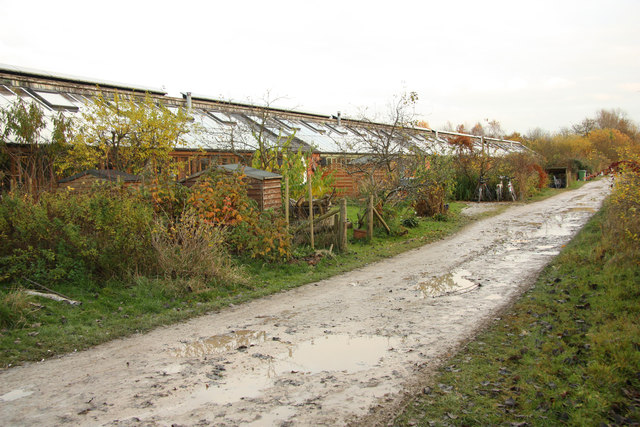
Hockerton Housing Project

The Hockerton Housing Project is a small community of five earth sheltered homes on the outskirts of Hockerton, Nottinghamshire, UK.

The houses were designed by ‘green’ architects Professor Brenda Vale and Dr Robert Vale. Low carbon living is facilitated through the use of renewable energy, the water system, food grown on site, and the community's approach to work and transport.

The homes were completed in September 1998 after three years of planning and 18 months of construction, at a cost of about £65,000. Two homes have since changed ownership on the open property market.

== Layout ==
The development consists of a terrace of five single story dwellings which are earth-sheltered at the rear (North), so that the ground surface slopes and blends smoothly into the field at the back. The houses have passive solar heating (a combination of high thermal mass and the south-facing conservatory) removing the need for a space heating system and the greatest factor in lowering energy use.

Each house is 6 metres deep with a 19 metre conservatory to the south. This runs the full width of each dwelling. A repeated modular bay system of 3.2m in width was used for ease and cost of construction. Most of the internal rooms have 3 metre high French windows linking them to the conservatory. Those rooms that are not so dependent on natural light, such as utility and bathing areas are located towards the rear of the homes.

The surrounding 40,000 square metre site allows for crop cultivation, the rearing of sheep and chickens, and self-sufficiency in water and energy.

== Energy generation and use ==
Two wind turbines and a solar photovoltaic system provide most of the energy required to run the homes. All systems are grid linked, which allows for both import of energy during periods of supply shortfall, and export for periods of excess energy production. The excess exported offsets the imported energy from the grid.

• 6 kW proven wind turbine installed early 2002 year (upgraded in 2008)
• 7.65 kW peak array of photovoltaics (solar electric) installed August 2002 complementing wind power.
• 5 kW Iskra wind turbine installed in 2005 – installed as part of construction of a community building

The typical energy use for the house is about 10kWhrs/day (all electric). This is about 10% of a typical UK home. The majority of the electricity use is generated by the on-site renewables which has reduced energy bills to about £100/annum. This is offset by income from Renewables Obligation certificates, and may in future benefit from feed-in tariffs.

== Water capture, use and processing ==
There are two water capture and treatment systems.

Non-drinking water: Rainfall on the fields is channeled to a sump from where it is pumped to a reservoir to the north of the buildings. This reservoir holds enough water for 250 days. The water is sand filtered and treated with chlorine before entering the homes.

Drinking or potable water: Drinking water is captured from the conservatory roofs in copper pipes, which are slightly antiseptic, and stored in a tank that holds at least 100 days worth of drinking water. The water is passed through 3 filters before it enters the homes: a five-micrometre string filter, a carbon filter and then a UV-light filter which kills bacteria and viruses.

Water use is reduced through low-flush toilets and flow-restrictors on shower heads. Detergent free laundry balls keep the water unpolluted.

Processing waste water: A reed bed sewage system is in place to process waste water. Solid waste is captured in a septic tank. This is emptied each quarter and waste is composted on-site. Liquid waste then takes 100 days to pass through the reed-bed, with the reeds roots breaking down the liquid effluent.

== Co-operation and community ==
All residents own their homes but are also members of a co-operative. Each home, as part of the lease, undertakes to spend 300 unpaid hours per year on managing and maintaining the site, from the infrastructure of the energy and water systems through to lambing and growing food; and 300 paid hours per year supporting the joint business which runs tours and educational events, hosts away-days and consulting on both new and retrofit energy efficient building.
