= Eve Trakway =

Supplier of temporary access systems

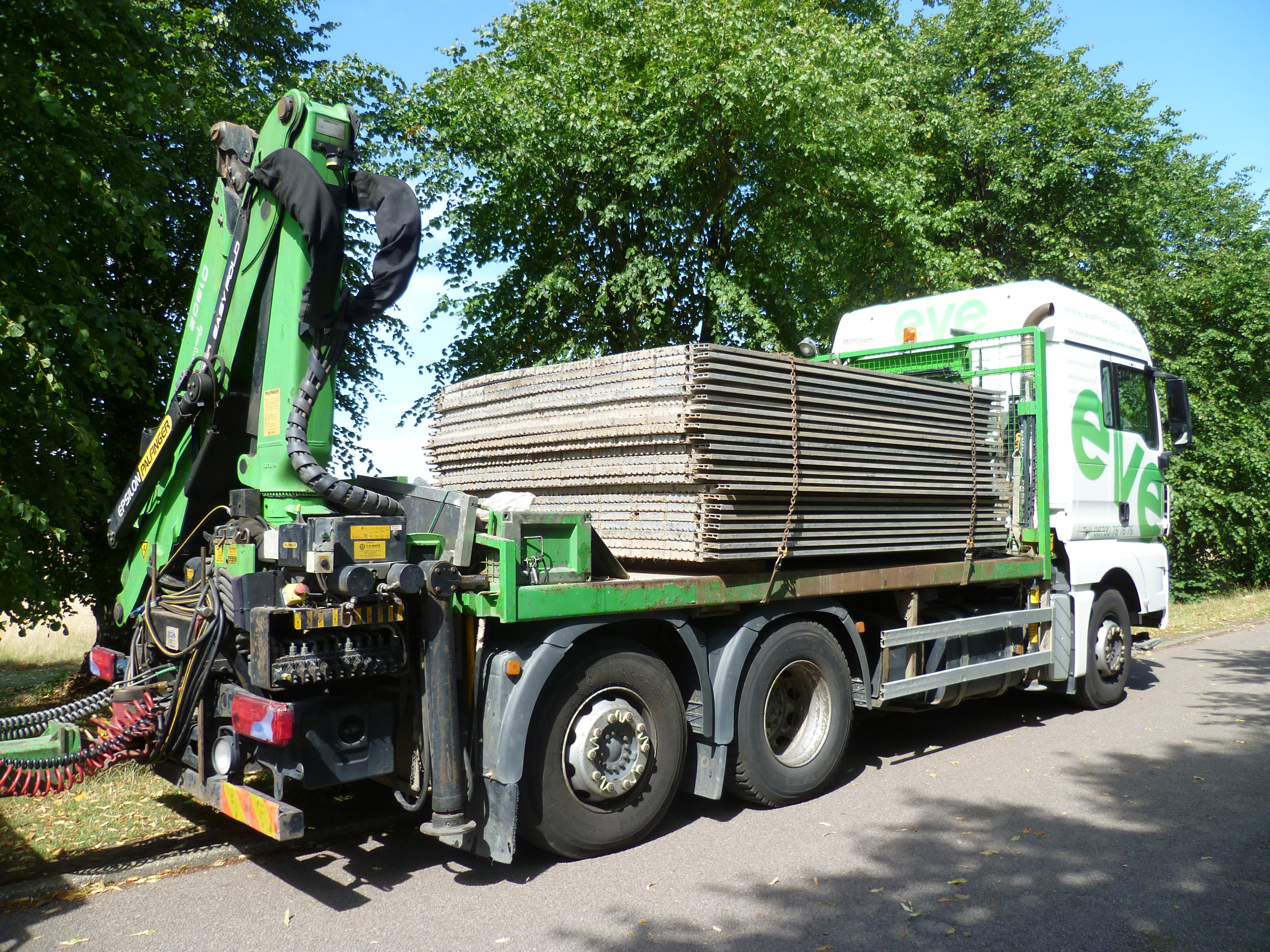
The company's products loaded after an outdoor event at Trent Park, London.

Eve Trakway are a supplier of temporary access systems. The firm is the principal trading subsidiary of Accession Group Limited, which in 2013 was acquired by Ashtead Group plc for cash of £28 million, and a £7 million earnout.

== History ==
Eve Trakway originates from a division of J. L. Eve Construction, which built the wartime Chain Home radar transmitter masts.

== Structure ==
It is based at Bramley Vale near Ault Hucknall, off the A617 in eastern Derbyshire.

== Products ==
The firm provide temporary roads, bridges, footpaths, and crowd control barriers for use in transport and construction projects and outdoor events.
