= Bretherick's Handbook of Reactive Chemical Hazards =

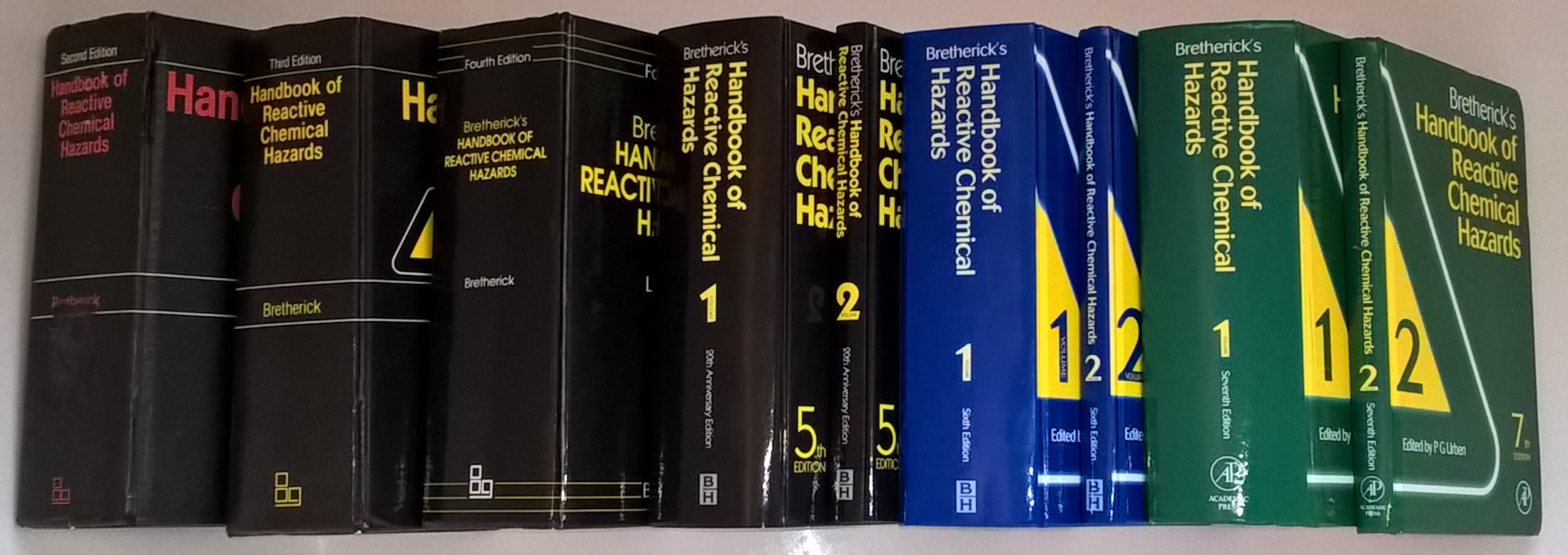
2nd to 7th editions

Bretherick's Handbook of Reactive Chemical Hazards is a well-established source of information on chemical safety, often known by its author's name, and often cited in the chemical and chemical engineering literature. In recent editions it has been in two volumes, volume 1 being individual compounds and hazardous reactions, volume 2 being groups and other information relevant to reactive chemical hazards, arranged by topic.

== History ==
In 1964, research chemist Leslie Bretherick read of a violent explosion in a laboratory, and knew that the same journal had reported a similar incident with the same chemicals 16 years earlier. Realising that there was no central source of literature on dangerous chemical reactions, he set out to create one, combing through the literature in his spare time. In 1971 his employers (BP) allowed him to do this in half his work time and a book was published in 1975 entitled Handbook of Reactive Chemical Hazards. The work involved creating what was effectively a database on paper of substances and literature references, arranged by empirical formula, and converting this into a book. This was well received as “an invaluable reference work” One reviewer wrote ““Bretherick” (the name under which this book must surely become known)”. A revised second edition followed in 1979, with a reviewer stating “that “Bretherick” is an essential first reference” As well as corrections and additional reactions, this contained a new section dealing with groups of compounds and some other matters. A third edition followed in 1985, Bretherick having retired in 1982 in order to work full-time on the project. In the preface to the 4th edition (1989) he announced that his eyesight was failing. As a result, he did not contribute new material to further editions, which was done by others. The 5th edition (1995) was edited by Peter G. Urben and as the book was larger, was split into two volumes. Leslie Bretherick died in April 2003 The 6th edition (1999), the 7th edition (2007) and the 8th edition (2017) were also edited by Urben.

== Electronic versions ==
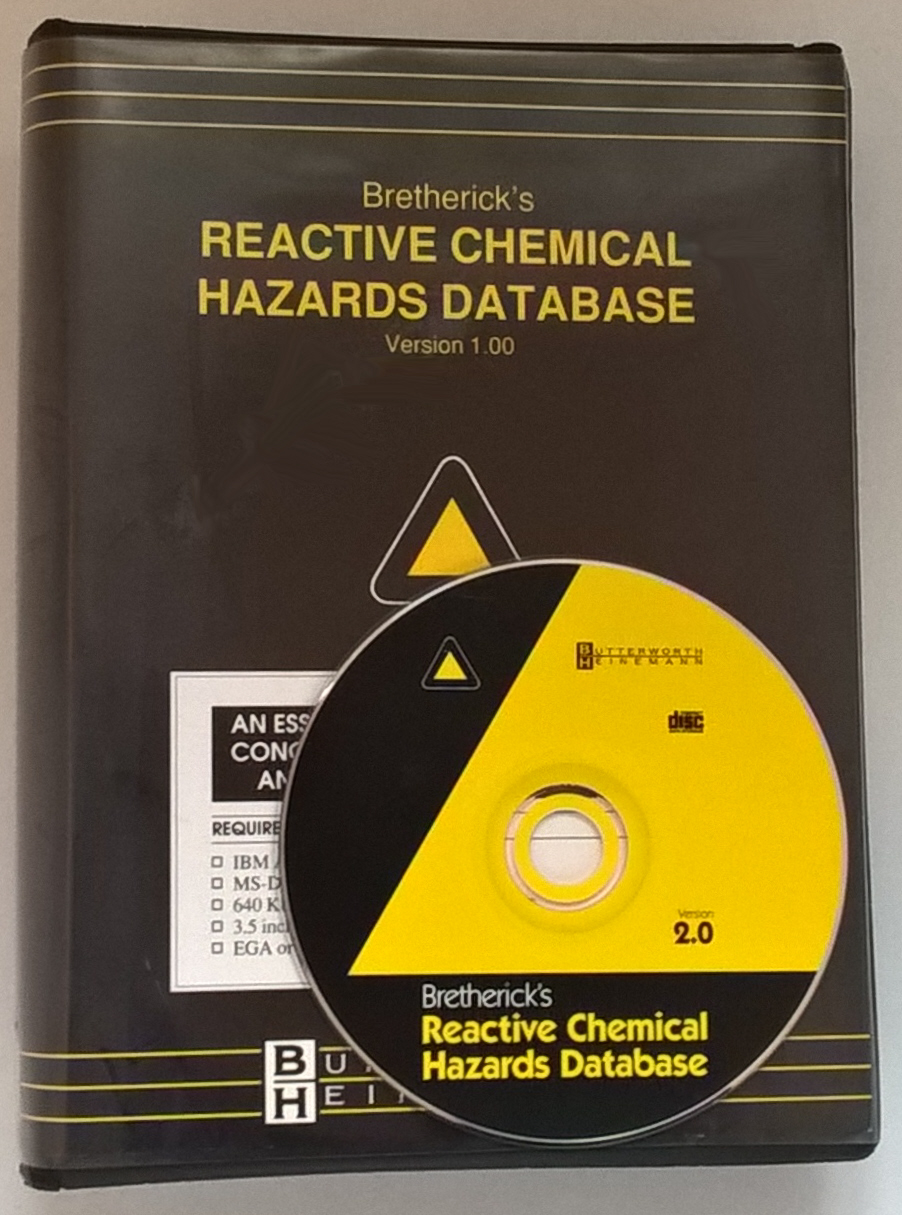
Database 1.0 and 2.0

A version of the 4th edition was also made available on floppy disks in the form of a database, allowing searches for hazard by class or topic and also partial name. Subsequent editions were supported by an equivalent on CD-ROM. The difficulties of converting the book into a database have been described.
