= Listed buildings in Kirklington, Nottinghamshire =

Kirklington is a civil parish in the Newark and Sherwood district of Nottinghamshire, England. The parish contains 13 listed buildings that are recorded in the National Heritage List for England. Of these, one is listed at Grade II*, the middle of the three grades, and the others are at Grade II, the lowest grade. The parish contains the village of Kirklington and the surrounding countryside. All the listed buildings are in the village, and consist of houses, cottages, farmhouses and farm buildings, a church, a school, a village hall, a water mill and an adjoining road bridge, and a telephone kiosk.

== Key ==
Grade	Criteria
II*	Particularly important buildings of more than special interest
II	Buildings of national importance and special interest

== Buildings ==
Name and location	Photograph	Date	Notes	Grade
St Swithun's Church; 53.11139°N 0.98674°W		12th century	The church has been altered and extended through the centuries, the tower dates from the 17th century, and the church was restored and partly rebuilt in 1873–74 by Ewan Christian. It is built in stone and red brick, it is partly rendered, and has slate roofs. The church consists of a nave, a south porch, a chancel, a south vestry and a west tower. The tower is mainly in brick, on a chamfered plinth, with two stages, a band, a single diagonal buttress, and an embattled parapet with corner crocketed pinnacles. On the south side is a lean-to, and a large stair turret with a sundial, and on the north side is a clock face. The 13th-century porch is gabled, and contains an arched entrance with a hood mould, and the inner doorway dates from the 12th century.	II*
Highfield Farmhouse; 53.11068°N 0.99124°W		Late 17th or early 18th century	The farmhouse is in red brick with blue brick diapering, floor bands, dentilled and dogtooth bands, and a pantile roof with brick coped gables and kneelers. There are two storeys and attics, and an L-shaped plan, with a main range of two bays, and a rear wing. The windows are casements under segmental arches.	II
Linthwaite Cottage; 53.11161°N 0.98884°W		Early 18th century	A house in red brick, with a floor band, dogtooth eaves and a pantile roof. There are two storeys and five bays. On the front is a gabled porch, and most of the windows are horizontally-sliding sashes, some with segmental heads.	II
The Old Farmhouse; 53.11207°N 0.98954°W	—	Mid 18th century	The farmhouse is in rendered red brick, and has a pantile roof with tile coped gables. There are two storeys and attics, a front range of three bays, and two two-storey two-bay rear wings. In the centre is a doorway, over which are casement windows, and the other windows are horizontally-sliding sashes; all the openings are under segmental arches.	II
Barn, The Old Farm; 53.11212°N 0.99001°W	—	Mid 18th century	The barn is in red brick, and has a pantile roof with brick coped gables and kneelers. It contains a large doorway with sliding doors.	II
Greet Farmhouse; 53.11165°N 0.98226°W		Late 18th century	The farmhouse is in rendered red brick and some stone, with a raised eaves band, and a pantile roof with stone coped gables and kneelers. There are two storeys and three bays, and rear extensions. In the centre is a doorway with a fanlight, and the windows are sashes.	II
Ivy Farmhouse and cottage 53.11216°N 0.98910°W		Late 18th century	The farmhouse and cottage are in red brick, with dogtooth eaves and pantile roofs. There are three storeys and four bays, and to the right is a two-storey two-bay extension. The doorway has a traceried fanlight, and the windows are sashes, some horizontally-sliding, and some with segmental heads.	II
Mill Farmhouse; 53.10878°N 0.99340°W		Late 18th century	The farmhouse is in red brick with dogtooth eaves and a tile roof. There are two storeys, a double-depth plan, and a symmetrical front of three bays. In the centre is a gabled porch, the doorway has a fanlight, and the windows are sashes under segmental arches.	II
The Rodney School; 53.11477°N 0.98149°W		1779	A house, later a school, that was greatly extended and remodelled in 1904. It is in rendered red brick with some stone, on a plinth, with floor bands, parapets, and a hipped slate roof. The main block has two storeys and attics, and five bays, the outer bays slightly recessed. In the centre is a porte cochère with an arched entrance, decorative spandrels and Ionic pilasters, over which is a frieze, a tripartite casement window flanked by dated lozenges, and fluted piers carrying a parapet with open carving. It has an architrave with orbs on the angles, and the windows are casements. The main block is flanked by two-storey wings, and there is a mock three-storey turret with a conical roof.	II
The Rodney School Lodge; 53.11180°N 0.98585°W	—	Early 19th century	The lodge at the entrance to the grounds of the school is in painted brick with a hipped slate roof. There are two storeys and two bays. On the front is a gabled porch with plain bargeboards and a flat-arched entrance. There are two bow windows, and the other windows are casements.	II
The Old School; 53.11156°N 0.98563°W		1840	The school, later a village hall and a house, is in stuccoed red brick with a slate roof. The central part has a single storey and three bays, and is flanked by two-storey projecting wings, each with a pedimented gable and a roundel in the tympanum. On the front is a projecting gabled porch with two sash windows on the front, doors on the sides, and a re-set dated plaque in the gable. The other windows are cross-casements.	II
Kirklington Mill and road bridge 53.10853°N 0.99277°W		Mid 19th century	The water mill straddles the River Greet. It is in red brick with some blue brick, on a plinth, with a raised eaves band and a tile roof. There are three storeys and a loft, and three bays. On the front are doorways and windows, all with blue brick segmental arches and keystones. In the centre, breaking through the eaves, is a gabled hoist in timber casing. In front of the mill, a bridge carries Southwell Road over the river. The bridge has a brick parapet with stone coping, and beyond it is a mill pond with an iron sluice gate.	II
Telephone kiosk 53.11115°N 0.98605°W		1935	The K6 type telephone kiosk in Church Lane was designed by Giles Gilbert Scott. Constructed in cast iron with a square plan and a dome, it has three unperforated crowns in the top panels.	II
