= Rapid compression machine =

A Rapid compression machine (RCM) is an experimental device used to simulate a single compression stroke of an internal combustion engine. A rapid compression machine can be used for chemical kinetics studies. It is often used as an alternative to a shock tube for understanding specifically low-to-intermediate temperature autoignition chemistry under idealized automotive engine conditions.
