= Widnes Laboratory =

British research institute

- ICI General Chemicals Widnes Research Laboratory
- Location within Cheshire
- Former names: ICI Widnes

General information
- Type: Chemical Research Centre
- Location: Widnes
- Coordinates: 53°21′29″N 2°44′17″W
- Elevation: 15 m (49 ft)
- Completed: 1891
- Client: ICI
- Owner: ICI

The Widnes Laboratory was a research institute in northern Cheshire, run by Imperial Chemical Industries.

== History ==
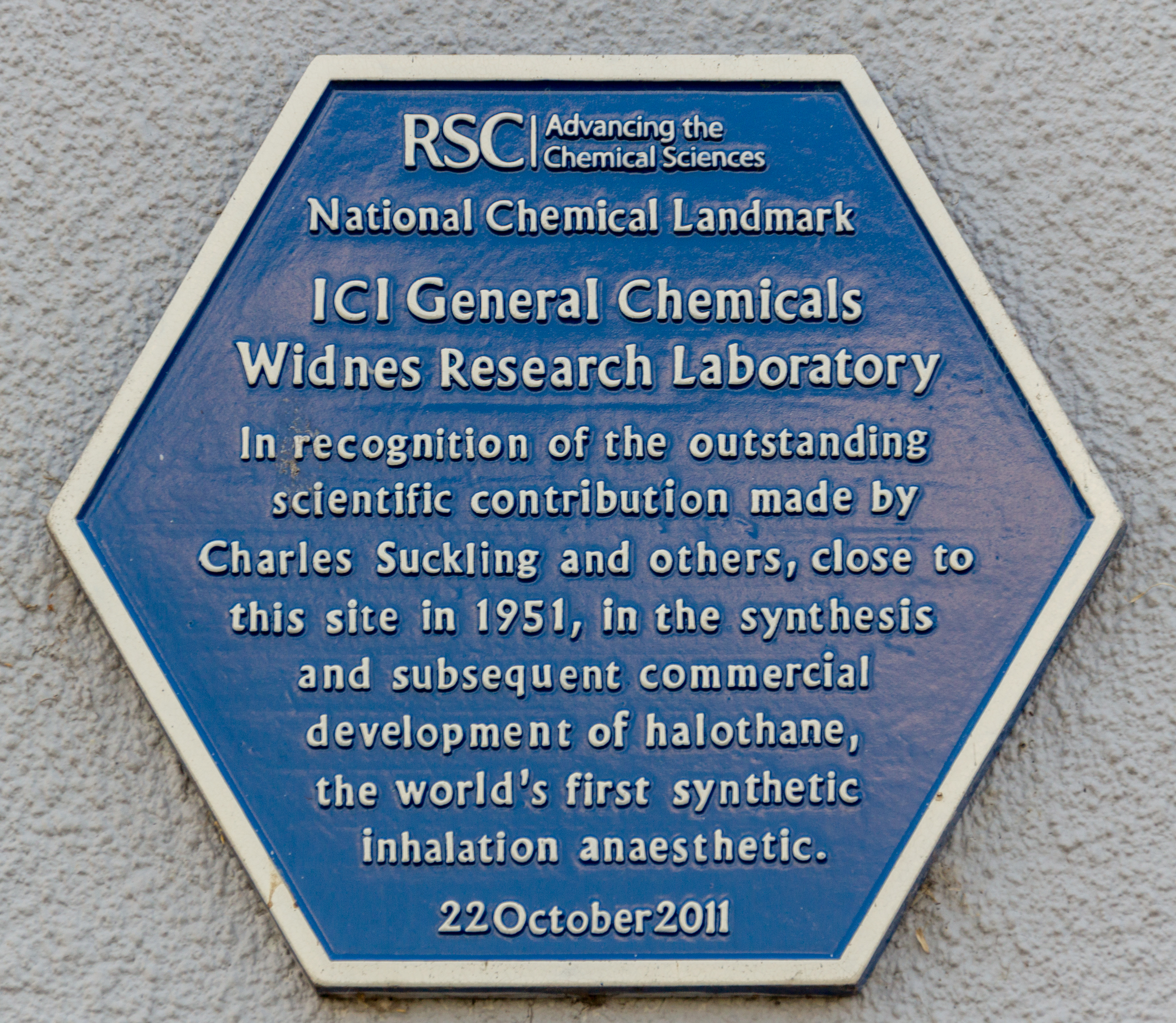
The blue plaque for the laboratory

The site opened in 1891 as the Central Laboratory.

On Monday 7 August 1950, an explosion at the site killed one man and injured another.

=== Discovery of halothane ===
Work was carried out at Widnes Laboratory from 1951 to 1956 which led to the discovery of halothane in 1955. Halothane gas was the most common anaesthetic for many years.

There had been deaths with halothane and liver damage, and was discontinued from the 1980s. Anaesthetic deployment in hospitals is mostly with intravenous compounds and then isoflurane gas, discovered by Ross Terrell in the US.

== Structure ==
The site was demolished, and now lies under the A533.

== See also ==
- Winnington Laboratory, also ICI
