= Leslie Bretherick =

British chemist

Leslie Bretherick (1926–2003) was a chemist and an “internationally recognized authority on laboratory safety” especially remembered for writing the book which became Bretherick's Handbook of Reactive Chemical Hazards, an indexed guide to published data on dangerous chemical reactions. An obituary said “His contributions have improved the lives of countless millions, and I will aver, have saved the lives of thousands”.

== Life ==
Bretherick was born in 1926 and received a BSc from the University of Liverpool in 1946 He worked for May & Baker from 1945 to 1960, where a personal injury and a near-miss provoked his lifelong interest in the prevention of chemical accidents. He then had two years in chemical production at L. Light & Co before moving to BP Research Centre, Sunbury-on-Thames, in 1962 where he stayed till his early retirement in 1982. It was there that he produced his magnum opus, nearly 1000 pages summarizing published literature on chemical accidents and dangerous reactions, organised by individual compound in 1975. A second edition followed in 1979. As well as corrections and additional reactions, this contained a new section dealing with groups of compounds and some other matters. A third edition followed in 1985, Bretherick having retired in 1982 in order to work full-time on the project. In the preface to the 4th edition (1989) he announced that his eyesight was failing. As a result, he did not contribute new material to further editions, which was done by others. The fourth edition onwards were titled Bretherick’s Handbook of Reactive Chemical Hazards.

In 1988, Bretherick received the American Chemical Society (ACS) Chemical Health and Safety Award for his outstanding contributions in the field of chemical health and safety.

He was a Chartered Chemist and Fellow of the Royal Society of Chemistry (RSC). He also edited a RSC handbook on chemical laboratory hazards, as well as numerous articles on chemical safety. He was selected as one of the RSC’s “175 Faces of Chemistry” noting that his achievements were made despite poor eyesight (and eventual near blindness) and a stammer (he was an active member of the British Stammering Association). He was a member of the Macular Disease Society.

He died in April 2003, survived by his wife, Margaret.
