= A617 road =

Road in England

A617

Route information
- Length: 34 mi (55 km)

Major junctions
- From: Newark-on-Trent
- A46 A616 A612 A614 A6191 A6117; A60; A38 A6075; M1 A6175; A61
- To: Chesterfield

Location
- Country: United Kingdom

Road network
- Roads in the United Kingdom; Motorways; A and B road zones

The A617 road runs through the northern East Midlands, England, between Newark-on-Trent and Chesterfield.

== Route ==
The route runs south-east to north-west through the northern East Midlands, largely through former coal-mining areas. It runs largely parallel to the A616 road, around six miles further south.

=== Newark to Sutton-in-Ashfield ===
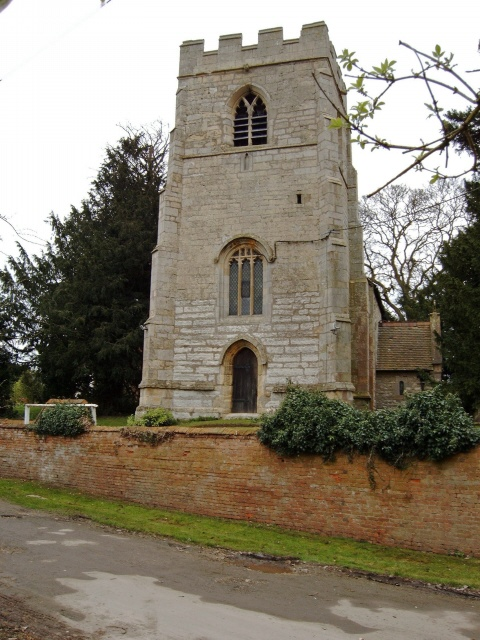
Hockerton parish church

The eastern terminus begins on the A46 Newark bypass, at the roundabout with the A616, on the former route of the Great North Road in the Newark and Sherwood district of Nottinghamshire, as a trunk road. It traverses the Trent Valley, crossing the River Trent at a Kelham Bridge (a narrow bridge only really passable by light traffic). Kelham Bridge was built in 1857 when larger road vehicles never existed, and is mildly dangerous. The eastern terminus of the route was formerly in Kelham, where it met the former route of the A616 at a T-junction. It meets the Trent Valley Way, which it follows to Averham. A mile to the south is Staythorpe Power Station, with a traffic lights exit to the south, and the route is crossed by electricity lines. Before Micklebarrow Hill, the A612 leaves to the west at traffic lights for Southwell. It passes through Hockerton and the Spread Eagle, following a northern ridge of the River Greet, further to the south. There is a long straight towards Kirklington, passing Maxeys Farm Shop.

It passes through Kirklington, known for its former Kirklington Hall Research Station, now a residential special school, and the road is crossed by the Robin Hood Way. There is an exit to the north for Eakring, and its National Grid Training Centre. It passes to the south of Bilsthorpe, with an exit to the south to Hexgreave Park (in Farnsfield). Close to a line of pylons, it crosses the former north-south Southwell-Mansfield railway line, and further on officially enters Sherwood Forest, before an exit to the south for Farnsfield. To the north is Lockwell Hill Activity Centre. Entering the parish of Rainworth, it meets the busy north–south A614 at the busy Lockwell Hill Roundabout and approaches Rainworth on Centenary Avenue. Rainworth is now bypassed, and the former route is the B6020. The eastern end of the bypass crosses a former railway, and meets the B6020 at a roundabout, where the dual carriageway begins, close to the JET Python Hill Service Station on the B6020. The main characteristic of this dual-carriageway, heavily landscaped bypass is that it was obviously built in anticipation of a similar (dual-carriageway) bypass of Mansfield, which although planned, never arose, and was built as single carriageway instead. There is an exit to the north with traffic lights for a coal disposal point.

The Rainworth bypass crosses Clipstone Forest and Rainworth Water, enters Mansfield District, and meets the former route of the A617 at the large landscaped Three Thorn Roundabout (named after Three Thorn Hollow Farm), built in anticipation of a bridge over the roundabout at the junction. The £8m Rainworth Bypass, built by Birse, was opened on Friday 23 June 2000 at 1.30pm with a commemorative plaque unveiled on the trussed footbridge to Strawberry Hill. To the north of the roundabout is Ransom Wood Business Park. A large wind farm is to the south, and the bypass meets the A6117 at a roundabout, and the A60 at an at-grade junction, where it enters the district of Ashfield, another former coal mining district. It passes under the A611 and meets the A38 Sutton-in-Ashfield bypass. The Mansfield Bypass (MARR) has no grade-separated junctions. The southern section from Rainworth to the A38 opened on 21 December 2004 and was built by Alfred McAlpine, and designed by Babtie, Shaw and Morton of Glasgow.

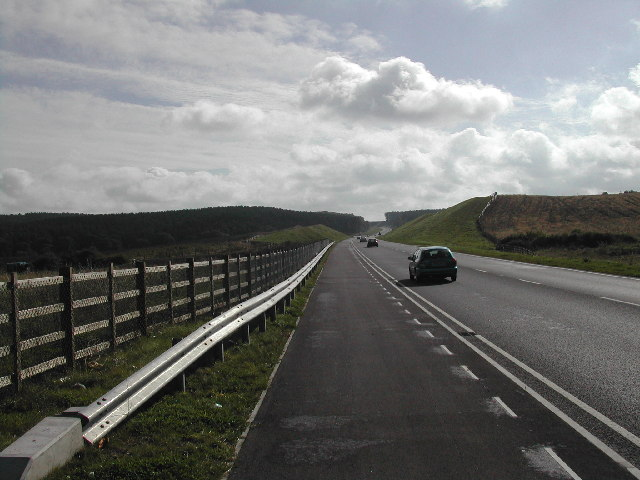
The Sherwood Way Mansfield Bypass in September 2005; the 6-mile £31m Mansfield and Ashfield Regeneration Route opened in December 2004

=== Sutton-in-Ashfield to Chesterfield ===
The road briefly follows the A38 trunk road towards Mansfield. The King's Mill Hospital is directly to the east, and the road follows a route first built as the A6075, and is a non-trunk road. This is the western section of the Mansfield Bypass. Entering Mansfield district, the route of the Mansfield bypass follows a new route of the A617 to Radmanthwaite, where it meets the former route, now the dual-carriageway A6191.

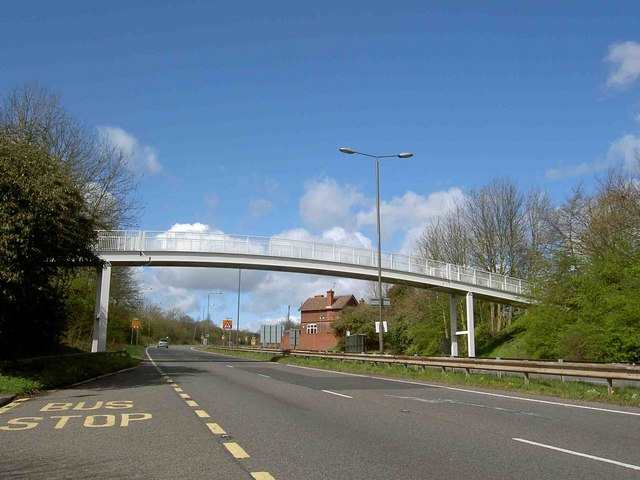
Pleasley Bypass in December 2014; there have been plans for a Pleasley Bypass extension and a Glapwell Bypass

It passes through Pleasleyhill, becoming dual-carriageway where it crosses the River Meden entering Derbyshire and Bolsover District, meeting the B6407 and B6417 at the large Pleasley Roundabout with access for the Sports Direct warehouse at Shirebrook via the B6407; the Pleasley Bypass was built in the early 1970s. The JET Staleys garage at the eastern end of Glapwell closed in 2011. It passes through Glapwell, passing the Crown Carveries Young Vanish, and the Plug and Feathers At Bramley Vale there is Eve Trakway and the Bramley Vale Fish Bar. This is the site of the former Glapwell Colliery. At Doe Lea in Ault Hucknall, the road deviates to a dual-carriageway section to the north, built in anticipation of the M1, entering North East Derbyshire.

The road meets the M1 motorway and A6175 at the busy Heath Interchange in Heath and Holmewood. 13.5 miles of the M1 were opened on Wednesday 25 October 1967, when the section from Pinxton (junction 28) to Barlborough (junction 30) opened, including junction 29, built by John Laing Construction. Construction began in July 1965. To improve access to Chesterfield from the M1 to the south, a new section of dual carriageway was built. On the east-bound carriageway is the Esso Heath Service Station with a Subway. The former route takes part of the B6039 through the parish of Grassmoor, Hasland and Winsick and Hasland in Chesterfield district; the A617 Hasland Bypass opened on 15 September 1978. There is a grade-separated junction with the B6425. The road enters the borough of Chesterfield, and the western terminus is with the A61 at the Lordsmill Roundabout, having crossed under the Midland Main Line.
