= Winnington Laboratory =

- ICI Winnington
- Former ICI works in November 2005

- Location within Cheshire
- Former names: ICI Research Laboratory
- Alternative names: Alkali Division Research Laboratories

General information
- Type: Chemical Research Centre
- Location: Winnington, Cheshire, CW8 4DU
- Coordinates: 53.2687°N 2.5327°W
- Elevation: 30 m (98 ft)
- Client: ICI
- Owner: ICI

The Winnington Laboratory was a former chemical laboratory at Winnington, near Northwich, in Cheshire, England.

== History ==
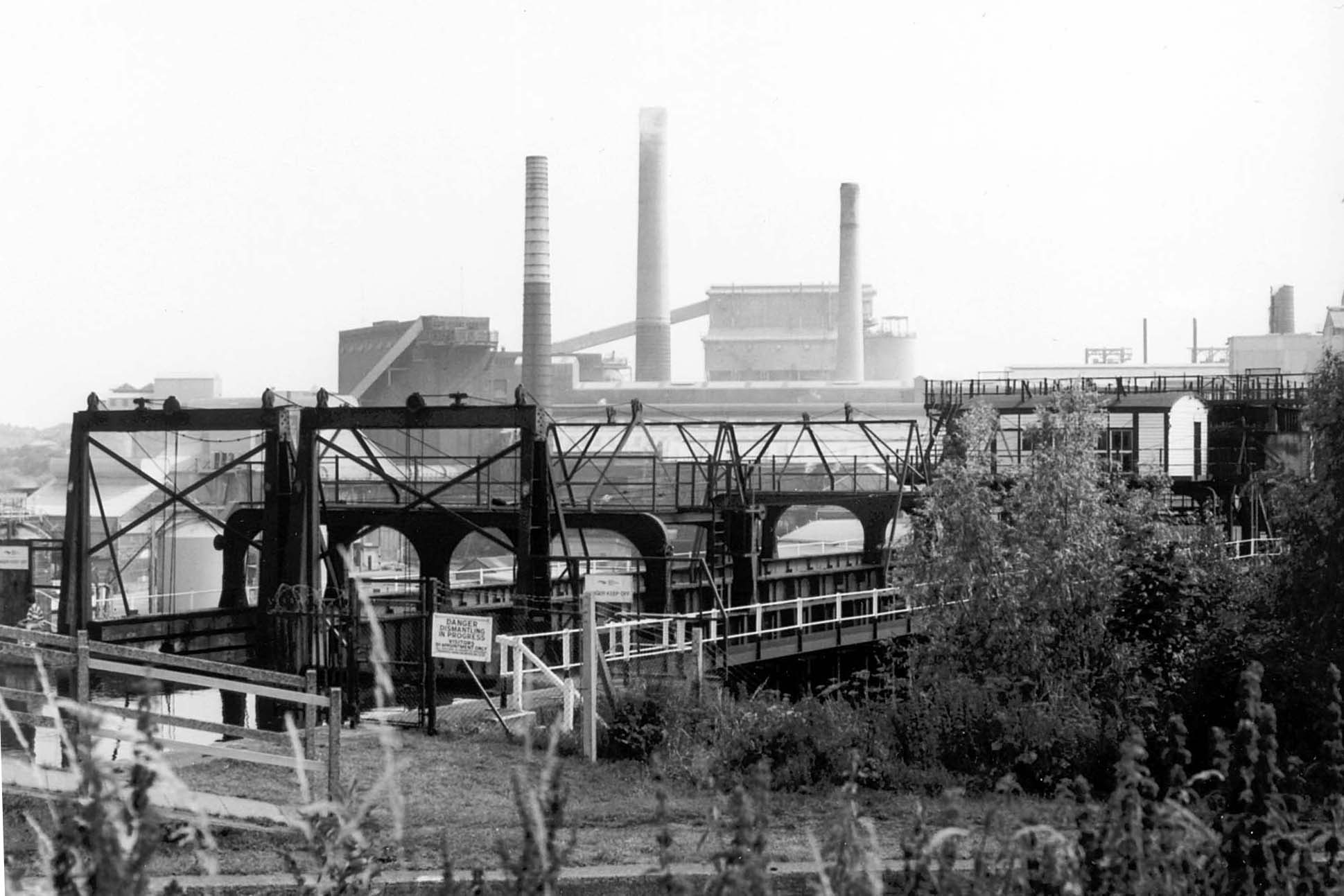
Winnington Works in 1992

The Winnington Works were built in 1874.

The laboratory was set up by the ICI Alkali Division of Imperial Chemical Industries. The chemist Francis Arthur Freeth arrived in 1907, and became head of the laboratory. ICI was formed in 1926.

=== Discovery of polythene ===
On 24 March 1933 two scientists conducted an experiment that produced polythene (polyethylene). Benzaldehyde was reacted with ethene (ethylene) at 2,000 atmospheres pressure. Sir Michael Perrin worked with this group of scientists from October 1933 until 1938. In December 1935 he conducted an experiment that allowed polythene to be created. Polythene is the world's most widespread plastic.

In 1958, manufacture of polythene was moved to ICI's plant in Hertfordshire (ICI Plastics).

== Structure ==
The laboratory was off the A533 next to the River Weaver and south of Barnton, Cheshire. The nearby chemical works makes soda ash (sodium carbonate). 280 staff worked at the laboratory.

== See also ==
- Billingham Manufacturing Plant, former ICI fertiliser plant
- British Plastics Federation
- ICI Fibres Research Centre at Harrogate
- Widnes Laboratory, where the world's first synthetic general anaesthetic gas was developed

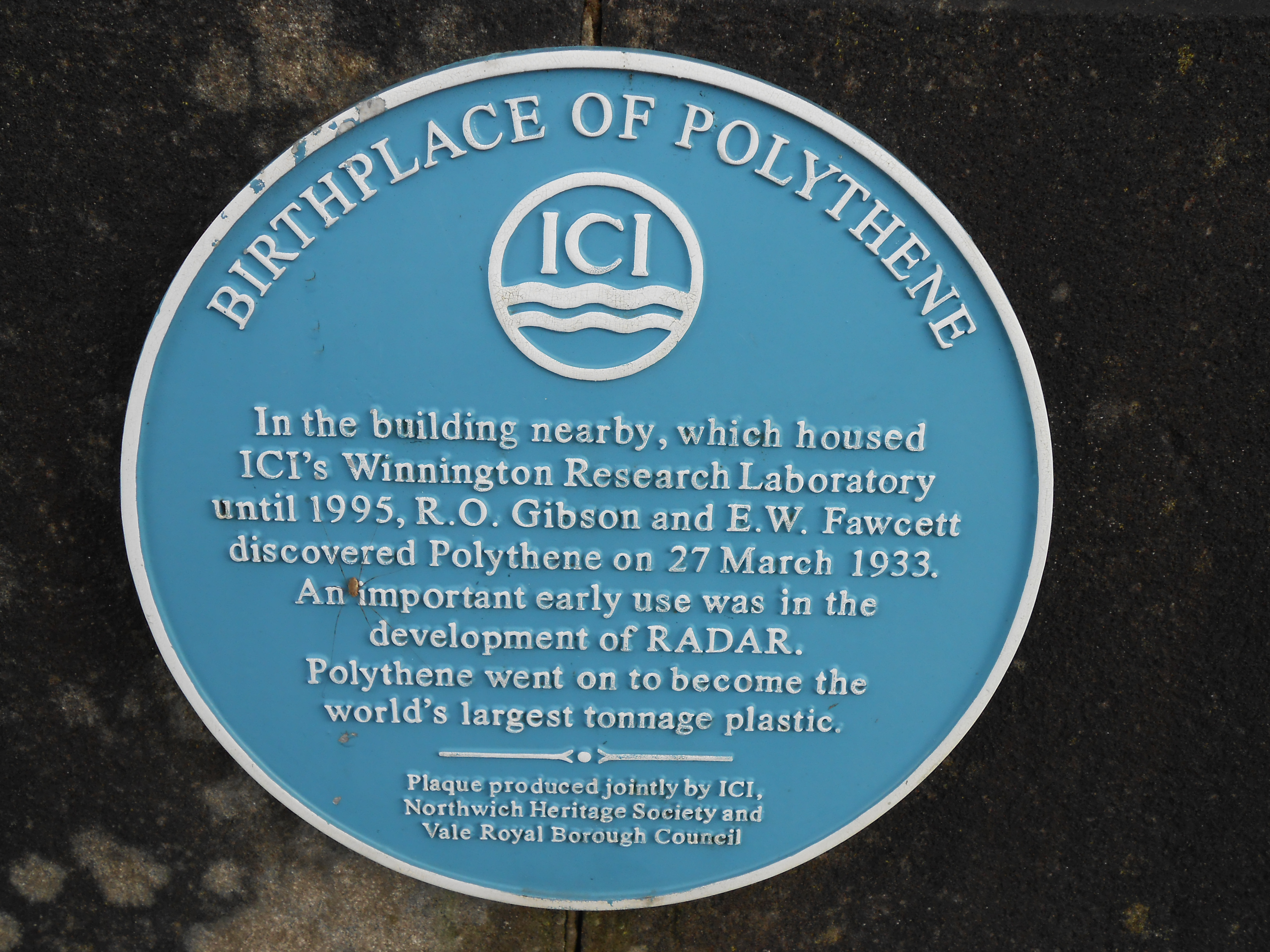
Polythene invention memorial
