= Kirklington, Nottinghamshire =

Village and civil parish in Nottinghamshire, England

Coordinates: 53.11126°N 0.98560°W

Kirklington
- Village and civil parish
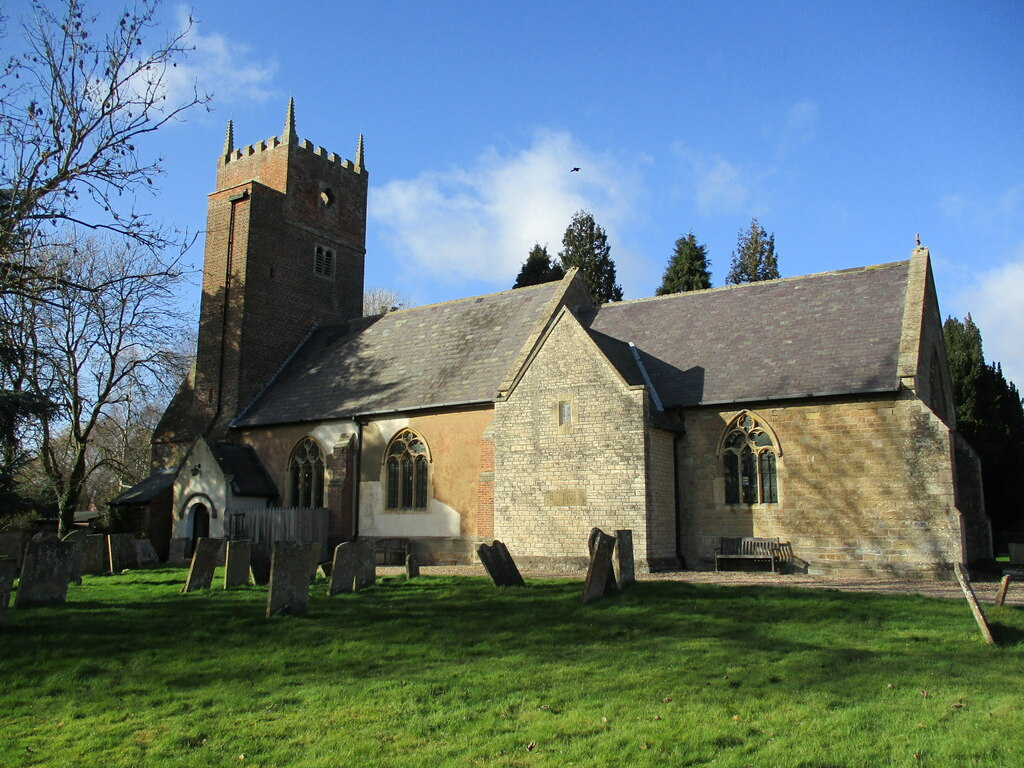
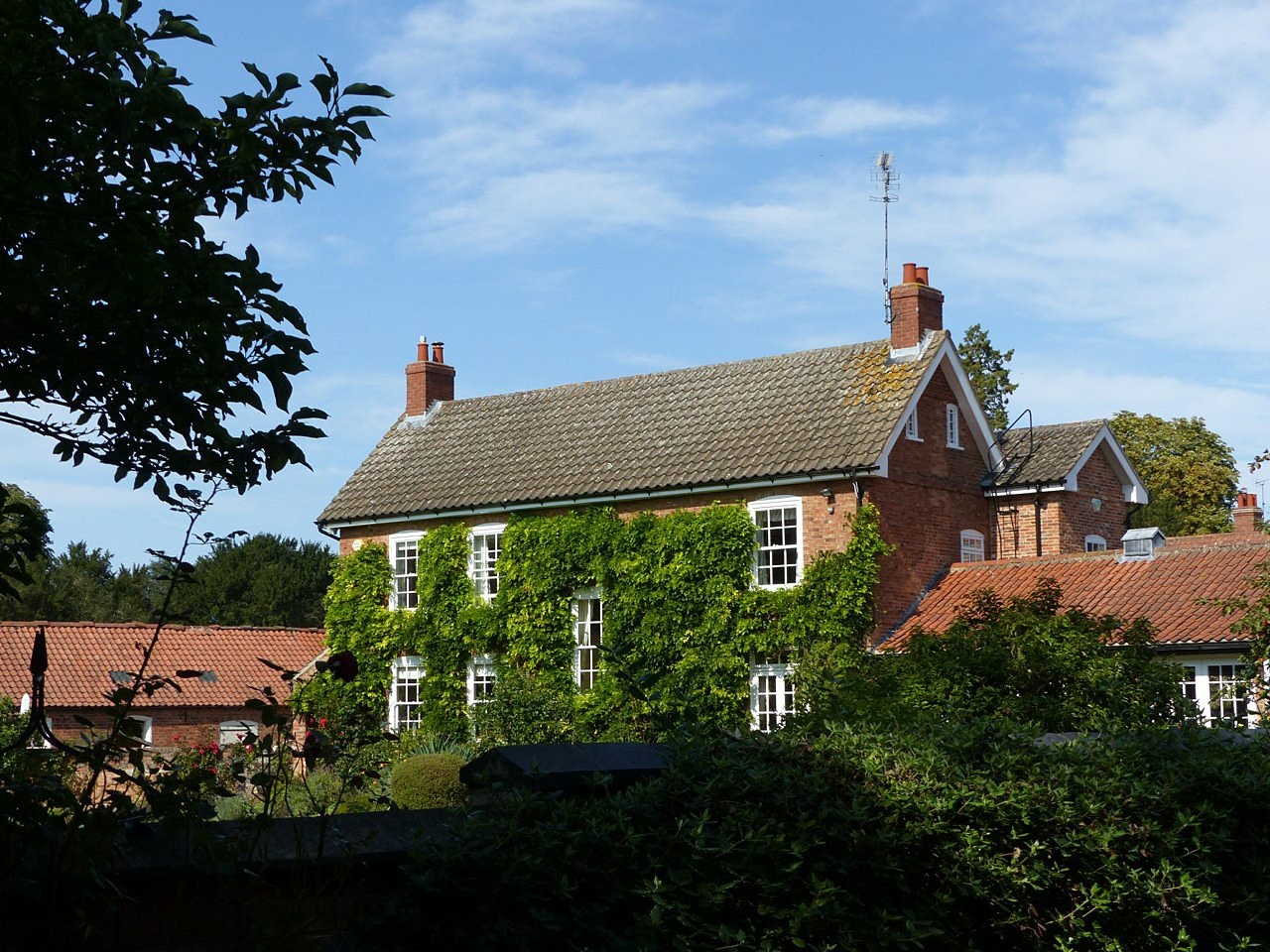
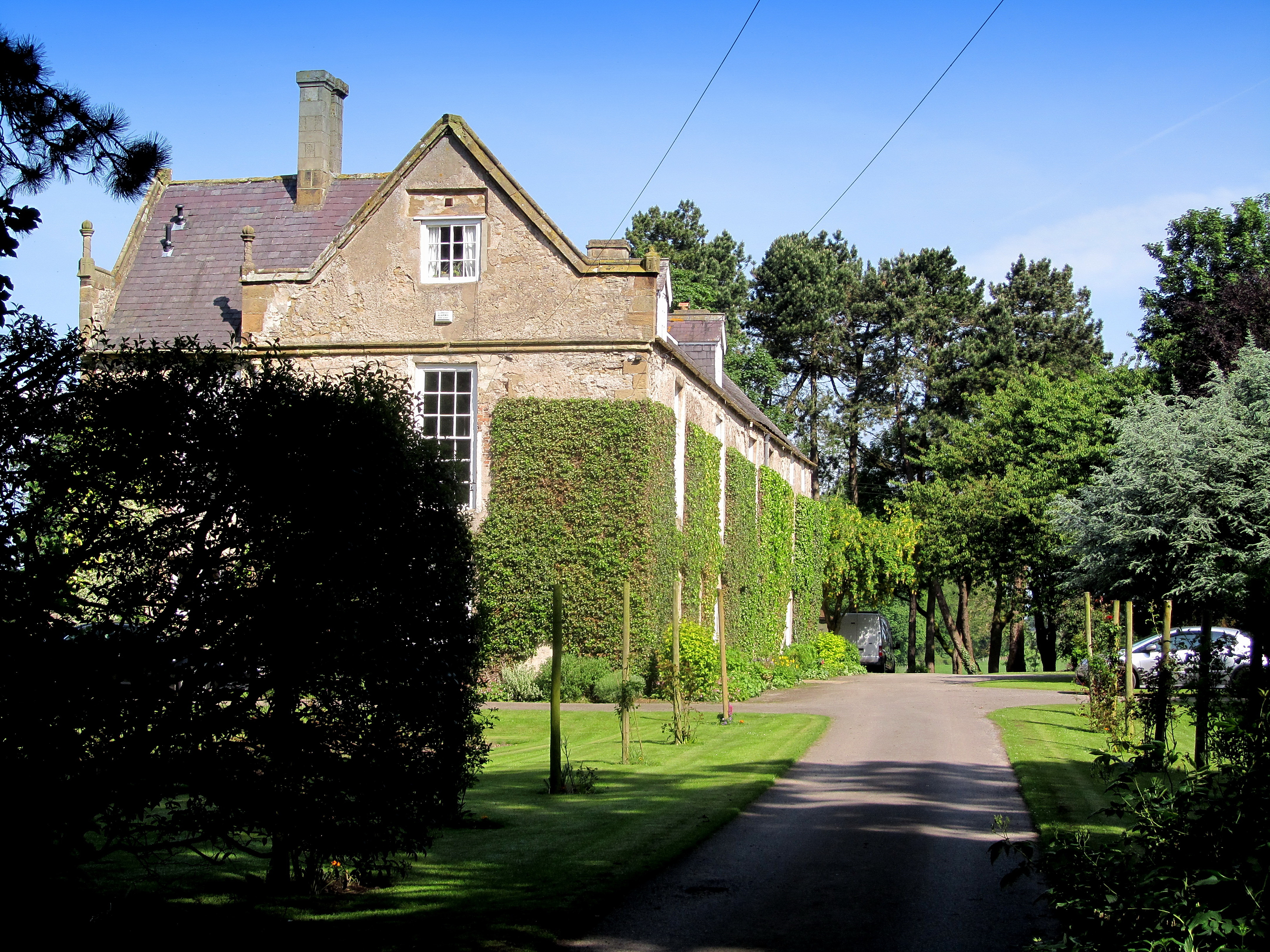
- St Swithun's Church Hall Farmhouse The Hall

- Location within Nottinghamshire
- Interactive map of Kirklington
- Area: 3.1 sq mi (8.0 km^{2})
- Population: 388 (2021)
  - Density: 125/sq mi (48/km^{2})
- OS grid reference: SK 675572
  - London: 115 mi (185 km) SSE
- District: Newark and Sherwood
- Shire county: Nottinghamshire
- Region: East Midlands
- Country: England
- Sovereign state: United Kingdom
- Post town: NEWARK
- Postcode district: NG22
- Dialling code: 01636
- Police: Nottinghamshire
- Fire: Nottinghamshire
- Ambulance: East Midlands
- UK Parliament: Newark
- Website: www.kirklingtonparishcouncil.gov.uk

Kirklington is a village and civil parish in the Newark and Sherwood district of Nottinghamshire, England. The population as of the 2011 census was 400, falling to 388 at the 2021 census. Kirklington lies on the A617 road between Newark (9½ miles to the east) and Mansfield (10 miles to the west).

Kirklington once had a railway station on the Mansfield-Southwell line; it was closed to passenger traffic in 1929 and goods trains in 1964. The former trackbed is now the Southwell Trail footpath.

The place-name Kirklington seems to contain an Old English personal name, Cyrtla, + tun (Old English), an enclosure; a farmstead; a village; an estate.., so 'Cyrtla's farm or settlement'. It might instead stem from Kirk-, an element found in a number of place names in the United Kingdom, deriving from kirk (Norse), a general assembly; a church. This may refer to St. Swithun's Church, the parish church located in Kirklington.

== Notable people ==
- John Boddam-Whetham (1843–1918), cricketer and naturalist
- Sir Albert Bennett, 1st Baronet (1872—1945), barrister and politician

== See also ==
- Listed buildings in Kirklington, Nottinghamshire
