= Hockerton =

Village and civil parish in Nottinghamshire, England

Coordinates: 53°6′3.9″N 0°55′49.99″W

- Village and civil parish
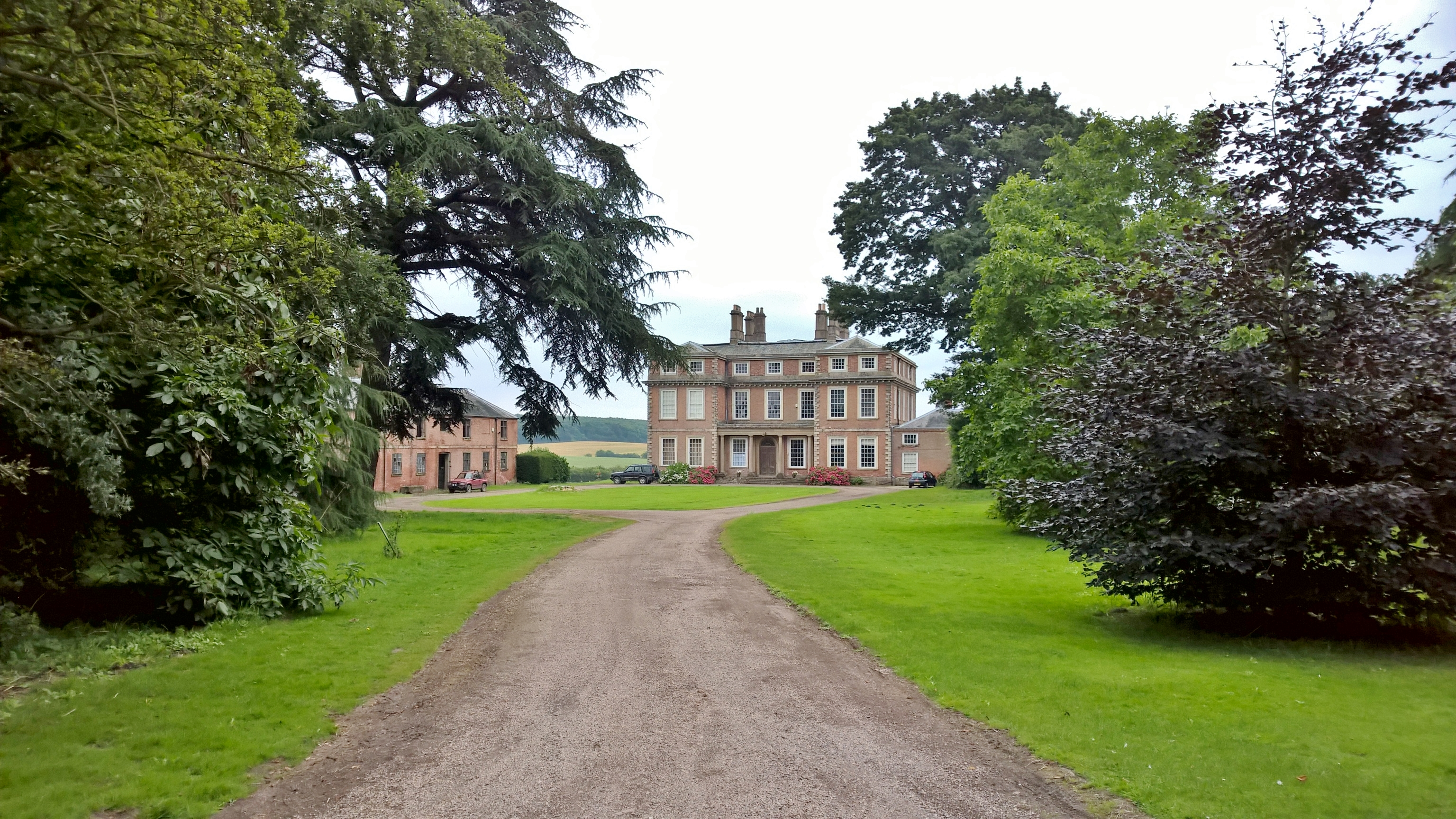
- Winkburn Hall

- Location within Nottinghamshire
- Interactive map of Hockerton
- Area: 2.16 sq mi (5.6 km^{2})
- Population: 183 (2021)
  - Density: 85/sq mi (33/km^{2})
- OS grid reference: SK 715565
  - London: 115 mi (185 km) SSE
- District: Newark and Sherwood
- Shire county: Nottinghamshire
- Region: East Midlands
- Country: England
- Sovereign state: United Kingdom
- Post town: Southwell
- Postcode district: NG25
- Dialling code: 01636
- Police: Nottinghamshire
- Fire: Nottinghamshire
- Ambulance: East Midlands
- UK Parliament: Newark
- Website: hockerton.com

Hockerton is a village and civil parish in Nottinghamshire, England. It is 2 miles from the town of Southwell on the A617 between Newark and Mansfield. Fewer than 60 houses are situated around the church, the Spread Eagle pub and village hall. The population at the 2011 census was 146, increasing to 183 at the 2021 census. The local properties range from the carbon neutral housing of the Hockerton Housing Project to converted barns, 1960s and 1970s housing together with much older houses and a 19th-century Rectory. The parish church of St Nicholas is Norman with an aisleless nave and a 14th-century chancel.

Part of the village contains Hockerton Housing Project. The Hockerton Housing Project is the UK's first earth sheltered, self-sufficient ecological housing development.

A group of residents formed an Industrial and Provident Society (IPS) called Sustainable Hockerton Limited in 2009. Official Web Page Sustainable Hockerton, also described by everybodys-talking Sustainable Hockerton. Sustainable Hockerton is also known as SHOCK. The Society has installed a wind turbine that generates electricity equal to that used by the village. Any surplus is distributed in the parish to promote sustainable development. By 2012 the Society had made £13,000 for the parish.

The place-name Hockerton seems to contain an Old English word for a hill, hocer, + tun (Old English), an enclosure; a farmstead; a village; an estate.., so 'hill or hump settlement'.

== See also ==
- Listed buildings in Hockerton
