= Esso Research Centre =

- Location within Oxfordshire

General information
- Type: Chemical Research Centre
- Location: Oxfordshire
- Coordinates: 51.61°N 1.32°W
- Elevation: 95 m (312 ft)
- Client: Esso
- Owner: Esso Petroleum Company Limited
- Landlord: Esso Research

The Esso Research Centre was a research centre in Oxfordshire.

== History ==
The site was Esso's main European technical centre for fuels and lubricants. The site was extended in 1957. Operations ceased in the early 2000s.

== Structure ==
The site had the staff of Esso Research, with around 500 scientists and engineers.

== Function ==
It conducted research into chemistry.

== Location ==
It was situated on the western side of the A4130 (the original A34 trunk route) on Milton Hill, above Steventon, Oxfordshire. On disposal the site was split in two, between the headquarters of Infineum and the Milton Hill Business and Technology Centre. By 2018 the site had been cleared.

== See also ==
- The Esso research centre at Brussels, costing £3m, opened on May 15 1968
