= Cris Tinley =

English cricketer (1830–1900)

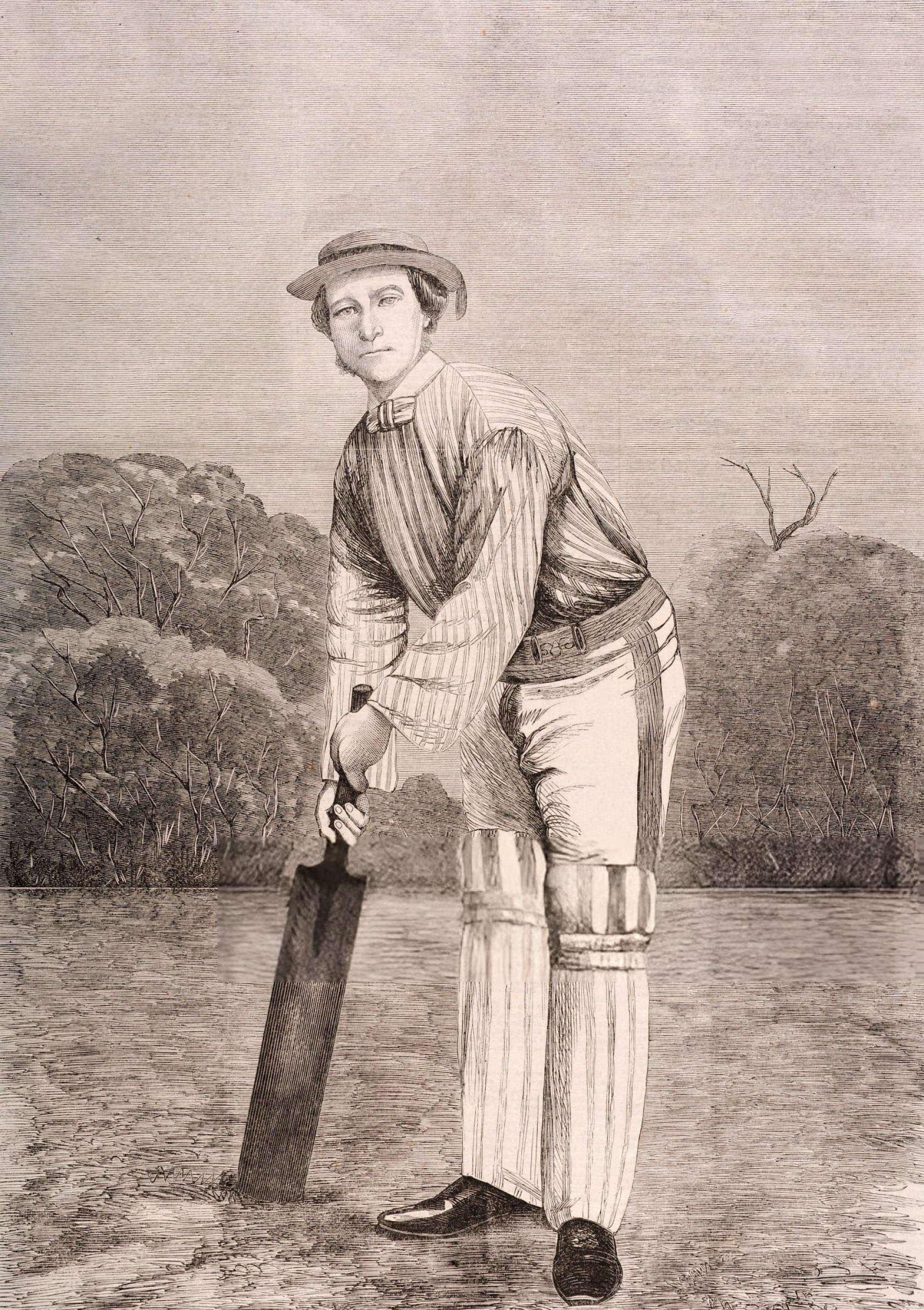
- Tinley in The Illustrated Sporting News, 1864

Personal information
- Full name: Robert Crispin Tinley
- Born: 25 October 1830; Southwell, Nottinghamshire, England
- Died: 11 December 1900 (aged 70); Burton-on-Trent, Staffordshire, England
- Nickname: The Spider
- Batting: Right-handed
- Bowling: Right-arm underarm
- Relatives: Francis Tinley (brother); Vincent Tinley (brother)

Domestic team information
- Years: Team
- 1847–1869: Nottinghamshire

Robert Crispin Tinley (25 October 1830 – 11 December 1900) was an English cricket professional who played during the middle of the 19th century. In a career that spanned from 1847 to 1874, he was a noted underarm bowler who represented the Nottinghamshire County Cricket Club, debuting with the club aged 16. As a cricketer, he appeared in 117 matches, scoring over 2,000 runs and taking over 300 wickets. He represented the North of England cricket team in the regular North v South fixture over a dozen times. Tinley had a long association with the All England Eleven (AEE), which usually played "odds" matches, in which he recorded numerous instances of ten or more wickets in an innings. As a participant in the second English cricket tour of Australia in 1864, Tinley was their leading wicket-taker. After his playing career, he ran a Burton-on-Trent inn.

== Early life and career ==
Tinley was born in Southwell, Nottinghamshire, on 25 October 1830. Part of a cricketing family, he had two older brothers, Francis and Vincent, that also played.

He debuted with Nottinghamshire on 9 August 1847 in a match against England (i.e., the "rest" of England) that was played as a benefit for Thomas Barker. Aged 16 and 288 days, he was the youngest player to represent Nottinghamshire at the time, a distinction he held for 177 years until Farhan Ahmed debuted at an age three months younger in 2024. In Tinley's debut match, he took six total wickets, three in both innings, while scoring 14 total runs as a batter.

Over the next five years, Tinley made sporadic appearances in cricket due to commitments to a minor cricket club in Burton-on-Trent. These appearances included a pair of matches for Nottinghamshire against Sussex in 1848 and matches for three different clubs in 1851, including his first appearance for the North in the regular North v South match. After the 1853 season, Tinley's tenure in Burton-on-Trent ended, and he would spend much of the next two decades playing most prominently with Nottinghamshire and with William Clarke's All England Eleven.

== With Nottinghamshire and the North of England ==
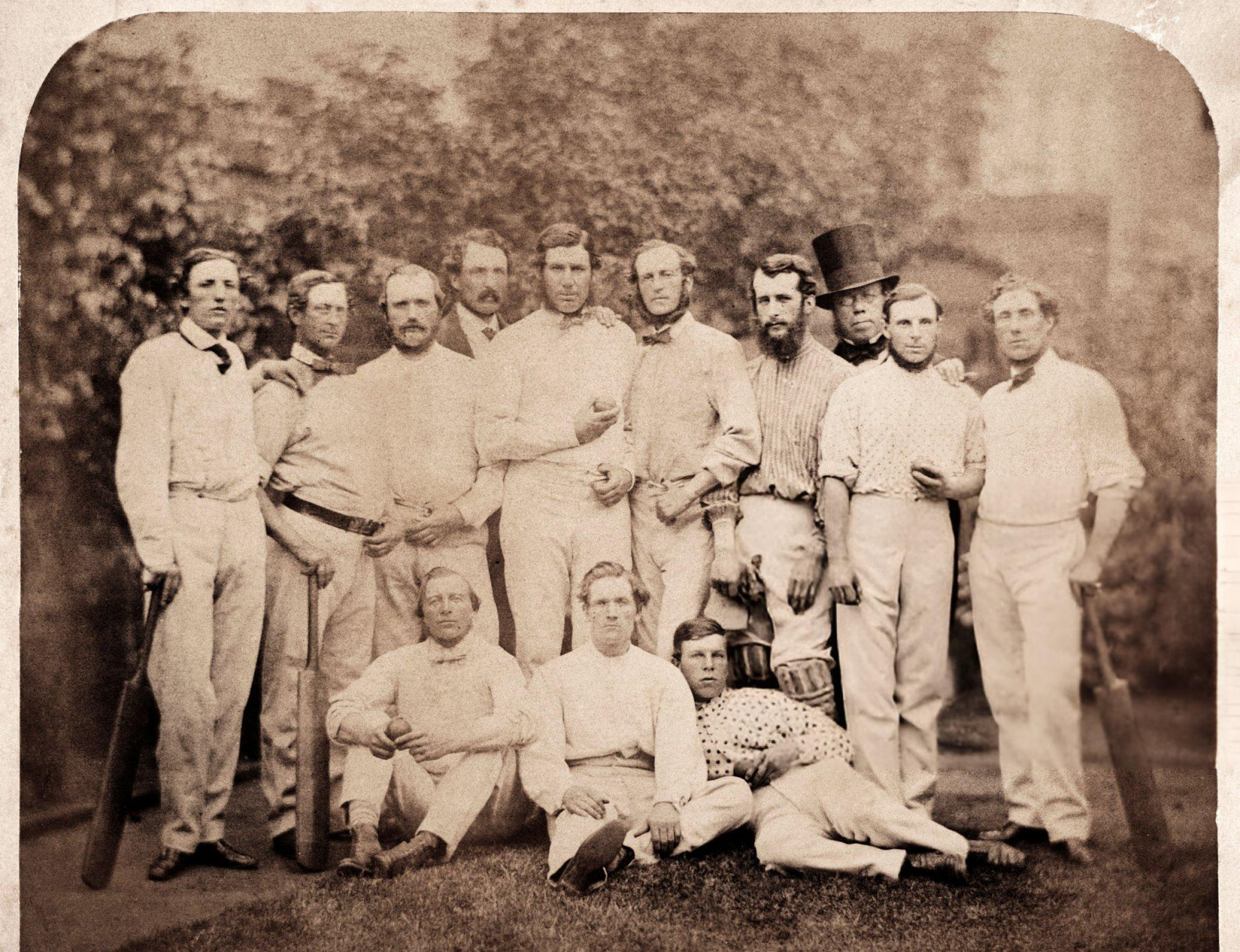
Tinley, seated in the front row on the left, represented the Nottinghamshire team (pictured here in 1862) for over two decades.

In matches, Tinley represented Nottinghamshire 54 times between his 1847 debut and his final county match in 1869. He recorded his first five-wicket haul for the team in 1859, one of eleven Tinley would have with them. Tinley had a ten-wicket haul in three of his matches with the club. His best numbers for an innings and a match came in the same contest; against Cambridgeshire in 1862, Tinley took eight wickets for only twelve runs in the first innings, then added seven more in the second innings for a total of fifteen overall. Over his entire career with Nottinghamshire, he took 138 wickets with a 14.99 bowling average.

Between 1851 and 1865, Tinley also appeared in 25 matches for the North of England, and had some of his earliest cricket successes with them. As a bowler, he took his first five-wicket haul for the North versus Surrey in 1857, two years prior to his first for Nottinghamshire; at the crease, Tinley recorded his two best batting totals: 53 runs in a 1858 match versus the South of England and 56 runs in a 1862 match against Surrey. As with his Nottinghamshire tenure, he recorded his best innings as a bowler in the same match; taking on Surrey in 1860, he took twelve total wickets through a pair of six-wicket hauls, yielding 30 runs in the first innings for his innings-best performance. Overall, he took 82 wickets as a member of the North team.

== With the All England Eleven ==
Tinley played frequently with the All England Eleven between 1854 and 1874, including in 21 matches. Compared to his time with his other major teams, he was used less often as a bowler in their matches, (Note: Tinley bowled half the amount of deliveries with the AEE as he did with the North, despite only playing in four additional matches with the latter.) with 42 wickets in 21 appearances, but he still produced a bowling average of 14.52, lower than his averages with Nottinghamshire and the North.

He appeared in many more odds matches played by the AEE that were not granted status. In these matches, Tinley's bowling was even more successful and resulted in two seasons, 1860 and 1862, where he took over 300 wickets in a season for the AEE. His best performances with the club featured Tinley recording normally impossible stat lines; these included 10 matches where he took 15 or more wickets in a single innings, with a 19-wicket haul (out of 21 wickets on offer) being his highest total. In a match against an eighteen-man team representing Hallam at Hyde Park, Tinley took all seventeen wickets available in the second innings, while a match against Birmingham at Small Heath saw Tinley make twelve catches in a match.

== Touring Australia ==
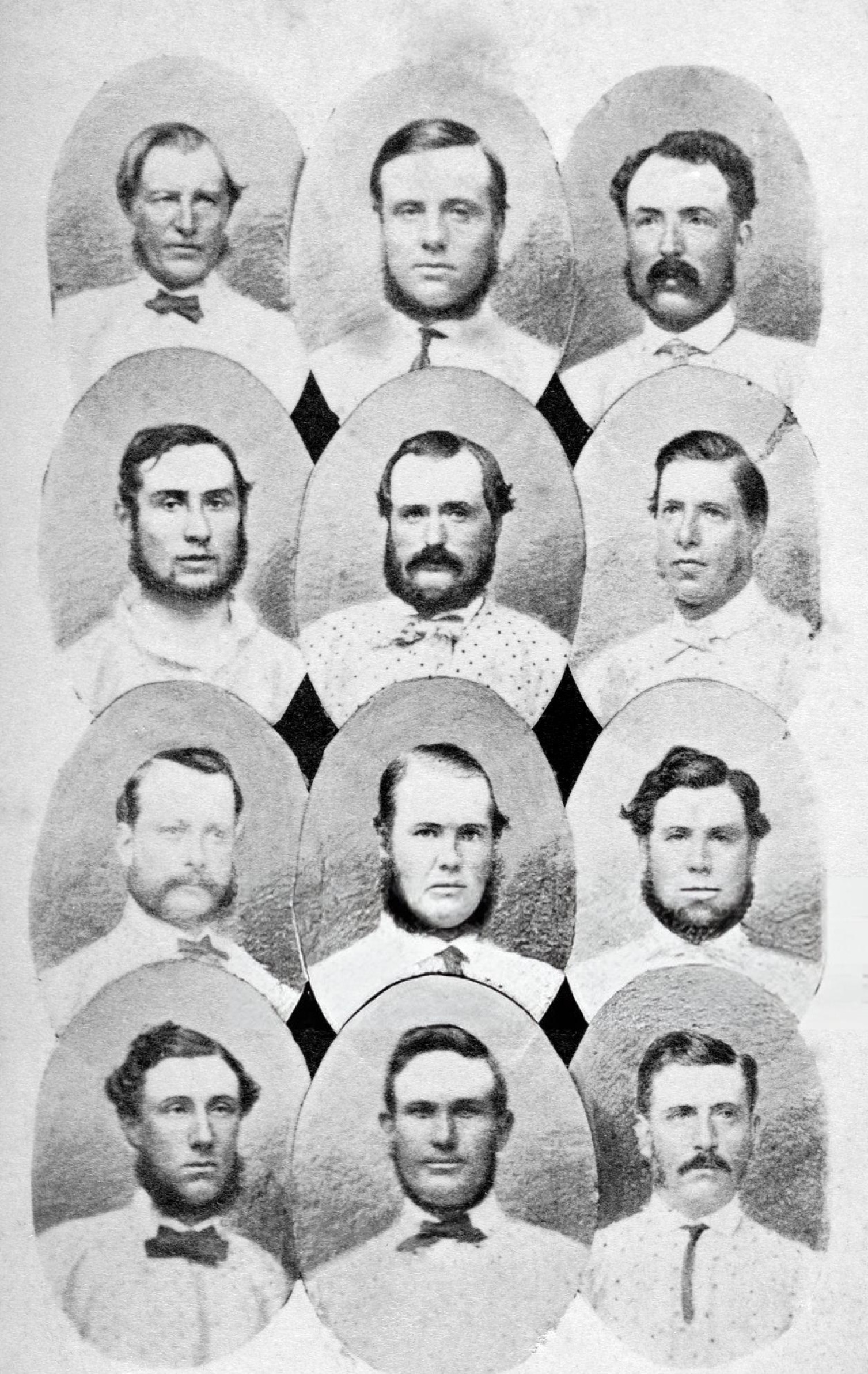
Composite of the 12-man party that toured Australia in 1864. Tinley (pictured in the upper left) was their leading wicket-taker.

George Parr, at that time the captain of Nottinghamshire, selected Tinley as part of a twelve-man tour of Australia and New Zealand that started on the first day of 1864. The tour mostly featured odds matches in which local teams of 22 played against English elevens, with the tour's sole eleven-a-side match taking place on 5 March 1864. In that match, Tinley, representing Parr's chosen eleven took seven wickets in the first innings against a George Anderson-chosen team. (Note: Parr and Anderson, also part of Parr's touring party, both chose teams that featured six English players and five Australians for this match.) The seven wickets were a match high, but it ultimately came in a losing effort to Anderson's team. On the tour, he led all of the touring players with over 250 wickets taken overall.

== With other clubs ==
Compared to 25 selections for the North, Tinley only had three selections to the Gentlemen v Players, as a member of the Players. Tinley did not bowl in the last of these three matches, but took five combined wickets in the other two.

He played for other teams, including nine matches for an England XI. Until his 15-wicket match for Nottinghamshire, Tinley's best match performance was for a one-off team in 1860, billed as "Another England Eleven", against the England team that had toured North America in 1859. (Note: Eleven of the 12 members of the touring party played in this match, with the 12th, John Wisden, serving as an umpire.) Tinley's team won the match, in which he took 14 wickets, including an eight-wicket haul in the second innings.

== Playing style ==
In his early career, Tinley was a right-armed fast bowler in the roundarm style but he later switched to bowling underarm lobs with greater success. Nottinghamshire's website attributes some of his success to teammate John Jackson, one of the top roundarm fast bowlers of his day, often bowling at the opposite end from Tinley.

As a batter, he was regarded as one who hit the ball hard, but not so hard as to be called a "slogger". Tinley recorded three half-centuries with a high of 56 in an innings. Despite his long tenure with Nottinghamshire, he never recorded a half-century with them.

Tinley was an adept fielder, averaging over a catch per match. When in the field, he predominantly played the point position, though he was capable enough to be used as a wicket-keeper at times, taking a pair of stumpings.

== Later life, honours, and death ==
Tinley umpired 27 matches in his career, including several matches umpired while still active as a player. His final match as an umpire took place in 1877, though he would make a final appearance as an umpire in 1880 to umpire a match in Burton-on-Trent featuring the United South of England Eleven.

Tinley was the recipient of two benefit matches, one in 1861 in an AEE match versus his former Burton-on-Trent team (which Tinley rejoined to play against the AEE on that occasion), and another in a North v South match in 1875, taking place a year after his playing career ended. A testimonial in Tinley's honour was also granted to him in 1891 by Burton-on-Trent.

He was married to Mary Jane and had a son, Fred. In retirement, he ran Burton-on-Trent's Royal Oak Inn. After being ill for several years, Tinley died on 11 December 1900.
