= Henry Stenton =

English cricketer and solicitor

Personal information
- Full name: Henry Cawdron Stenton
- Born: 15 September 1815; Southwell, Nottinghamshire, England
- Died: 6 March 1887 (aged 71); Southwell, Nottinghamshire, England
- Batting: Unknown

Career statistics
Competition	First-class
Matches	1
Runs scored	5
Batting average	–
100s/50s	–/–
Top score	5*
Catches/stumpings	–/–
- Source: Cricinfo, 31 March 2019

Henry Cawdron Stenton (15 September 1815 – 6 March 1887) was an English first-class cricketer and solicitor.

The head of a family firm of solicitors at Southwell, Stenton made a single appearance in first-class cricket for the Gentlemen of Southwell against England at Southwell in 1846. He batted once in the match, ending the Gentlemen of Southwell's first-innings not out on 5.

He died at Southwell in March 1887. His son was Sir Frank Stenton, a noted historian.
