= Hockerwood =

Former deer park of Southwell, Nottinghamshire

Hockerwood was one of the four ancient deer parks of Southwell, Nottinghamshire once belonging to the Archbishop of York. Hockerwood Park is mentioned in the Domesday Book.

== See also ==
- Forest law
- Hunting license
