= John Spray =

British singer

John Spray (c.1768 – 21 January 1827) was an acclaimed tenor singer, known for performing works by John Andrew Stevenson, who wrote a number of pieces for him including the popular Faithless Emma.

Spray was born in Southwell, Nottinghamshire, and was a chorister there. He moved to Dublin in 1795 to work as vicar choral for the Dublin cathedrals (St Patrick's Cathedral, Dublin and Christ Church Cathedral, Dublin). He received an honorary doctorate in music from Dublin University in 1821.

A memorial to Spray stands in the north transept of St. Patrick's.
