= River Greet =

River in Nottinghamshire, England

Greet
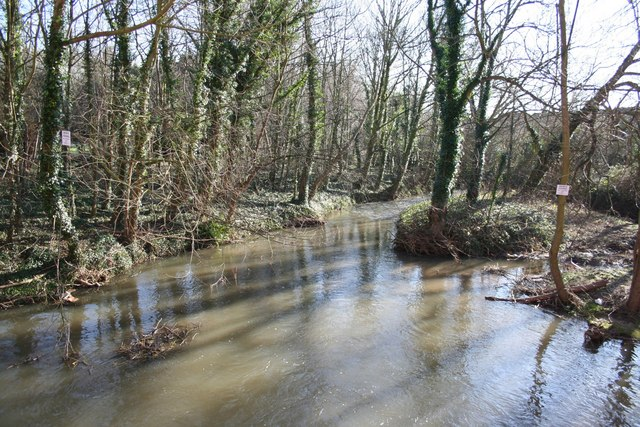
- The river downstream of Caudwell Mill, Southwell

Location
- Country: England
- County: Nottinghamshire

Physical characteristics
- Source
  - location: Kirklington
- Mouth: River Trent
  - location: Fiskerton
  - coordinates: 53°3′20″N 0°53′34″W

The River Greet is a small river in Nottinghamshire, England. Rising close to the village of Kirklington, the Greet flows in a southeasterly direction past Southwell and Rolleston to meet the River Trent at Fiskerton.

== Hydrology ==
The river has a catchment of 17.85 square miles (46.2 km^{2}) and an average flow of 6.08 million gallons (27.65 Megalitres) per day, measured at the gauging station in Southwell. The catchment receives 25.47 inches (647 mm) of rainfall in an average year. Above Southwell, the underlying geology is mainly Sherwood and Mercia sandstone, with some Mercia mudstone along the southern edge of the catchment. Below Southwell, the geology is predominantly Mercia mudstone. There is a layer of clay, sand and gravel alluvium overlaying this in the river channel. The river is greatly affected by rainfall, raising levels and muddying the water.

== Course ==
The river rises as a series of springs to the west of Kirklington, close to the 160-foot (49 m) contour. It is joined by Cotton Mill Dyke and Edingley Beck, and to the east of Kirklington, turns to flow in a south-easterly direction. Halam Beck joins from the south, and there is a disused mill at Maythorne. It was built as a cotton mill in 1795 by a hop merchant, to supply yarn to the framework knitting industry. The firm of Messrs. Bean and Johnson altered it in the early nineteenth century, after which silk and lace thread was produced. A small community was established around the mill, with cottages for some of the workers, of whom there were 70 in 1838, a general store, a public house and a mission hall. Willow for making baskets was grown in osier beds, and hops were also cultivated. The building was used as a billet for soldiers during the Second World War, by which time its industrial function had ceased. It has subsequently been converted into flats, with some of the outbuildings used as industrial workshops. There are two mill buildings, the north mill and the south mill, both of which are grade II listed structures.

Below Maythorne, the Robin Hood Way, a long-distance footpath, follows the banks of the river, which forms the northern boundary of Southwell. There is a wildfowl centre on the north bank, and Caudwell flour Mill is on the south bank. It was built over the site of Burgage mill, a medieval building, and was bought by Charles Caudwell in 1851. He increased the capacity of the mill, which was subsequently damaged by fires in 1867, 1893 and 1917. Each time the mill was rebuilt, the equipment was upgraded. The Caudwell family were millers for four generations, after which Associated British Foods bought the mill. It closed in 1977, and was turned into flats in 1989.

After leaving the mill, the river crosses under the A612 road and flows through open countryside, to reach Upton Mill. It passes to the north of Southwell Racecourse, and then turns to the south, where Rolleston Mill is built over its course. This is a late eighteenth-century brick structure, with a basement, two storeys and a garret, which still contains some of the milling equipment. It is a grade II listed structure. The river continues under the Nottingham to Lincoln Line close to Rolleston railway station, to reach Fiskerton Mill, built on the site of a medieval mill owned by the monks of Thurgaton Priory. Just beyond the mill, it passes under a minor road and into the River Trent.

== History ==
There was some sort of dispute in 1598, when the millers from Fiskerton, Rolleston and Upton went to Newark to collect corn for milling. They were detained, with their horses taken to the castle, and the corn was taken to "her majesty's mills", where it was ground and tolls were paid. Eventually the millers were set free. On another occasion, Rolleston's miller was detained by Edward Earl of Rutland, but was released when he promised not to collect any more corn from Newark. There seems to have been less of an issue when the inhabitants of Newark took their corn to the mills voluntarily.

The Willoughby family, who lived at Wollaton Hall ran a fleet of barges in the 1580s, and delivered coal to Southwell, which Caffyn has taken to mean that the river was navigable for the first 4 miles (6.4 km) to enable this to happen. Those who lived beside the river had a responsibility to keep it scoured, and on 13 July 1642 the residents of Rolleston, Southwell and Upton were indicted for not carrying out this duty.

== Ecology ==
The upper reaches of the river contain fish such as brown trout (Salmo trutta), but although coarse fish species can be found lower down, the modifications made to the channel to assist its land-drainage function have resulted in the habitat suffering, with a result that fish numbers are low. The Environment Agency, who manage the river, have applied a "Hands-Off Flow" limit to the river, which specifies that if the flow drops below 2650 Megalitres per day (Mld) in the Trent, all abstraction of water must cease, in order to protect the environment. The volume of groundwater extracted from the catchment has fallen in recent years, with the result that water levels have risen a little.

Catches of Atlantic salmon (Salmo salar) have also been reported on the river.

The Environment Agency measure the water quality in the river systems of England. Each is given an overall ecological status, which may be one of five levels: high, good, moderate, poor and bad. There are several components that are used to determine this, including biological status, which looks at the quantity and varieties of invertebrates, angiosperms and fish. Chemical status, which compares the concentrations of various chemicals against known safe concentrations, is rated good or fail.

The water quality of the Greet and its tributaries was as follows in 2019.

Section	Ecological Status	Chemical Status	Length	Catchment
Halloughton Dumble Catchment (trib of Greet)	Moderate	Fail	7.5 miles (12.1 km)	6.53 square miles (16.9 km^{2})
Greet Catchment (trib of Trent)	Poor	Fail	10.2 miles (16.4 km)	24.39 square miles (63.2 km^{2})

Reasons for the water quality being less than good include sewage discharge into the river, physical modification of the river channel, drainage of water from the transport infrastructure, runoff from agricultural land, and the presence of the invasive North American crayfish. Like most rivers in the UK, the chemical status changed from good to fail in 2019, due to the presence of polybrominated diphenyl ethers (PBDE), perfluorooctane sulphonate (PFOS) and mercury compounds, none of which had previously been included in the assessment.

== Points of interest ==
Point	Coordinates (Links to map resources)	OS Grid Ref	Notes
Springs to west of Kirklington	53.1119°N 1.0078°W	SK665576	source
Springs by Belle Eau Park	53.1249°N 1.0177°W	SK658590	source
Jn with Cotton Mill Dike	53.1080°N 0.9947°W	SK673572	
Jn of streams from sources	53.1057°N 0.9780°W	SK685569	
A612 Southwell Bridge	53.0764°N 0.9457°W	SK707537	
Rolleston Railway Bridge	53.0664°N 0.8973°W	SK739526	
Jn with River Trent	53.0554°N 0.8930°W	SK742514	mouth

== Bibliography ==
- Caffyn, Douglas John Morris (August 2010). "River Transport 1189 - 1600 (PhD thesis)" (PDF). University of Sussex. Archived from the original on 24 March 2018.
- Environment Agency (March 2008). "The Lower Trent and Erewash CAMS" (PDF). Environment Agency. Archived from the original (PDF) on 14 March 2012.
- Longhurst, E H S (1931). "A short history of Rolleston". Archived from the original on 3 March 2016.
- Marsh, T J; Hannaford, J (2008). UK Hydrometric Register. Hydrological data UK series (PDF). Centre for Ecology & Hydrology. Archived from the original (PDF) on 31 October 2014.
- Stone, Richard (2005). The River Trent. Chichester: Phillimore & Co Ltd. ISBN 978-1-86077-356-3.
