= Maythorne, Nottinghamshire =

Hamlet in the civil parish of Southwell, Nottinghamshire, England

Coordinates: 53.093°N 0.961°W

Maythorne
- Hamlet
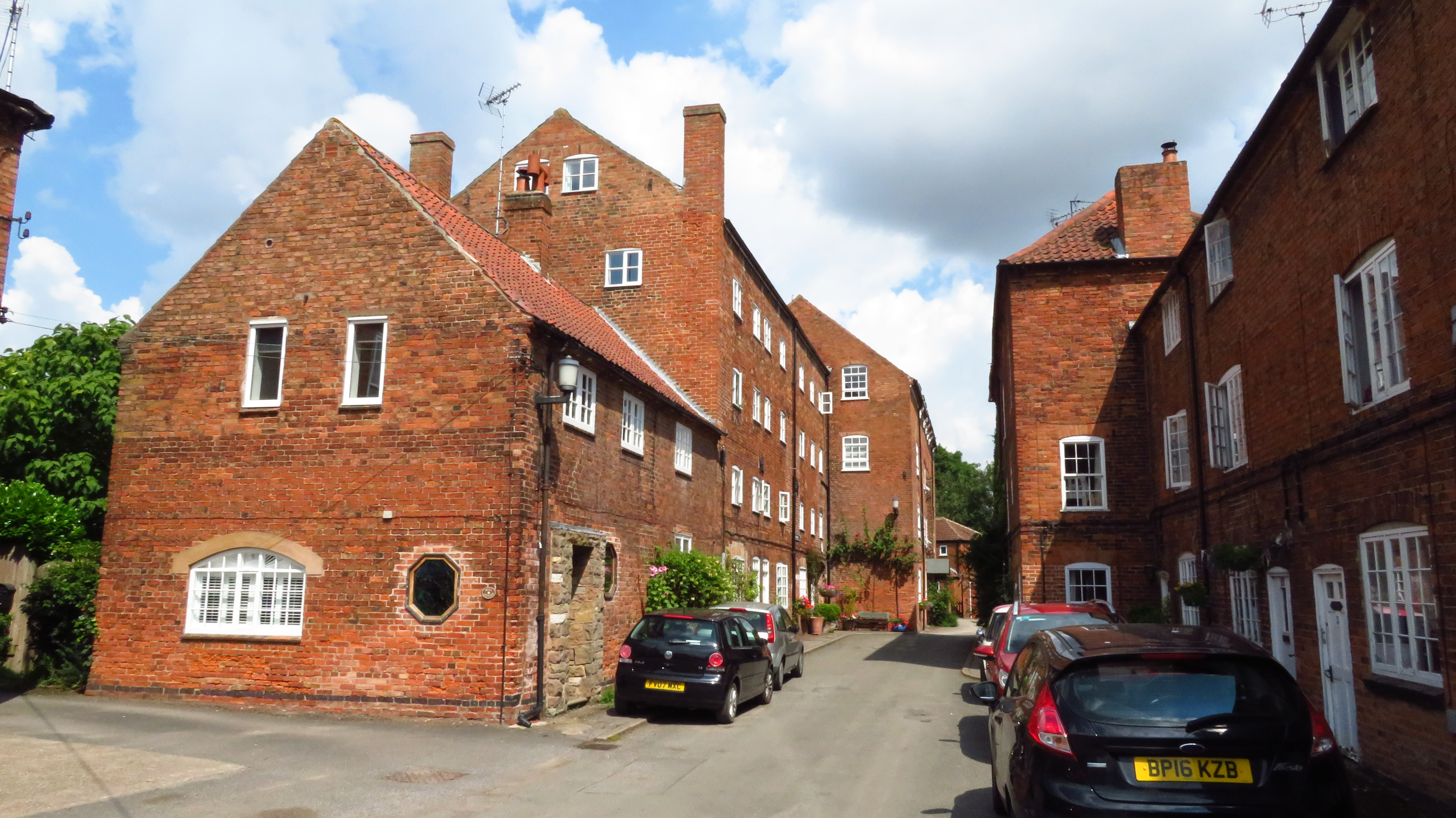
- Maythorne Mill

- Location within Nottinghamshire
- Civil parish: Southwell
- District: Newark and Sherwood
- Shire county: Nottinghamshire
- Region: East Midlands
- Country: England
- Sovereign state: United Kingdom
- Police: Nottinghamshire
- Fire: Nottinghamshire
- Ambulance: East Midlands
- UK Parliament: Newark

Maythorne is a hamlet in Nottinghamshire, England. It is located 1 mile (1.6 km) north-west of Southwell, and is within the Southwell civil parish. The hamlet lies on the Southwell Trail, a multi-use trail linking Southwell with Bilsthorpe along the route of the former Rolleston Junction to Mansfield railway line, and the Robin Hood Way, a waymarked long-distance footpath that links many places with connections to Robin Hood.

The hamlet grew up around a pair of mills on the River Greet, and has a total of seven listed buildings or structures, including both mills, the manager's house, and worker's cottages. The mills were built in 1795 to supply cotton yarn to the framework knitting industry. The firm of Messrs. Bean and Johnson altered it in the early nineteenth century, after which silk thread was produced.

By 1838 there were 70 employees at the mills, and the hamlet included cottages, a general store, a public house and a mission hall. Willow for making baskets was grown in osier beds, and hops were also cultivated. The mills were used as billets for soldiers during the Second World War, by which time their industrial function had ceased.

The mill buildings have subsequently been converted into flats, with some of the outbuildings used as industrial workshops. There is also a caravan park and fishing lake, together with an award-winning gluten-free tea room.
