= William Horsley (cricketer) =

English cricketer

Personal information
- Full name: William Horsley
- Born: 6 June 1835; Southwell, Nottinghamshire, England
- Died: 29 August 1864 (aged 29); Southwell, Nottinghamshire, England
- Batting: Unknown

Domestic team information
- Years: Team
- 1862: Nottinghamshire

Career statistics
Competition	First-class
Matches	2
Runs scored	31
Batting average	15.50
100s/50s	–/–
Top score	16
Balls bowled	–
Wickets	–
Bowling average	–
5 wickets in innings	–
10 wickets in match	–
Best bowling	–
Catches/stumpings	–/–
- Source: Cricinfo, 22 February 2013

William Horsley (6 June 1835 – 29 August 1864) was an English cricketer. Horsley's batting style is unknown. He was born at Southwell, Nottinghamshire.

Horsley made two first-class appearances for Nottinghamshire in 1862, against Cambridgeshire at Fenner's and Surrey at The Oval. He scored 31 runs in his two matches, with a high score of 16.

He died at the town of his birth on 29 August 1864.
