= John Hatfield (cricketer) =

English cricketer

Personal information
- Full name: John Hatfield
- Born: 2 March 1831; Southwell, Nottinghamshire, England
- Died: 5 July 1889 (aged 58); Rugby, Warwickshire, England
- Batting: Unknown

Domestic team information
- Years: Team
- 1854: Nottinghamshire

Career statistics
Competition	First-class
Matches	1
Runs scored	4
Batting average	2.00
100s/50s	–/–
Top score	3
Balls bowled	–
Wickets	–
Bowling average	–
5 wickets in innings	–
10 wickets in match	–
Best bowling	–
Catches/stumpings	1/–
- Source: Cricinfo, 20 May 2012

John Hatfield (2 March 1831 – 5 July 1889) was an English cricketer. Hatfield's batting style is unknown. He was born at Southwell, Nottinghamshire.

Hatfield made a single first-class appearance for Nottinghamshire against Surrey in 1854 at Broadwater Park, Godalming. Surrey won the toss and elected to bat first, making 113 all out in their first-innings. Nottinghamshire responded in their first-innings by making 100 all out, with Hatfield, who opened the batting, scoring 3 runs before he was dismissed by Heathfield Stephenson. Surrey then made 107 all out in their second-innings, leaving Nottinghamshire with a target of 121 for victory. However, Nottinghamshire could only manage to make just 55 all out in their second-innings, during which Hatfield, who had moved down the order to number seven, scored a single run before he was dismissed by Tom Shermam. This was his only major appearance for Nottinghamshire.

He died at Rugby, Warwickshire, on 5 July 1889.
