= Edmund Keating Hyland =

- Born: 1780; Cahir, County Tipperary, Ireland
- Died: 1845 (age 65) Dublin, Ireland
- Genres: Irish traditional music
- Occupation: Piper
- Instrument: uilleann pipes
- Years active: 1799–1845

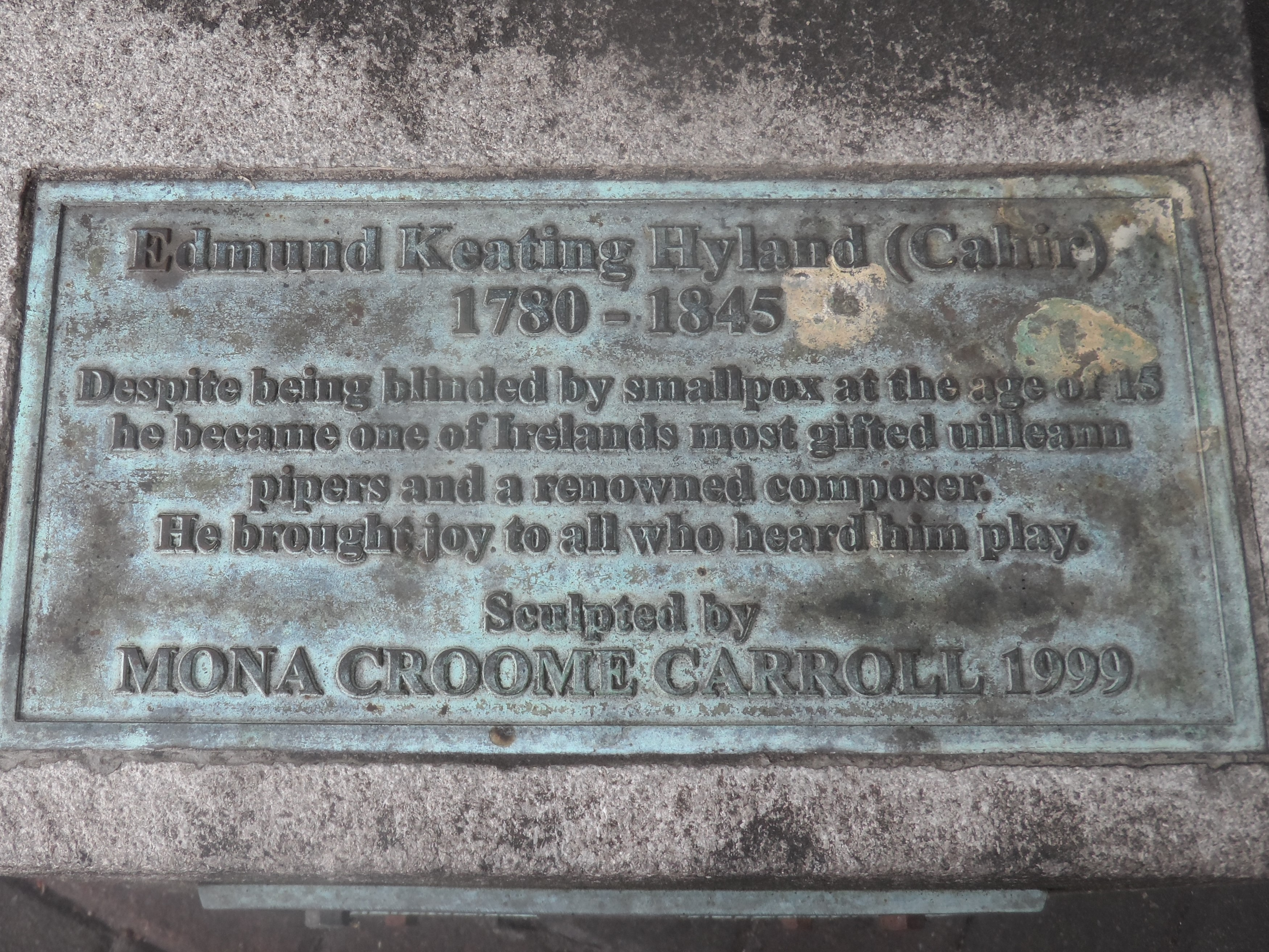
Keating Hyland plaque, Cahir

Edmund Keating Hyland (Irish: Éamonn Céitinn Ó Haoláin; 1780 – 1845) was an Irish uilleann piper of the early 19th century.

== Biography ==
Keating Hyland was born in Cahir around 1780. At 15, he was blinded by smallpox. At 20, he studied music theory under John Andrew Stevenson in Dublin.

He composed the famous jig entitled "The Fox Chase" (based on an earlier eight-bar work, Maidrin Ruadh), and performed it before King George IV in 1821. The king awarded him new pipes worth fifty guineas.

He died in Dublin in 1845, aged 65.

== Commemoration ==
A statue in bronze of Keating Hyland stands in Cahir's main square, sculpted by Mona Croome Carroll and paid for by Lady Margaret Butler-Charteris.
