= John Andrew Stevenson =

Irish composer, knighted 1802

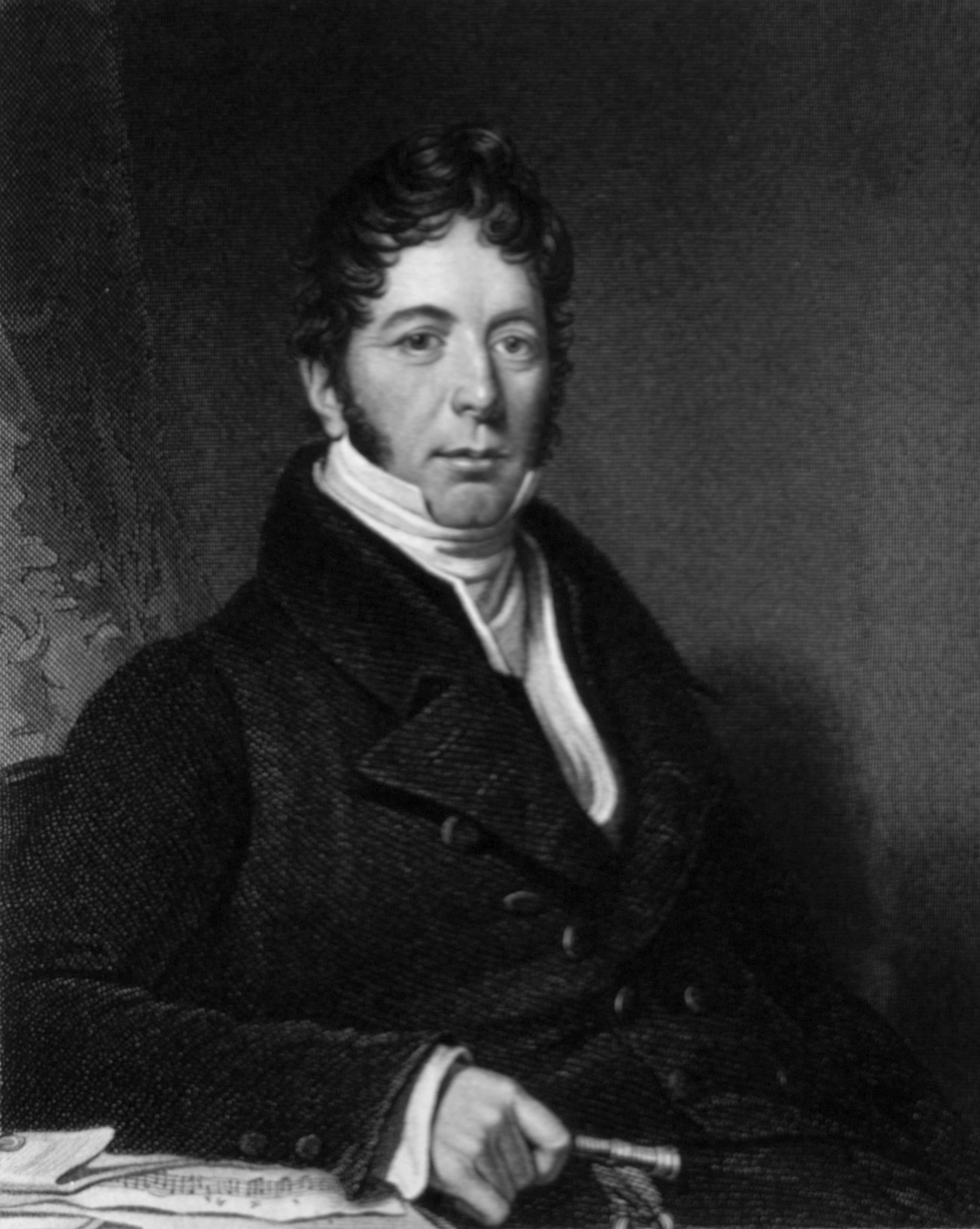
John Stevenson

Sir John Andrew Stevenson (November 1761 – 14 September 1833) was an Irish composer. He is best known for his piano arrangements of Irish Melodies with poet Thomas Moore. He was granted an honorary doctorate by the University of Dublin and was knighted in April 1802.

== Biography ==
Stevenson was born in Crane Lane off Dame Street, Dublin, the son of John Stevenson, a Scottish coach builder and violinist. His parents died when he was young and he was taken in by a Mr. Gibson, of the firm of Gibson and Woffington in Grafton Street, instrument-makers. Despite the fact that he was Irish-born (only English were accepted by Christ Church at that time), Gibson succeeded in getting him received as an indentured choirboy at Christ Church Cathedral, Dublin in 1771, where he was taught to play piano by Richard Woodward and Samuel Murphy.

He was appointed stipendiary at St. Patrick's Cathedral on 20 July 1775 by Dean Craddock and at Christ Church Cathedral in 1781 (despite his nationality, due to the intercession of the wife of the Dean). Appointed vicar choral at St. Patrick's Cathedral in 1783 and at Christ Church Cathedral in 1800. He received the degree of Doctor of Music, honoris causa by the Trinity College, Dublin in 1791. He taught music theory to the uilleann piper Edmund Keating Hyland in 1800.

Stevenson was knighted on 27 April 1803 by Philip Yorke, Earl of Hardwicke, Lord Lieutenant of Ireland. He was appointed the first organist and musical director at the newly erected Chapel Royal of Dublin Castle in 1814.

Stevenson died on 14 September 1833 at Headfort House in Kells, County Meath. In 1843, a marble cenotaph sculpted by Thomas Kirk was erected in the Musicians Corner at Christ Church Cathedral. In the south aisle of St. Patrick's Cathedral, a stained glass window was placed in 1864 in his honour. His daughter Olivia was the wife of Thomas Taylour, 2nd Marquess of Headfort, mother of Lady Olivia FitzPatrick and grandmother of Mary Cornwallis-West.

== Music ==
Stevenson's secular works include operas, sonatas, concertos, symphonies, catches, glees, odes, operas, songs and arrangements of traditional music. He was influenced by Handel, Haydn and Mozart. He was knighted for his composition of the ode You Ladies of our Lovely Isle and a glee with accompaniment Give me the Harp of Epic Song, a translation of the second Ode of Anacreon. He was much renowned for his composition of glees. In 1775 he was awarded the Glee and Catch Club's prize for the glee One Night When All the Village Slept. Other glee and catch compositions include "Alone on the Sea-Beaten Rock", Buds of Roses (which was awarded the gold medal by the Glee and Catch Club in 1813), and the tuneful catch Come Buy my Cherries, popularly known as The Dublin Cries.

Stevenson composed some airs for O'Keeffe's Dead Alive in 1780, which was performed with success in June 1781. Stevenson's songs include, among others, Faithless Emma (written for John Spray), Dearest Ellen, better known from its opening line "When the rosebud of summer", and O Ever Skilled, written before Stevenson received his knighthood. Stevenson composed music for the comic opera Love in a Blaze (after Lafont), which was first performed in Crow Street Theatre, Dublin, on 29 May 1799, and The Patriot, or Hermit of Saxellen (1810). Stevenson's glee They Play'd in Air was performed at the inaugural concert of the Handel and Haydn Society in Boston, Massachusetts, in December 1815.

Stevenson is perhaps best known for his collaboration with Thomas Moore (1779–1852) in several musical works, to which he provided piano accompaniments: the Irish Melodies (ten volumes, 1808–34), The Sacred Melodies (published in periodical numbers, 1808–34), and National Airs (first edition 1815). Differences arose between Moore and Stevenson as may be seen in the correspondence of Moore edited in 1852 by Lord John Russell, and after the seventh number of Irish Melodies the music was provided by Sir Henry Bishop (1786–1855). Despite this, Thomas Moore wrote a memorial poem for Stevenson entitled Silence is in our Festal Halls.

By 1825, Stevenson had composed a large quantity of church music amounting to twenty-six anthems and eight service settings, not to mention chants, double chants, hymns and the oratorio The Thanksgiving, a "pasticcio" from several of his other anthems. In 1825, a selection of his cathedral works was printed in two volumes and published by James Power of The Strand, London, with a dedication to George IV. Three service settings in C, E flat and F, twelve anthems as well as twelve double chants and a set of Responses for Holy Days were selected for publication. Addison issued a reprint of these two volumes some years later, in which each anthem and service was published separately. John Hullah reprinted the concluding chorus The Lord is my Strength from the anthem I am well Pleased in his Singers Library (c.1860), and Joseph Robinson edited three of the twelve together with the unpublished By the Waters of Babylon. Apart from their popularity in Irish collegiate churches and cathedrals in the later nineteenth-century, several of Stevenson's anthems and service settings were in use and in circulation at some English provincial cathedrals such as Bristol, Chester, Chichester, Lichfield, Lincoln, Manchester, and Wells.
