= Dumble =

Wooded valley

Dumble is a dialect word meaning a wooded valley.

Dumble is a dialect word mainly (but not exclusively) confined to the north and east Midlands both as a place-name element and as a lexical item. It seems to contain the Old English dumbel or dymbel, 'hollow; wooded valley; deep cut water course'. The English Dialect Dictionary finds the word in Cheshire, Derbyshire, Nottinghamshire, Leicestershire, Warwickshire (where 'doomble' is also found) and in Shropshire, with the meaning of a wooded valley, a belt of trees along the bed of a small stream; a ravine through which a watercourse runs; sometimes the word appears in the plural.

There are examples close to Lambley and to the south of Southwell both in Nottinghamshire where the clay bedrock plateau made up of Mercia Mudstone is dissected by a number of streams, forming steep sided, wooded valleys. This gives an undulating landscape, locally known as 'The Dumbles'. These areas provide a habitat for Bluebell, yellow archangel, ramsons, dog's mercury and sweet woodruff. To the southwest of Southwell there are two dumbles, Halloughton Dumble and Westhorpe Dumble, streams sufficiently large to be labelled Dumble on the 50,000:1 and 25,000:1 Ordnance Survey maps. On a smaller scale, some areas are known locally as 'The Dumbles', for example; west of Kirkby-in-Ashfield, in Nottinghamshire, at the end of Doles Lane is a small, wooded, deep cut stream valley with banks adorned with Bluebells.

== Etymology ==
- The surname Dumble is believed to be of Norman origin and a corruption of the name Donville, a village in Normandy, brought to England by followers of William the Conqueror who came from there.
