= Vincent Tinley =

English cricketer

Vincent Tinley (26 January 1828 – 19 November 1899) was an English first-class cricketer active 1851–64 who played for Nottinghamshire and Manchester as a wicketkeeper. He was born in Southwell; died in Nottingham.
