= Francis Tinley =

English cricketer (1819–1889)

Francis Eastward Tinley (3 March 1819 – 2 June 1889) was an English first-class cricketer active 1844–56 who played for Nottinghamshire. He was born in Southwell; died in Birmingham.
