= Southwell, Nottinghamshire =

Cathedral town in Nottinghamshire, England

Coordinates: 53.078°N 0.955°W

Southwell
- Town and Civil parish
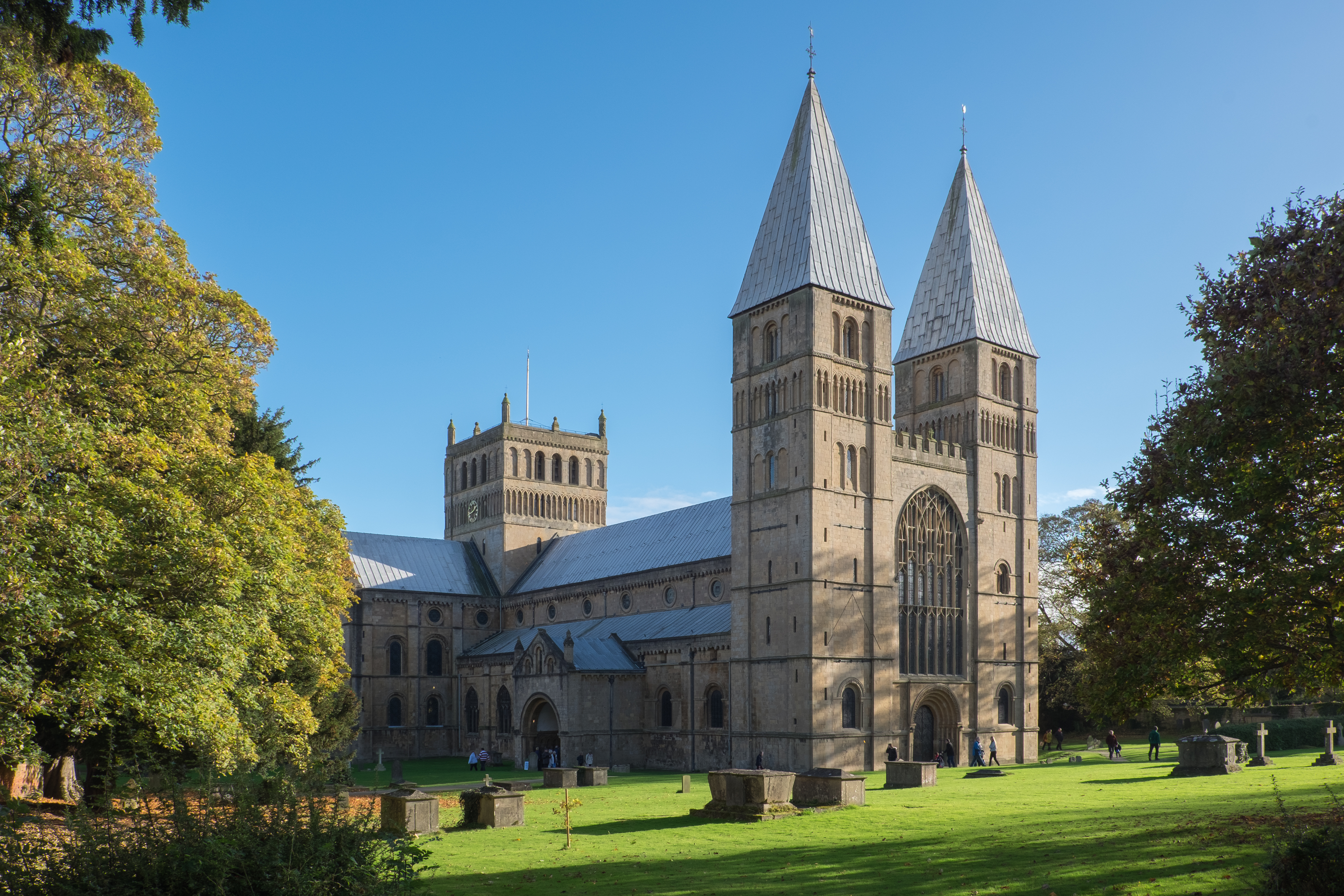
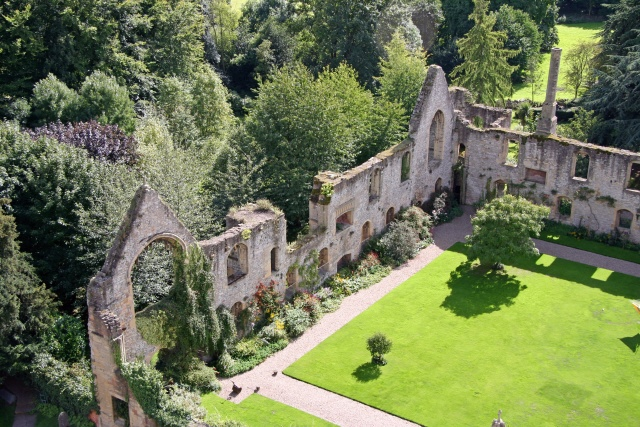
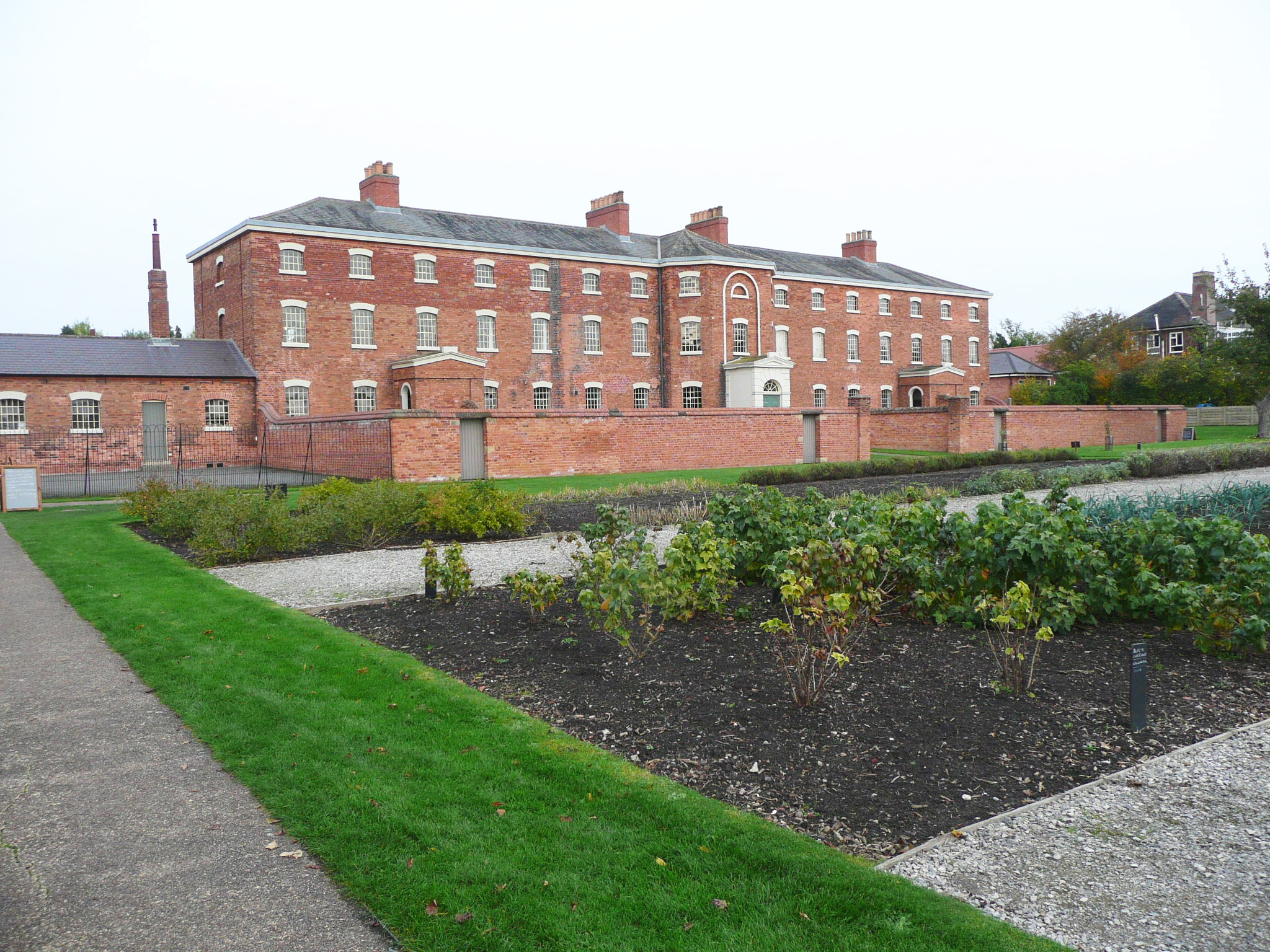
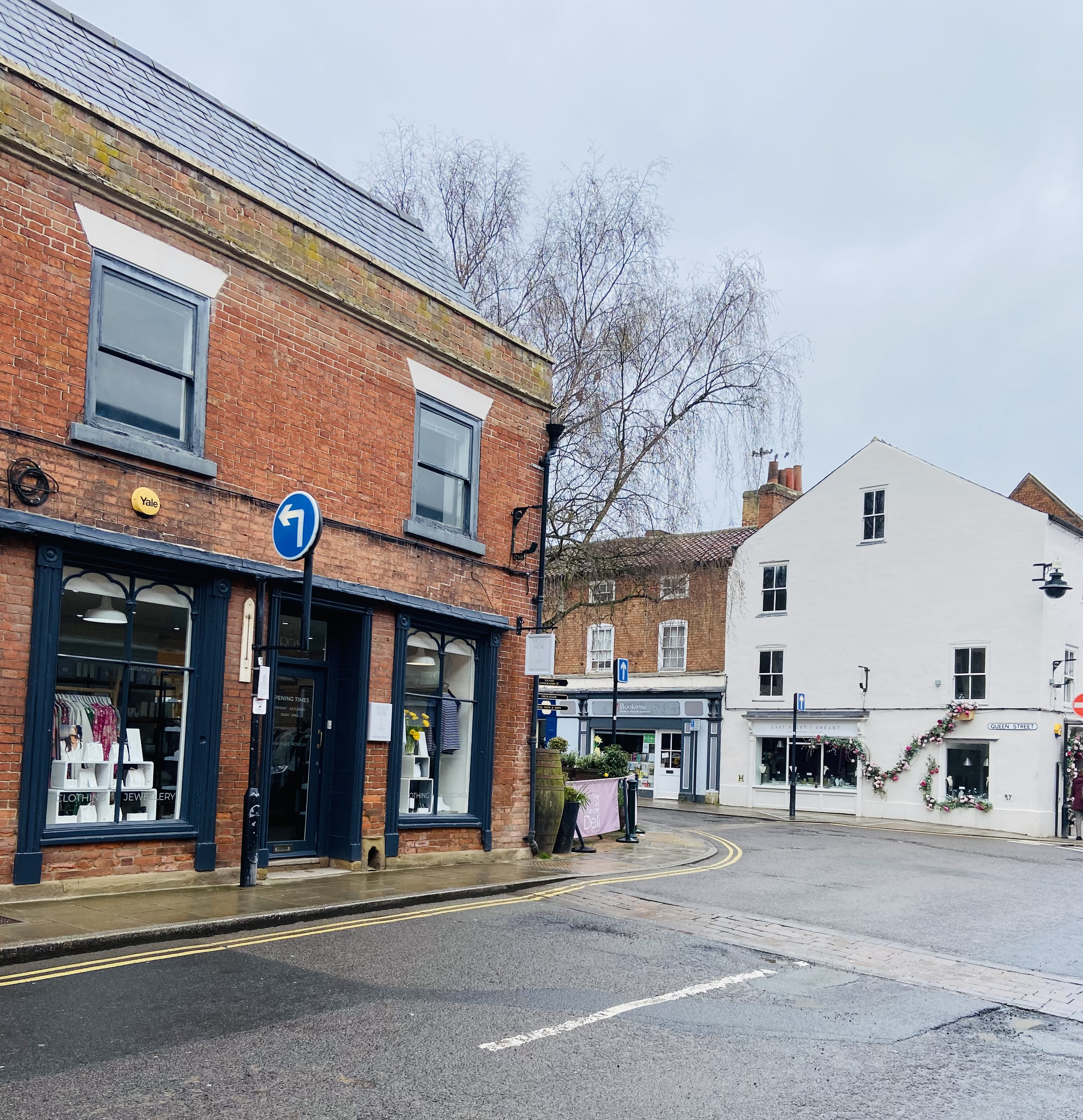
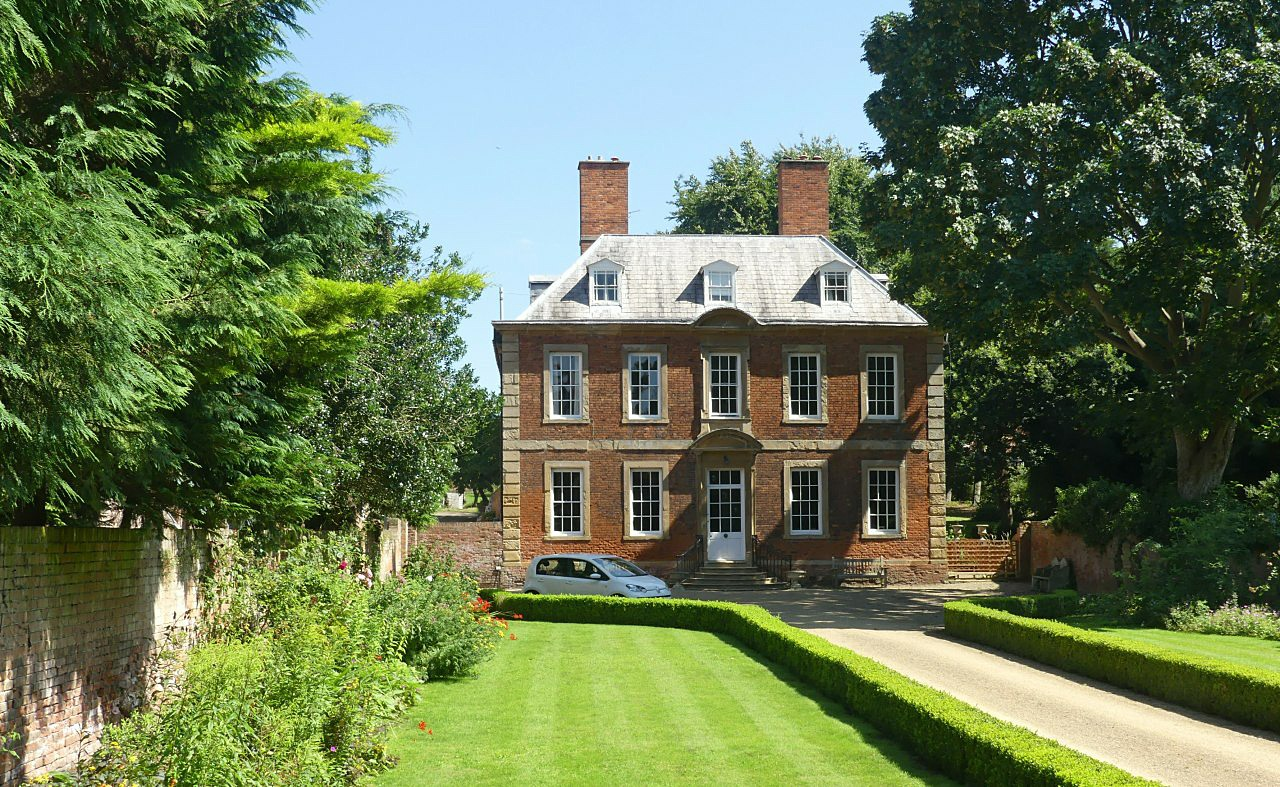
- The Minster Archbishop's Palace The Workhouse King Street Cranfield House

- Location within Nottinghamshire
- Interactive map of Southwell
- Area: 7.70 sq mi (19.9 km^{2})
- Population: 7,491 (2021)
  - Density: 973/sq mi (376/km^{2})
- OS grid reference: SK 69996 53962
  - London: 110 mi (180 km) SSE
- District: Newark and Sherwood
- Shire county: Nottinghamshire
- Region: East Midlands
- Country: England
- Sovereign state: United Kingdom
- Settlements: Southwell, Brinkley, Maythorne, Normanton, NTU Brackenhurst
- Post town: SOUTHWELL
- Postcode district: NG25
- Dialling code: 01636
- Police: Nottinghamshire
- Fire: Nottinghamshire
- Ambulance: East Midlands
- UK Parliament: Newark
- Website: southwellcouncil.com

Southwell (/ˈsaʊθwəl, -wɛl/ SOWTH-wəl, -wel, locally also /ˈsʌðəl/ SUDH-əl) is a minster and market town, and a civil parish, in the district of Newark and Sherwood, in Nottinghamshire, England. It is home to Southwell Minster, a grade-I listed structure and the cathedral of the Anglican Diocese of Southwell and Nottingham. The population of the town was recorded at 7,491 in the 2021 census.

== History ==
=== Toponymy ===
The origin of the name is unclear. Several sites claim to be the original "well", notably at GR SK708535 where a plaque has been placed; in the Admiral Rodney pub; on the south side of the Minster, known as Lady Well in the 19th century; and one by the cloisters called Holy Well. Norwell, 8 miles (13 km) north-east, may support the idea of a pair of "south" and "north" wells, although no wells are known to exist. There was a complex relationship with the two; Norwell being owned by and contributing to the Prebends of Southwell, the place name possibly given to help distinguish this.

In most of Nottinghamshire, Southwell is pronounced "SUH-thull", with a voiced "th" and a silent "w". Southwell's own residents tend to pronounce it as it is spelt.

=== Early history ===
The remains of an opulent Roman villa were excavated beneath the Minster and its churchyard in 1959. Part of a mural from the excavation is displayed in the Minster. It is one of three of its type found in the territories of the Corieltauvi (or Coritani) tribes – along with Scampton in Lincolnshire and Norfolk Street in Leicestershire. A stretch of the Fosse Way runs on the far bank of the River Trent, with evidence of Roman settlement at Ad Pontem ("to the bridge" or "at the bridge"), north-west of the village of East Stoke. There is no clear evidence of a road between Ad Pontem and Southwell. Other evidence of Roman settlement includes the use of Roman bricks in prebendary buildings around the Minster, remains of a ditch or fosse discovered at Burgage Hill in the 19th century, and possibly Roman remains beneath the Church Street site of the recently vacated Minster School.

The Venerable Bede records a multiple baptism in the "flood of the Trent" near "Tiovulginacester" by Paulinus in the presence of Edwin of Northumbria, whom he had converted to Christianity in 627. There is disagreement on the location of Tiovulginacester, but Paulinus certainly visited it and may have founded the first church in Southwell.

Remains of Eadburh, Abbess of Repton and daughter of Ealdwulf of East Anglia were buried in Southwell's Saxon church. Eadburh was appointed Abbess under the patronage of King Wulfhere of Mercia; she appears in the Life of Guthlac and is thought to have died about AD 700. Her remains were buried or translated to Southwell Minster and revered there in the Middle Ages. The only reference is in a Pilgrims Guide to Shrines and Burial Places of the Saints of England supposedly written in 1000: "There resteth St. Eadburh in the Minster of Southwell near the water called the Trent."

Eadwy of England gave land in Southwell to Oskytel, Archbishop of York, in 956; this charter being the first dated reference to Southwell. In 1051 Archbishop Ælfric Puttoc died at Southwell, which indicates that the archiepiscopal residence and church might have been established by then. A tessellated floor and the 11th-century tympanum over a doorway in the north transept are evidence of construction of the Minster after this time. The Domesday Book (1086) gives detail of an archiepiscopal manor in Southwell.

A custom known as the "Gate to Southwell" originated after 1109, when the Archbishop of York, Thomas I, wrote to each Nottinghamshire parish for contributions to building of a new mother church. Annually at Whitsuntide, the resulting "Southwell Pence" were taken to the Minster in a procession from Nottingham, headed by the Mayor and followed by clergy and lay people bound for Southwell's Whitsun Fair. The Pence were paid at the Minster's north porch to the Chapter Clerk. The "gate" in the name of Southwell Gate means "street", as in many East Midland and North-Eastern street names. The custom in its original form persisted well into the 16th century. It was revived in 1981 by the Dolphin Morrismen, but imposition of traffic-management costs forced the organisers to abandon it in 2014. It is survived by the Gate to Southwell Festival, a broad musical event held annually since 2007, except 2020; now held in early July on a site near Southwell and at various venues in the town.

Geoffrey Plantagenet was ordained a priest at Southwell in 1189. On 4 April 1194, Richard I and the King of Scots, William I, were in Southwell, having spent Palm Sunday in Kings Clipstone. King John visited Southwell between 1207 and 1213, ostensibly to hunt in Sherwood Forest, but also on the way to expedition to Wales in 1212.

=== 1300–1800 ===
The Saracen's Head was built in 1463 on land gifted in 1396 by Archbishop Thomas Arundel of York to John and Margaret Fysher. When built, the first floor overhung the roadway in the style of the time.

In 1530, Cardinal Thomas Wolsey stayed at the archbishop's palace in Southwell for a few months. The Cardinal had been arrested after failing to secure an annulment between King Henry VIII and Catherine of Aragon. The Cardinal was ordered to London by Henry Percy, 6th Earl of Northumberland for treason and became ill along the way.

In 1603, King James VI of Scotland passed through Southwell on his way to London to be crowned King James I of England.

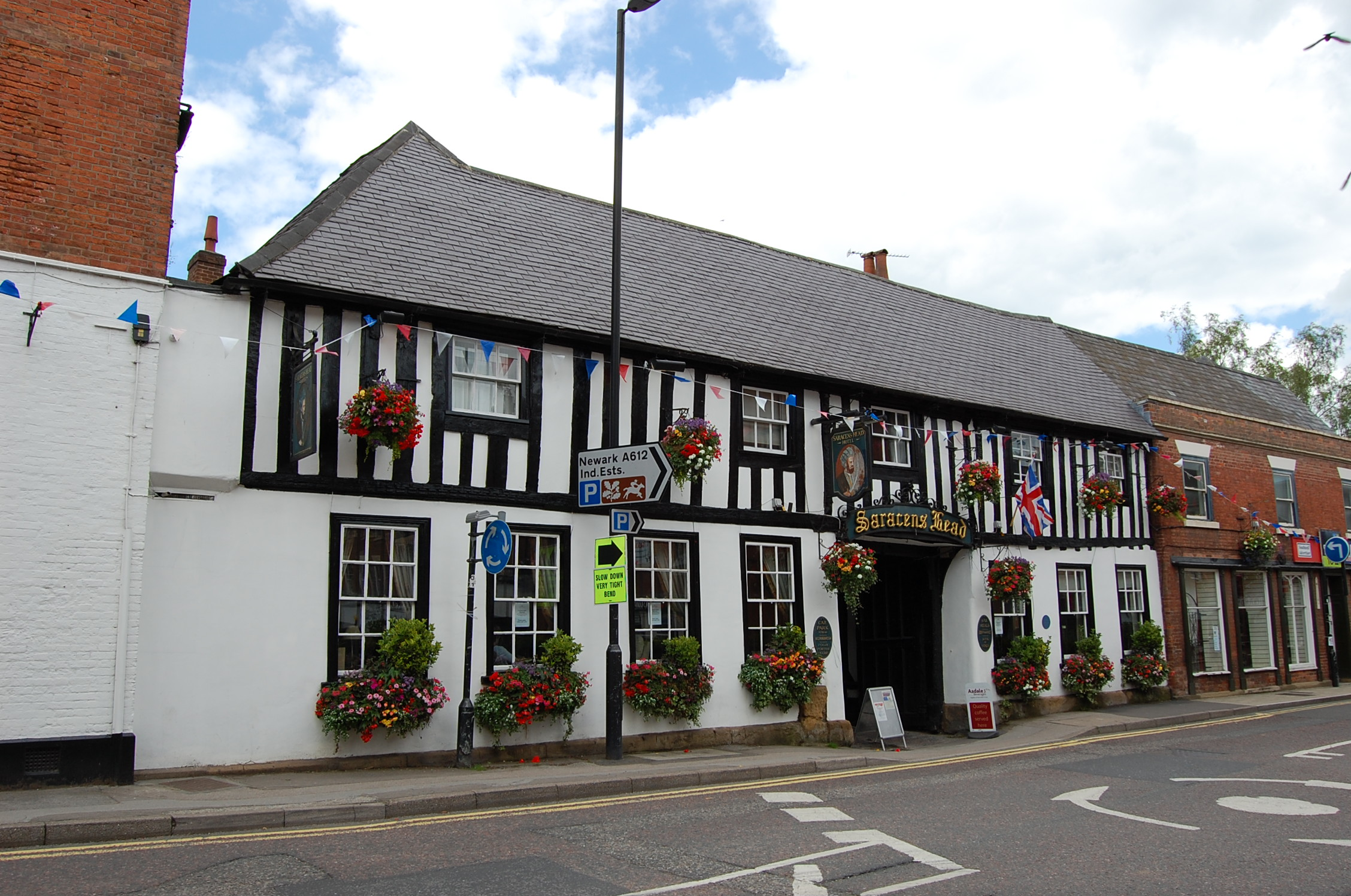
The Saracen’s Head

During the English Civil War, King Charles I spent his last night as a free man in May 1646 in the Saracen's Head (then the King's Head), before surrendering to the Scottish Army stationed at nearby Kelham. The town, the Minster and the Archbishop's Palace suffered under Oliver Cromwell's troops, as they sequestered the palace to stable their horses, broke monuments, and ransacked graves for lead and other valuables. In 1793, there were still iron rings in the walls to secure the horses. By end of the war the Archbishop's Palace was in ruins apart from its Great Hall. It is reputed that Cromwell also stayed at the King's Head.

A bridewell, built on the Burgage in 1656, was enlarged in 1787 to become a county prison. There is evidence that a house of correction was built in 1611, so that the bridewell may itself have been an enlargement.

Mary Ann Brailsford was baptised at Southwell in May 1791 and Matthew Bramley at Balderton in 1796.

=== 19th century and later ===
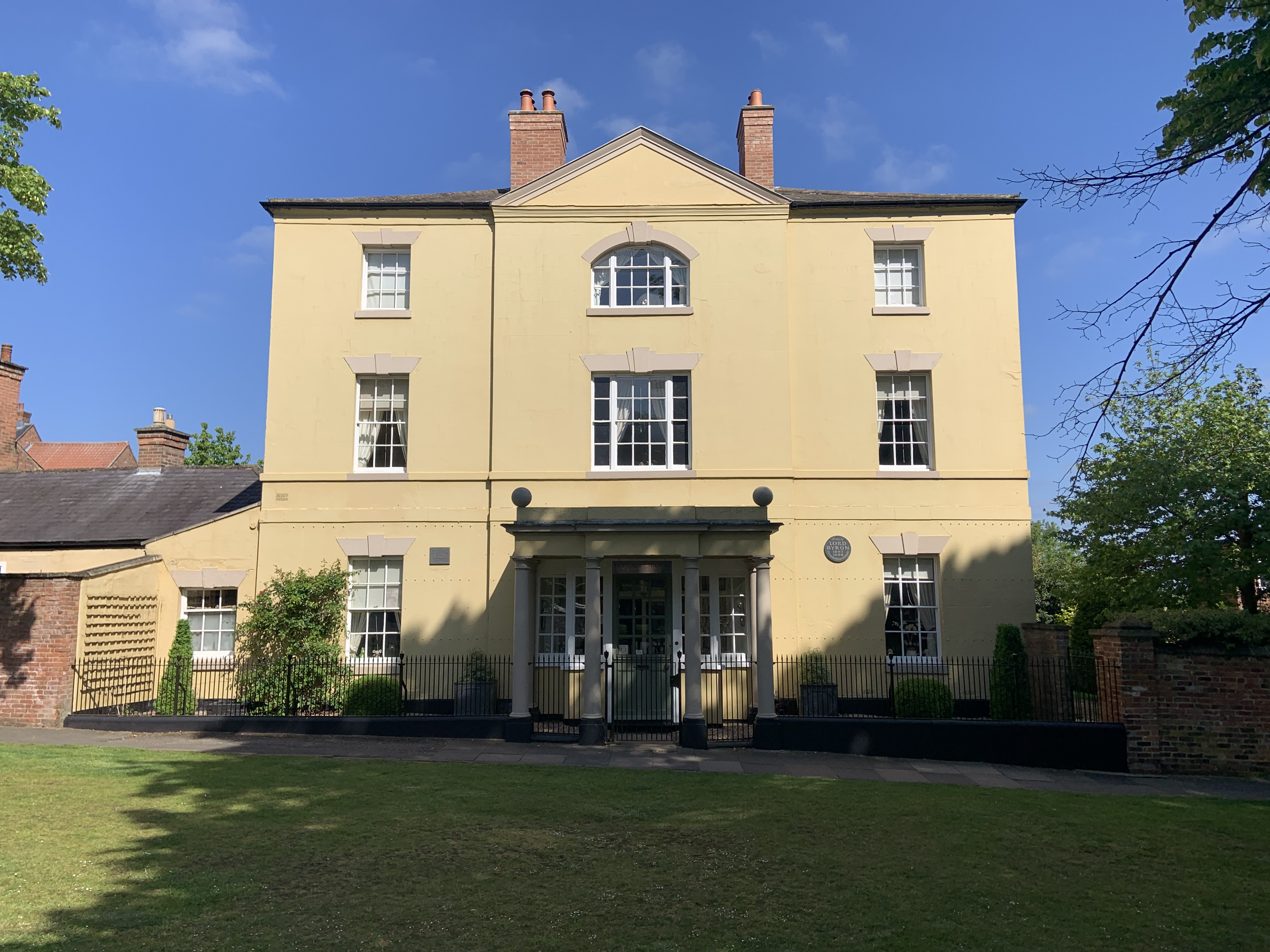
Lord Byron's house, Burgage Manor

By 1801, the population was 2,305. In 1803, Lord Byron stayed with his mother in Burgage Manor during holidays from Harrow and Cambridge; she rented the house. By that time, he had become 6th Baron Byron of Rochdale, but the family home, Newstead Abbey, still required repairs which they could not afford.

Lord Byron wrote a poem in 1807, called Epitaph of John Adams, of Southwell - A Carrier, who Died of Drunkenness; it includes the following reference to the town:

"JOHN ADAMS lies here, of the parish of Southwell, A Carrier who carried his can to his mouth well: He carried so much, and he carried so fast, He could carry no more-so was carried at last; For, the liquor he drank, being too much for one, He could not carry off,--so he's now carri-on."

The Bramley cooking apple was first seeded in Southwell, by Mary Ann Brailsford in 1809. Henry Merryweather, a local nurseryman then 17 years old, saw potential and cultivated it from cuttings. The apple is widely used and renowned for its acidic taste and for cooking into a smooth purée. One local football club, Southwell City, is nicknamed "The Bramleys" and the town's library is called the Bramley Centre. In March 2009, a stained-glass window was placed in Southwell Minister to mark the apple's bicentenary.

The town was late in getting a permanent theatre; this was in the yard of the former Cross Keys. In 1816, two large rooms on the first floor of premises of James Adams, a whitesmith, were converted for use as a theatre. The first company to use it was that of Joseph Smedley.

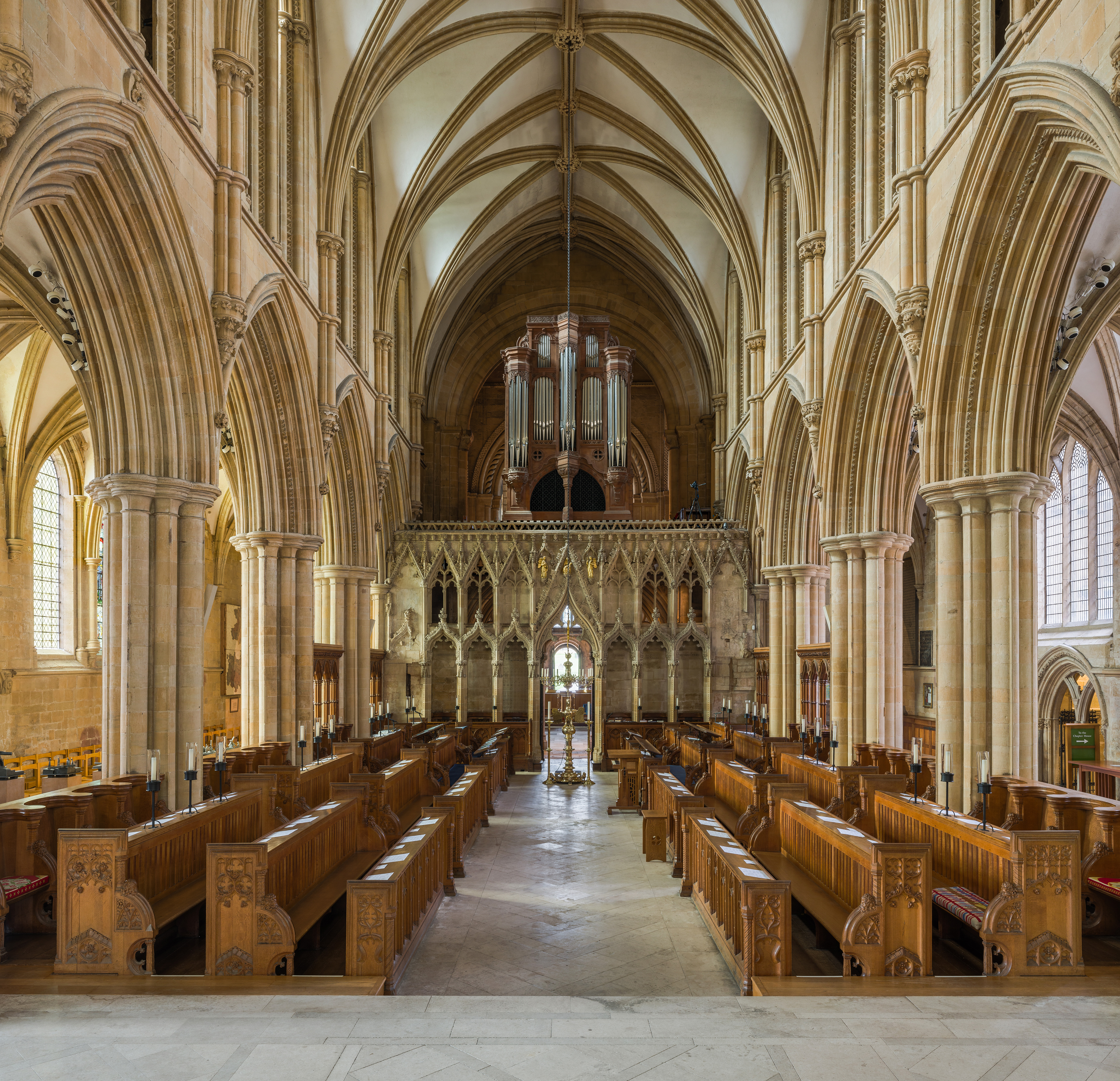
Southwell Minster's interior

The Diocese of Southwell was established in 1884, with Southwell Minster becoming its cathedral church. As established, the diocese included both Nottinghamshire and Derbyshire, but a new Diocese of Derby was formed in 1927 to encompass the part of the Diocese of Southwell in Derbyshire. In 2005, the diocese was renamed the Diocese of Southwell and Nottingham.

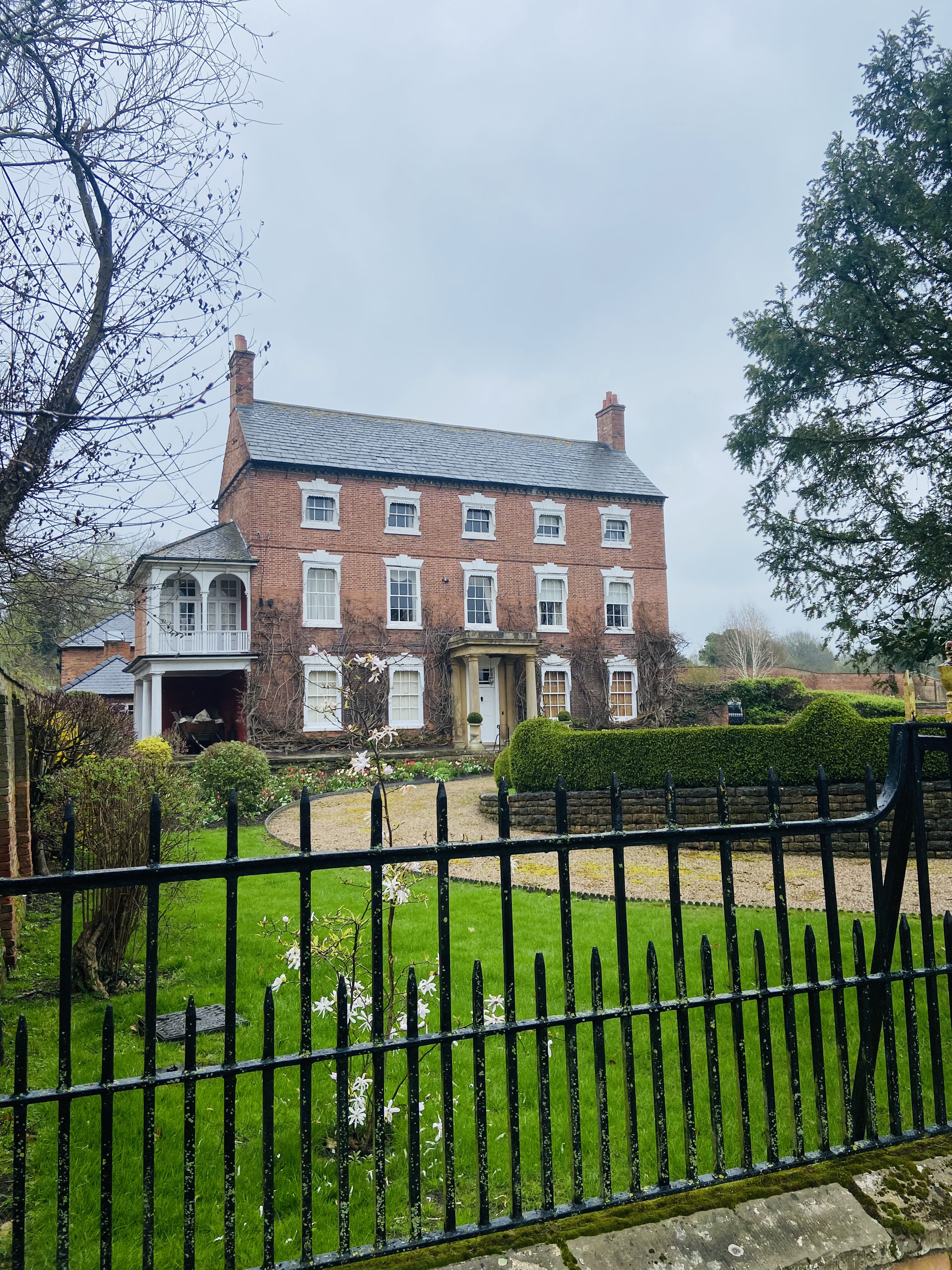
Normanton Prebend

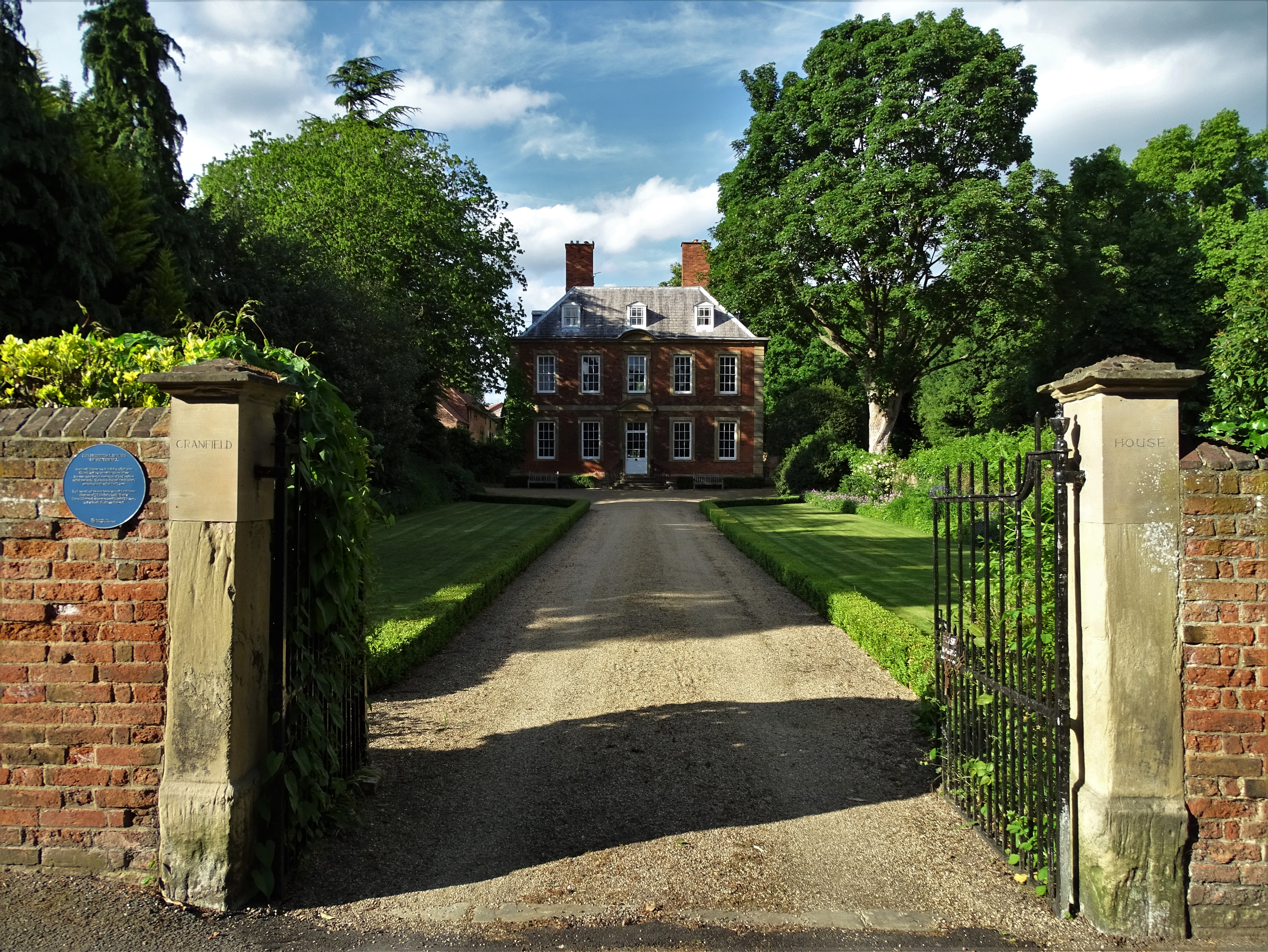
Oxton Prebendal House, now called Cranfield House

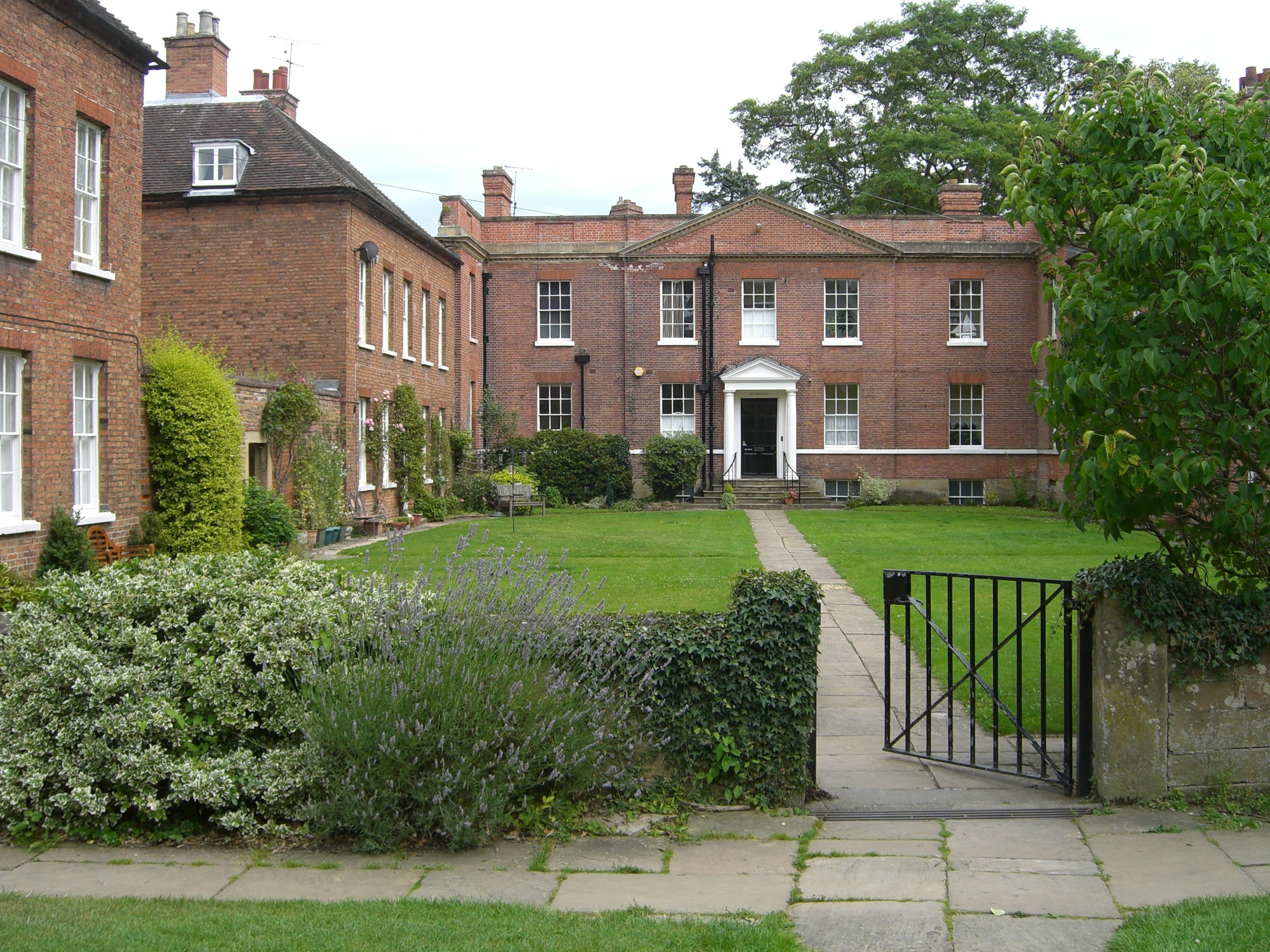
Vicars' Court and the Residence

== Geography ==
=== Location and population ===
The town lies on the River Greet; it is located 9.8 miles (15.8 km) west of Newark-on-Trent, 17 miles (27 km) north-east of Nottingham, 14 miles (23 km) south-east of Mansfield and 25 miles (40 km) south-east of Worksop.

The population of the town was recorded at 7,491 in the 2021 census.

=== Town districts ===
The historic town centre is based around the cathedral area, but nearby outlying communities grew and eventually were subsumed into the town.

- The Prebendage was the heart of Southwell centred on the Minster and the surrounding prebendary properties
- Burgage was north of the cathedral, around Burgage Green, traditionally hosting burgage properties
- Hightown was to the north-west along Westgate, along the main shopping street
- East Thorpe and West Thorpe were hamlets on either side of these areas; St Catherine's Well, at the extremity of West Thorpe, was formerly noted for treating rheumatism.

=== Localities ===
Separated further afield from the core urban area, but within the civil parish are the following places:

- Normanton, a hamlet on the east side of the River Greet positioned around Corkhill Lane; it hosts a sizeable garden centre business
- Maythorne, a hamlet around a listed former silk mill north of the town, alongside the River Greet
- Brackenhurst, an agricultural campus for Nottingham Trent University, lies to the south
- Brinkley is a hamlet to the south-east, along Fiskerton Road.

== Economy ==
The town is something of an oddity in North Nottinghamshire, being visibly affluent compared with neighbouring Newark-on-Trent and Mansfield. Agriculture and coal have seen the fortunes of the other two fluctuate over the years, while Southwell has remained a place where wealthier Nottinghamians like to reside. It appeared in the Sunday Times shortlist of Best Places to Live 2017 for the Midlands region.

As well as shops and services throughout the town centre, other economic sectors include Brackenhurst, an agricultural campus for Nottingham Trent University, while a small industrial estate is to the east of the town.

== Governance ==
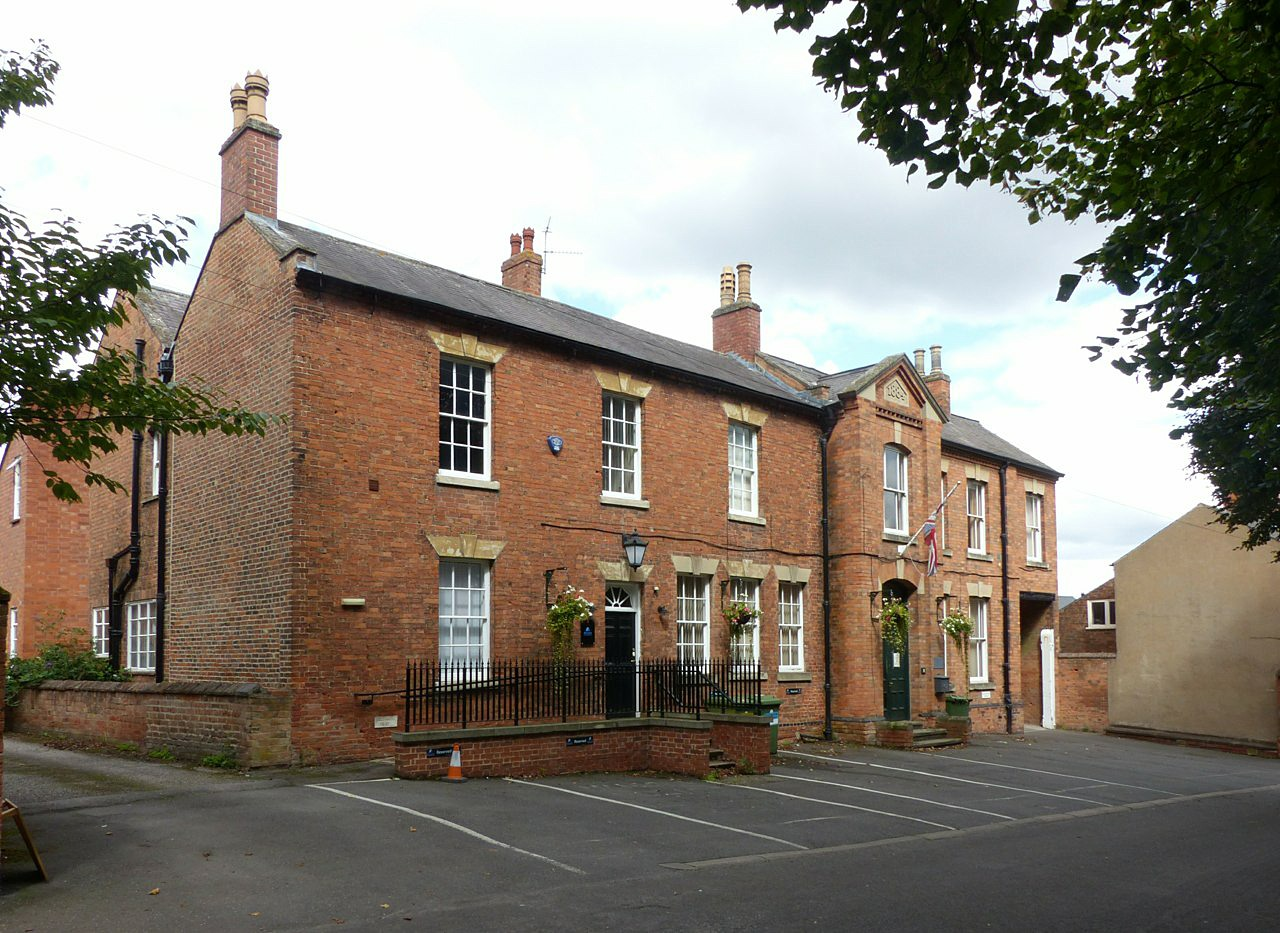
Former Courthouse on Burgage, later used as Police Station and Town Council offices.

As the site of an Anglican cathedral, the town is sometimes mistakenly described as a city and indeed was treated as such in the 1911 Encyclopædia Britannica. However, in 1884 when the diocese was established, the procedure for acquiring city status for new diocesan seats involved the town in question's borough council petitioning the monarch; a petition that at that time was invariably granted. As Southwell was not an incorporated borough and had no borough council to raise the petition, it never gained city status.

Today, Southwell has an active town council, which forms the first tier of local government for the whole of the civil parish of Southwell. The town council, since the 2023 elections, consists of ten Liberal Democrat (LD) councillors, two Conservative (Con) councillors, one Labour and one Independent. The council chair was held in 2019–2021 by Lyn Harris (LD) and since then by Sally Reynolds (Independent) and by Martin Stott (LD) since 2021. The chair of the Town Environment Committee is Lyn Harris, that of the Governance and Finance Committee is Peter Harris and that of the Planning Committee is Jeremy Berridge (all LD).

The second and third tiers of local government in the civil parish are provided by Newark and Sherwood District Council and Nottinghamshire County Council respectively. It is represented as district councillors by Karen Roberts, Peter Harris (both LD) and Penny Rainbow (Con).

Southwell is in the Newark parliamentary constituency represented by Robert Jenrick, MP.

== Education ==
The town's two infant schools (aged 3–5) are Southwell Holy Trinity C of E and Lowes Wong. The latter also teaches children aged 7–11.

Secondary education in the town is provided predominantly by The Minster School, which still educates gifted musicians and choristers of Southwell Minster, is a specialist college for Humanities and Music. It was rated outstanding by Ofsted in 2011/12. It has particularly good GCSE and AS/A-level results compared to others in Nottinghamshire.

Pupils may also choose to attend school at Newark-on-Trent, which is about a 20 minute drive eastwards.

The School of Animal, Rural and Environmental Sciences is part of Nottingham Trent University. It offers further and higher education courses in agricultural-related subjects at its Brackenhurst campus, just outside Southwell.

== Transport ==
=== Roads ===
The town is linked to Newark and Nottingham by a C road, which was formerly designated as the A612, and to north Nottingham and villages to the west by the B6386.

The A617 primary route passes 2 miles (3.2 km) north of the town in Hockerton. Access to the A1 and A46 trunk routes is 7 miles (11 km) away in Newark.

=== Buses ===
Southwell's bus services are operated predominantly by Nottingham City Transport, Stagecoach East Midlands and CT4N.

=== Railway ===
The nearest National Rail station to the town is over 2 miles (3.2 km) away at Fiskerton, which has gained a small car park in recent years to cater for Southwell commuters; Rolleston station is also nearby and lies adjacent to the racecourse. Both stations are on the Nottingham-Lincoln line. East Midlands Railway provides a two-hourly service between Crewe and Newark Castle; direct trains also call at Leicester, Lincoln and Nottingham.

The town was once served by Southwell railway station, which was a stop on the Rolleston Junction-Mansfield line branch line. It was opened in 1847, but closed to passengers in 1959 and to goods traffic in 1964. The station survives as a private residence. The trackbed towards Mansfield now forms the Southwell Trail, a shared-use path; the route to Rolleston Junction is now covered by housing within the town and goes on to form a private access road to Southwell Racecourse.

== Culture ==
=== Landmarks ===
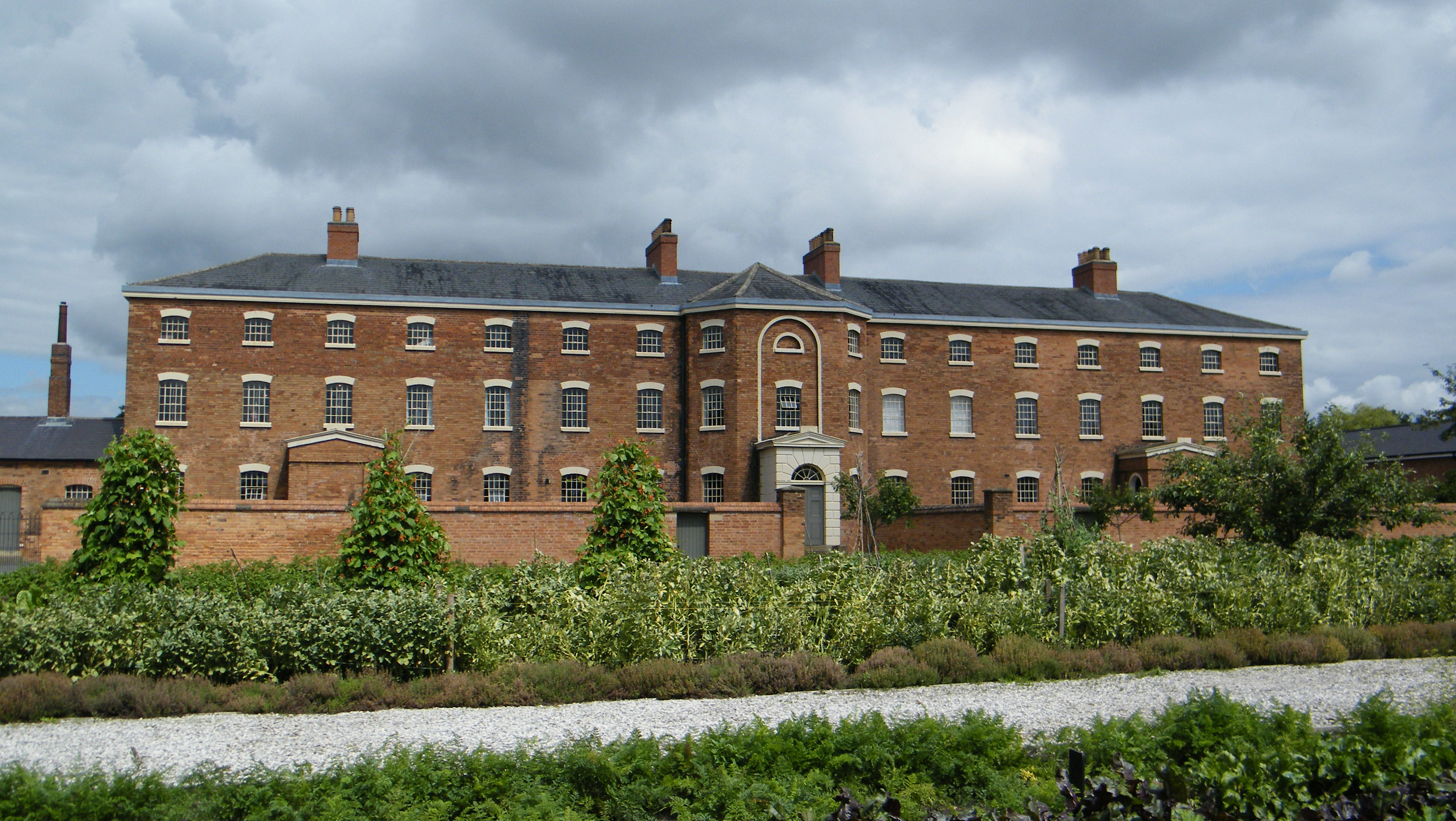
Southwell Workhouse

The principal landmark in Southwell is the grade-I listed Southwell Minster, the cathedral of the Anglican Diocese of Southwell and Nottingham. Behind the Minster is a partly ruined palace, once a residence of the Archbishop of York. It includes the recently restored State Chamber, Cardinal Wolsey's former dining room, and gardens among the ruins.

The town has many other historical buildings, including the prebendal houses in Church Street and Westgate and the Methodist church, which has a right of way beneath it so that the upper floor seats more than the lower. The workhouse (1824) was a prototype for many others. Owned by the National Trust, it shows its appearance in the 19th century.

=== Media ===
The local community newspaper is The Bramley, of which some 11,200 copies a month are delivered free in and around Southwell.

Local news and television programmes are provided by BBC East Midlands and ITV Central. Television signals are received from the Waltham TV transmitter, BBC Yorkshire and Lincolnshire and ITV Yorkshire can also be also received from the Belmont TV transmitter.

Local radio stations are BBC Radio Nottingham, Capital East Midlands and Smooth East Midlands.

=== Festivals ===
The annual Southwell Music Festival is held every August in Southwell Minster and other nearby venues. The Gate to Southwell Festival of roots and acoustic music is held each year in early June.

== Sport ==
Southwell is home to the following clubs:

- Bramley Apple FC was established in 2021 by locals Chris Rice and Jonathan Rice; it plays in the Newark Football Alliance Division 2. It is the last remaining Sunday league side in Southwell
- Southwell Rugby Club, known as the Redmen, was formed in 1922–1923. In the 2011–2012 season, it won a historic treble as RFU Midlands 4 (East) North League Champions, Nottinghamshire Junior Cup winners and Nottinghamshire/Lincolnshire/Derbyshire Plate winners
- Southwell City Football Club, an FA Charter Standard Community Club, involves over 400 local players in 35 teams aged five years to veteran
- Southwell Cricket Club play at Brackenhurst Cricket Ground.

Southwell Racecourse, owned by the Arena Racing Company, is situated on the outskirts of the town near Fiskerton and has an all-weather track. It hosts jump and flat racing.

Southwell has a leisure centre run by a local trust, with trustees from the community; the district council also provides limited support.

== International relations ==
The town is twinned with:

- Sées in France
- Sarzana in Italy
- Český Brod in the Czech Republic.

== Notable people ==
In order of birth:

- St Edburga of Repton was translated from Repton Abbey to Southwell and died here about AD 700
- Ælfric Puttoc (died 1051), Archbishop of York, died here
- Geoffrey Plantagenet, natural son of King Henry II of England and Archbishop of York, was ordained priest here in 1181
- Matthew Sylvester (c. 1636–1708), Nonconformist minister and religious writer, was born here
- Thomas Spofforth (1743–1826), organist, died here.
- John Spray (c. 1768–1827), tenor singer and vicar choral for the Dublin cathedrals, was born here and sang as a boy in the Minster Choir
- Reginald Spofforth (1769–1827), composer and organist, was baptised here
- Mary Ann Brailsford, who grew the first Bramley cooking apple tree from seed, was baptised here in May 1791
- Rev. John Thomas Becher (1770–1848), cleric, social reformer and friend of Lord Byron, was Vicar-General of Southwell Minster in 1818–1840
- Richard Ingleman (1777–1838), architect and surveyor, died here
- Henry Stenton (1815–1887) was a first-class cricketer and Southwell solicitor
- Francis Tinley (1819–1889), first-class cricketer with Nottinghamshire, was born here, as was his first-class cricketing brother Vincent Tinley (1828–1899)
- Chappell Batchelor (1822–1884), organist and first-class cricketer, was born here and sang as a boy in the Minster Choir
- John Hatfield (1831–1889), first-class cricketer, was born here
- William Horsley (1835–1864), first-class cricketer, was born and died here
- Sebastian Smith (1869–1948), a stage and film actor, was born here
- Edmond Foljambe (1890–1960), first-class cricketer, was born here
- Ted Hufton (1892–1967), international footballer, was born here
- Sir Joseph Lockwood (1904–1991), whose company helped to finance The Beatles, was born here
- Bernard William Jewry (1942–2014), singer and actor known by the stage names Shane Fenton and later Alvin Stardust, attended Southwell Minster Collegiate School (now The Minster School)
- Lilian Greenwood (born 1966), Labour MP for Nottingham South, lived in Southwell 1999–2020
- Mathew Horne (born 1978), actor who is best known for his role as Gavin Shipman in the British sitcom Gavin & Stacey, studied at the Minster School
- Robert Jenrick (born 1982), MP for Newark since 2014, rents a property here
- Hayley Turner (born 1983), jockey who attended the Minster School
- Tom Ryder (born 1985), rugby player, attended the Minster School
- Siân Welby (born 1986), television presenter and radio host, attended the Minster School
- Scott Loach (born 1988), league footballer, attended the Minster School and played for Southwell United as a youth.

== See also ==
- Dumble – a local word used to refer to a small wooded area
- Hockerwood – a historic deer park in the area.
