= Brackenhurst Cricket Ground =

Cricket ground in Southwell, Nottinghamshire, England

Coordinates: 53.06480°N 0.96050°W

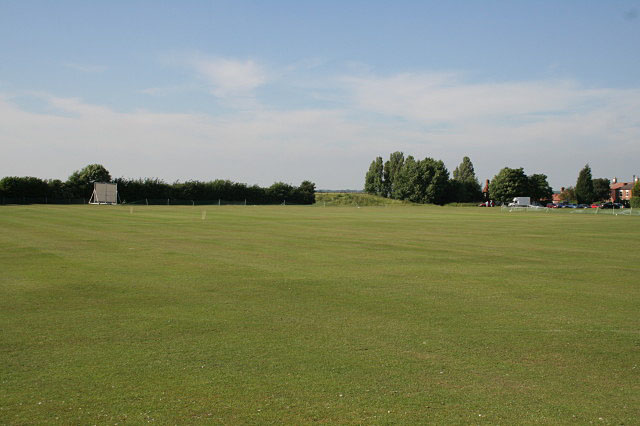

Ground information
- Location: Southwell, Nottinghamshire
- Establishment: 1846 (first recorded match)

Team information
Gentlemen of Southwell	(1846)
- As of 31 August 2010; Source: Ground profile

Brackenhurst Cricket Ground is a cricket ground near Southwell, Nottinghamshire on the east side of the A612 road. The first positive mention of the ground was on the Ordnance Survey map which appeared after the 1830s survey. It was used by the Nottinghamshire Gentlemen as well as by local clubs. In 1846, the Gentlemen of Southwell with Five men given and A. Mynn, played England in what is the ground's only first-class fixture. The ground held six Second XI Championship matches for the Nottinghamshire Second XI between 1967 and 1995, the last of which saw the Nottinghamshire Second XI play the Sussex Second XI.

The ground was bought by Nottinghamshire County Council in 1947 and is today surrounded by Nottingham Trent University Brackenhurst Campus. It is still in use to this day and is the home venue of Southwell Cricket Club, who until 2004 played in the Nottinghamshire Cricket Board Premier League.
