= History of the England cricket team from 1945 =

== 1940s ==
In 1944, an England XI played at Lord's against XIs of the West Indies and Australia, the England XI winning both one-day matches (these were not limited-overs matches). The following year, after the Second World War in Europe had finished in early May, five so-called "Victory Tests" were arranged, against an Australian Services XI which included Keith Miller and Lindsay Hassett. England also played a Dominion team at Lord's.

Test cricket resumed in England after the Second World War with the visit of India in 1946. England won the series 1–0 with a 10-wicket victory in the first Test at Lord's in which Hardstaff scored 205* and Alec Bedser took 11 wickets on debut. Bedser took another 11 in the next test at Old Trafford. This proved to be a false dawn as England, under the aging Wally Hammond, were roundly beaten 3–0 on the 1946–47 Ashes tour as Lindwall and Miller came to the fore. A deluge left England beaten on an unplayable Gabba pitch after Australia had scored 645. England claimed that Bradman had been caught by Ikin off Voce for 28, but the umpire did not agree, and 'The Don' made 187. Hammond batted masterfully for his 32, but Miller took 7 for 60 and then Toshack 6 for 82. Australia won by an innings at Sydney with Bradman and Barnes both scoring 234. England drew at Melbourne, having been set 551 to win, and again at Adelaide, with Compton scoring a century in each innings, as did Morris for Australia. Australia took the final test at Sydney despite Hutton's 122 and Doug Wright's 7 for 105.

England's fortunes recovered with the visit of the South Africans in 1947, a 3–0 series win restoring spirits in a high-scoring rubber. Ken Cranston took four wickets in an over to complete England's victory at Headingley, but the series was dominated by the batting of Denis Compton and Bill Edrich, who put on 370 together at the Oval and 228 at Old Trafford. Compton scored an incredible 1,187 runs in the five tests, and Edrich 869. Alan Melville scored 3 tons for South Africa and Bruce Mitchell two in the Oval test. Set 451 to win by Norman Yarley, the visitors secured the draw, and almost won, with a valiant 423 for 7.

The 1947–48 tour of the West Indies, was a humiliation: an injury-plagued England team were beaten 2–0. Ken Cranston captained England, in the absence of the injured Gubby Allen and George Headley became the first black man to captain the West Indies. England had left Compton, Edrich, Bedser, Wright, Yardley at home; Hutton only joined them in time for the 7th match of the tour. Andy Ganteaume scored 117 in his only test innings at Port of Spain.

Worse was to come as Bradman's 'Invincibles' swept all before them in 1948, dismissing England 4–0 and winning 25, and losing none, of their 34 tour games. England did not help themselves by dropping Len Hutton for the 3rd test. Denis Compton made a stirring 184 at Trent Bridge, withstanding the high pace of Lindwall and Miller in dreadful light. He also scored a brave 145* at Old Trafford after being hit on the forehead by a bouncer and forced to retire hurt. Sid Barnes was also hurt at short leg and taken to hospital. England were bowled out for 52 at the Oval, with the restored Hutton making 32, before Hollies famously bowled Bradman second ball in his final test innings.

George Mann captained England in his first series, just as his father had done, when England beat South Africa 2–0 in 1948–49. England won an exciting opening contest at Durban by two wickets, thanks to Cliff Gladwin's famous scurried leg bye. Denis Compton took his only five wicket haul in tests at Cape Town while Hutton and Washbrook posted a record opening stand of 359 at Johannesburg. Jack Crapp hit 49 to win the last test just before the scheduled close.

New Zealand secured draws in every test of the 1949 series in England with Martin Donnelly, who also played rugby for England, scoring 206 in the Lord's Test and Bert Sutcliffe posting a ton at the Oval.

== 1950s ==
The West Indian tourists of 1950 shocked England with a 3–1 series victory. The strong side, built around the batting of the 3 W's, who scored 20 centuries and 6,000 runs between them on tour, and spin twins Sonny Ramadhin and Alf Valentine, showed the old order of Australian and English dominance was over. Frank Worrell scored 261 at Trent Bridge and 138 at the Oval, Walcott hit 168* at Lords and Everton Weekes made a ton at Trent Bridge. 'Ram' took 26 wickets in the tests, and 135 on tour, with his right-arm mystery bowling and 11 in the historic win at Lords while Valentine's slow left arm accounted for 33 in the tests, and 123 on tour, including 8 for 104 on debut at Old Trafford.

England received another thrashing at the hands of Australia on the 1950-51 tour. Hutton scored a masterful 62* in vain on a Brisbane 'sticky' – England declared at 67 – 7 and reduced Australia to 32 – 7 at one point in return – while Denis Compton had a dreadful time, averaging 7.57 in four matches. Australia won by just 28 runs at Melbourne, and mystery spinner Jack Iverson took 6 for 27 at Sydney where Australia won by an innings. Len Hutton carried his bat for 156 in a losing cause in Adelaide, and England's consolation victory came at Melbourne thanks to Reg Simpson's 156*. Bedser took 30 wickets and Hutton averaged 88.83, but Australia retained the Ashes 4–1. England beat New Zealand 1–0 in the two-test series played on the way home. In a notable display of sportsmanship, Walter Hadlee recalled Cyril Washbrook after he was given out LBW as he had hit the ball.

England beat the 1951 South Africans 3–1 in a series notable for Len Hutton's dismissal 'obstructing the field' in his 100th test innings at the Oval. Eric Rowan scored 236, at the age of 42, for South Africa at Headingley.

England were beaten by India for the first time in a test match at Madras on the 1951/52 tour where Roy and Umrigar scored hundreds and Vinoo Mankad took 12 for 108. England drew the five test series 1–1.

After David Sheppard captained the first two tests in his absence through injury, Len Hutton became the first professional captain of England in 1952, leading his team to a 3–0 thrashing of India, whose batsmen were decidedly less confident against the pace of the debutant Fred Trueman than they had been at home. Trueman took 7 wickets at Headingley, reducing India to 0–4 at the start of their second innings and followed it up with 8 for 31 at Old Trafford. Hutton scored 150 at Lords where Godfrey Evans hit 98 before lunch.

England won back the Ashes 1–0 in 1953, amid scenes of great jubilation at the Oval, where Fred Trueman played his only match in the series. Willie Watson had blocked out Australia at Lord's, and Trevor Bailey everywhere else, and the pair came together in one of the great rearguard actions in England cricket, scoring 109 and 71 respectively. Denis Compton's pull saw England home after Laker (4–75) and Lock (5–45) had bowled Australia out for 162 in their second innings. The side which England fielded in that match – Bailey, May, Graveney, Laker, Lock, Trueman, Edrich, Bedser, Hutton, Compton and Evans with Wardle as 12th man – ranks with any England have ever put on the field of play.

Tony Lock was called for throwing, not without reason, against Barbados on England's 1953/54 tour, which ended honours even at 2 all. The 17-year-old Garry Sobers was facing at the time. More trouble followed as England lost the first two tests and there was more controversy at Georgetown when the crowd rioted after England took a wicket. Hutton, who scored 169 in the game, refused to take his team off the field and England went on to win by 9 wickets. West Indies amassed 681 at Port of Spain, with the three Ws rampant, but England secured a draw and won at Kingston thanks to Hutton's epic 205 and Bailey's 7 for 34.

Denis Compton went on the rampage against Pakistan at Trent Bridge in 1954, making 278 before falling to 16-year-old Khalid Hasan. Nineteen-year-old, 5 foot 3 and a half inch, Hanif Mohammed, scored 1600 runs on the tour. Fazal Mahmood bowled Pakistan to a stunning 24 win at the Oval, with 6 wickets in each innings. Bedser and Bailey had been unwisely rested by England and the series was drawn 1–1.

The Ashes tour of 1954–1955 remains one of the most famous. The situation looked bleak when Australia piled up 601 – 8 at Sydney and won by an innings with Frank Tyson taking 1 for 160 (and Fred Trueman left at home). England won a narrow victory in the second test at Sydney with Johnny Wardle scoring a vital 35 to top score in England's first innings. May and Cowdrey added 116 in the second dig to set Australia 223 and Tyson (6 for 85) and Brian Statham (3 for 45 into the breeze) bowled them out for 184. Hutton's faith in fast bowling was repaid as England went on to win the series 3–1.

England bowled New Zealand out for just 26 at Auckland in March 1955 and won by an innings. Tyson took 2 for 10, Statham 3 for 9, Bob Appleyard 4 for 7 and Wardle 1 for 0. Len Hutton scored 53 at number 5 in what turned out to be his last test.

The score stood at 2 all in the 1955 series against South Africa before England won the fifth test by 92 runs, thanks to Peter May's 85* and Laker and Lock taking 15 wickets between them. Heine took 21 wickets in 4 tests for the tourists.

England defeated Australia 2–1 under new captain Peter May in 1956. The series is remembered for Jim Laker's 9 for 37 and 10 for 53 at Old Trafford. This innings victory secured the series for his team. He took 46 wickets at an average of 9.61.

A tight 2 all series followed on the 1956/57 tour of South Africa. Johnny Wardle, bowling wrist spin as well as orthodox slow left arm, took 12 for 89 to win the Cape Town game where South Africa were dismissed for 72. Russell Endean became the first batsman out 'handled the ball' in Test cricket when he pushed a Jim Laker delivery away from his stumps after padding it away. Captain Peter May scored 1270 runs on the tour – and just 152 in the tests in which Hugh Tayfield took 37 wickets. Peter Richardson scored the slowest test century in 488 minutes in the first match at Johannesburg.

England continued their run with a crushing 3–0 win over the 1957 West Indies, each victory coming in three days. May (285*) and Cowdrey (154) put on a famous 411 at Edgbaston after Ramadhin had taken 7 for 49 in England's first innings. Peter Loader took England's first home hat-trick since 1899 at Headingley. Tom Graveney scored 164 at Trent Bridge after being recalled. Tony Lock took 11 for 48 at the Oval where West Indies were spun out for 89 and 86 on an underprepared pitch.

The 1958 New Zealanders were dispatched 4–0 but Australia finally regained the Ashes with a crushing 4–0 victory on England's ill starred 1958–1959 Ashes tour. The team had been hailed as the strongest ever to leave on an Ashes tour but Richie Benaud's revitalised Australians were too strong. Laker took 15 wickets at 21.2 but Trueman managed 9 in his three appearances and Tony Lock a mere 5 at 75 while the Australians 'bowlers' Meckiff, Rorke, Slater and Burke escaped penalty, if not scrutiny, for their questionable actions. Lindwall, 'last of the straight arm bowlers' passed Grimmet's 216 wickets in his 57th test. A 1–0 in New Zealand was scant consolation.

England thrashed India once again at home in 1959, winning all five tests but were tested against the talented West Indies on the 1959–1960 tour. Sobers made 226 and Frank Worrell 197* at Bridgetown in the first test, the pair batting together for nine and a half hours in all. The second test, at Trinidad, was won by England after rioting in the wake of Charran Singh's run out. Cowdrey made 114 and 97 in Jamaica but the fast bowling of Wes Hall was fearsome in its intensity. Cowdrey took over the captaincy for the last two tests after May was forced home with an abscess.

== 1960s ==
This decade was a difficult one for English cricket. The distinction between amateurs and gentlemen was abandoned in 1963 when the introduction of one day cricket in the County Game helped boost first class cricket but in the Test arena, despite England's strength on paper, Australia held the Ashes for the entire decade.

The controversy over throwing, which had simmered on the Ashes tour, boiled over on South Africa's tour of England in 1960, which also saw small anti apartheid demonstrations. Griffen took South Africa's first test hat trick at Lord's but was later called for throwing by umpire Frank Lee. He was called again in an exhibition match which followed the early finish of the test, and then again for not informing the umpire when he changed to bowling underarm. It was the end of his test career and he didn't play again on the tour. England won the series 3–0 and stretched their undefeated run to 16 games at the Oval when Cowdrey and Pullar put on 290 for the first wicket in the second innings to secure the draw.

Ted Dexter (180) and Raman Subba Row (112 on debut) saved England at Edgbaston against the 1961 Australians while Garth McKenzie made his test debut at Lord's and took 5 for 37 in the second innings. The emergence of the Lord's 'ridge' meant that Australia struggled against the pace of Fred Trueman to make the 69 they needed to win after Bill Lawry's first innings century had given them the advantage. Fred Trueman took 11 wickets at Headingley, including a spell of 5 for 0 bowling cutters, squaring the series for England, but Bill Lawry, who scored over 2,000 runs on his first tour of England, ground out another ton at Old Trafford and Benaud's 6 for 70 took the series 2–1. Benaud famously bowled Peter May around his legs for a duck.

England lost 2–0 against India on the 1961-62 tour of the sub continent but beat Pakistan 1–0, with the newly pugnacious Bob Barber (86) and Geoff Pullar (165) posting 198 for the first wicket at Dacca. Peter Parfitt scored 3 hundreds in four tests against the Pakistan tourists in 1962 as England thrashed the tourists in each test with Cowdrey, Dexter and Graveney all scoring heavily and the fast bowlers in command.

The 1962–1963 Ashes tour was something of a disappointment both in terms of entertainment and result, although Colin Cowdrey passed Frank Woolley's 305* in scoring 307 against South Australia at Adelaide. Captain Ted Dexter's 99 helped England secure a draw in the first Test at Adelaide where Brian Statham overhauled Alec Bedser's test wicket taking record of 236. England won the second at Melbourne with David Shepherd scoring 113. John Murray, nursing a shoulder injury, batted 100 minutes for 3 not out, and Fred Titmus took 7 for 79 in the Sydney match, but Australia won by 8 wickets. Don Bradman came out of retirement, at the age of 54 for the Prime Minister's XI against M.C.C. at Canberra but was bowled by Statham for just 4. Australia drew the last test at Sydney, despite Ken Barrington's 101 and 94, and retained the Ashes 1–1. England dismissed New Zealand 3–0 on the second leg of the tour, with Alan Smith and Colin Cowdrey putting on a world-record stand for the 9th wicket in Wellington.

Frank Worrell's West Indies hammered England 3–1 in 1963. An innings defeat at Old Trafford was followed by the dramatic match at Lord's when Colin Cowdrey, his arm broken by Wes Hall, returned to the non strikers end as David Allen faced the last two balls of the game with 6 needed to win. Brian Close, with a charging 70 had taken England to the brink of victory after Dexter's dashing 70 in the first innings against the fearsome pace of Hall and Charlie Griffith with Fred Trueman taking 11 for 152. Trueman took 12 for 119 at Edgbaston to give England their only win of the series but Sober's 102 at Headingley and the bowling of Gibbs and Griffith was too much for England, who also failed to defend 253 at the Oval.

England's tour of India in 1963–1964 saw 5 high-scoring draws. R.G. Nadkarni bowled 131 balls without conceding a run in the Test at Madras, and headed the batting averages with 98. India scored 7 centuries to England's 4 but Fred Titmus took 27 wickets.

The 1964 Australians retained the Ashes once again with a 1–0 win. Wally Grout sportingly refused to run out Fred Titmus after he was accidentally knocked over by bowler Neil Hawke and left stranded at Trent Bridge, where Geoff Boycott made his debut. Rain spoiled the game, as it did at Lord's where John Edrich scored 120 in his first Ashes innings. Australia took the test, and the series, at Headingley where Burge belted 160 and Fred Titmus took 6 for 94 off 77 overs. Dexter took him off with Australian 187 for 7 and the Australians doubled their score against the new ball, going on to win by 7 wickets. Bob Simpson and Bill Lawry put on 201 for the first wicket and Simpson went on to post 311. Simpson escaped a 'close' run out decision early on. England saved the game with 256 from Ken Barrington, his 10th test century but his first at home. Most famously Fred Trueman took his 300th wicket in his 65th test, Hawke was the first to congratulate him after being caught by Colin Cowdrey.

England played well in their next two series, defeating South Africa 1–0 on the 1964–1965 tour, the last they made before South Africa's isolation. England won at Durban, thanks to centuries from Barrington and Parks, and drew the other four. John Edrich scored 310* at Headingley against New Zealand in 1965, hitting a record 57 boundaries. Edrich put on 369 with Ken Barrington (163) who had been dropped after the Edgbaston test for taking 437 minutes to score 137. He failed to score in twenty overs at one point. John Snow made his debut for England who won the series 3–0. It was the first summer of 'twin tours' and South Africa proved sterner opposition, winning at Trent Bridge by 94 runs. The superb Graeme Pollock scored 125 off 145 balls and brother Peter Pollock took 10 for 87. England were frustrated by the weather at the Oval, where they made a desperate attempt to square the series. Colin Bland, a fine batsman as well as brilliant fielder, made a century and England finished on 308 for 4. It was only the second series win for South Africa in what was the last Test played between the two countries until the end of apartheid.

There were 7 totals over 400 in the 1965/66 Ashes, four by Australia for whom Bill Lawry was a fixture. Bob Barber made a brilliant 185 at Sydney, putting on 234 with Geoff Boycott. John Edrich scored 2 hundreds for England in the series while Bob Cowper scored 307* in 727 minutes for Australia in the final test at Melbourne. Doug Walters scored 155 and 115 in his first two matches. The 1–1 Ashes draw was followed by 3 more drawn tests in New Zealand.

The genius of Garry Sobers was in full bloom on the West Indies 1966 tour of England. He scored 161, 163*, 94 and 174 to set up 3 test wins and save the Lord's test against all the odds when he put on 274 with cousin David Holford after the West Indies had been reduced to 90–5. Colin Milburn scored a thrilling 94 on debut then 126 at Lords but his career was tragically curtailed by a car accident in which he lost an eye. Ken Barrington was given a thorough working over by Wes Hall and Charlie Griffith and was left out after two matches when the strain got too much. Derek Underwood was hit in the teeth by Charlie Griffith when the West Indies needed just one wicket to win. Basil Butcher scored 209 at Trent Bridge. Cowdrey was replaced by the battling Brian Close as captain at the Oval and the indefatigable Yorkshireman led his team from the front to an innings victory. Graveney (165), Ken Higgs (63) and John Snow (59*) put on 361 for England's last three wickets in their first innings.

India lost all three tests in the first half of 1967 when Geoff Boycott was famously dropped for scoring too slowly in his 246* at Headingley. Pakistan were beaten 2–0, with Ken Barrington scoring a hundred in each of the three tests. Although England won the match, Pakistan played brilliantly at the Oval where Asif Iqbal made a dazzling 146.

England eked out a rare series victory against the West Indies on the 1967–1968 tour, thanks to Garry Sobers' inviting declaration. Ken Barrington made 143 in the opening test at Port of Spain, his fourth in four tests, as did John Edrich, while rioting disrupted the Sabina Park match after Basil Butcher was given run out. Cowdrey was back as England captain after Brian Close had characteristically refused to apologise after a time wasting incident in a county match at Edgbaston. Fred Titmus lost 4 toes in a boating accident before the 3rd test.

The 1968 Ashes series was once again a 1–1 draw, with much attention paid to Australian mystery spinner Johnny Gleeson. Lawry's Australians won the first test at Old Trafford but were rolled for 78 at Lord's where Milburn scored a rollicking 83. Wintry conditions – the ground was white with hail on the first day – allowed the Australians to escape. Cowdrey scored a hundred when he became the first test player to play 100 matches. England won the Oval test after volunteers from the crowd helped clear the puddles after a storm, and Australia, 85 for 5 when the rain came at lunch, were bowled out by Derek Underwood who took 7 for 50.

Having scored 158 in the Oval Test, Basil D'Oliveira was controversially left out of the tour party to South Africa. Tom Cartwright withdrew with injury and South African Prime Minister John Vorster objected to D'Oliveira replacing him. M.C.C. cancelled the tour and journeyed instead to Pakistan, which proved to be a difficult tour. Draws at Lahore and Dacca were followed by riots in Karachi where Milburn, Graveney and Knott all scored centuries. The test and the tour were abandoned.

England ended the decade on a high, defeating both the fading West Indies and New Zealand 2–0 at home in 1969. John Hampshire scored a debut century at Lords against the West Indies but it proved a false dawn in his test career. Ray Illingworth became a surprise, but wise, choice as England captain after Colin Cowdrey suffered an achilles injury. Glenn Turner, in his original incarnation as a blocker, carried his bat for 43 in New Zealand's 131 at Lord's.

== 1970s ==
The cancellation of the proposed South Africa tour in 1970 led to the arrangement of a 5 test series against a powerful 'The Rest of the World' team. The matches were awarded Test status at the time but this was controversially revoked.

Spearheaded by fast bowler John Snow, England regained the Ashes with two victories in Sydney under the canny captaincy of Ray Illingworth in a seven test series. A 1–0 series victory at home against Pakistan was followed by a surprise defeat against India but, after a rare winter off, the Ashes were again retained at home 2–2 in 1972. England toured India under Tony Lewis in 1972–73 and lost the series 2–1, with the Indian spin bowlers at their peak, before grinding out 3 draws in Pakistan.

After defeating New Zealand 2–0 in the first test series of the summer a capable West Indies side, featuring Garry Sobers on his last tour, defeated England 2–0. England claimed an honourable 1–1 draw in the tour of the West Indies which followed in 1973–74 and beat India in all three tests at home in 1974 before drawing three tests against a flamboyant Pakistan team in the latter half of the summer.

The Ashes were lost in a tour in 1974–75 under Mike Denness as England, without Geoff Boycott, were defeated 4–1 by the pace of Dennis Lillee and Jeff Thomson. England reached the semi-final of the first World Cup in 1975 before losing to Australia and lost the following four test Ashes series 1–0. Another winter without a tour was followed by a heavy defeat under Tony Greig against a rampant West Indies. Clive Lloyd's men began their 15-year dominance of world cricket thanks to a pace attack led by Andy Roberts, Michael Holding and Wayne Daniel and the batting of Viv Richards stirred by Greig's unfortunate 'grovel' gaffe.

England recovered to post a famous 3–1 win over India, thanks to their own fast bowlers, in 1976–77 and fought bravely in the Centenary Test of 1977, thanks to Derek Randall's superb 174, before losing by 45 runs, the same result as the first Test played one hundred years before. The breaking news of the Packer schism of World Series Cricket led to Grieg's removal as captain and the appointment of Mike Brearley as captain for the 1977 Ashes. A divided Australian team were defeated 3–1 in a series famous for Geoff Boycott's return and 100th century at Headingley and Ian Botham's debut.

Draws against New Zealand and Pakistan on tour in 1977–78 were followed by the destruction of New Zealand and a Pakistan team shorn of its Packer stars in 1978. With David Gower making his debut, Ian Botham and Bob Willis at their peak with the ball and Geoff Boycott and Graham Gooch opening the batting England were a formidable outfit. A 5–1 victory against a weak Australian team in 1978–79, thanks to the determined batting of Derek Randall and a strong bowling side, was followed by a 1–0 victory at home over India and a World Cup final appearance against the West Indies. Viv Richards and Collis King thumped the English attack around Lord's before Joel Garner blew the England middle order away. With the Packer rift healed England agreed to a three test series in Australia, which they lost, but retained the Ashes as they had only agreed to the tour if they were not for stake.

== 1980s ==
Ian Botham took over the captaincy but was unfortunate to face the mighty West Indies side of the time in his first ten matches in charge. A fighting performance at home in 1980, in which they managed to draw 4 of the 5 tests and almost won at Trent Bridge, was followed by a crushing 'blackwash' in the West Indies in 1980/81 and, after a pair at Lord's in the first Test against Australia, in 1981, Botham lost the captaincy. Mike Brearley took over once again and a revitalised Botham tore through the Australians with bat and ball to bring exciting victories at Headingley, Edgbaston and Old Trafford. At Headingley, England won by 18 runs after following-on, only the second time in the history of England v Australia Tests that this has been achieved.

Keith Fletcher took over and lost a desperately dull series in India 1–0 in 1981/82, thanks to turgid pitches and dreadful over rates from both teams, but thanks largely to Ian Botham won a one-off test in Sri Lanka on the way home. Bob Willis was appointed captain for the 1–0 victory over India and the 2–1 win over Pakistan in 1982, but the Ashes were lost 2–1 on the 1982/3 tour, despite a thrilling 3-run win in Melbourne.

The 1983 World Cup was held in England, for the third time. They lost in the semi-finals to India, who then won the final. England defeated New Zealand 3–1 in the tests which followed but struggled on the 1983/4 tour to New Zealand and Pakistan, losing both rubbers 1–0. The West Indies, at its absolute peak, destroyed England 5–0 in 1984, to no-one's great surprise, and Sri Lanka drew their lone test at the end of the summer.

David Gower led England to a 2–1 victory in India on the 1984/5 tour and the Australians were crushed by an overwhelming England batting display at home in England in 1985 with Gower, Tim Robinson and Richard Ellison among the stars. Hopes that this improvement could see a challenge mounted on the 1985/6 tour of the West Indies were dashed as England were pummelled to defeat by fast bowling. A surprised England went down to India 2–0 at home before beating New Zealand 1–0 but there were few hopes of retaining the Ashes on the 1986–87 tour. Famously described by the journalist Martin Johnson as the team that 'can't bat, can't bowl and can't field' Mike Gatting's men regrouped and swept all before them and dominated the series, winning 2–1.

A Pakistan team, boasting the talents of Javed Miandad, Abdul Qadir and Imran Khan beat England 1–0 home and away in 1987 and 1987/88 and a draw in the 'return' Centenary Test in Australia was followed by a 0–0 draw in three tests against a New Zealand side spearheaded by Martin Crowe and Richard Hadlee. The first World Cup to be held abroad (and also the first to be contested with 50 over games, not 60) in 1987 saw England lose to Australia by 7 runs, in a huge final.

England were battered by the West Indies once again at home in 1988, although the blackwash was averted in a 4–0 defeat. A succession of England batsman were injured at the crease and a victory against Sri Lanka at the end of the summer did little to heal the bruising England had received. Unusually there was no tour that winter, with political troubles raising their ugly head and the proposed Indian trip being cancelled, but England's respite was short lived as Allan Border's Australians heralded the dawn of a new age of antipodean dominance as they trounced England 4–0 in 1989. The Ashes were not to be regained for another long 16 years. A South African rebel tour was announced even before the series ended with Graham Gooch and others being banned for their part for three years. A new look team of 'young lions' fared better than in previous tours in a 2–1 defeat in the West Indies in 1989/90.

== 1990s ==
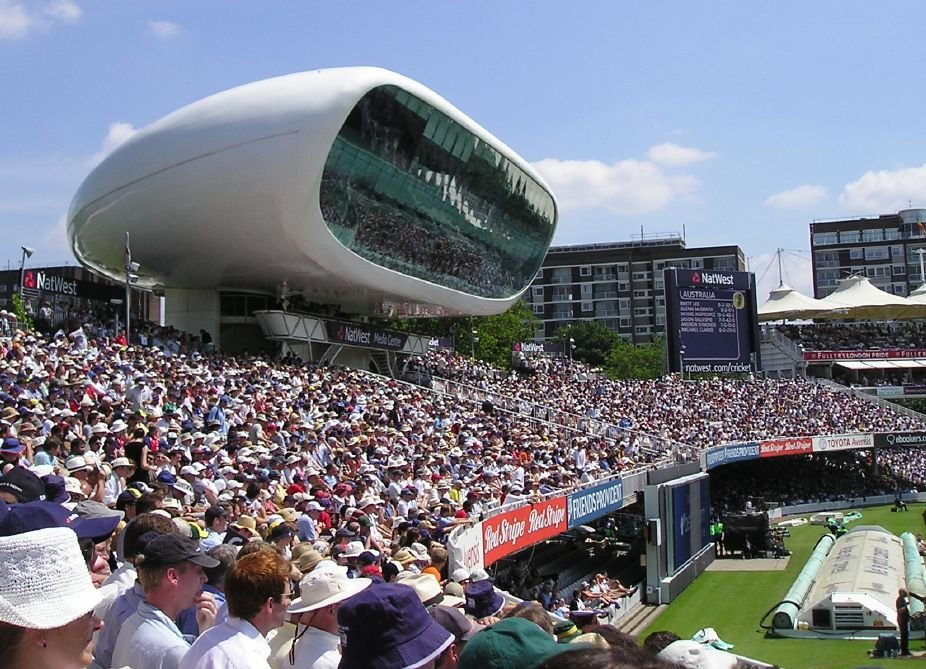
The Media Centre at Lord's Cricket Ground

English cricket experienced a decline during the 1990s. This was not helped by squabbles between key players and the chairman of selectors, Raymond Illingworth. England frequently suffered heavy defeats in the Ashes series, as they were spellbound by Shane Warne and later Glenn McGrath. They were declared the unofficial worst side in the world after the 1999 home series loss to New Zealand.

Under their new captain Graham Gooch at the beginning of the decade, England missed out on a historic victory against the all-conquering West Indies cricket team, by losing their final two test matches having gone into them with a 1–0 lead. The elevation to the position of captain for Gooch led to him reaching new heights as a batsman during the summer of 1990. The new captain broke the record for most runs in a match against India at Lord's with scores of 333 and 123. New team members such as Michael Atherton, Alec Stewart and Angus Fraser aided the new captain to victories against India and New Zealand yet the team were unable to regain the Ashes during the following winter, losing 3–0.

The team returned during 1991 to more successful ways, by defeating Sri Lanka and New Zealand and holding the West Indies to a drawn series. Another excellent innings from Gooch against the likes of Malcolm Marshall, Curtly Ambrose and Courtney Walsh at Headingley helped the side to their first victory against the team in England for over two decades. Although England were not the best Test match side in the world, they could lay claim to holding that position in the one-day game. The 1992 Cricket World Cup saw England performing better than any other team, with victories over Australia, the West Indies and South Africa led them to the final against Pakistan, where a side led and inspired by Imran Khan defeated Gooch's side.

Around this time, players such as Ian Botham, Allan Lamb and David Gower all came to the end of their international careers and specifically in the case of Botham, England had trouble replacing these players. Batsmen like Graeme Hick, Mark Ramprakash, Chris Lewis and Phil Tufnell all promised and sometimes delivered a great deal, yet the side often performed badly and disappointed its fans. Following their victory in New Zealand before the Cricket World Cup, they did not win again for another two and a half years, when the side again defeated the same opponents. During this period defeats by Pakistan, India, Sri Lanka and Australia culminated in Gooch stepping down in the summer of 1993 as captain, to be replaced by his partner at the top of the order, Michael Atherton.

The period of captaincy under Atherton was seen as one of disaster followed by more and more disappointment for England's fans. Selectoral differences between Atherton and Raymond Illingworth often meant that players such as Angus Fraser and Devon Malcolm would not get picked, against the captain's wishes. Teams would sometimes have too many batsmen, no spin bowler and the plethora of players who would come into the side and then quickly disappear, was symptomatic of a troubled side. The demands of county cricket often meant that injuries would deny Atherton key players and when compared with Australian cricket, it was seen as antiquated by many. Performances of great excellence would often crop up, amid the rubbish. These included two centuries in a test match at Port of Spain by Alec Stewart, nine wickets in an innings from Devon Malcolm against South Africa, seven wickets on debut by Dominic Cork against the West Indies and Michael Atherton and Jack Russell batting for ten hours to salvage a draw in Johannesburg. By 1997, calls for Atherton to step down were only put off by an exciting victory at The Oval against Australia, despite losing the series 3–2. On the following tour to the West Indies, a 3–1 defeat forced the beleaguered captain to step down, to be replaced by wicketkeeper-batsman Alec Stewart.

Stewart's first test series against South Africa in the summer of 1998 resulted in the side's first success in a five match test series since their last victory against Australia in 1986/1987. Bowlers such as Dominic Cork, Angus Fraser and Darren Gough now led the bowling attack with Nasser Hussain, Graham Thorpe and Mark Ramprakash supporting Stewart and Atherton in the batting. Yet the deficiencies in the system remained and a 3–1 defeat on their next Ashes tour and a humiliating exit in the first round of the 1999 Cricket World Cup which was hosted by England led to the exit of Stewart.

His replacement as captain, Essex batsman Nasser Hussain, was the unfortunate holder of the captaincy during the 1999 Test series against New Zealand when a 2–1 defeat resulted in the country which gave birth to the game, being officially ranked as the worst Test-playing nation in the world.

== 2000s ==
Hussain's side was unable to avoid defeat in South Africa, yet his first series victory, against Zimbabwe the following summer, saw the side winning their next three test series. This included the side's first victory against the West Indies in 32 years, impressive wins in Pakistan, where Thorpe and Hussain helped see the side to victory in the dark in Karachi and a 2–1 defeat of Sri Lanka, where England displayed a new-found confidence of playing against spin bowling, a move instigated by their new coach Duncan Fletcher. However, the ultimate test for the side against Australia showed that England were still found wanting against the very best, losing 4–1.

Injuries and retirements from the English side over the next year allowed new players to be introduced. Out went Atherton, Hick, Ramprakash, Gough, Cork, Tufnell and Andy Caddick and in came Marcus Trescothick, Michael Vaughan, Andrew Flintoff, Matthew Hoggard, Simon Jones, Stephen Harmison and Ashley Giles. Hussain looked to create a side which was harder to beat and would often rule with an uncompromising attitude. Changes which the game had long needed were made, with central contracts limiting how much county cricket the players could play and the establishment of an academy. Encouraging performances by players such as Vaughan, Trescothick and Hoggard against India and Sri Lanka did give England some positive sentiments towards their chances against Australia, yet a 4–1 defeat against what was possibly the greatest team ever demonstrated that they were still falling short. These factors, along with and England's withdrawal from a 2003 Cricket World Cup match in Zimbabwe led to Hussain becoming disillusioned with the job.

After the first Test of the 5 Test series against South Africa was drawn, Nasser Hussain resigned the Test captaincy, with Michael Vaughan being appointed in his stead. Vaughan went on to draw the series 2–2, after an Oval Test match rated by most commentators as the greatest in England since the 1981 Headingley Test. By the time of the tour in early 2004 to the West Indies, Vaughan had settled into his position as captain and was seen as an inspirational leader, who was respected by his players. This newly found confidence in the team led the side to a 3–0 victory in the Caribbean, followed by whitewashes over New Zealand and the West Indies at home, with players such as Harmison and Flintoff becoming amongst the very best in the world.

On 21 December 2004 England completed their eighth successive Test victory with a win in the opening Test against South Africa at Port Elizabeth. This was the best sequence of Test match wins by England. The team also were able to complete their first away victory over their opponents since they were re-admitted to the game in 1991.

Coming into the 2005 Ashes series, England had moved up to second, having won 14 and drawn 3 of their 18 previous Test matches since March 2004, raising hopes that the series would be closely fought. The Ashes series had a long build up, with England and Australia playing a triangular ODI series with Bangladesh, with the final England-Australia match ending in a tie (not a draw), prior to a second one-day series between England and Australia won 2–1 by Australia.

Australia won the first Test at Lord's comfortably, but England came back to win the second Test at Edgbaston with a two-run victory, the narrowest win by runs in Ashes history. The third Test ended in a draw, with one day having been lost to rain and England one wicket away from victory. England then narrowly won the fourth Test in Nottingham by three wickets after forcing the Australians to follow on. In the fifth and final Test at the Oval in London England came into the final day needing to avoid a defeat with a lead of 40 runs and one wicket down, and batted until well after the tea interval to ensure the game would end a draw and England would regain the Ashes 2–1.

In the first Test series (versus Pakistan) after The Ashes triumph in November/December 2005, England came down to earth with a bump. In the first Test match in Multan, England squandered a strong position (first innings lead of 144) to eventually lose the match by 22 runs. The second Test at Faisalabad was drawn with Pakistan pressing hard for victory. In the final Test at Lahore, England collapsed again to lose by an innings and 100 runs (their first innings defeat for two years).

A Test series against India followed in March 2006 with Andrew Flintoff as captain. After the first Test match was drawn due to bad light on the final day, India came back strongly to win the second Test, but England showed true character to come back and win the third (their first Test Match win in India for 21 years) without five key players, including skipper Michael Vaughan and vice-captain Marcus Trescothick, to level the three-game series. Although Trescothick returned for the three-Test series against Sri Lanka in England, Flintoff retained the captaincy in the absence of Vaughan. England went on to draw the first test match despite taking a commanding lead after the first innings; England won the second test match but lost the third to tie the series 1–1.

With Flintoff now also absent through injury, England had yet another new captain in Andrew Strauss for the subsequent one-day series with Sri Lanka. After narrowly losing the one-off Twenty20 international, England then lost all five of the One-day Internationals, not helped by wayward bowling and further injuries. Strauss remained captain for the start of the Test series with Pakistan which followed. After the first match was drawn, Strauss was given the captaincy for the rest of the series when Flintoff was ruled out for the rest of the season, and under Strauss the side went on to win back-to-back tests at Old Trafford and Headingley and take an unassailable lead in the four-match series. The final test at The Oval ended in farce when umpires Darrell Hair and Billy Doctrove awarded five runs to England after ruling that Pakistan had tampered with the ball. Pakistan refused to leave the pavilion after tea and the umpires removed the bails, signifying that Pakistan had forfeited the match. Pakistan later took to the field, only for the umpires to stay in the pavilion. After a night of heated discussions, it was eventually agreed that the test had been correctly awarded to England, handing them a 3–0 series win.

Flintoff was awarded the captaincy for the 2006–07 Ashes tour but shambolic England performances saw the team collapse to a 5–0 whitewash, with a late fightback to ultimately win the following Commonwealth Bank one-day series proving scant consolation. Michael Vaughan returned from injury to lead a sorry World Cup campaign with England losing to New Zealand, Sri Lanka and South Africa and crashing out in the Super 8s, despite a thrilling victory over the West Indies, thanks to Kevin Pietersen's century, in Brian Lara's last international appearance.

== See also ==
- England Cap Numbers
- History of the England Cricket Team pre 1939
