= 1950 English cricket season =

51st season of County Championship cricket in England

1950 was the 51st season of County Championship cricket in England. England and West Indies played a memorable Test series which the visitors won 3–1. The championship was shared by Lancashire and Surrey.

== Honours ==
- County Championship – Lancashire and Surrey shared the title
- Minor Counties Championship – Surrey II
- Wisden Cricketers of the Year from 1951 edition of Wisden for deeds in the 1950 season – Godfrey Evans, Sonny Ramadhin, Alf Valentine, Everton Weekes, Frank Worrell

== Test series ==
=== West Indies tour ===
England lost the series 3–1 to John Goddard's West Indies who claimed four places in the Wisden Five Cricketers of the Year (see above). Not only was this the first time that West Indies had won a series in England, but they had never previously won a Test in the country. Ramadhin had match figures of 11–152 at Lord's, and his "spin twin" Valentine had figures of 11–204 at Old Trafford and 10–160 at The Oval.

== Leading batsmen ==
1950 English cricket season – leading batsmen by average
Name	Innings	Runs	Highest	Average	100s
Everton Weekes	33	2310	304*	79.65	7
Willie Watson	12	684	132	68.40	3
Frank Worrell	31	1775	261	68.26	6
Reg Simpson	47	2576	243*	62.82	8
John Dewes	45	2432	212	59.31	9
Leonard Hutton	40	2128	202*	57.51	6
Murray Hofmeyr	21	1063	161	55.94	4

1950 English cricket season – leading batsmen by aggregate
Name	Innings	Runs	Highest	Average	100s
Reg Simpson	47	2576	243*	62.82	8
John Dewes	45	2432	212	59.31	9
Laurie Fishlock	59	2417	147	44.75	6
John Langridge	65	2412	241	40.20	5
George Cox junior	55	2369	165*	49.35	6

Watson missed much of the season because he was in the England football team that contested the 1950 World Cup in Brazil.

== Leading bowlers ==
1950 English cricket season – leading bowlers by average
Name	Balls	Maidens	Runs	Wickets	Average
Roy Tattersall	8428	501	2623	193	13.59
Sonny Ramadhin	6262	398	2009	135	14.88
Jim Laker	8399	530	2544	166	15.32
Emrys Davies	2478	131	923	57	16.19
Brian Statham	1805	82	613	37	16.56
Johnny Wardle	9773	743	2909	174	16.71

1950 English cricket season – leading bowlers by aggregate
Name	Balls	Maidens	Runs	Wickets	Average
Roy Tattersall	8428	501	2623	193	13.59
Johnny Wardle	9773	743	2909	174	16.71
Jim Laker	8399	530	2544	166	15.32
Doug Wright	5577	187	3140	151	20.79
Eric Hollies	7969	488	2713	144	18.84

== Annual reviews ==
- Playfair Cricket Annual 1951
- Wisden Cricketers' Almanack 1951
