= History of the England cricket team to 1939 =

The history of the England cricket team can be said to date back to at least 1739, when teams styled "Kent" and "All England" played a match at Bromley Common. Over 300 matches involving "England" or "All England" prior to 1877 are known. However these teams were usually put together on an ad hoc basis and were rarely fully representative.

The history of the current England team can be traced to 1877 when England played in what was subsequently recognised as the very first Test match. Since then, up to 20 August 2006 they have played 852 Test matches, winning 298, losing 245 and drawing 309. During these 852 matches, they have been captained by 77 different players.

== Early history ==
The term "England" was first used in reports of two Kent v England matches in July 1739.

The first match was at Bromley Common in Kent on Monday 9 July 1739. It was billed as between "eleven gentlemen of that county (i.e., Kent) and eleven gentlemen from any part of England, exclusive of Kent". Kent, described as "the Unconquerable County" won by "a very few notches".

The second match was at the Artillery Ground in Bunhill Fields, Finsbury on Monday 23 July 1739. This game was drawn and a report includes the phrase "eleven picked out of all England".

In subsequent decades there were many more such matches between a team representing a county, or the MCC, and a team drawn from the rest of England and described as "England" or "All England". As the next section describes, in 1846 the term "All England Eleven" would acquire a new, more precise, definition.

== The All England Eleven (AEE) ==
In 1846 William Clarke formed the All England Eleven (AEE) as a touring team of leading players to play matches at big city venues, mainly in the North of England. Clarke's team was a top-class team worthy of its title. The AEE lasted until 1880. In 1852, several players set up the United All England Eleven as a rival to the AEE, and from 1857 to 1866 the annual match between these two teams was arguably the most important contest of the English season – certainly judged by the quality of the players.

== Early tours ==
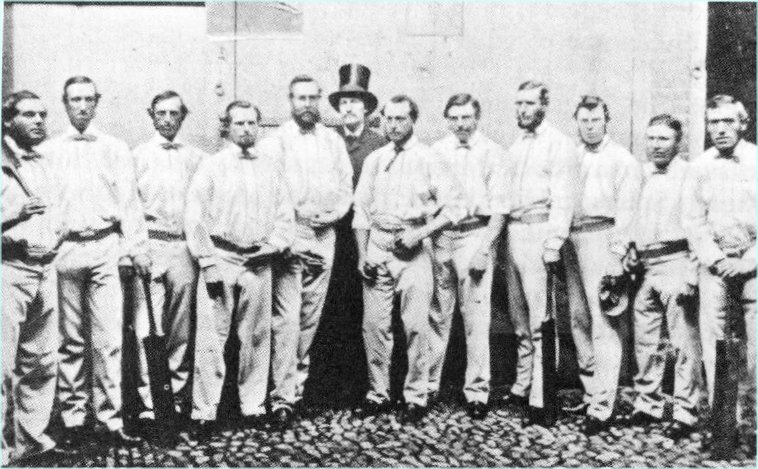
The team that toured Australia in 1861.

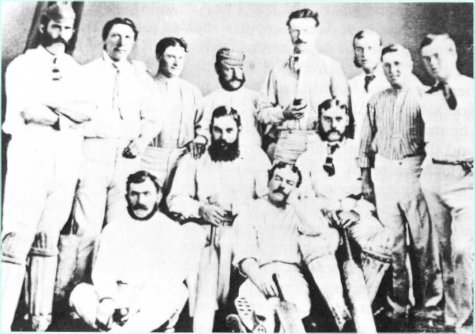
The 1873/4 team.

The early overseas tours were organised as purely commercial ventures, as indeed were the first Test-playing tours. The first such tour was to North America by a team of English professionals, departing England in September 1859. The team comprised six players from the All England Eleven and six from the United All England Eleven, and was captained by George Parr. They played five matches, winning them all. There were no first-class fixtures.

With the outbreak of the American Civil War, attention turned to Australia. The inaugural tour of the country took place in 1861–2, and was organised by Messrs Spiers & Pond. Led by HH Stephenson, the English team played 12 matches, but none were first-class.

In 1863–4, the Melbourne Cricket Club organised a tour by an English team under the captaincy of George Parr, which also visited New Zealand. The team played 16 matches, but none were first-class.

There were further tours of North America (taking in both the US and Canada) in late 1868, led by Edgar Willsher, and in late 1872, under R.A. Fitzgerald. The latter team included W.G.Grace.

In 1873–4, the Melbourne Cricket Club organised a tour by a team under the captaincy of WG Grace, which played 15 matches, but none were first-class.

Most of the matches of these early touring teams were played "against odds", that is to say the opposing team was permitted to have more than eleven players (usually twenty-two) in order to make a more even contest.

== 1877 to 1890 ==
James Lillywhite, a professional with Sussex CCC, led a team which had sailed on the P&O steamship Poonah on 21 September 1876. They played in Australia and then New Zealand before returning to Australia to play a combined Australian XI, for once on even terms of eleven-a-side. The match, starting on 15 March 1877 at the Melbourne Cricket Ground, came to be regarded as the first Test match, although none of its participants could have guessed at its significance at the time. Charles Bannerman, of Australia, faced the first ball and scored the first century, a glorious 165 before retiring hurt with a broken finger. The next highest score in this inaugural Test for Australia was Tom Horan with 10. Alfred Shaw of England bowled the first ball and took 5 for 38 in Australia's second innings. Tom Kendall, born in England, took 7 English wickets for 55 to bring Australia victory by 45 runs. 100 years later, in the Centenary Test, the result and margin would be exactly the same. England won a second match to square the series.

In 1878/79 Kent captain and MCC luminary Lord Harris took a team, consisting mainly of amateurs, to Australia where they lost by 10 wickets at Melbourne. Their batting was reasonably strong but the lack of professional bowlers cost them dear. The tour became famous for an unseemly incident in a tour game at Sydney where a near riot broke out. One of the umpires was Edmund Barton, who became Australia's first prime minister.

The 1880 Australian tourists were the first to play a Test match on English soil. Their 'demon' bowler, Fred Spofforth, sustained a hand injury and, crucially, missed the game in which W.G. Grace scored 152 and Billy Murdoch one run better. Lord Harris led the victorious England team at the Oval.

An all professional team, organised by Shaw, Shrewsbury and Lillywhite sailed to Australia for the 1881/82 campaign. The tour was bedeviled with scandal and allegations of fisticuffs, betting and heavy drinking. Tom Garrett took 18 wickets in the three Tests played for Australia. Many of the tour matches were still against local '22's. Australia won the four Test series 2 – 0.

The developing rivalry took on a new turn in 1882, when England lost at home at The Oval in the solitary Test of the summer. Spofforth took 7 for 46 and 7 for 44 and Ted Peate, Yorkshire slow left armer who had taken 8 wickets, was out just 8 runs short of victory. Upset at this turn of events, The Sporting Times printed an obituary to English cricket: "In Affectionate Remembrance of ENGLISH CRICKET, which died at the Oval on 29th AUGUST 1882, Deeply lamented by a large circle of sorrowing friends and acquaintances R.I.P. N.B. – The body will be cremated and the ashes taken to Australia."

When England toured Australia the following winter of 1882/83 and won 2–1, the England captain, the Hon. Ivo Bligh was presented with an urn that contained some ashes, which have variously been said to be of a bail, ball or even a woman's veil. And so The Ashes series was born. Yorkshire stalwart Billy Bates, who played all his 15 Tests on 5 tours to Australia, scored 55 and took 14 for 102 at Melbourne in the second Test, including the first Test hat-trick, to bring England the first innings victory in Test cricket. A.G. Steel made 135* at Sydney – although he did drop Bonner 4 times (out of 8 drops in total) as the giant Australian hitter scored 87.

England won 1–0 in the three Test series in 1884. Peate took 6 for 85 in Australia's first innings, and Ulyett 7 for 36, the second as England won by an innings Lord's where Steel made a wonderful 148 out of England's first innings of 379. Australia's captain Billy Murdoch scored the first Test double hundred at the Oval where Walter Read of England hit a century in 113 minutes after going in at number 10. All 11 Englishmen bowled in Australia's innings, including wicket keeper Lyttelton with underarm lobs.

England embarked on a long stretch of dominance. They won 14 and lost only 3 of the Tests played between 1884 and 1890. Billy Barnes hit 134 in the opening Adelaide Test of the five Test 1884/85 series while Johnny Briggs of Lancashire hit a two-hour ton at Melbourne in the second, where Australia fielded a completely new team of 11 different players after a dispute over gate money. Wilfred Flowers scored 56 and took 5 for 46 in the third Test at Sydney where Australia pulled back a game thanks to Bonner smashing a century in even time. England won the deciding fifth Test by an innings at Melbourne, Arthur Shrewsbury making 105*.

W. G. Grace scored 170 in the Oval Test of 1886, beating the individual Test innings record of 164 set by Arthur Shrewsbury in the previous match on an evil pitch at Lords. England won by an innings on the third day after Australia were bowled out for 68 and 149m with George Lohmann of Surrey taking 12 for 104. The Australian tourists, without Bannerman or Murdoch and often losing Spofforth to injuries, lost all three Tests.

Shrewsbury's England beat Australia in both matches on the 1886–87 tour, despite being bowled out for 45 on the first day at Sydney. Two England parties toured there in 1887–88, with Shaw and Shrewsbury's team sponsored by Melbourne CC and Lord Harris's team by the Sydney Association. The two teams joined up for one Test Match at Sydney which they won thanks to Lohmann's 9 wickets and Bobby Peel's 10. Australia made just 42 and 82 on a poor pitch in bad light.

The 1888 Australians won at Lords but lost at The Oval and Old Trafford. Their bowling was penetrative, particularly Jack Ferris and the 'terror' Charlie Turner, but their batting was too weak to withstand the English professionals in their home conditions. Bobby Peel took 11 wickets at Old Trafford.

England won the first Test in South Africa, at Port Elizabeth in March 1889 by 8 wickets, despite fielding a less than first choice XI. W.H. Ashley took 7 for 95 for South Africa in his only Test. Bobby Abel of Surrey scored 120 for England in the Second Test, the first hundred scored in South Africa. Bernard Tancred of South Africa became the first Test batsman to carry his bat, for 26*, as South Africa collapsed to 47 all out. M.P. Bowden remains the youngest man to captain England, at just 23 years and 144 days. Johnny Briggs took 7 for 17 and 8 for 11 at Cape Town, 14 bowled and 1 LBW.

== 1890s ==
Four ball overs gave way to five ball overs in the 1890s and to six ball overs in Australia, as the game continued to develop quickly. England won the 1890 Ashes series 2–0, although Jack Barrett carried his bat for 67 through Australia's second innings of 176 at Lord's. W. G. Grace was out second ball in the first innings but saw England home in the second with 75*. Frederick Martin took 12 Australian wickets for 102 but 'Nutty' never played an Ashes match again. The third scheduled match, at Old Trafford, was the first Test to be abandoned without a ball being bowled.

W. G. Grace's tourists lost 2–1 on the 1891–92 tour, Australia winning at Melbourne and Sydney, where Bannerman batted for seven and a half hours and scored only three boundaries and England's Bobby Abel carried his bat for 132. England claimed a consolation innings victory at Adelaide where Stoddard scored 134 and Peel 83 and Briggs took 6 wickets in each innings.

England won the only Test on the 1891/92 tour of South Africa at Cape Town, where Harry Wood, the Surrey wicket keeper made 134 not out and Ferris, who had earlier played for Australia, took 13 for 91. Billy Murdoch was another Australian turned Englishman on the tour.

England regained the Ashes in 1893, with an innings win at The Oval and draws in the other two Tests. W. G. Grace and A.E. Stoddart made three consecutive century opening stands. William Gunn of Nottinghamshire scored his only Test hundred, 102*, at Old Trafford, while Arthur Shrewsbury scored 106 at Lord's. Future England great Ranjitsinhji was one of the unfortunate bowlers as Australia set a new record team score of 843 against 'Oxford and Cambridge Past and Present' in Portsmouth.

Andrew Stoddart led England to a thrilling 3–2 victory on the 1894–1895 Ashes tour. Bobby Peel took the final wickets in the first Test victory at Sydney and the second at Melbourne and hit the winning runs in the final and deciding Test at the MCG. England's amazing victory at Sydney, by 10 runs, came after they had followed on with Lancashire's Albert Ward hitting 75 and 117 in the game. J.T. Brown scored 140 for England at Melbourne where England were set 297 to win. He reached 50 in 28 minutes and put on a then record 210 with Ward as England won by six wickets. Tom Richardson took 32 wickets in the Tests.

England won all three Tests of the 1895/96 tour of South Africa by resounding margins. Lohmann was unplayable, taking 7 for 38 and 8 for 7 at Port Elizabeth and finishing with a hat trick. He took 9 for 28 and 3 for 43 at Johannesburg and 7 for 42 and 1 for 45 at Cape Town.

Having been overlooked for the first Test at Lord's, where Australian captain Harry Trott scored 143 and put on a record 210 with Syd Gregory (103), Shri Ranjitsinhji burst into Test cricket with 62 and 154 at Old Trafford in 1896. His magical batting and Tom Richardson's 13 for 244 were not enough to prevent Australia running out winners by 3 wickets however. Five English professionals went on 'strike' for more money before the Oval Test. Abel, Hayward and Richardson relented, but Gunn and Lohmann never played for England again. England won the series 2–1.

The Ashes were lost on Andrew Stoddart's 1897/98 tour, with Australia thumping England 4–1. Australian Joe Darling was the first batsmen to make 500 runs in a Test series, including 101 at Sydney, 178 at Adelaide and 160 in the final Sydney Test, where his hundred came up in 91 minutes. Stoddart's mother died just before the first Test and he was too distraught to play in either of the first two matches. Ranji, batting at number 7 after a throat infection, scored a brilliant 175 in the first Test and took England over 500 for the first time in a game won by 9 wickets but the Englishmen lost the next four heavily.

Lord Hawke's tourists in 1898/99 played and won two Tests in South Africa, with sometime Australian Albert Trott taking 17 wickets. Plum Warner carried his bat for 132 at Johannesburg in his maiden Test.

The 1899 series against Australia saw two significant developments. For the first time in England, five Tests were played rather than three, with Trent Bridge and Headingley being added to the "traditional" venues of Lord's, The Oval and Old Trafford. Also MCC and the counties appointed a selection committee for the first time. It comprised three active players: Lord Hawke, W.G. Grace and H.W. Bainbridge who was the captain of Warwickshire. Prior to this, England teams for home Tests had been chosen by the club on whose ground the match was to be played. The peerless Australian Victor Trumper dominated the series. He scored 1,500 runs on the tour, including 300 not out against Sussex and a breathtaking century in Australia's sole, but deciding, Test victory at Lords. W.G. Grace played his last Test at Trent Bridge. F.S. Jackson and Tom Hayward put on 185 at the Oval for the first wicket. England, scoring 576, forced Australia (352) to follow on, but the Australians played out the draw and with it retained the Ashes.

== 1900–1914: The "Golden Age" ==
The first Test series of the new century took place in Australia 1901–1902 and was won by Australia who came from one down to take the series 4–1. The England team was a private venture of Archie MacLaren (although the matches were all official Test matches). It was rather an attritional series of matches with only three centuries being scored and only one team innings over 400 (the first innings of England in the First Test at the SCG). Sydney Barnes made his debut for England and took 19 wickets in the first two Tests before being injured in the third and talking no further part in the series.

There was a home series against Australia in 1902 which was won by the Australians (2–1). In the drawn First Test at Edgbaston Australia were dismissed for 36 in their first innings (Wilfred Rhodes 7 for 17) but rain meant that the match was drawn. Rain also ruined the following match at Lord's. Sydney Barnes returned to the England team and had immediate success, taking seven wickets in the third Test at Sheffield (the only Test ever to be played there). However England still lost the match. The final two Tests were amongst the most exciting of all time. A brilliant century by Trumper helped Australia to win the match at Old Trafford by three runs. England's batting throughout the series was modest with only one innings of over 300 and with only three centuries scored. The last of these was a match-winning innings in the final Test at The Oval by Gilbert Jessop, who went in at number seven in the second innings with England 48–5 and scored what was then the fastest century in Test cricket in 70 minutes, setting up an improbable England win by one wicket. The last wicket pair of Wilfred Rhodes and George Hirst nervelessly acquired the final fifteen runs needed for victory.

England toured Australia in 1903–1904, the first time that the MCC had been responsible for an England tour overseas. England regained The Ashes with a 3–2 series win under the captaincy of Plum Warner. In the first Test R.E.Foster made his Test debut and scored 287 in his first ever innings – the then highest ever Test score and a record that was to stand for a quarter of a century. Wilfred Rhodes took 15 wickets in England's second Test win at the MCG –a record that was to stand for thirty years. In the fifth Test England were dismissed for 61 in their first innings on a rain-affected pitch.

In 1905 Australia toured England and were beaten 2–0 with three matches drawn. Notable batting performances in the series included centuries by A.C. MacLaren, F.S. Jackson (2), Johnny Tyldesley (2) and C.B. Fry. B.J.T. Bosanquet, the inventor of the googly, took eight wickets in an Innings in the First Test.

In 1905–06 Plum Warner took an MCC team to South Africa for the first time and England were soundly beaten 4–1 in the series. England's batting faltered throughout the series with only one team innings in excess of 200 (successive innings of 184,190,148,160,295,196,198,160,187 and 130) and just one individual century (by F.L.Fane in the 3rd Test at the Wanderers). England's only win came at Newlands where the left-arm slow bowler Colin Blythe took eleven wickets in the match.

In 1907 there was a home three match Test series against South Africa which England, captained by R.E.Foster, won 1–0. Highlights included another sparkling innings by Gilbert Jessop who scored 93 at Lord's in a partnership of 145 for the sixth wicket with Len Braund who scored a century. There was another fine bowling performance by Blythe, who took 15 wickets at Headingley on a rain-affected match in a match that England won despite having been bowled out for 76 in their first innings.

In England's Test series in Australia in 1907–08 Australia won the first Test but England hit back well with a narrow win at the MCG in the 2nd Test in which Jack Hobbs made his England debut scoring 83 and 28. England were outplayed by Australia in the next three Tests and lost the series and the Ashes 4–1. England's batting was fragile throughout the series with only Gunn (2) and Hutchings scoring hundreds. The bowling relied on Jack Crawford), Arthur Fielder and Barnes, who took 79 wickets between them.

In a home series against Australia in 1909 England lost 2–1 (two draws) and no combination of players (England used 25 in total in the series) seemed to work. England failed to make 200 in an innings five times and there was only one individual century (by J. Sharp in the 3rd Test). The remarkable Colin Blythe delivered England's only victory by taking eleven wickets in the First Test at Edgbaston, but thereafter Australia, whilst never dominating the England attack, always had the edge.

England returned to South Africa in 1909–10 under H.D.G. Leveson-Gower, for a five match Test series and fared little better than on their first visit in 1905–06. The series was lost 3–2 but this disguises South Africa's superiority. The main highlight was Jack Hobbs first (of 15) Test century in the final Test at Newlands, he put on a then record 211 for the first wicket with Wilfred Rhodes. This was one of only two personal hundreds by England batsmen in the series. The bowling attack was weak – although the last of the great "lob" (underhand) bowlers George Simpson-Hayward had field days in the first three Test matches when he took a total of 21 wickets. Colin Blythe bowled England to a consolation win in the fifth Test with ten wickets in the match. Legspin dominated on the matting pitches, with the ball often bouncing chest high. Vogler took 29 wickets for the home team and Faulkner 29.

England toured Australia in 1911/12 under Plum Warner, but Johnny Douglas took over the captaincy when Warner fell ill prior to the first Test. Despite losing that first match at Sydney, a team which boasted Jack Hobbs, Frank Woolley, Sydney Barnes and Wilfred Rhodes hit back to take the next four Tests in style. Frank Foster and Barnes dominated with the ball, sharing 66 wickets, while Hobbs, Rhodes and Woolley recorded centuries. Hobbs and Rhodes shared opening stands of 147 at Adelaide and a then record 323 at Melbourne in the next Test where Barnes dismissed Bardsley, Kelleway, Hill and Armstrong for 3 runs in his opening spell. Later in the game, when the crowd barracked Barnes for deliberating over a field setting, he threw the ball down in disgust and refused to continue until order was restored. Frank Woolley also hit 305* in 205 minutes in a tour game against Tasmania.

The 1912 home season saw a unique experiment with a 9 Test triangular tournament involving South Africa and Australia but it was an idea ahead of its time and was not repeated. C.B. Fry of Sussex captained the team against Syd Gregory of Australia and Frank Mitchell of South Africa. Jack Hobbs scored 107 against Australia at Lords in a rain ruined game. The Australia v South Africa match, at Lord's, was notable for a visit by King George V, the first time a reigning monarch had watched Test cricket. Barnes took 34 wickets in his 3 Tests against the South Africans.

England's 1913/14 tour of South Africa was the last before the onset of World War I, and England dominated the rubber, winning 4–0. Syd Barnes was once again unplayable, taking 49 wickets in four Tests before boycotting the last in a row over his wife's accommodation. Only Herbie Taylor resisted for the home team, with skilful backfoot defence on the matting pitches, scoring 508 runs at 50.8.

== 1920s ==
England resumed their Test cricket after World War I with a tour of Australia in 1920/21 under Johnny Douglas. After the ravages of the war it was little surprise when England went down to a series of crushing defeats, the first 5–0 whitewash. Six Australians scored hundreds while Mailey spun out 36 English batsmen. Things were no better when Warwick Armstrong's men toured England in 1921. Australian fast bowlers Gregory and McDonald battered the English batsmen with a succession of bouncers and Jack Hobbs missed most of the season with first a leg injury then appendicitis. England used 30 players in all. Only one Australian made a century as opposed to 3 for England – A. C. "Jack" Russell scoring 101 and 102* and Phil Mead 182* – but Australia's 3–0 victory made it 8 Ashes defeats in succession.

England resumed the winning habit on the 1922/23 tour of South Africa, under F.T. Mann, winning a pulsating rubber 2 – 1. England lost the first Test but scraped to victory in the next, at Cape Town, by one wicket. Phil Mead scored 181 at Kingsmead, Durban, to ensure a draw and they won the fifth and final match, also at Durban, thanks to Jack Russell's twin centuries in his final Test. This dominance was underlined in England in 1924 with a 3–0 for England.

Hopes that the Ashes might be regained were dashed on the 1924/25 tour down under however, Australia thrashing England 4–1, although England scored 8 centuries to Australia's 6. Herbert Sutcliffe scored 734 runs at 81.56 and Maurice Tate broke Mailey's Ashes record with 38 wickets, bowling 2,528 balls in the Tests. England's only victory came at Melbourne, by an innings, after Captain Arthur Gilligan won the toss for the only time. It was England's first Ashes Test win in 12 years.

England drew the first four Tests of the 1926 Ashes series and so the series rested on the Oval Test, for which Percy Chapman replaced Arthur Carr as captain and both the 48-year-old Rhodes and 21-year-old Larwood were selected. Hobbs and Sutcliffe scored centuries and Australia lost by 289 runs. The South African team proved stronger than before however and drew the 1927/28 series 2–2.

A fourth team was, at last, introduced to Test cricket when the West Indies took their bow in 1928. England won each of the three Tests by an innings, Freeman taking 22 wickets, and a view was expressed in the press that their elevation had proved a mistake although 'electric heels' Learie Constantine did the double on the tour. The England team at this period was as strong as it has ever been and Australia were dispatched 4–1 on the 1928/29 Ashes tour. Hammond scored 44, 28, 251, 200, 32, 119*, 177, 38 and 16 – a total of 905 runs, a new record. Percy Chapman captained the team but barely played again.

England, under J. C. White and Arthur Carr, beat South Africa 2–0 at home in 1929 with Herbert Sutcliffe scoring a hundred in each innings at the Oval Bizarrely there were two concurrent England tours in 1929/30, one to New Zealand and one to the West Indies. Surrey paceman Maurice Allom took four wickets in five balls in New Zealand's maiden Test match, including a hat trick, and his 8 for 65 swept England to victory in Christchurch by 8 wickets with the three later Tests drawn. At the same time another England team were drawing 1–1 in the West Indies under F. S. G. Calthorpe. Forty-year-old Patsy Hendren made 1,765 runs on this tour and Andy Sandham scored 325 at Kingston (out of England's 849) in his final Test. The 'black Bradman' George Headley followed twin centuries at Georgetown with 223 in the same Kingston game.

== 1930s ==
The 21-year-old Don Bradman dominated the 1930 Ashes series in England, scoring 974 runs in his seven Test innings. He scored 254 at Lord's, 334 at Headingley, when Chapman stuck to attacking fields all day, and 232 at the Oval. Australia regained the Ashes. Harold Larwood took only four wickets in the series although K. S. Duleepsinhji made 173 at Lord's on debut.

England played five Tests in South Africa on the 1930/31 tour. Chasing 240 to win the first Test at the Old Wanderers ground in Johannesburg they were bowled out by E. P. Nupen, a master on the matting wicket, and drew the next four.

New Zealand played their first Test in England in 1931 and their strong performance at Lord's led the authorities to arrange another two that summer, one of which England won. India played their first Test in England in 1932 at Lords, reducing England to 19 for 3 on the first morning before losing a competitive match when they were bowled out for 187 chasing 346.

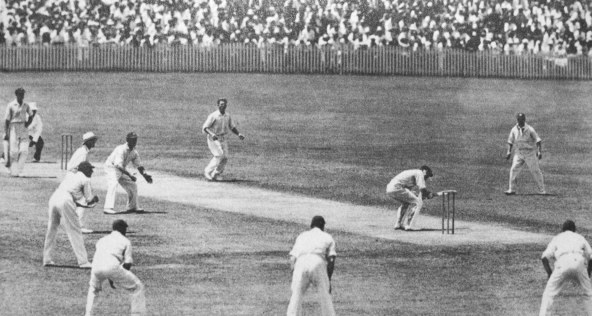
Bill Woodfull evades a Bodyline ball. Note the number of leg-side fielders.

Before the 1932–3 tour to Australia, England had become used to the prolific run-scoring of Don Bradman. The England captain, Surrey's Douglas Jardine chose to develop the already existing leg theory into fast leg theory, or bodyline, as a tactic to stop Bradman. Fast leg theory involved bowling fast balls directly at the batsman's body, and Jardine had two very fast accurate bowlers, Harold Larwood and Bill Voce to bowl them. The batsman would need to defend himself, and if he touched the ball with the bat, he risked being caught by one of a large number of fielders placed on the leg side.

England won the series and the Ashes 4–1. But complaints about the Bodyline tactic caused crowd disruption on the tour, and threats of diplomatic action from the Australian Cricket Board, which during the tour sent the following cable to the Marylebone Cricket Club in London:

Bodyline bowling assumed such proportions as to menace best interests of game, making protection of body by batsmen the main consideration. Causing intensely bitter feeling between players as well as injury. In our opinion is unsportsmanlike. Unless stopped at once likely to upset friendly relations existing between Australia and England.

Later, Jardine was removed from the captaincy and the laws of cricket changed so that no more than one fast ball aimed at the body was permitted per over, and having more than two fielders behind square leg were banned.

England won two Tests on the 1933/34 tour of India, the first ever Tests held in the sub continent. England won by nine wickets at Bombay's Gymkhana ground with Bryan Valentine scoring 136 in his first Test innings. Morris Nichols and E. W. "Nobby" Clark bowled so many bouncers at the Indian batsman that they wore solar topees instead of caps to protect themselves from the ball as much as the sun. Naoomal Jeoomal top edged a Clark bouncer into his head in the third Test, was unable to continue and didn't bat in the second innings.

Australia won the first Test of the 1934 Ashes series by 238 runs at Trent Bridge. Clarrie Grimmett took 25 wickets in the series, and Bill O'Reilly 28 as England were spun to defeat. Bradman made 758 runs in the Tests and 2020 on the tour, with Stan McCabe making 2078. Patsy Hendren(132) and Maurice Leyland (153) ensured a draw at Old Trafford and England did manage a rare Test win over Australia at Lord's with Hedley Verity taking 14 wickets in a day and 15 in the match. Bradman (304) and Ponsford (181) put on 388 at Headingley and then 451 at the Oval where England lost by a massive 562 runs. Ponsford scored 266 in his last Test. Nobby Clark bowled some 'leg theory' against the Australians, with little success. Bill Voce took 8 for 66 for Notts against the Australians but withdrew from the attack with a 'leg injury' after Woodfall raised discrete objections.

England toured the West Indies in 1934/5 and showed the folly of sending a weakened team as they lost the rubber 2–1 with George Headley scoring 270 not out in the 4th Test at Sabina Park. South Africa won on English soil for the first time, taking the 5 Test series 1–0 in 1935 with a victory at Lord's by 157 runs thanks to Bruce Mitchell's 164 and Jock Cameron's quickfire 90. Cameron died at 30, of enteric fever, soon after returning home from this tour.

India used 22 players in three Tests in England in 1936. A then record 588 runs were scored on the second day of the Old Trafford Test and England too experimented with their team and took the rubber 2–0.

The 1936/37 Ashes tour, under Gubby Allen, was a titanic struggle. England, helped by rain freshening the pitch, won by 322 runs in Brisbane and an innings in Sydney where Wally Hammond scored 271 not out. Bill Voce was their spearhead, taking 17 wickets in these two games. Bradman added a record 346 for the sixth wicket with Jack Fingleton at Melbourne and followed that with 212 at Adelaide where his team leveled the score at 2–2. Bradman, McCabe and Badcock all scored hundreds in the decider at Melbourne and Australian took the series 3–2.

England beat New Zealand 1–0 in a three Test rubber in 1937. Tom Goddard took 6 for 29 in bowling out the visitors for 134 at the Old Trafford Test as they chased 265 to win. Jack Cowie had taken 6 for 67 for New Zealand and 10 in the match. Len Hutton scored a century after having begun his England career with 0 and 1 at Lords. Prospective tours of South Africa and West Indies fell through in the winter of 1937/38.

The 1938 Ashes series was a high scoring affair. Hutton, Barnett, Paynter (216*) and Compton made hundreds at Trent Bridge with the Australians scoring three including Stan McCabe's brilliant 232. Hammond scored 240 in the Lord's Test while Bill Brown made a double ton and Bradman a match saving century for Australia. Old Trafford fell victim to the rain and Australia retained the Ashes with a win at Headingley, thanks to Bradman's century and 10 wickets for O'Reilly and 7 for Fleetwood-Smith. England won the final Test at the Oval thanks to a record Test score of 903 – 7 dec and Len Hutton's world record of 364 in 13 hours, 17 minutes. Bradman, whose score of 334 had been surpassed, was the first to congratulate the 22-year-old Yorkshireman. Maurice Leyland made 187 and the elegant Joe Hardstaff 169 not out. Australia subsided to 201 and 123, batting 2 short, and England won by an innings and 579.

Paul Gibb scored 93 and 106 on debut at Johannesburg on England's 1938/39 tour. England scored 11 centuries in the series and South Africa 6. Paynter scored 117 and 100 in the first Test and 243 in the third at Durban. England, 1–0, in the series, returned to Durban to play a deciding 'timeless' Test to the finish. It was abandoned as a draw after 10 days as England had to catch the train to catch the boat home. Needing 696 to win they were, incredibly, 654 for 5, Gibb having scored 120, Hammond 140 and Edrich 219. A record 1981 runs were scored, and the concept of timeless Tests was abandoned.

The three Tests between England and the West Indies in 1939 were the last before the Second World War, though a team for an MCC tour of India was selected more in hope than expectation of the matches being played. Len Hutton and Denis Compton, leading figures of the emerging batting generation, scored centuries at Lord’s, while George Headley made a century in each innings. Walter Hammond became the first fielder to reach 100 Test catches at Old Trafford. England won the series 1–0 as the war clouds gathered over Europe.

== See also ==
- England Cricket Team
- History of the England Cricket Team since 1945
- All England Eleven
- History of Test cricket (to 1883)
- History of Test cricket (1884 to 1889)
- History of Test cricket (1890 to 1900)
- History of Test cricket from 1901 to 1914
- List of Test matches (1918–1939)
- The Ashes
- England Cap Numbers
