= George Heane =

English cricketer

Cricket information
- Batting: Left-handed
- Bowling: Right-arm medium

Domestic team information
- Years: Team
- 1927–1951: Nottinghamshire

Career statistics
Competition	First-class
Matches	189
Runs scored	6,183
Batting average	25.34
100s/50s	9/30
Top score	138
Balls bowled	15,461
Wickets	222
Bowling average	32.91
5 wickets in innings	5
10 wickets in match	1
Best bowling	6/52
Catches/stumpings	99/–
- Source: Cricinfo, 11 March 2019

George Frank Henry Heane (2 January 1904 – 24 October 1969) was an English cricketer. He was a right-arm medium pace bowler and left-hand batsman. He played first-class matches for Nottinghamshire from 1927 to 1951, captaining the club in some games in 1935 and then regularly between 1936 and 1946, and for Marylebone Cricket Club from 1946 to 1948. He toured New Zealand with Sir Julien Cahn's XI in 1938-39.

Sporting positions
Preceded by Arthur Carr	Nottinghamshire County cricket captain 1935	Succeeded by Stuart Rhodes

Preceded by Stuart Rhodes	Nottinghamshire County cricket captain 1936–1946	Succeeded by William Sime
