= William Sime =

Cricket information
- Batting: Right-handed
- Bowling: Slow left-arm orthodox

Career statistics
Competition	First-class
Matches	96
Runs scored	2,473
Batting average	20.43
100s/50s	1/12
Top score	176*
Balls bowled	5,124
Wickets	49
Bowling average	46.93
5 wickets in innings	0
10 wickets in match	0
Best bowling	4/51
Catches/stumpings	55/–
- Source: CricInfo, 12 March 2019

William Arnold Sime CMG, MBE, QC (8 February 1909 – 5 May 1983) was a South African-born English barrister and judge who also played first-class cricket. Educated at Bedford School and at Balliol College, Oxford, he was a right-hand batsman and slow left-arm orthodox bowler.

He played first-class matches for the Minor Counties between 1929 and 1934, and Oxford University in 1931. He then joined Nottinghamshire in 1935 and stayed with them until 1950, captaining the club in his final three years.

Sime became a QC in 1957. He was appointed Recorder of Grantham in 1954, Recorder of Grimsby in 1963, Recorder of Birmingham in 1971, and was appointed a Circuit Judge in 1972. Sime was appointed a Companion of the Order of St Michael and St George (CMG) in the 1982 Birthday Honours, at which time he was Senior Judge of the Sovereign Base Areas Administration in Cyprus.

Sporting positions
Preceded by George Heane	Nottinghamshire County cricket captain 1947–1950	Succeeded by Reg Simpson
