= Andrew Corran =

English cricketer and schoolmaster (1936–2024)

Personal information
- Full name: Andrew John Corran
- Born: 25 November 1936; Norwich, Norfolk, England
- Died: 27 October 2024 (aged 87)
- Batting: Right-handed
- Bowling: Right-arm medium

Domestic team information
- Years: Team
- 1955–1960: Norfolk
- 1958–1960: Oxford University Cricket Club
- 1961–1965: Nottinghamshire

Career statistics
Competition	First-class	List A
Matches	132	3
Runs scored	2,476	27
Batting average	16.28	13.50
100s/50s	0/4	0/0
Top score	75	15
Balls bowled	23,883	234
Wickets	410	6
Bowling average	25.74	17.50
5 wickets in innings	21	0
10 wickets in match	1	0
Best bowling	7/45	4/35
Catches/stumpings	77/–	1/–
- Source: CricketArchive, 5 August 2020

Andrew John Corran (25 November 1936 – 27 October 2024) was an English first-class cricketer and schoolmaster.

After starting his career at Gresham's School, Holt (where he was also a good hockey player), at Trinity College, Oxford (where he was a cricket blue in all three of his seasons), and in Minor Counties cricket for Norfolk, Corran moved to Nottinghamshire, for whom he played between 1961 and 1965. He was the club's captain in the 1962 season, when he made 620 runs and took 64 wickets in the County Championship, but Nottinghamshire finished 15th. In the 1965 County Championship he took 109 wickets at an average of 20.30.

In the 1960 Oxford and Cambridge match, Corran took 12 wickets for 116 runs. Earlier in the season he had taken 7 for 45, bowling unchanged through the innings, to dismiss Lancashire for 103. Also in 1960, he played for the Gentlemen in the Gentlemen v Players match at Lord's.

A schoolmaster, Corran took a job in Australia in late 1965 and ended his first-class cricket career. From 1968 until his retirement he taught mathematics and cricket at Cranleigh School in Surrey.

Corran and his wife Gay, an artist, had five children. He died on 27 October 2024, at the age of 87.

Sporting positions
Preceded by John Clay	Nottinghamshire County cricket captain 1962	Succeeded by Geoff Millman
