= Sir Julien Cahn's cricket team in New Zealand in 1938–39 =

Sir Julien Cahn's cricket team, captained by George Heane, toured New Zealand in February and March 1939 to play ten matches including one first-class fixture against the New Zealand national cricket team at Basin Reserve; this match was drawn. Cahn's XI also played three-day matches against the major provincial teams Canterbury, Otago and Auckland, but these matches were 12-a-side and are not regarded as first-class. Cahn's XI included the New Zealander Stewie Dempster, Joe Hardstaff junior, Buddy Oldfield, Eddie Phillipson and Peter Smith.
