= Norman Hill (cricketer) =

English cricketer (1935–2023)

Personal information
- Full name: Norman Wilfred Hill
- Born: 22 August 1935; Holbeck, Nottinghamshire, England
- Died: 6 May 2023 (aged 87); Mablethorpe, Lincolnshire, England
- Batting: Left-handed
- Bowling: Right-arm leg-break

Domestic team information
- Years: Team
- 1953–1968: Nottinghamshire

Career statistics
Competition	First-class	List A
Matches	283	7
Runs scored	14,303	165
Batting average	29.43	23.57
100s/50s	23/62	0/1
Top score	201*	66
Balls bowled	240	–
Wickets	2	–
Bowling average	130.50	–
5 wickets in innings	0	–
10 wickets in match	0	–
Best bowling	1/28	–
Catches/stumpings	223/–	2/–
- Source: Cricinfo, 5 August 2020

Norman Wilfred Hill (22 August 1935 – 6 May 2023) was an English first-class cricketer. He played for Nottinghamshire from 1953 to 1968 and captained them in 1966 and 1967.

Sporting positions
Preceded by Geoff Millman	Nottinghamshire County cricket captain 1966–1967	Succeeded by Garfield Sobers
