= Nottinghamshire County Cricket Club =

English cricket club

- One Day name: Notts Outlaws

Personnel
- Captain: Haseeb Hameed
- One Day captain: Haseeb Hameed; Joe Clarke
- Coach: Peter Moores
- Overseas player: Fergus O'Neill

Team information
- Founded: 1841; 185 years ago
- Home ground: Trent Bridge
- Capacity: 17,500

History
- First-class debut: Sussex in 1835 at Brighton
- Championship wins: 7
- Pro40 wins: 1
- One-Day Cup wins: 3
- T20 Blast wins: 2
- B&H Cup wins: 1
- Official website: Nottinghamshire CCC

Nottinghamshire County Cricket Club is one of eighteen first-class county clubs within the domestic cricket structure of England and Wales. It represents the historic county of Nottinghamshire. The club's limited overs team is called the Notts Outlaws.

The county club was founded in 1841, although teams had played first-class cricket under the Nottinghamshire name since 1835. The county club has always held first-class status. Nottinghamshire had competed in the County Championship since the official start of the competition in 1890 and have played in every top-level elite domestic cricket competition in England.

The club plays most of its home games at the Trent Bridge cricket ground in West Bridgford, Nottingham, which is also a venue for Test matches. The club has played matches at numerous other venues in the county.

== History ==
=== Nottingham Cricket Club ===
Nottingham Cricket Club is known to have played important matches from 1771 onwards. Its main opponents were other town teams, especially Sheffield. The town club called itself Nottinghamshire when playing its first inter-county match versus Sussex at Brown's Ground in Brighton on 27, 28 & 29 August 1835.

=== Foundation of county club ===
The formal creation of Nottinghamshire County Cricket Club was enacted in March or April 1841 (the exact date has been lost). William Clarke established Trent Bridge as a cricket venue adjacent to the public house he ran. It was Clarke's successor as Nottinghamshire captain, George Parr, who first captained a united England touring team in 1859. The club elected its first president, Sir Henry Bromley, in 1869.

=== Professionals ===
Early professional greats such as Alfred Shaw and Arthur Shrewsbury ensured that Notts were a force in the period before 1900. Thanks largely to the outstanding bowling combination of Tom Wass and Albert Hallam, the county won the County Championship in 1907 when George Gunn, John Gunn and Wilfred Payton were also prominent.

Between the wars Notts enjoyed the services of the famous bowlers Harold Larwood and Bill Voce. Strong batting from George Gunn, Arthur Carr and Dodger Whysall saw them emerge as champions in 1929 after losing the title on the final day of the season in 1927. Prior to the second war, opening batsman Walter Keeton gained Test recognition, though the bowling was less effective.

Through the early fifties the team was weak. The signing of the Australian leg break bowler Bruce Dooland, arrested the decline but until the signing of the incomparable Garfield Sobers in 1968, the team was weak. Sobers hit Malcolm Nash of Glamorgan for six sixes in an over in a County Championship game at Swansea in his first season. Mike Harris scored heavily in the 1970s, including nine centuries in 1971 but apart from Barry Stead, the bowling lacked penetration.

=== 1970s and 1980s ===
Nottinghamshire enjoyed one of their strongest teams in the late seventies and early eighties when the New Zealand all-rounder Richard Hadlee, South African captain Clive Rice and England batsman Derek Randall led the team to the County Championship in 1981. The club's most successful season came in 1987, as Rice and Hadlee marked their departure with the double of County Championship and NatWest Trophy. Chris Broad and Tim Robinson continued the club's long tradition of batting excellence into the England team but for some years the club struggled to repeat those achievements, although they did claim a Benson & Hedges Cup in 1989 and a Sunday League title in 1991 under Robinson's captaincy. Former Warwickshire off spinner Eddie Hemmings made a significant contribution while local seam bowler Kevin Cooper was a consistent wicket taker.

=== 21st century ===
The following decade was one of underachievement, but in 2004, Nottinghamshire enjoyed a highly successful season, gaining promotion to both the Frizzell County Championship Division One, after winning Division Two, and also Totesport Division One. In 2005, Nottinghamshire won their first County Championship title since 1987, New Zealand's Stephen Fleming captaining the team to victory. However, the success was not sustained in 2006 and Notts were relegated by a margin of just half a point. They had more success in the shorter formats and ended up runners-up on their debut appearance at Twenty20 Cup finals day. In 2007, Notts won promotion back to the top flight of the County Championship, finishing second in Division Two.

In 2008, the first season of Chris Read's captaincy, they came close to winning both the County Championship and NatWest Pro40 outright, losing to Hampshire on the final day and Sussex on the final ball respectively. In 2010, Nottinghamshire made it to Finals Day of the Friends Provident Twenty20 Cup. Drawn against Somerset, Notts lost on the Duckworth Lewis method. However, they won the County Championship on the last day, having lost the preceding two matches, with Somerset in second place tied on points but with one less win. 2013 brought a second major trophy of the Read era with victory in the YB40 one-day competition. While further titles eluded them, Notts remained a fixture in the First Division of the Championship for the next decade under Read's long-running captaincy, also featuring a number of England players including Stuart Broad, Graeme Swann, Alex Hales, James Taylor and Samit Patel. In 2017, trophy success returned to Notts. Under the captaincy of Australian Dan Christian, they won their first T20 Blast trophy beating Birmingham Bears in the final, whilst in the same season securing the Royal London One-Day Cup with victory over Surrey.

Read, by now only captaining the first-class team, retired in 2017 and was replaced as club captain by Steven Mullaney, with Christian continuing to lead the T20 team. Despite struggles in the longer game, Notts won a second T20 Blast title in 2020, beating Surrey in a rain-affected final. Notts were relegated from Division One of the County Championship in 2019. They returned to the top tier as Division Two champions in 2022. Haseeb Hameed took over as the club captain in 2024. In 2025, Notts overhauled three-time defending champions Surrey in the closing weeks of the season to win their seventh County Championship title and first in 15 years.

== Players ==
=== Current squad ===
- No. denotes the player's squad number, as worn on the back of his shirt.
- ‡ denotes players with international caps.
- * denotes a player who has been awarded a county cap.

| No. | Name | Nat | Birth date | Batting style | Bowling style | Notes |
Batters
| 12 | Ben Martindale | England | 12 December 2002 (age 23) | Left-handed | Right-arm medium | |
| 17 | Ben Duckett* ‡ | England | 17 October 1994 (age 31) | Left-handed | — | England central contract |
| 26 | Ben Slater* | England | 26 August 1991 (age 35) | Left-handed | Right-arm medium | |
| 30 | Jack Haynes* | England | 30 January 2001 (age 25) | Right-handed | Right-arm off break | |
| 44 | Freddie McCann | England | 19 April 2005 (age 21) | Left-handed | Right-arm off break | |
| 93 | George Munsey ‡ | Scotland | 21 February 1993 (age 33) | Left-handed | Right-arm medium | White ball contract |
| 96 | Sam Seecharan | England | 16 August 2006 (age 20) | Right-handed | Right-arm medium | |
| 99 | Haseeb Hameed* ‡ | England | 17 January 1997 (age 29) | Right-handed | Right-arm leg break | Club captain |
All-rounders
| 8 | Lyndon James* | England | 27 December 1998 (age 27) | Right-handed | Right-arm medium | |
| 10 | Benny Howell | England | 5 October 1988 (age 38) | Right-handed | Right-arm fast-medium | White ball contract |
| 15 | Joe Pocklington | England | 14 November 2000 (age 25) | Left-handed | Slow left-arm orthodox | |
| 22 | Liam Patterson-White* | England | 8 November 1998 (age 27) | Left-handed | Slow left-arm orthodox | England development contract |
| 87 | Byron Hatton-Lowe | England | 13 December 2006 (age 19) | Right-handed | Right-arm fast-medium | |
Wicket-keeper
| 23 | Tom Moores* | England | 4 September 1996 (age 30) | Left-handed | — | White ball contract |
| 33 | Joe Clarke* | England | 26 May 1996 (age 30) | Right-handed | — | Captain (T20) |
| — | John Simpson ‡ | England | 13 July 1988 (age 38) | Left-handed | — | |
Bowlers
| 3 | Conor McKerr | South Africa | 19 January 1998 (age 28) | Right-handed | Right-arm fast | UK Passport |
| 4 | Robert Lord | England | 4 May 2001 (age 25) | Right-handed | Right-arm fast-medium | |
| 5 | Mohammad Amir ‡ | Pakistan | 13 April 1992 (age 34) | Left-handed | Left-arm fast-medium | UK passport |
| 7 | Farhan Ahmed | England | 22 February 2008 (age 18) | Right-handed | Right-arm off break | |
| 9 | Olly Stone* ‡ | England | 9 October 1993 (age 33) | Right-handed | Right-arm fast | |
| 11 | Fergus O'Neill | Australia | 27 January 2001 (age 25) | Right-handed | Right-arm fast-medium | Overseas player |
| 16 | Brett Hutton* | England | 6 February 1993 (age 33) | Right-handed | Right-arm fast-medium | |
| 18 | Dillon Pennington* | England | 26 February 1999 (age 27) | Right-handed | Right-arm fast-medium | |
| 24 | Josh Tongue* ‡ | England | 15 November 1997 (age 28) | Right-handed | Right-arm fast | England central contract |
| 48 | Tom Giles | England | 17 May 2006 (age 20) | Right-handed | Right-arm fast-medium | |
Source: Updated: 27 September 2026

=== Former players ===
The players with over 400 first-class appearances for the club are:

- George Gunn 583 (1902–32)
- Wilf Payton 489 (1905–31)
- John Gunn 489 (1896–1925)
- Tom Oates 420 (1897–1925)
- Arthur Carr 416 (1910–34)
- Joe Hardstaff Jr 408 (1930–55)
- Willis Walker 405 (1913–37)

The players with over 600 total club appearances (first-class, list A and twenty20; reflecting the introduction of one day county cricket in 1963) are:

- Derek Randall 800 (1971–93)
- Paul Johnson 748 (1981–2002)
- Tim Robinson 742 (1978–99)
- Chris Read 703 (1998–2017)
- Samit Patel 629 (2002–23)
- Basher Hassan 614 (1966–85)
- Bruce French 603 (1976–95)

== Club captains ==
A full list of captains of the club from its formation to the present day:

- William Clarke (1830–1855)
- George Parr (1856–1870)
- Richard Daft (1871–1880)
- William Oscroft (1881–1882)
- Alfred Shaw (1883–1886)
- Mordecai Sherwin (1887–1888)
- John Dixon (1889–1899)
- Arthur Jones (1900–1914)
- Arthur Carr (1919–1934)
- George Heane (1935)
- Stuart Rhodes (1935)
- George Heane (1936–1946)
- William Sime (1947–1950)
- Reg Simpson (1951–1960)
- John Clay (1961)
- Andrew Corran (1962)
- Geoff Millman (1963–1965)
- Norman Hill (1966–1967)
- Garfield Sobers (1968–1972)
- Brian Bolus (1972)
- Garfield Sobers (1973)
- Jack Bond (1974)
- Mike Smedley (1975–1979)
- Clive Rice (1979–1987)
- Tim Robinson (1988–1995)
- Paul Johnson (1996–1998)
- Jason Gallian (1998–2004)
- Stephen Fleming (2005–2007)
- Chris Read (2008–2017)
- Steven Mullaney (2018–2023)
- Haseeb Hameed (2024 to date)

== Records ==
Most first-class runs
| Player | Runs |
|---|---|
| George Gunn | 31,592 |
| Tim Robinson | 24,439 |
| Joe Hardstaff | 24,249 |
| Walter Keeton | 23,744 |
| John Gunn | 23,194 |
| Reg Simpson | 23,088 |
| Derek Randall | 23,069 |
| Wilfred Payton | 22,079 |
| Dodger Whysall | 20,376 |
| Paul Johnson | 20,256 |
| Arthur Jones | 20,244 |

Most first-class wickets
| Player | Wickets |
|---|---|
| Thomas Wass | 1,653 |
| Bill Voce | 1,312 |
| William Attewell | 1,303 |
| Sam Staples | 1,268 |
| Harold Larwood | 1,247 |
| Fred Barratt | 1,176 |
| Len Richmond | 1,148 |
| John Gunn | 1,128 |
| Arthur Jepson | 1,050 |

=== Team totals ===
- Highest total for – 791 v. Essex, Chelmsford, 2007
- Highest total against – 781/7 dec by Northamptonshire, Northampton, 1995
- Lowest total for – 13 v. Yorkshire, Nottingham, 1901
- Lowest total against – 16 by Derbyshire, Nottingham, 1879

=== Batting ===
- Highest score – 312* W. W. Keeton v. Middlesex, The Oval, 1939
- Most runs in season – 2,620 W. W. Whysall, 1929

==== Highest partnership for each wicket ====
- 1st – 406* D. J. Bicknell and G. E. Welton v. Warwickshire, Birmingham, 2000
- 2nd – 402 Haseeb Hameed and B. M. Duckett v. Derbyshire, Derby, 2022
- 3rd – 392* W. A. Young and J. M. Clarke v. Somerset, Taunton, 2024
- 4th – 361 A. O. Jones and J. R. Gunn v. Essex, Leyton, 1905
- 5th – 359 D. J. Hussey and C. M. W. Read v. Essex, Nottingham, 2007
- 6th – 372* K. P. Pietersen and J. E. Morris v. Derbyshire, Derby, 2001
- 7th – 301 C. C. Lewis and B. N. French v. Durham, Chester-le-Street, 1993
- 8th – 220 G. F. H. Heane and R. Winrow v. Somerset, Nottingham, 1935
- 9th – 170 J. C. Adams and K. P. Evans v. Somerset, Taunton, 1994
- 10th – 152 E. B. Alletson and W. Riley v. Sussex, Hove, 1911

=== Bowling ===
- Best bowling – 10/66 K. Smales v. Gloucestershire, Stroud, 1956
- Best match bowling – 17/89 F. C. L. Matthews v. Northamptonshire, Nottingham, 1923
- Wickets in season – 181 B. Dooland, 1954

== Honours ==
=== First XI honours ===
- County Championship (7) – 1907, 1929, 1981, 1987, 2005, 2010, 2025

Division Two (2) – 2004, 2022

- Gillette/NatWest/C&G Trophy (Note: Formerly known as the Gillette Cup (1963–1980), NatWest Trophy (1981–2000) and C&G Trophy (2001–2006).) (1) – 1987
- Sunday/National League (Note: Formerly known as the Sunday League (1969–1998).) (1) – 1991
- Benson & Hedges Cup (1) – 1989
- YB40 (1) – 2013
- Royal London One-Day Cup (1) – 2017
- T20 Blast (2) – 2017, 2020

=== Second XI honours ===
- Second XI Championship (3) – 1972, 1985, 2015
- Second XI Trophy (1) – 2011

== See also ==
- List of Nottinghamshire County Cricket Club grounds
