= Stuart Rhodes =

English cricketer

Cricket information
- Batting: Right-handed
- Bowling: Right-arm medium

Career statistics
Competition	First-class
Matches	24
Runs scored	599
Batting average	20.65
100s/50s	0/3
Top score	70
Balls bowled	108
Wickets	0
Bowling average	–
5 wickets in innings	–
10 wickets in match	–
Best bowling	–
Catches/stumpings	7/–
- Source: ESPNCricinfo, 11 March 2019

Stuart Denzil Rhodes (24 March 1910 – 7 January 1989) was an English cricketer, whose first-class career lasted from 1930 to 1935 with Nottinghamshire County Cricket Club (including serving as captain in his final year).

Sporting positions
Preceded by George Heane	Nottinghamshire County cricket captain 1935	Succeeded by George Heane
