= John Clay (Nottinghamshire cricketer) =

English cricketer

Personal information
- Full name: John Desmond Clay
- Born: 25 October 1924; West Bridgford, Nottingham
- Died: 11 February 2011 (aged 86); West Bridgford, Nottingham
- Batting: Right-handed

Career statistics
Competition	First-class
Matches	236
Runs scored	9,991
Batting average	26.08
100s/50s	11/49
Top score	192
Balls bowled	223
Wickets	0
Bowling average	–
5 wickets in innings	–
10 wickets in match	–
Best bowling	–
Catches/stumpings	165/0
- Source: CricketArchive, 6 October 2016

John Desmond Clay (25 October 1924 – 11 February 2011) was a right-handed batsman who played for Nottinghamshire between 1948 and 1961, captaining the side in his final year. He was Nottinghamshire's only professional captain before the distinction between amateur and professional was abolished in 1962.

Clay scored 9,991 runs in 236 matches at 26.08 for Nottinghamshire. His highest score came in 1952 when he made 192 against Hampshire at Trent Bridge. He was also an excellent slip fielder, holding a record of six catches in a match against Derbyshire.

After his first-class cricket career, he captained and mentored Nottinghamshire's second team. Writing in Wisden Cricketers magazine in 2011, Peter Wynne-Thomas, NCCC's archivist, said: 'This was an ideal role for an ideal cricketer who always saw the best in his fellow players.'

Clay followed NCCC all his life. He played for Notts Public Schools while a pupil at the West Bridgford School in the 1930s. This took him during tournaments to nearby Trent Bridge, Nottingham's Test arena. He continued to be a regular visitor to international and county cricket matches at Trent Bridge after his career there, where he was instrumental in setting up the supporters' club.

Clay served in the RAF in London during the Second World War. After he retired from cricket he was manager at Middleton's newsagents in West Bridgford before working at Boots until his retirement.

One of 14 children, John lived throughout his life within half a mile of Trent Bridge. He and his wife Sheila were married for over 60 years and had 2 children, 6 grandchildren, 17 great-grandchildren and 2 great-great-grandchildren.

Sporting positions
Preceded by Reg Simpson	Nottinghamshire County cricket captain 1961	Succeeded by Andrew Corran
