= Geoff Millman =

English cricketer

- Millman in 1966

Personal information
- Full name: Geoffrey Millman
- Born: 2 October 1934; Bedford, England
- Died: 6 April 2005 (aged 70); Bedford, England
- Batting: Right-handed
- Bowling: Right-arm offbreak
- Role: Wicket-keeper

International information
- National side: England
- Test debut: 30 December 1961 v India
- Last Test: 21 June 1962 v Pakistan

Domestic team information
- Years: Team
- 1954–1956: Bedfordshire
- 1957–1965: Nottinghamshire
- 1966–1968: Bedfordshire

Career statistics
Competition	Test	FC	LA
Matches	6	282	7
Runs scored	60	7,771	150
Batting average	12.00	18.86	30.00
100s/50s	0/0	3/25	0/1
Top score	32*	131*	54*
Balls bowled	–	39	–
Wickets	–	0	–
Bowling average	–	–	–
5 wickets in innings	–	–	–
10 wickets in match	–	–	–
Best bowling	–	–	–
Catches/stumpings	13/2	558/97	6/2
- Source: CricInfo, 14 August 2019

Geoffrey Millman (2 October 1934 – 6 April 2005) was an English cricketer who played in six Tests for England from 1961 to 1962.

== Life and career ==
Millman was born in Bedford, Bedfordshire, England and educated at Bedford Modern School. He was a good wicket-keeper, who came out of Minor Counties cricket with Bedfordshire, to become Nottinghamshire's regular keeper in 1957, and stayed for nine seasons. In a weak team that finished out of the bottom three of the County Championship only once in those nine years, Millman kept wicket to what was, almost invariably, the weakest county bowling attack of the period, and still managed to set county records. His 85 dismissals in 1961 was at the time the highest in a single season for Nottinghamshire.

Millman was also a useful right-handed batsman, scoring 1,000 runs in two seasons. In a county side where there were frequent personnel changes, he batted in most positions, often opening the innings. From 1963 to 1965 he was county captain, and in his first year, with the side buoyed by the newly acquired Brian Bolus, Nottinghamshire finished ninth. Two years later, though, they were back at the bottom and Millman resigned the captaincy and left first-class cricket, returning to Bedfordshire and his business interests.

Millman's Test match career was brief. In 1961–62, Marylebone Cricket Club (MCC) sent a somewhat unbalanced side, strong in batting but rather weak in bowling, on a four-month tour of India, Pakistan and Sri Lanka, then called Ceylon. Millman was picked as second wicketkeeper to John Murray, but Murray did not do well in the first three Tests against India. Millman, praised by Wisden for his "quiet efficiency", stepped in for the final two Indian Tests and, when Murray flew home for an operation on varicose veins after the first Test in Pakistan, returned for the last two matches in the series there as well.

He made enough of an impression to be picked for the first two home Tests against Pakistan in the 1962 season, before giving way to Murray for the rest of the series. Murray and Alan Smith were then picked for the 1962–63 Marylebone Cricket Club (MCC) tour of Australia and New Zealand, and Millman's chance never came again.

In retirement, he ran the family jewellery business in Bedford. He died in his hometown in April 2005, aged 70.

Sporting positions
Preceded by Andrew Corran	Nottinghamshire County cricket captain 1963–1965	Succeeded by Norman Hill
