= Murray Hofmeyr =

South African sportsman

Personal information
- Full name: Murray Bernard Hofmeyr
- Born: 9 December 1925; Pretoria, Transvaal, South Africa
- Died: 17 May 2018 (aged 92); Knysna, South Africa
- Batting: Right-handed
- Bowling: Right-arm medium
- Role: Opening batsman

Domestic team information
- Years: Team
- 1949–1951: Oxford University
- 1951/52–1953/54: North Eastern Transvaal

Career statistics
| Competition | First-class |
|---|---|
| Matches | 44 |
| Runs scored | 3,178 |
| Batting average | 44.76 |
| 100s/50s | 7/19 |
| Top score | 161 |
| Balls bowled | 23 |
| Wickets | 1 |
| Bowling average | 11.00 |
| 5 wickets in innings | 0 |
| 10 wickets in match | 0 |
| Best bowling | 1/0 |
| Catches/stumpings | 29/– |
- Source: CricketArchive, 16 November 2022

Murray Bernard Hofmeyr (9 December 1925 – 17 May 2018) was a South African sportsman who played international rugby union for England and first-class cricket in both England and South Africa.

After growing up in South Africa and attending Pretoria Boys High School, Hofmeyr moved to England in 1948 as a Rhodes Scholar at Worcester College, Oxford. He represented Oxford University in both cricket and rugby union. From 1949 to 1951, Hofmeyr, an opening batsman, made 35 first-class appearances for the university and scored 2495 runs.

In the 1949 Varsity Match, Hofmeyr ‘played a dogged and courageous innings and carried his bat’—the first player from Oxford University to have done so in an intervarsity for sixty-eight years. He scored an unbeaten 64 (out of 169) and 54 in the unexpected defeat. He had his most prolific year in 1950 when he scored 1063 runs at 55.94 and brought up four centuries. His highest score, 161, came against Gloucestershire, in an innings where the next highest score was his opening partner Brian Boobbyer's 28. Boobbyer would also partner Hofmeyr in the England rugby union team.

Playing as a full-back, Hofmeyr appeared in three of England's four Tests in the 1950 Five Nations Championship, against Wales, France and Scotland. He played his club rugby for Harlequins and also represented the Barbarians.

He captained the Oxford University Cricket Club in the 1951 season and then returned to South Africa. In the 1951/52 and 1952/53 Currie Cup competition, Hofmeyr was captain of North Eastern Transvaal and played a total of nine first-class matches, from which he made 683 runs at 48.78.
