= Arthur Carr (cricketer) =

English cricketer (1893–1963)

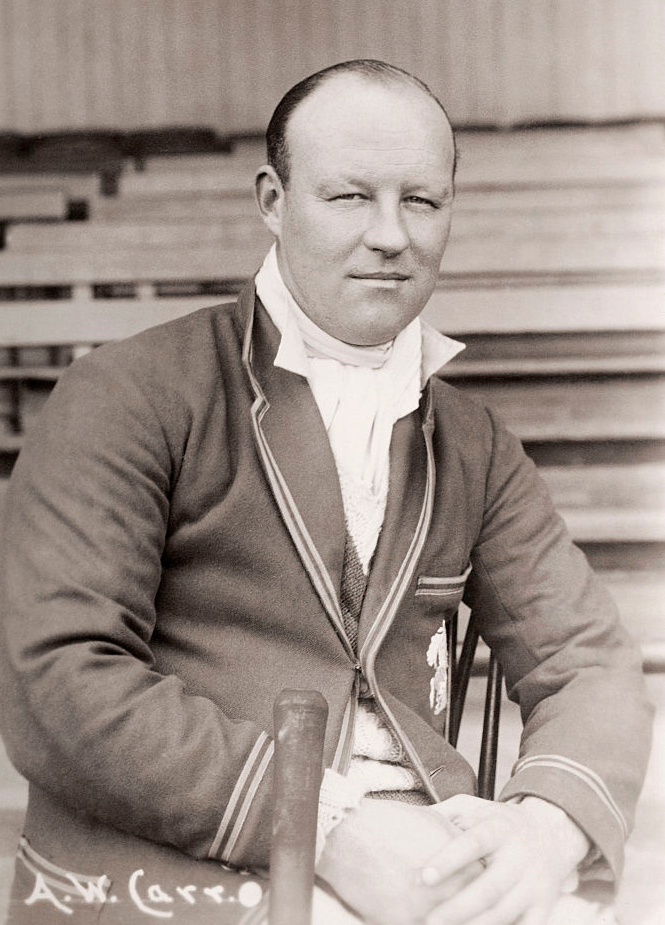

Personal information
- Full name: Arthur William Carr
- Born: 21 May 1893; Mickleham, Surrey, England
- Died: 7 February 1963 (aged 69); West Witton, Yorkshire, England
- Batting: Right-handed
- Bowling: Right arm medium

International information
- National side: England
- Test debut: 23 December 1922 v South Africa
- Last Test: 17 August 1929 v South Africa

Career statistics
Competition	Test	First-class
Matches	11	468
Runs scored	237	21,051
Batting average	19.75	31.56
100s/50s	0/1	45/98
Top score	63	206
Balls bowled	–	1,816
Wickets	–	31
Bowling average	–	37.09
5 wickets in innings	–	0
10 wickets in match	–	0
Best bowling	–	3/14
Catches/stumpings	3/0	395/1
- Source: Cricinfo, 5 August 2020

Arthur William Carr (21 May 1893 – 7 February 1963) was an English cricketer. He played for the Nottinghamshire County Cricket Club and the English cricket team, captaining both sides.

== Cricket career ==
A promising young batsman, Carr was given his first game of first-class cricket for Nottinghamshire in 1910, while still at school. He played well and was rewarded with the captaincy of Nottinghamshire in 1919.

Carr was selected for England's tour of South Africa in 1922–23, and made his debut in the first Test against the South African cricket team. He was named a Wisden Cricketer of the Year for 1923.

For the Ashes series against Australia in 1926, Carr was named captain of England. In the third Test at Leeds, he controversially put Australia into bat after winning the toss, and compounded it by dropping Charlie Macartney at slip in the first over of the match. Macartney scored a hundred before lunch and England were lucky to avoid defeat. He came down with tonsillitis during the fourth Test of the series, and although he recovered in time for the fifth Test, was replaced as captain by Percy Chapman. He was bitterly disappointed with this decision, and although he captained England twice more in his final two Tests against South Africa in 1929, from then on he put most of his effort into captaining Nottinghamshire into a dominant position within the English County cricket competition.

In 1930 and the following years, Carr was instrumental in developing the Bodyline bowling tactic together with future England captain Douglas Jardine and the two Nottinghamshire fast bowlers Harold Larwood and Bill Voce. Carr used this tactic of instructing his bowlers to aim at the bodies of batsmen and placing a close set field on the leg side to take catches fended away from the body with the bat and perfected it as he led Nottinghamshire to success in the county competition. Jardine then used Larwood and Voce in similar fashion on the 1932–33 English tour of Australia, the tactic resulting in injuries to Australian batsmen and raising the ire of the Australian public.

After this tour and the subsequent fallout, Carr was subjected to Bodyline bowling by other English county teams, and was severely shaken by several balls that nearly hit him on the head. He denounced the tactic he had helped develop as unfair. Dissension within the Nottinghamshire club over his role in Bodyline led him being sacked as captain in 1934, and he never played first-class cricket again.

Carr played 11 Test matches, scoring 237 runs at an average of 19.75. His first-class career spanned 468 matches, and in this he made 21,051 runs at an average of 31.56 including 45 hundreds. He also bowled medium pace occasionally at first-class level, taking 31 wickets at an average of 37.09.

Sporting positions
Preceded by Arthur Gilligan	English national cricket captain 1926	Succeeded by Rony Stanyforth
Preceded by Arthur Jones	Nottinghamshire County cricket captain 1919–1934	Succeeded by George Heane
