= Reg Simpson =

English cricketer

Personal information
- Full name: Reginald Thomas Simpson
- Born: 27 February 1920; Sherwood, Nottingham, England
- Died: 22 November 2013 (aged 93)
- Batting: Right-handed
- Bowling: Right-arm off break

International information
- National side: England
- Test debut (cap 341): 16 December 1948 v South Africa
- Last Test: 25 March 1955 v New Zealand

Career statistics
Competition	Test	First-class
Matches	27	495
Runs scored	1,401	30,546
Batting average	33.35	38.32
100s/50s	4/6	64/159
Top score	156*	259
Balls bowled	45	4,664
Wickets	2	59
Bowling average	11.00	37.74
5 wickets in innings	0	0
10 wickets in match	0	0
Best bowling	2/4	3/22
Catches/stumpings	5/–	192/–
- Source: CricInfo, 5 August 2020

Reginald Thomas Simpson (27 February 1920 – 22 November 2013) was an English cricketer, who played in 27 Test matches from 1948 to 1955.

== Life and career ==
Born in Sherwood, Nottingham, England, Simpson attended Nottingham High School. At the age of 13, having participated in an opening partnership of 467 with Henry Betts in a house game, Simpson was selected for the High School first team. He first gave notice of his abilities at a higher level scoring 134 not out for Nottinghamshire County Cricket Club against the RAF at Trent Bridge in 1940. During the war he served as a pilot with the RAF but also took the opportunity to play cricket for the RAF alongside the likes of Wally Hammond and Bill Edrich, for the Europeans in India alongside Joe Hardstaff junior and Denis Compton and occasional games for Notts.

Following the war Simpson made an immediate impression on the game, and was picked for the 1948–49 tour of South Africa on which he played his first Test, without success. He returned to the England side in the middle order against New Zealand in 1949, and scored a century, but with Len Hutton and Cyril Washbrook embedded as England's first choice openers, he could not secure a regular place in the side.

Simpson was named one of the Five Cricketers of the Year by Wisden in 1950. He toured Australia for the 1950–51 Ashes series and made 349 runs (38.77), second only to Hutton in the England averages. He made 156 not out on his 31st birthday in the fifth and final Test. This innings was the finest of his career, first adding 131 with Hutton and making 64 out of a stand of 74 for the last wicket, to put England 103 runs ahead, and gave them their first victory against Australia since 1938. It was the highest score of his Test career, and he also made his highest first-class hundred of 259 against the Sheffield Shield champions, New South Wales. He returned for the 1954–55 Ashes series under Hutton, but played in only one Test.

He was a fearless and effective player of fast bowling, but had a habit of getting out to spin bowlers, whom he regarded with contempt. He assumed the captaincy of a frail Nottinghamshire side in 1951, and held the position for a decade despite nagging injuries. His county remained largely unsuccessful despite his efforts as skipper, and amassing over 30,000 runs in his career. Simpson scored 64 centuries in all. He topped the national batting averages in 1962, with 867 runs at 54.18, and retired after the 1963 season.

After retiring from playing cricket, Simpson served on the Nottinghamshire committee and was a director of Gunn and Moore. In the 1970s Simpson moved to Scunthorpe where he became the president of Nuform Sports Cricket Club and occasionally played for them in charity and friendly matches, he remained president until the club folded in 1994. On the death of Alec Bedser on 4 April 2010, Simpson became the oldest surviving England Test cricketer.

Sporting positions
Preceded by William Sime	Nottinghamshire County cricket captain 1951–1960	Succeeded by John Clay
